= List of artworks in the Eskenazi Health Art Collection =

This is a list of artworks in the Eskenazi Health Art Collection, most of which are located in the Sidney and Lois Eskenazi Hospital. The collection began in the early part of the 20th century and was greatly expended when the new hospital was opened in 2013. A number of the artworks have been nationally recognized for excellence, and the collection is considered part of a healing environment.

Title	Image	Artist	Year	Location	Coordinates	Material	Dimensions	Owner
Mural Fragment (Whitewater at Brookville)		Adams, John Ottis	1914	Fifth Third Bank Building, Lower Level: Heritage Hallway		Oil on Canvas, Adhered on Masonite	40" x 34" Framed	Eskenazi Health
Ana Marie Broudeur		Adams, Wayman	1914	Fifth Third Bank Building, 5th Floor: Foundation Suite: Legal		Oil on Canvas, Adhered on Masonite	23" x 26.5" Framed	Eskenazi Health
Mary Vissa		Adams, Wayman	1914	Fifth Third Bank Building, 5th Floor: Foundation Suite: Legal		Oil on Canvas, Adhered on Masonite	23" x 26.5" Framed	Eskenazi Health
Oval Portrait of a Child		Adams, Wayman	1914	Fifth Third Bank Building, 5th Floor: Foundation Suite: Legal		Oil on Canvas, Adhered on Masonite	14" x 17" Framed	Eskenazi Health
Oval Portrait of a Child		Adams, Wayman	1914	Fifth Third Bank Building, 5th Floor: Foundation Suite: Legal		Oil on Canvas, Adhered on Masonite	14" x 17" Framed	Eskenazi Health
Portrait of Child (Girl with a Blue Bow)		Adams, Wayman	1914	Fifth Third Bank Building, 5th Floor: Foundation Suite: Legal		Oil on Canvas, Adhered on Masonite	23" x 27" Framed	Eskenazi Health
Richard William Etter		Adams, Wayman	1914	Fifth Third Bank Building, 5th Floor: Foundation Suite: Legal		Oil on Canvas, Adhered on Masonite	23" x 27" Framed	Eskenazi Health
Tener Reko		Adams, Wayman	1914	Fifth Third Bank Building, 5th Floor: Foundation Suite: Legal		Oil on Canvas, Adhered on Masonite	23" x 27" Framed	Eskenazi Health
Mural Fragment (Idealized Landscape)		Andersen, Martinus	1914	Fifth Third Bank Building, Lower Level: Heritage Hallway		Oil on Canvas, Adhered on Masonite	45" x 54" Framed	Eskenazi Health
Mural Fragment (Idealized Landscape)		Brown, Francis F.	1914	Fifth Third Bank Building, Lower Level: Heritage Hallway		Oil on Canvas, Adhered on Masonite	149" x 57" Framed	Eskenazi Health
Mural Fragment (Landscape)		Connaway, Jay H.	1914	Fifth Third Bank Building, 5th Floor: John and Norma Thompson Social Hub		Oil on Canvas, Adhered on Masonite	64" x 43" Framed	Eskenazi Health
Mural Fragment (Landscape)		Connaway, Jay H.	1914	Fifth Third Bank Building, 3rd Floor: Conference Room Lobby		Oil on Canvas, Adhered on Masonite	65" x 42" Framed	Eskenazi Health
Mural Fragment (Two Children)		Scott, William Edouard	1914	Fifth Third Bank Building, Lower Level: Heritage Hallway		Oil on Canvas, Adhered on Masonite	41.5" x 40" Framed	Eskenazi Health
Mural Fragment (Idealized Landscape)		Graf, Carl C.	1914	Fifth Third Bank Building, Lower Level: Heritage Hallway		Oil on Canvas, Adhered on Masonite	50" x 60" Framed	Eskenazi Health
Landscape		Graf, Carl C.	1914	Fifth Third Bank Building, Lower Level: Heritage Hallway		Oil on Canvas, Adhered on Masonite	125" x 60" Framed	Eskenazi Health
Mural Fragment (The Three Muses)		Graf, Carl C.	1914	Fifth Third Bank Building, 2nd Floor: Department of Medicine Administration Entrance		Oil on Canvas, Adhered on Masonite	64" x 57" Framed	Eskenazi Health
Dedication Plaque		Hibben, Helene	1914	Fifth Third Bank Building, Lower Level: Heritage Hallway		Bas-Relief Bronze	8' x 3' Unframed	Eskenazi Health
Mural Fragment (Pilgrim Dwelling)		Scott, William Edouard	1914	Fifth Third Bank Building, Lower Level: Heritage Hallway		Oil on Canvas, Adhered on Masonite	78" x 73" Framed	Eskenazi Health
Mural Fragment (Simeon and the Babe Jesus)		Scott, William Edouard	1914	Sidney & Lois Eskenazi Hospital, 1st Floor: Faegre Baker Daniels Conference Room: The Rapp Family Conference Center		Oil on Canvas, Adhered on Masonite	50" x 106" Framed	Eskenazi Health
Mural Fragment (Autumn Landscape)		Steele, T.C.	1914	Fifth Third Bank Building, 5th Floor: Foundation Suite		Oil on Canvas, Adhered on Masonite	44" x 79" Framed	Eskenazi Health
Mural Fragment (Autumn Landscape)		Steele, T.C.	1914	Fifth Third Bank Building, 5th Floor: Foundation Suite		Oil on Canvas, Adhered on Masonite	42" x 76" Framed	Eskenazi Health
Mural Fragment (Four Seasons: Autumn)		Steele, T.C.	1914	Sidney & Lois Eskenazi Hospital, 1st Floor: The Rapp Family Conference Center: Steel Corridor		Oil on Canvas, Adhered on Masonite	117" x 79" Framed	Eskenazi Health
Mural Fragment (Four Seasons: Spring)		Steele, T.C.	1914	Sidney & Lois Eskenazi Hospital, 1st Floor: The Rapp Family Conference Center: Steel Corridor		Oil on Canvas, Adhered on Masonite	122" x 73" Framed	Eskenazi Health
Mural Fragment (Four Seasons: Summer)		Steele, T.C.	1914	Sidney & Lois Eskenazi Hospital, 1st Floor: The Rapp Family Conference Center: Steel Corridor		Oil on Canvas, Adhered on Masonite	117" x 68" Framed	Eskenazi Health
Mural Fragment (Four Seasons: Winter)		Steele, T.C.	1914	Sidney & Lois Eskenazi Hospital, 1st Floor: The Rapp Family Conference Center: Steel Corridor		Oil on Canvas, Adhered on Masonite	114" x 76" Framed	Eskenazi Health
October		Steele, T.C.	1918	Fifth Third Bank Building, 5th Floor: Foundation Suite		Oil on Canvas	24.5" x 29" Framed	Eskenazi Health
Mural Fragment (Spring Landscape with Path)		Steele, T.C.	1914	Sidney & Lois Eskenazi Hospital, 1st Floor: Faegre Baker Daniels Conference Room Entrance: The Rapp Family Conference Center		Oil on Canvas, Adhered on Masonite	40" x 70" Framed	Eskenazi Health
Mural Fragment (Spring Trees)		Steele, T.C.	1914	Sidney & Lois Eskenazi Hospital, 1st Floor: Faegre Baker Daniels Conference Room Entrance: The Rapp Family Conference Center		Oil on Canvas, Adhered on Masonite	40" x 75" Framed	Eskenazi Health
Mural Fragment (Idealized Landscape)		Wheeler, Clifton	1914	Fifth Third Bank Building, Lower Level: Heritage Hallway		Oil on Canvas, Adhered on Masonite	45" x 77" Framed	Eskenazi Health
Mural Fragment (Idealized Landscape)		Wheeler, Clifton	1914	Fifth Third Bank Building, Lower Level: Heritage Hallway		Oil on Canvas, Adhered on Masonite	115" x 77" Framed	Eskenazi Health
Mural Fragment (Women and Children)		Wheeler, Clifton	1914	Sidney & Lois Eskenazi Hospital, 1st Floor: Faegre Baker Daniels Conference Room: The Rapp Family Conference Center		Oil on Canvas, Adhered on Masonite	70" x 39" Framed	Eskenazi Health
Morning on the White River		Mason Archie	2013	Sidney & Lois Eskenazi Hospital, 6th Floor: Robert & Gina Laikin Intensive Care Unit Waiting Room		Oil on Linen	A 61.5" x 38.25" Framed B 61.5" x 38.25" Framed	Eskenazi Health
Blues		Loretta Pettway Bennett	2007	Sidney & Lois Eskenazi Hospital, 2nd Floor: Yellow Elevator Bay		Softground Spitbite Aquatint Etching	37.75" 48.25" Framed	Eskenazi Health
Forever (For Old Lady Sally)		Loretta Pettway Bennett	2006	Sidney & Lois Eskenazi Hospital, 2nd Floor: Yellow Elevator Bay		Softground Spitbite Aquatint Etching	50.75" x 35.75" Framed	Eskenazi Health
Sew Low		Loretta Pettway Bennett	2011-2012	Sidney & Lois Eskenazi Hospital, 1st Floor: Yellow Elevator Bay		Quilted Fabric	83" x 87" Framed	Eskenazi Health
Vegetation		Loretta Pettway Bennett	2009	Sidney & Lois Eskenazi Hospital, 2nd Floor: Yellow Elevator Bay		Quilted Fabric	83" x 98.5" Framed	Eskenazi Health
Calm Waters		Kathy Bradford	2013	Sidney & Lois Eskenazi Hospital, 4th Floor: Richard M. Fairbanks Burn Center		Sand Carved, Etched, and Glue-Chipped Glass; Painted Wall	238" x 77" Unframed	Eskenazi Health
Fig Houses		India Cruse-Griffin	2010	Sidney & Lois Eskenazi Hospital, 3rd Floor: Robert & Gina Laikin Registration & Waiting Room		Mixed Media on Wood	37.25" x 13" Framed	Eskenazi Health
Friends		India Cruse-Griffin	2011	Sidney & Lois Eskenazi Hospital, 3rd Floor: Robert & Gina Laikin Registration & Waiting Room		Mixed Media on Wood	11.25" x 21.25" Framed	Eskenazi Health
Hope Skip and Jump		India Cruse-Griffin	2012	Sidney & Lois Eskenazi Hospital, 3rd Floor: Robert & Gina Laikin Registration & Waiting Room		Mixed Media on Wood	41.25" x 28.25" Framed	Eskenazi Health
Melody at Hand		India Cruse-Griffin	2007	Sidney & Lois Eskenazi Hospital, 3rd Floor: Robert & Gina Laikin Registration & Waiting Room		Mixed Media on Wood	49.25" x 37.25" Framed	Eskenazi Health
Sunday Morning		India Cruse-Griffin	2013	Sidney & Lois Eskenazi Hospital, 3rd Floor: Robert & Gina Laikin Registration & Waiting Room		Mixed Media on Wood	28.25" x 41.25" Framed	Eskenazi Health
Two Moons		India Cruse-Griffin	2010	Sidney & Lois Eskenazi Hospital, 3rd Floor: Robert & Gina Laikin Registration & Waiting Room		Mixed Media on Wood	25" x 24" Framed	Eskenazi Health
Wading in the Water		India Cruse-Griffin	2007	Sidney & Lois Eskenazi Hospital, 3rd Floor: Robert & Gina Laikin Registration & Waiting Room		Mixed Media on Wood	49.25" x 37.25" Framed	Eskenazi Health
Arbor		Adam Frank	2013	Sidney & Lois Eskenazi Hospital: Green Elevator Bay (Floors 1 through 3 and 6 through 10)		Glass, Printed Acrylic, LED Backlight	Varies	Eskenazi Health
The Commonground		Land Collective	2013	Sidney & Lois Eskenazi Hospital Courtyard		Water Feature, Fountain, Trellis, Dining Structure	Varies	Eskenazi Health
The Sky Farm		Land Collective	2013	Eskenazi Health Outpatient Care Center, Rooftop Gardens		Varies	Eskenazi Health	
May/September		Rob Ley	2014	Sidney & Lois Eskenazi Hospital Campus Parking Garage, South End		Steel, Aluminum, Paint	60’ x 245’ x 4’	Eskenazi Health
Crossroads I and II		Ismeal Muhammud Nieves	2013	Eskenazi Health Outpatient Care Center, 4th Floor: Special Medicine and Infusion Center Waiting Room		Acrylic on Canvas	158” x 49.5”	Eskenazi Health
Temporal Synapse		Project One	2013	Sidney & Lois Eskenazi Hospital: Blue Elevator Bays (Floors 1–6)		Acrylic, Aluminum, Interactive Lighting	Varies	Eskenazi Health
the arrival		Casey Roberts	2013	Sidney & Lois Eskenazi Hospital, 5th Floor: The Sablosky Family Waiting Room		Cyanotype Painting with Gouache, Etched Glass Wall	Varies	Eskenazi Health
It was just last year...		Richard Ross	2013	Eskenazi Health Outpatient Care Center, 2nd Floor: RCR Technology Corporation Waiting Room		Photomurals	303” x 72” Unframed	Eskenazi Health
Balance		Tim Ryan	2013	Eskenazi Health Outpatient Care Center, 6th Floor: Multispecialist Waiting Room		Ceramic Installation	15’ x 4’ x 3.5” Framed	Eskenazi Health
Paths Crossed		Aaron Stephan	2013	Eskenazi Health Outpatient Care Center, Eli Lilly and Company Foundation Concourse		Maple Wood	16’ x 16’ x 64’	Eskenazi Health
Synchronicity of Color		Margo Sawyer	2013	Eskenazi Health Outpatient Care Center, Eli Lilly and Company Foundation Concourse: West Corridor		Powdercoat, Yellow Zinc Plate, Kameleon Paint on Steel	Varies	Eskenazi Health
Untitled #77		Artur Silva	2012	Eskenazi Health Outpatient Care Center, 5th Floor: Women's Specialties Waiting Room		Inkjet on Archival Paper	83.5” x 47.5”	Eskenazi Health
Untitled #78		Artur Silva	2012	Eskenazi Health Outpatient Care Center, 5th Floor: Women's Specialties Waiting Room		Inkjet on Archival Paper	83.5” x 47.5”	Eskenazi Health
Cloud Busting		Malcolm Mobutu Smith	2013	Eskenazi Health Outpatient Care Center, 3rd Floor: Surgical Specialties Waiting Room		Ceramics and Paint	22’ x 10’ Unframed, Each	Eskenazi Health
Argentina		Leela Cyd	2014	Fifth Third Bank Building, 2nd Floor: Fifth Third Foundation Lobby		Photographic Print	42" x 33" Framed	Eskenazi Health
California		Leela Cyd	2014	Fifth Third Bank Building, 1st Floor: Occupational Health Services Waiting Room		Photographic Print	42" x 33" Framed	Eskenazi Health
Hudson-Valley		Leela Cyd	2014	Fifth Third Bank Building, 1st Floor: Occupational Health Services Waiting Room		Photographic Print	42" x 33" Framed	Eskenazi Health
India		Leela Cyd	2014	Fifth Third Bank Building, 2nd Floor: Fifth Third Foundation Lobby		Photographic Print	42" x 33" Framed	Eskenazi Health
Mexico		Leela Cyd	2014	Fifth Third Bank Building, 1st Floor: Occupational Health Services: Entrance		Photographic Print	42" x 33" Framed	Eskenazi Health
Morocco		Leela Cyd	2014	Fifth Third Bank Building, 2nd Floor: Fifth Third Foundation Lobby		Photographic Print	42" x 33" Framed	Eskenazi Health
Provence		Leela Cyd	2014	Fifth Third Bank Building, 1st Floor: Occupational Health Services Waiting Room		Photographic Print	42" x 33" Framed	Eskenazi Health
Turkey		Leela Cyd	2014	Fifth Third Bank Building, 2nd Floor: Fifth Third Foundation Lobby		Photographic Print	42" x 33" Framed	Eskenazi Health
Tuscany		Leela Cyd	2014	Fifth Third Bank Building, 1st Floor: Occupational Health Services: Entrance		Photographic Print	42" x 33" Framed	Eskenazi Health
Vietnam		Leela Cyd	2014	Fifth Third Bank Building, 2nd Floor: Fifth Third Foundation Lobby		Photographic Print	42" x 33" Framed	Eskenazi Health
Sidney and Lois Eskenazi		Tuck Langland	2013	Sidney & Lois Eskenazi Hospital Building, 1st Floor: North End of Eli Lilly and Company Foundation Concourse		Bronze	19.5"h x 26"w x 36"d	Eskenazi Health
Earth Landscape		Jerry Points	2012	Fifth Third Bank Building, 2nd Floor: Parking Garage Corridor		Oil on Canvas	41" x 31" Framed	Eskenazi Health
Flemish Women		Kyle Ragsdale	2014	Fifth Third Bank Building, 2nd Floor: Parking Garage Corridor		Oil on Canvas	18" x 14" Unframed	Eskenazi Health
Double Dancer		Lyman Whitaker	2007	Eskenazi Health Campus Slip Garden		Wind Sculpture - Copper, Steel	7'8" x 2'1"	Eskenazi Health
Double Helix Sail		Lyman Whitaker	2007	Eskenazi Health Campus Slip Garden		Wind Sculpture - Copper, Steel	7'8" x 2'5"	Eskenazi Health
Twister Oval		Lyman Whitaker	2005	Eskenazi Health Campus Slip Garden		Wind Sculpture - Copper, Steel	11'3" x 2'7"	Eskenazi Health
Twister Star		Lyman Whitaker	2008	Eskenazi Health Campus Slip Garden		Wind Sculpture - Copper, Steel	11'3" x 2'7"	Eskenazi Health
