= Emma King =

Emma King may refer to:

- Emma King (cricketer) (born 1992), Australian cricketer
- Emma King (footballer) (born 1994), Australian rules footballer
- Emma B. King (1857–1933), American impressionist painter
