= Two Moons (disambiguation) =

Two Moons (1847–1917) was a Cheyenne chief.

Two Moons may also refer to:

- Two Moons (collage), a 2010 public artwork by India Cruse-Griffin, in Indianapolis, Indiana, US
- Two Moons (film), a 1920 American silent Western film
- "Two Moons", a 2012 song by Exo-K and Exo-M from Mama
- Two Moons, a 2000 piano composition by Ivan Fedele
- Two Moons, a 2000 novel by Thomas Mallon
- The Two Moons, a 2006 omnibus edition of the first two Giants novels by James P. Hogan

== See also ==
- Walk Two Moons, a 1994 novel by Sharon Creech
- Moons of Mars, Phobos and Deimos, the two moons of the planet Mars
