= Dunlap Building (Indiana University) =

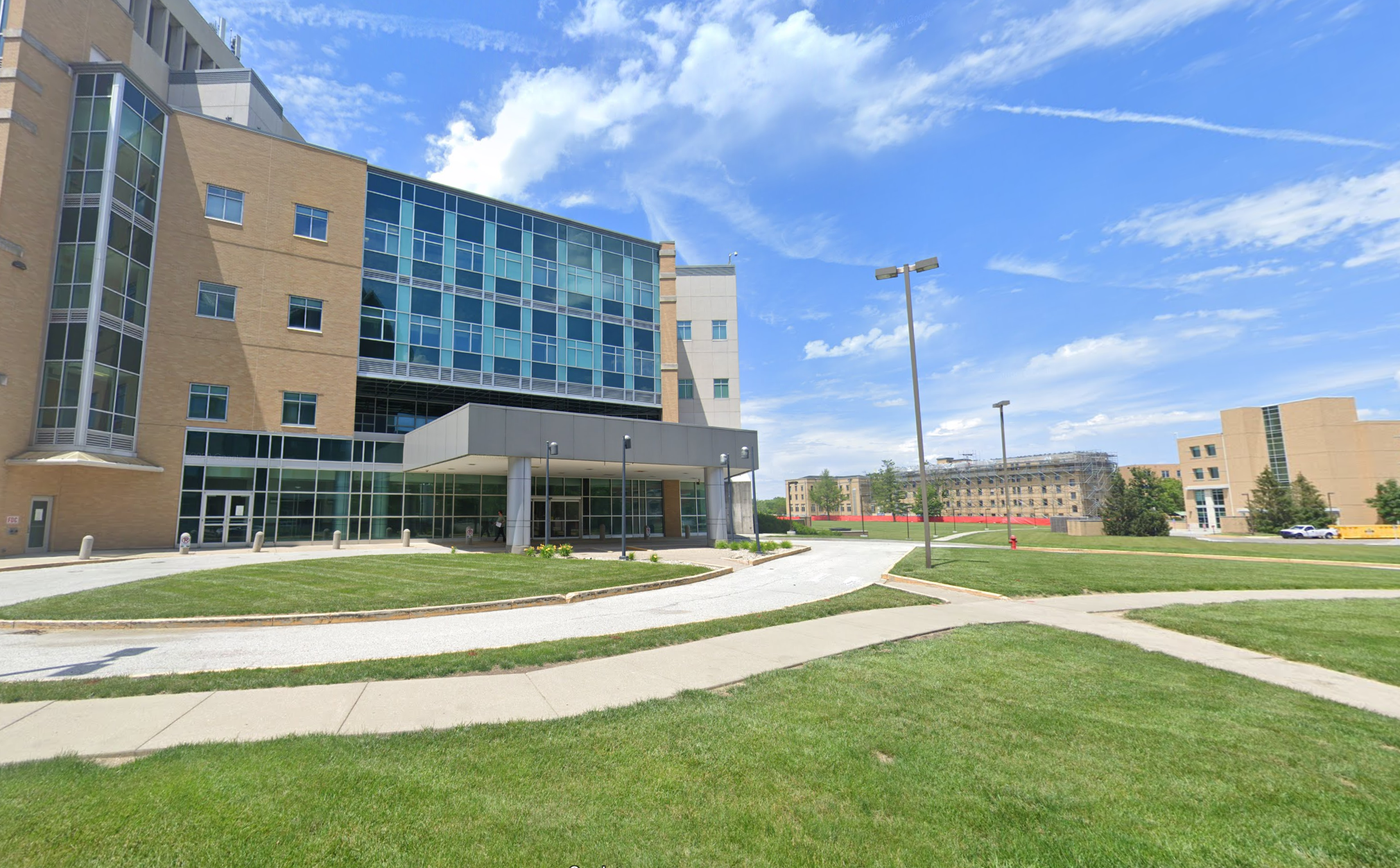
- Dunlap Building Entrance, 2019.

General information
- Location: 1040 Wishard Boulevard, Indianapolis, IN 46202-2859
- Coordinates: 39°46′42.549″N 86°10′38.650″W
- Completed: 1978
- Affiliation: Indiana University-Purdue University Indianapolis

Design and construction
- Architecture firm: McGuire and Shook Corporation

The Dunlap Building is located on the north side of Indiana University Indianapolis campus and is attached to the Health Sciences Building. The building is one of the former Wishard properties transferred to Indiana University in 2009 following a land swap to build the new Sidney & Lois Eskenazi Hospital.The Dunlap Building forms part of the IU Medical Center and houses part of the Health Sciences departments for Indiana University.

== History ==
The Dunlap building was constructed in 1978 and was designed by the McGuire and Shook Corporation. The total cost of the project was $9 million. The 71,038-square-foot three-story building housed the new Wishard Memorial Hospital radiology department, medical record services, and a new emergency room. The new emergency room was located on the ground floor and added four new rooms for heart attack victims and severely injured patients. The building possessed seventeen new private examination rooms and four larger family rooms. The new X-ray department space consisted of 11 X-ray rooms, two ultrasound rooms, and one computed tomography room.

The opening of the Dunlap Building led to the moving of many departments to the new office spaces in the four-story building. The emergency medical services moved to the main floor and the radiology services moved to first floor immediately after its opening in 1978. The medical records services department moved to the building shortly after its opening and revamped the entire department.

Indiana University and the Health and Hospital Corporation of Marion County reached a land swap agreement on June 12, 2009, where IUPUI would acquire several Wishard Health Services buildings including the Dunlap Building, Ott Building, Bryce Building, Health Sciences Building, and Lockfield Village. The buildings were turned over to Indiana University in 2014 following the move from Wishard to Eskenazi Health. The university chose to renovate the Dunlap Building for future education uses rather than demolish it. American Structurepoint served as the lead architect for the master planning of the Wishard renovation project.

In 2020, the Dunlap building was renovated with a new brick façade with punched openings for the northeast side of the building. Vertical glazing was added to introduce natural light into the interior of the building. In 2022, the first and second floors were renovated by arcDesign to allow the Family Medicine Center to move from their location at Senate and 15th Avenue to the main IUPUI campus. The renovations included a comprehensive upgrade of all mechanical, electrical, plumbing, and fire protection systems, provided by HEAPY. The exterior of the Dunlap Building received a new brick facade with punched openings and vertical glazing on the northeast side of the facility. In 2023, the main floor lobby of the Dunlap Building was renovated to include a larger informal learning space to create additional study spaces for students.

== Namesake ==
The Dunlap Building was named after Dr. Livingston Dunlap, the third physician to settle in Indianapolis. Dunlap was responsible for the creation of the Indianapolis City Hospital, which he began campaigning for in the 1830s. He was also responsible for the creation of the Indiana State Medical Association, Central State Hospital, the Indiana School for the Deaf, and the Indiana School for the Blind.

== See also ==
- Indiana University–Purdue University Indianapolis Public Art Collection
