= Crossroads (mural) =

- Artist: Ismeal Muhammud Nieves
- Year: 2013
- Dimensions: 126 cm × 400 cm (49.5 in × 158 in); Each
- Location: Eskenazi Health; Indianapolis, Indiana, United States; 39°46′41″N 86°11′03″W
- Owner: Eskenazi Health

Crossroads is a 2013 mural that consists of two acrylic on canvas paintings (Crossroads I and Crossroads II) by the artist Ismael Muhammud Nieves. It is located within the Eskenazi Outpatient Care Center on the Sidney and Lois Eskenazi Hospital campus, near downtown Indianapolis, Indiana, USA, and is part of the Eskenazi Health Art Collection.

== Description ==
Each framed work measures 158 x 49.5 inches. Inspired by sitting on a porch or gazing out a window, letting the mind wander across the landscape, Nieves created a bright composition of Indiana native flowers and plants by incorporating emblematic images from the Eskenazi Health Art Collection together with Native American and Indiana state symbols incorporated with graffiti shapes, as Ismael Muhammad Nieves comments below:

Indiana’s landscape is beautiful year-round. The landscape has been enjoyed through contemporary eyes as well as the Native Americans who call this land home. Throughout the mural are woodland scenes directly inspired from the Eskenazi Health Art Collection. The animals, trees, and foliage in the murals are native to Indiana. Incorporating graffiti shapes and palette, in my opinion, creates a fun atmosphere for the waiting area. There are parts of my painting that were inspired by Eskenazi Health’s existing art collection. I challenge the viewers to identify them.

== Historical information ==
=== Acquisition ===
Crossroads was commissioned by Eskenazi Health as part of a re-imagining of the organization's historical art collection and to support "the sense of optimism, vitality and energy" of its new campus in 2013. In response to its nationwide request for proposals, Eskenazi Health received more than 500 submissions from 39 states, which were then narrowed to 54 finalists by an independent jury. Each of the 54 proposals was assigned an area of the new hospital by Eskenazi Health's art committee and publicly displayed in the existing Wishard Hospital and online for public comment; more than 3,000 public comments on the final proposals were collected and analyzed in the final selection. Crossroads is credited as "Dedicated with gratitude, The Ruthelen and Andrew Burns Family".

=== Location ===
Crossroads is located in the Special Medicine and Infusion Center waiting room on the 4th level of the Eskenazi Outpatient Care Center on the Sidney and Lois Eskenazi Hospital campus.

== Artist ==
Ismeal Muhammud Nieves spent his early years in New York City before moving to Indiana as a teen. After serving in the U.S. military, he attended Purdue University, where he received a B.S. in electrical engineering. A self-taught artist, Nieves' work has been exhibited at South Shore Arts, the Indianapolis Museum of Contemporary Art, the Indiana University Northwest Gallery for Contemporary Art, Sheldon Swope Art Museum in Terre Haute, 2612 Space and Supreme Gallery in Chicago and Crewest Gallery in Los Angeles, among others. Nieves has completed several public mural commissions and has been involved closely with Subsurface, a graffiti event in Indianapolis. He is based in Hammond, Indiana.
