= Four Seasons (murals) =

Series of murals by T.C. Steele

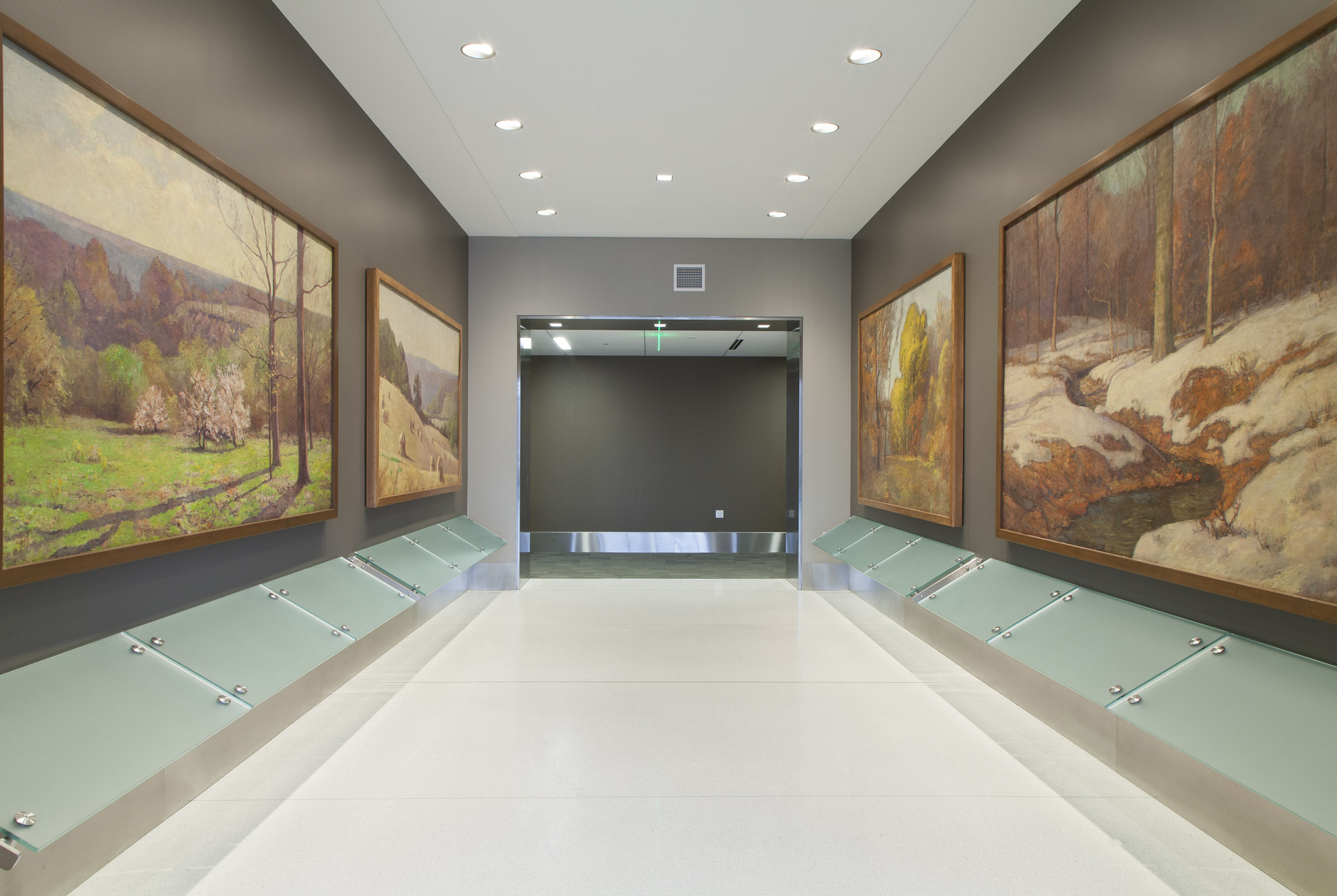
- Artist: T.C. Steele
- Year: 1914
- Dimensions: (Varies in × Varies in)
- Location: Eskenazi Health; Indianapolis, Indiana, United States; 39°46′41″N 86°11′03″W
- Owner: Eskenazi Health

Four Seasons is a series of four murals - Spring, Summer, Autumn, and Winter - painted in 1914 by Indiana artist T.C. Steele, which feature the landscape of Brown County, Indiana. The paintings are located on the Eskenazi Health campus, near downtown Indianapolis, Indiana, and are part of the Eskenazi Health Art Collection.

== Description ==
Four Seasons is a series of four oil on canvas murals - Spring, Summer, Autumn, and Winter - painted in 1914 by Indiana artist T.C. Steele, which feature the landscape of Brown County, Indiana. Often regarded as the "pioneer of Indiana landscape paintings," Steele, in his signature "agreeable impressionistic style," used color, light, and brushwork to capture the experience of each season in southern Indiana. In 1917, Alfred M. Brooks, in his article "The Art and Work of Theodore Steele," featured in The American Magazine of Art, wrote that the Four Seasons murals feature "...lovely echoes of light and shade, made to play over, and to accentuate, rather than conceal, the highly representative character of the details which make up the purely pictorial nature of the subjects, these 'Seasons' are masterly and, decoratively masterful. They bespeak the inherent bigness and breadth of the scenes they represent so faithfully."

Title	Medium	Dimensions
Four Seasons: Autumn	Oil on canvas, adhered on masonite	79" x 117" Framed
Four Seasons: Spring	Oil on canvas, adhered on masonite	73" x 122" Framed
Four Seasons: Summer	Oil on canvas, adhered on masonite	68" x 117" Framed
Four Seasons: Winter	Oil on canvas, adhered on masonite	76" x 114" Framed

== Historical information ==
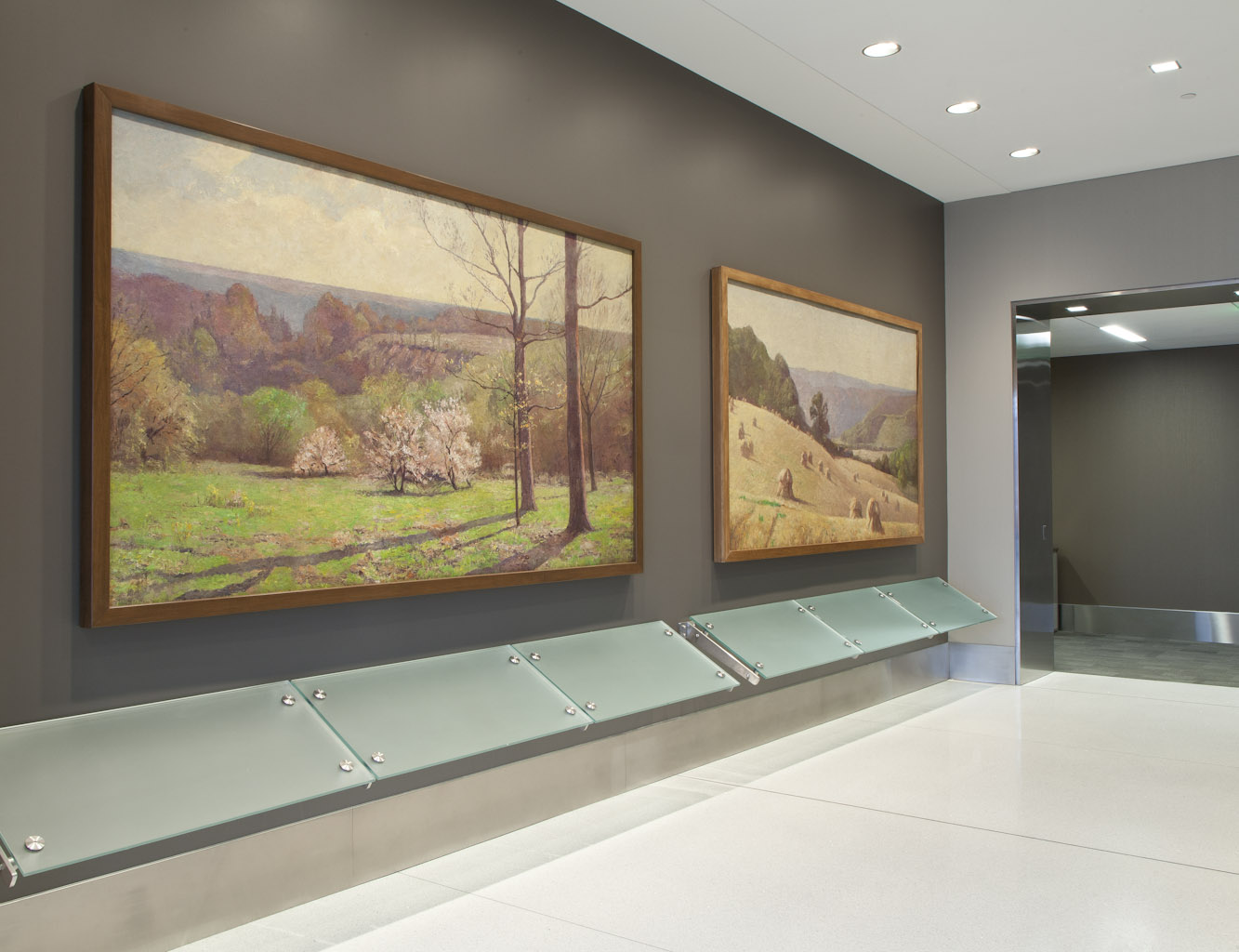
Spring and Summer of T.C. Steele's The Four Seasons at Eskenazi Hospital

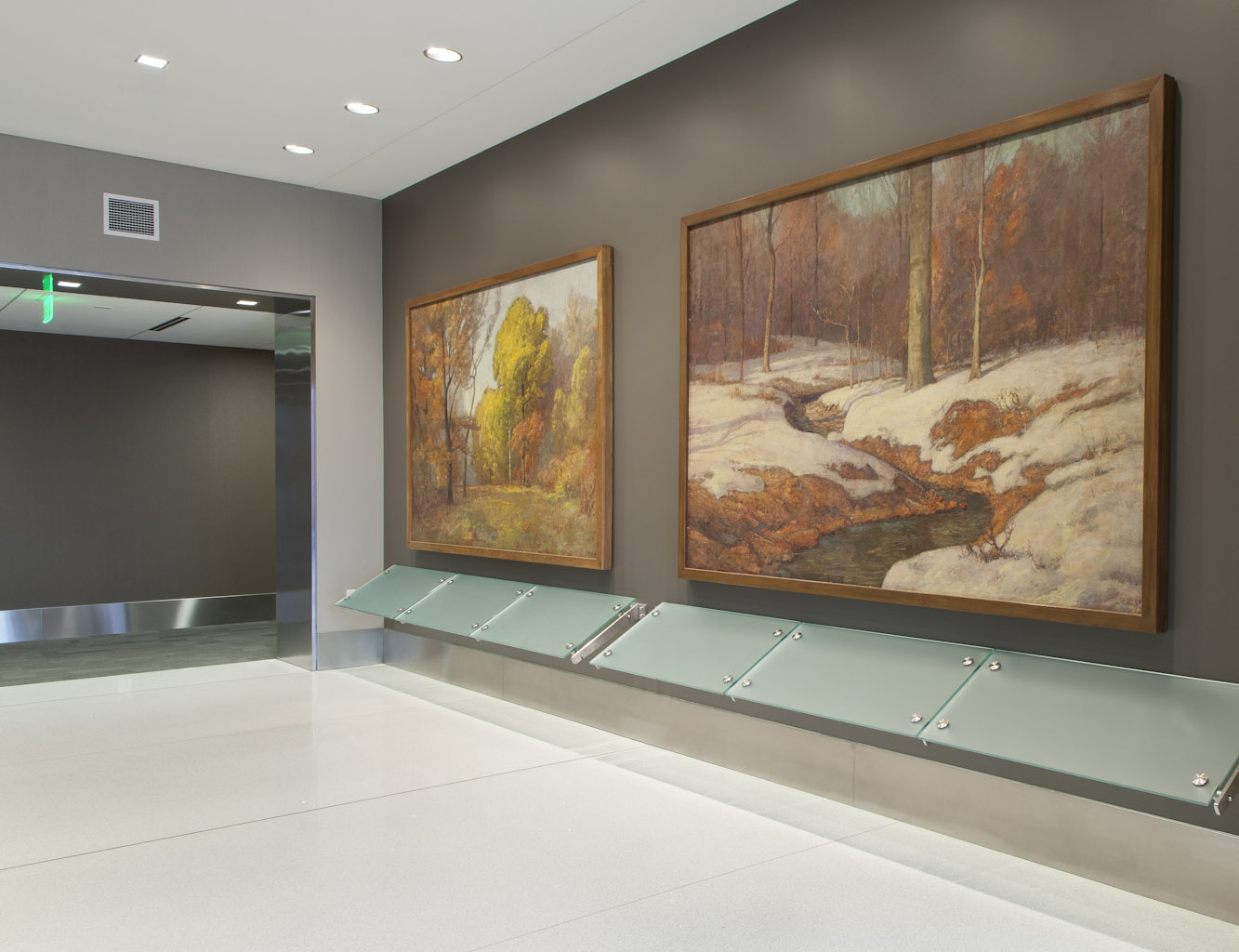
Fall and Winter T.C. Steele's The Four Seasons at Eskenazi Hospital

The Four Seasons murals were created as part of the 1914 City Hospital Mural Project in Indianapolis, Indiana. In 1911, Indianapolis City Hospital expanded by adding two dedicated patient buildings, the Burdsal Units. St. Margaret's Hospital Guild, a local women's volunteer group dedicated to supporting the City Hospital, donated money for decoration of the new wards, which resulted in the world's first large-scale mural project in a public hospital. Sixteen of Indiana's "finest and most promising" artists, including Steele, were invited to contribute to the mural project. Despite the limited budget, Steele and the other artists committed to completing the project for the wages of a union house painter, approximately $75–100 per month.

While the majority of artists worked on-site at the hospital, Steele painted the Four Seasons murals at his home, "The House of the Singing Winds," in Brown County, Indiana. Because the canvases and frameworks were so large, and his existing studio could not accommodate the space required, Steele painted the murals in his living room. In late 1914, before they were installed in the hospital, the Four Seasons murals were exhibited at the Herron Art Institute. Upon arrival at City Hospital, the four canvases were mounted to patient ward walls using a mixture of white lead and damar varnish. Once hung, the adhesive was further secured by covering the completed murals with thick layers of varnish.

=== Conservation ===
In 1967, imminent renovation plans for the Burdsal units endangered the mural collection. Through a campaign organized by St. Margaret's Hospital Guild, Steele's murals were slated for conservation by the James G. Snodgrass Studio. The four murals were removed from the building's walls, mounted to masonite, restored, and displayed at the Indiana State Museum. With building renovations complete, in 1976, three of Steele's murals - Spring, Summer, and Autumn - were returned to the hospital, where they hung in conference rooms. The fourth mural, Winter, was gifted to the museum as a gesture of gratitude for the works' safekeeping.

=== Location ===
The Four Seasons mural fragments were reunited with the 2013 opening of a new Sidney and Lois Eskenazi Hospital campus and are part of the Eskenazi Health Art Collection. Winter is on loan for 99 years from the Indiana State Museum. The Four Seasons mural fragments are located in The Rapp Family Conference Center: Steele Corridor on the first floor of the Sidney & Lois Eskenazi Hospital and are "Dedicated with gratitude, The Penrod Society.”

== Artist ==
Theodore Clement Steele (1847–1926) was an Impressionist painter known for his portraits and Indiana landscape paintings. Born and raised in Indiana, he studied at the Royal Academy when he and his family moved to Munich in 1879. Steele returned to Indiana in 1885 and was part of a group of well-known Indiana artists, the Hoosier Group. Among others, Steele's work is included at the Haan Mansion Museum of Indiana Art, Indiana State Museum, Indianapolis Museum of Art, the Los Angeles County Museum of Art, and the Indiana University Art Museum in Bloomington, Indiana.

== See also ==
- Eskenazi Health Art Collection
- Sidney & Lois Eskenazi Hospital
