= Temporal Synapse =

- Artist: Project One
- Year: 2013
- Dimensions: 380 cm (Varies in × 149 in)
- Location: Eskenazi Health; Indianapolis, Indiana, United States; 39°46′41″N 86°11′03″W
- Owner: Eskenazi Health

Temporal Synapse is a 2013 six-part permanent, reactive art installation created by Project One located inside Sidney and Lois Eskenazi Hospital, near downtown Indianapolis, Indiana, and is part of the Eskenazi Health Art Collection.

== Description ==
Temporal Synapse is a 2013 six-part permanent, reactive art installation by Project One, the collaboration between artists and architects Kyle Perry and Adam Buente. Inspired by the physicality of synapses in the brain, which permit signals between cells, allowing data and information to surge through the body, the artists set out to mimic this communication process outside the body, between users and their environment.

Located in the elevator bays on the first six levels of Sidney & Lois Eskenazi Hospital, these Temporal Synapse feature walls consist of cast acrylic panels that feature a graphic pattern based upon cellular structures found within the body. Through the use of a fisheye camera, video tracking technology tracks visitors’ positions in space, which, in turn, directs reciprocal “cells” to light up, visually representing the interaction between those waiting and their environment. While each of the panels measure 149" in width, they range in height from 95"-107", depending on ceiling height.

== Historical information ==
=== Acquisition ===
Temporal Synapse was commissioned by Eskenazi Health as part of a re-imagining of the organization's historical art collection and to support "the sense of optimism, vitality and energy" of its new campus in 2013. In response to its nationwide request for proposals, Eskenazi Health received more than 500 submissions from 39 states, which were then narrowed to 54 finalists by an independent jury. Each of the 54 proposals was assigned an area of the new hospital by Eskenazi Health's art committee and publicly displayed in the existing Wishard Hospital and online for public comment; more than 3,000 public comments on the final proposals were collected and analyzed in the final selection.

=== Location ===
Temporal Synapse is located in the Blue Elevator Bays on levels 1-6 of Sidney & Lois Eskenazi Hospital.

== Artist ==
Founded in 2009, Project One is a collaboration between Muncie, Indiana-based artists and architects Adam Buente and Kyle Perry, both of whom earned B.S. and M.Arch degrees from Ball State University. In 2009, the partners received an Innovation Award from the national Robert Bruce Thompson Annual Student Light Fixture Design Competition for their prototype “Morpholuminescence.”

== See also ==
- Eskenazi Health Art Collection
- Sidney & Lois Eskenazi Hospital
