= Calm Waters =

2013 glass and paint installation by Katherine Bradford

- Artist: Katherine Bradford
- Year: 2013
- Dimensions: 200 cm × 600 cm (77 in × 238 in)
- Location: Eskenazi Health; Indianapolis, Indiana, United States; 39°46′41″N 86°11′03″W
- Owner: Eskenazi Health

Calm Waters is a 2013 large glass and paint installation by artist Katherine Bradford. It is located on the Eskenazi Health campus, near downtown Indianapolis, Indiana, US, and is part of the Eskenazi Health Art Collection.

== Description ==
Calm Waters is a 2013 mixed-media installation by artist Kathy Bradford, which consists of seven panels of 3/8-inch (9.5 mm) thick glass that sit several inches in front of a painted abstract pattern resembling waves in blue, gray and teal. The glass panels consist of sand-carved clear laminated glass and clear, white and gray etched glass. A technique known as glue-chipping, which creates a sparkle effect, is also used on the panels. The layered arrangement of glass and paint, which measures 77 in × 238 in (2,000 mm × 6,000 mm) overall, creates the illusion of both notable depth and change or movement as pedestrians walk past. Of the work's subject and purpose, the artist has said, "This imagery is of a large body of calm water with cloud reflections throughout the composition. This imagery is intended to transport the thoughts of the viewer, creating relaxation and calmness. Combining the art glass with the painted wall behind the glass surface creates multiple colors shifting throughout the composition. It is intended to intrigue the viewer and encourage further investigation."

== Historical information ==
=== Acquisition ===
Calm Waters was commissioned by Eskenazi Health as part of a re-imagining of the organization's historical art collection and to support "the sense of optimism, vitality and energy" of its new campus in 2013. In response to its nationwide request for proposals, Eskenazi Health received more than 500 submissions from 39 states, which were then narrowed to 54 finalists by an independent jury. Each of the 54 proposals was assigned an area of the new hospital by Eskenazi Health's art committee and publicly displayed in the existing Wishard Hospital and online for public comment. More than 3,000 public comments on the final proposals were collected and analyzed in the final selection. Calm Waters is credited as "Dedicated with gratitude, Prof. N.L. Georgakopoulos".

=== Location ===
Calm Waters is installed in the Richard M. Fairbanks Burn Center on the 4th level of Sidney & Lois Eskenazi Hospital.

== Artist ==
Bradford attended the University of Missouri at Kansas City where she earned a BA in art education. Her studies in glass continued at Colorado Mountain College and at the Stained Glass School with the artist Paul Marioni. Her work has been profiled in Art Glass Quarterly and Glass Art magazine, and she has lectured at glass art conferences internationally. Her commissions include public art for the University of Nebraska at Omaha and glass art for the Abramson Center for Jewish Life in Philadelphia, the Russian Tea Room in New York and the Good Samaritan Hospital in Downers Grove, Illinois. She received the National Decade of Excellence Award for glass fusing and slumping. She lives in Lyons, Colorado.
