= Morning on the White River =

2013 painting by Mason Archie

- Artist: Mason Archie
- Year: 2013
- Dimensions: 97.2 cm × 156 cm (38.25 in × 61.5 in)
- Location: Eskenazi Health; Indianapolis, Indiana, United States; 39°46′41″N 86°11′03″W
- Owner: Eskenazi Health

Morning on the White River is a 2013 painted landscape diptych by Mason Archie of the White River in Indianapolis, Indiana. The paintings are located on the Eskenazi Health campus, near downtown Indianapolis, Indiana, and are part of the Eskenazi Health Art Collection.

== Description ==
Morning on the White River is a 2013 oil on linen canvas landscape diptych by artist Mason Archie, which depicts a view of the White River from a location approximately ¼ mile from Sidney & Lois Eskenazi Hospital. Archie selected this specific location along the river to paint when he encountered human traces left behind there. Makeshift fishing props and a worn path serve as evidence of the frequency with which local residents visit, and these details can be seen within the paintings: Each of the two paintings measure 38.25" x 61.5", framed.

== Historical information ==
=== Acquisition ===
Morning on the White River was commissioned by Eskenazi Health as part of a re-imagining of the organization's historical art collection and to support "the sense of optimism, vitality and energy" of its new campus in 2013. In response to its nationwide request for proposals, Eskenazi Health received more than 500 submissions from 39 states, which were then narrowed to 54 finalists by an independent jury. Each of the 54 proposals was assigned an area of the new hospital by Eskenazi Health's art committee and publicly displayed in the existing Wishard Hospital and online for public comment; more than 3,000 public comments on the final proposals were collected and analyzed in the final selection. Morning on the White River is credited as "Dedicated with gratitude by Kathi and Bob Postlethwait.”

=== Location ===
Morning on the White River is located in the 6th Floor Robert & Gina Laikin Intensive Care Waiting Room of the Sidney & Lois Eskenazi Hospital.

== Artist ==
A self-taught artist born and raised in Dayton, Ohio, Mason Archie began his career as a commercial sign painter with Lamar Outdoor Advertising. In 2005, he decided to pursue fine art painting in the style of traditional realism full-time, and has exhibited and sold his paintings nationally ever since. Archie is a member of the Oil Painters of America, the Hoosier Salon Patrons Association, the Portrait Society of America, the International Guild of Realism and the African American Visual Artist Guild. He received the Creative Renewal Arts Fellowship from the Arts Council of Indianapolis and Lilly Endowment in 2007.

== See also ==
- Eskenazi Health Art Collection
- Sidney & Lois Eskenazi Hospital
