= Vegetation (quilt) =

- Artist: Loretta Pettway Bennett
- Year: 2009
- Dimensions: 250 cm × 210 cm (98.5 in × 83 in)
- Location: Eskenazi Health; Indianapolis, Indiana, United States; 39°46′41″N 86°11′03″W
- Owner: Eskenazi Health

Vegetation is a 2009 quilt by Gee's Bend quilter Loretta Pettway Bennett. It is located on the Eskenazi Health campus, near downtown Indianapolis, Indiana, and is part of the Eskenazi Health Art Collection.

== Description ==
Vegetation is a 2009 quilt by Gee's Bend quilter Loretta Pettway Bennett designed in the style of the quilts of Gee's Bend, which uses recycled household and thrift store clothing. This quilt consists of strips and squares of fabric in shades of blue, green, brown, and cream that, together, create a framed large rectangle measuring 98.5" x 83". Bennett originally created Vegetation for her own personal bed.

== Historical information ==
=== Acquisition ===
Vegetation was acquired by Eskenazi Health as part of a re-imagining of the organization's historical art collection and to support "the sense of optimism, vitality and energy" of its new campus in 2013. In response to its nationwide request for proposals, Eskenazi Health received more than 500 submissions from 39 states, which were then narrowed to 54 finalists by an independent jury. Each of the 54 proposals was assigned an area of the new hospital by Eskenazi Health's art committee and publicly displayed in the existing Wishard Hospital and online for public comment; more than 3,000 public comments on the final proposals were collected and analyzed in the final selection. Sew Low is credited "in honor of Grandmother Mae; Lisa E. Harris, M.D."

=== Location ===
Vegetation is currently displayed in the yellow elevator corridor on the 2nd floor of Sidney & Lois Eskenazi Hospital.

== Artist ==
Loretta Pettway Bennett is a fifth-generation quilter from Gee's Bend, Alabama; she is the great-great-granddaughter of Dinah Miller, a former slave and the ancestor of one of the prominent quilt-making families in the area. Bennett has exhibited her work in several museums, including the Houston Museum of Fine Arts, the Indianapolis Museum of Art, the Orlando Museum of Art, the Tacoma Art Museum, the Denver Art Museum and the Philadelphia Museum of Art. Additionally, her work has appeared in numerous galleries, including the Greg Kucera Gallery in Seattle and the Paulson Press Gallery in Berkeley, California. Selected by the Foundation for Art and Preservation in Embassies (FAPE), Bennett's work also hangs on the walls of United States embassies worldwide.

== See also ==
- Eskenazi Health Art Collection
- Sidney & Lois Eskenazi Hospital
- The Quilts of Gee's Bend
