= Synchronicity of Color =

- Artist: Margo Sawyer
- Year: 2013
- Dimensions: 270 cm (108 in × Varies in)
- Location: Eskenazi Health; Indianapolis, Indiana, United States; 39°46′41″N 86°11′03″W
- Owner: Eskenazi Health

Synchronicity of Color is a 2013 installation by Margo Sawyer, which consists of eight inset forms and 23 wall-mounted forms decorated with automobile paints, located within the Eskenazi Health Outpatient Care Center on the Sidney and Lois Eskenazi Hospital campus, near downtown Indianapolis, Indiana, and is part of the Eskenazi Health Art Collection.

== Description ==
Synchronicity of Color, an installation by artist Margo Sawyer, consists of a total of 31 square and rectangular forms, which vary in size and depth, producing a layered effect. Of the forms, 23 are wall-mounted and eight are inset within the corridor between the Sidney and Lois Eskenazi Hospital and visitor parking garage. These boxy forms are constructed of steel and are painted with various automobile paints in varying colors - including dynamic color paints, which give the impression of changing color when viewed from different angles - a nod to Indianapolis’ rich history in racing.

Synchronicity of Color takes its inspiration from Jung’s conception of synchronistic events, the idea that “meaningful coincidences” are created if subjects occur independently yet seem to be related in a meaningful way. While the individual forms exist separately from one another, their shared scale, rhythm, and repetition create a singular, cohesive experience. The inset of specific forms reinforces this connection, as well as expands the work into the architecture of the hospital corridor.

== Historical information ==
=== Acquisition ===
Synchronicity of Color was commissioned by Eskenazi Health as part of a re-imagining of the organization's historical art collection and to support "the sense of optimism, vitality and energy" of its new campus in 2013. In response to its nationwide request for proposals, Eskenazi Health received more than 500 submissions from 39 states, which were then narrowed to 54 finalists by an independent jury. Each of the 54 proposals was assigned an area of the new hospital by Eskenazi Health's art committee and publicly displayed in the existing Wishard Hospital and online for public comment; more than 3,000 public comments on the final proposals were collected and analyzed in the final selection.

=== Location ===
Synchronicity of Color is located in the West Corridor of the Eli Lilly and Company Foundation Concourse in the Eskenazi Health Outpatient Care Center on the Sidney & Lois Eskenazi Hospital campus in Indianapolis, Indiana.

== Artist ==
Margo Sawyer was born in Washington, D.C., and raised in England. Before receiving her BA honors degree from the Chelsea School of Art in London, she completed her foundation education in art from Brighton Polytechnic. She then attended the Skowhegan School of Painting and Sculpture before completing her MFA at Yale University. Sawyer's work has exhibited at the Austin Art Museum, the University of Texas at El Paso, the Mattress Factory in Pittsburgh, the Art Museum at the University of Houston, and at Holly Johnson Gallery in Dallas. She has received several honors, including an individual artist fellowship from the National Endowment for the Arts, the Rome Prize from the American Academy in Rome, Fulbright travel grants to India and Japan and a Louis Comfort Tiffany Foundation biennial award. Sawyer's public commissions include work for the San Antonio International Airport, Whole Foods World Headquarters in Austin, the Convention Center in Austin, One Arts Plaza in Dallas, Austin Ranch in Plano and Discovery Green in Houston, which received a Public Art Network Award for one of the 40 best projects in the U.S. in 2008. Since 1988, Sawyer has taught art at the University of Texas at Austin.

== See also ==
- Eskenazi Health Art Collection
- Sidney & Lois Eskenazi Hospital
