= May/September =

Art installation

- Artist: Rob Ley
- Year: 2014
- Dimensions: 18 m × 75 m × 1.2 m (60 ft × 245 ft × 4 ft)
- Location: Eskenazi Health; Indianapolis, Indiana, United States; 39°46′41″N 86°11′03″W
- Owner: Eskenazi Health

May/September is a 2014 site-specific, permanent art installation created by artist Rob Ley, which is located on the south exterior wall of the Parking Garage on the Sidney and Lois Eskenazi Hospital campus, near downtown Indianapolis, Indiana, and is part of the Eskenazi Health Art Collection.

== Description ==
May/September is a 2014 site-specific, permanent art installation created by artist Rob Ley located on the south exterior wall of the Parking Garage on the Sidney and Lois Eskenazi Hospital campus. The work, which measures 60' × 245' × 4', consists of approximately 6,500 anodized aluminum "leaves" or panels of differing angles generally arranged vertically on the vast plane of the parking garage in order to create an "interactive, synthetic terrain." Inspired by colors found in Hoosier artist T.C. Steele's Four Seasons, works that are part of a larger mural project created for the hospital more than a century ago, and the changing of Indiana's four recognizable seasons, the east sides of the installed aluminum panels feature a vibrant yellow color, while west-facing panel faces are dark indigo. This directional color program, in tandem with the differing angles and depths of protrusions, results in a dynamic façade that appears soft and undulating, ever-changing with the viewer's position and speed. May/September was manufactured in collaboration with Indianapolis Fabrications, also known as iFab, an Indianapolis-based creative project fabrication company.

== Historical information ==
=== Acquisition ===
May/September was commissioned by Eskenazi Health as part of a re-imagining of the organization's historical art collection and to support "the sense of optimism, vitality and energy" of its new campus in 2013. In response to its nationwide request for proposals, Eskenazi Health received more than 500 submissions from 39 states, which were then narrowed to 54 finalists by an independent jury. Each of the 54 proposals was assigned an area of the new hospital by Eskenazi Health's art committee and publicly displayed in the existing Wishard Hospital and online for public comment; more than 3,000 public comments on the final proposals were collected and analyzed in the final selection.

=== Location ===
May/September is located on the south exterior wall of the Parking Garage located on the Sidney & Lois Eskenazi Hospital campus in Indianapolis, Indiana.

=== Awards ===
May/September is a 2015 Public Art Network (PAN) Year in Review award recipient, the highest recognition for public art in the United States. Along with 30 other award recipients, May/September was chosen from more than 300 nationwide entries and was honored at the Americans for the Arts' 2015 Annual Convention in Chicago.

== Artist ==
Rob Ley attended University of Illinois at Urbana/Champaign, where he received his B.Arch, and earned his M.Arch. from the University of California, Los Angeles. Before founding Urbana Studio in 2002, he worked for public artist Cliff Garten, as a designer for Randall Stout Architects, and with Chicago's MAK Architecture. Ley teaches fabrication and digital technologies undergraduate and graduate studios and seminars at the University of Southern California. He lives in Los Angeles.

== See also ==
- Eskenazi Health Art Collection
- Sidney & Lois Eskenazi Hospital
