= It was just last year... =

2013 art installation by Richard Ross

- Artist: Richard Ross
- Year: 2013
- Dimensions: 180 cm × 770 cm (72 in × 303 in); Each
- Location: Eskenazi Health; Indianapolis, Indiana, United States; 39°46′41″N 86°11′03″W
- Owner: Eskenazi Health

It was just last year... is a 2013 installation by Richard Ross, which consists of three photomurals containing a total of 108 24" x 24" photographs, that is located within the Eskenazi Health Outpatient Care Center on the Sidney and Lois Eskenazi Hospital campus, near downtown Indianapolis, Indiana, and is part of the Eskenazi Health Art Collection.

== Description ==
It was just last year..., by artist Richard Ross, consists of three photomurals containing a total of 108 photographs of the people and environments in the neighborhoods served by Eskenazi Health as a “depiction of the community’s collective memory.” Inspired by T.C. Steele's murals of the four seasons, originally created as part of the City Hospital mural project in 1914, which featured both professional artists and students working together, Ross, along with his daughter, Leela Cyd Ross, gathered together teams of student photographers to take photographs within the neighborhoods surrounding the hospital. In the fall of 2012 and spring and summer of 2013, using a Diana camera, the student photographers, including elementary school, middle school, high school, college undergraduate, college graduate students, and hospital staff, produced photographs of the people, landscapes, and buildings of Indianapolis neighborhoods. The photographs were then developed, printed, scanned, and retouched before Richard Ross selected 108 images to be used in the final work. He curated three large photomurals – one for each season in which the photographs were taken. Each mural measures 72" x 303", unframed. Of the project, Ross explains:

“’Collective Memory’ serves as a great theme for the work. We wanted to create a series of 'tiles' that would reference the world that surrounds the hospital and make it a familiar and comfortable space. While people filled with the tension of awaiting hospital services sit waiting, they could explore and 'solve' the references of ambiguous yet alluring images. Our goal was for the artworks to transform the new space into a warm, welcoming, familiar environment for staff, patients, and visitors. To achieve this we collaborated with students from Marion County, ensuring the artwork truly belonged to the community it would reside in. We selected sites in the immediate environment that the community's population would recognize. The final selects represented animals from the zoo, objects from surrounding museums, dogs and children in the neighborhood, swimming pools, the state fair—a broad swatch of images that would reference the world just beyond the hospital.” -Richard Ross

== Historical information ==
=== Acquisition ===
It was just last year... was commissioned by Eskenazi Health as part of a re-imagining of the organization's historical art collection and to support "the sense of optimism, vitality and energy" of its new campus in 2013. In response to its nationwide request for proposals, Eskenazi Health received more than 500 submissions from 39 states, which were then narrowed to 54 finalists by an independent jury. Each of the 54 proposals was assigned an area of the new hospital by Eskenazi Health's art committee and publicly displayed in the existing Wishard Hospital and online for public comment; more than 3,000 public comments on the final proposals were collected and analyzed in the final selection. It was just last year... is credited, "Dedicated with gratitude, American Senior Communities."

=== Location ===
It was just last year... is located in the RCR Technology Corporation Waiting Room on the 2nd level of the Eskenazi Outpatient Care Center on the Sidney & Lois Eskenazi Hospital campus in Indianapolis, Indiana.

== Artist ==
Richard Ross received his BA from the University of Vermont and his MFA from the University of Florida at Gainesville. As a commercial photographer, his work has been featured in Time magazine, Newsweek, Architectural Digest, all major U.S. broadcast news networks and many in Europe, and several large newspapers, including The Washington Post and USA Today. Since 2000, Ross has served as principal photographer for the J. Paul Getty Museum. As a fine art photographer, Ross's work has been featured in solo shows at Aperture Gallery in New York, Acme Art, the J. Paul Getty Museum, the Santa Barbara Museum of Art and the University of Southampton in the United Kingdom, among others. He was the recipient of a Fulbright research grant for travel to Italy, two grants from the Annie E. Casey Foundation and two National Endowment for the Arts grants. Ross has taught photography at the University of California at Santa Barbara since 1978.

== See also ==
- Richard Ross (photographer)
- Eskenazi Health Art Collection
- Sidney & Lois Eskenazi Hospital
