= The Arrival (installation) =

- Artist: Casey Roberts
- Year: 2013
- Dimensions: (Varies in × Varies in)
- Location: Eskenazi Health, Indianapolis, Indiana, United States; 39°46′41″N 86°11′03″W
- Owner: Eskenazi Health

The Arrival is a 2013 installation, which consists of two paintings and a glass wall, by artist Casey Roberts and is located within the Sidney and Lois Eskenazi Hospital, near downtown Indianapolis, Indiana, and is part of the Eskenazi Health Art Collection.

== Description ==
The Arrival is a 2013 installation by Casey Roberts, which consists of a patterned glass wall and door and two paintings. The wall, which measured 78.25" x 262", framed, consists of two panels of glass that have been fused together, and then decorated with both semi-translucent and opaque decoration, including trees and new and budding plants, creating a frosted effect. The paintings, both which measure 69.5" square, framed, were created by painting paper with cyanotype chemicals before completing the work with additional painting and flower collage. Of the work's imagery, the artist comments:

"I worked to create a calm, peaceful environment and yet keep it interesting. I used closely related imagery for both the paintings and the glass wall to build a cohesive setting. The elements of budding flowers, young plants and the arrival of birds signal the onset of spring and birth/rebirth." -Casey Roberts

== Historical information ==
=== Acquisition ===
The Arrival was commissioned by Eskenazi Health as part of a re-imagining of the organization's historical art collection and to support "the sense of optimism, vitality and energy" of its new campus in 2013. In response to its nationwide request for proposals, Eskenazi Health received more than 500 submissions from 39 states, which were then narrowed to 54 finalists by an independent jury. Each of the 54 proposals was assigned an area of the new hospital by Eskenazi Health's art committee and publicly displayed in the existing Wishard Hospital and online for public comment; more than 3,000 public comments on the final proposals were collected and analyzed in the final selection. The Arrival is credited as "Dedicated with gratitude, Matthew R. Gutwein and Jane A. Henegar."

=== Location ===
The Arrival is located in the Sablosky Family Waiting Room on the 5th level of the Sidney & Lois Eskenazi Hospital in Indianapolis, Indiana.

== Artist ==
Casey Roberts was born and raised in Central Indiana. After serving in the U.S. military, he attended Herron School of Art and Design, IUPUI to study painting, printmaking, and sculpture. In the Indianapolis area, Roberts has exhibited at the Harrison Center for the Arts, Herron School of Art, and the Indianapolis Art Center. He has also exhibited work at Home Gallery and Trinity College in Chicago, The 930 Gallery in Louisville, and Walker Contemporary in Boston. Roberts's work has also been featured in group exhibitions at the Indianapolis Museum of Contemporary Art, Dean Johnson Gallery, and Bodner Gallery in Indianapolis, and at Gescheidle Gallery in Chicago. Roberts is the recipient of two local awards – a Creative Renewal Arts Fellowship and an Efroymson Contemporary Arts Fellowship.

== See also ==
- Eskenazi Health Art Collection
- Sidney & Lois Eskenazi Hospital
