= Balance (installation) =

- Artist: Tim Ryan
- Year: 2013
- Dimensions: 1.2 m × 4.6 m (4 ft × 15 ft); Each
- Location: Eskenazi Health; Indianapolis, Indiana, United States; 39°46′41″N 86°11′03″W
- Owner: Eskenazi Health

Balance is a 2013 glazed ceramic installation by Tim Ryan, which consists of two panels on adjacent walls, each of which features triangular tiles that surround a channel containing white-glazed "eggs," that is located within the Eskenazi Health Outpatient Care Center on the Sidney and Lois Eskenazi Hospital campus, near downtown Indianapolis, Indiana, and is part of the Eskenazi Health Art Collection.

== Description ==
Balance is a 2013 glazed ceramic wall installation designed by artist Tim Ryan. The work is composed of two large panels, each which measure 4' x 15', framed, and feature blue and green glazed, patterned, triangular tiles surrounding a path of red grout in which white egg-shaped forms are embedded. While all clay features were made using high-fire stoneware clay, three different techniques were used to create the forms. The blue and green triangular tiles are hand-rolled and slab-cut; a ceramic extruder was used to make the thin, raised dividers; and the white egg-shaped forms were thrown on a pottery wheel. Ryan conducted workshops with Eskenazi Midtown Community Mental Health Center, and participants helped to create the triangular tiles featured in the work. To install Balance, the tiles, grout, and eggs were attached directly to the wall before surrounding the panels with a frame. Of the installation, artist Tim Ryan explains:

“Balance is an abstract work of art, intended to be visually interesting enough to invite a deeper look, finding personal patterns and significance. I think that the egg shape absolutely expresses this intersection of perfectly geometric and organic as well as hard edged triangles and soft texture.”

== Historical information ==
=== Acquisition ===
Balance was commissioned by Eskenazi Health as part of a re-imagining of the organization's historical art collection and to support "the sense of optimism, vitality and energy" of its new campus in 2013. In response to its nationwide request for proposals, Eskenazi Health received more than 500 submissions from 39 states, which were then narrowed to 54 finalists by an independent jury. Each of the 54 proposals was assigned an area of the new hospital by Eskenazi Health's art committee and publicly displayed in the existing Wishard Hospital and online for public comment; more than 3,000 public comments on the final proposals were collected and analyzed in the final selection. Balance is credited "In honor of Eskenazi Health Midtown Community Mental Health Art Program."

=== Location ===
Balance is located in the Multispecialist Waiting Room on the 6th level of the Eskenazi Outpatient Care Center on the Sidney & Lois Eskenazi Hospital campus in Indianapolis, Indiana.

== Artist ==
A native of New Jersey, clay artist Tim Ryan received a BA in English from Seton Hall University and attended classes at New York's Lincoln Center Institute for Arts in Education. He is a ceramics instructor at the Indianapolis Art Center, VSA Arts of Indiana, and Indiana School for the Blind and Visually Impaired. Ryan has an additional focus on teaching audiences with special needs and has conducted clay workshops for Riley Hospital for Children, Camp Isanogle, Wabash Valley Day Treatment Program, Young Audiences of Indiana, Indianapolis Public Schools and Camp Awareness, among others. Ryan is a recipient of the Arts Council of Indianapolis’ Creative Renewal Fellowship and advises on arts and disabilities throughout the region.

== See also ==
- Eskenazi Health Art Collection
- Sidney & Lois Eskenazi Hospital
