= Walter Hixson Isnogle =

American painter

Walter Isnogle
- Born: Walter Hixson Isnogle; November 14, 1886; Urbana, Ohio, U.S.
- Died: July 20, 1950 (aged 63); Marion, Indiana, U.S.
- Known for: Painting

Walter Hixson Isnogle (November 14, 1886 – July 20, 1950) was an American impressionist artist. Isnogle was known for his participation in the Indianapolis City Hospital Project.

Isnogle was born in Ohio and lived most of his life in Indianapolis. In 1916, he married Ruth Collier (b. 1891). She died from shock in 1927 following a tornado in the city.

== Career ==
Walter Hixon Isnogle was a student of the John Herron Institute in Indianapolis, Indiana. “Though little information is published about Isnogle, his participation in the City Hospital project is well-documented.” Isnogle was one of several artists to participate in the project, and was also one of many Hoosier Group artists to have participated in the project led by William Forsyth.
