= Arbor (installation) =

Art installation by Adam Frank in Indianapolis, Indiana

- Artist: Adam Frank
- Year: 2013
- Dimensions: (Varies in × Varies in)
- Location: Eskenazi Health; Indianapolis, Indiana, United States; 39°46′41″N 86°11′03″W
- Owner: Eskenazi Health

Arbor is a 2013 permanent art installation created by Adam Frank, commissioned for the Sidney and Lois Eskenazi Hospital, near downtown Indianapolis, Indiana. It is part of the Eskenazi Health Art Collection.

== Description ==
Arbor is a 2013 permanent art installation created by artist Adam Frank inside Sidney and Lois Eskenazi Hospital. Utilizing new lighting technologies, this eight-part work displays visually accurate shadows of Indiana native trees via recessed floor-to-ceiling light boxes in the green elevator bays of the hospital on levels 1-3 and 6–10. Of the work's intention and purpose, Frank said, “Arbor provides the hospital with an iconic, quiet work that symbolizes health and life. This work brings familiar, organic, natural lighting effects into what is normally a cold and sterile environment. Arbor brings natural lighting effects into the modern built environment in an entirely new way. The project is specifically meant to enhance how hospital patients, families and staff feel about the space they occupy.”

The feature walls showcase new, patent-pending technology, in which detailed 3D models are vertically sliced, each segment then rendered onto translucent glass and arranged at differing depths. An LED backlight passes through the layers of glass and onto the back surface of etched glass, resulting in highly detailed images close to the viewer and blurred images as the image recedes, creating the effect of both shadows and three dimensions.

Each floor's tree is unique and acts as a floor identifier and way-finding symbol:

| Floor | Tree species | Dimensions (in.) |
|---|---|---|
| 1 | Tulip (Indiana state tree) | 122 x 107 |
| 2 | Apple | 125 x 94 |
| 3 | Willow | 123 x 94 |
| 6 | American elm | 124 x 94 |
| 7 | Beech | 124 x 94 |
| 8 | Ginkgo | 124 x 94 |
| 9 | Sycamore | 124 x 94 |
| 10 | Silver maple | 124 x 94 |

== Historical information ==
=== Acquisition ===
Arbor was commissioned by Eskenazi Health as part of a re-imagining of the organization's historical art collection and to support "the sense of optimism, vitality and energy" of its new campus in 2013. In response to its nationwide request for proposals, Eskenazi Health received more than 500 submissions from 39 states, which were then narrowed to 54 finalists by an independent jury. Each of the 54 proposals was assigned an area of the new hospital by Eskenazi Health's art committee and publicly displayed in the existing Wishard Hospital and online for public comment; more than 3,000 public comments on the final proposals were collected and analyzed in the final selection.

=== Location ===
Arbor is located in the Green Elevator Bays on levels 1-3 and 6-10 of Sidney & Lois Eskenazi Hospital.

=== Awards ===
Arbor was recognized by Americans for the Arts 2014 Public Art Network Year in Review and was presented at The Public Art & Placemaking Conference in Nashville.

== Artist ==
Adam Frank studied at both the Rhode Island School of Design and at Brown University. As an artist, inventor, and product designer, he has exhibited at SIGGRAPH and the American Museum of the Moving Image, among others, and has designed lighting goods that are sold through the Design Store at the Museum of Modern Art in New York. Frank's work has been profiled extensively in the media, including by NBC, CBS, HGTV, CNN, The New York Times, Metropolis, Dwell and the Architectural Record. He lives and works in Brooklyn, N.Y.

== See also ==
- Eskenazi Health Art Collection
- Sidney & Lois Eskenazi Hospital
