= Cloud Busting (installation) =

2013 art installation

- Artist: Malcolm Mobutu Smith
- Year: 2013
- Dimensions: 3.0 m × 6.7 m (10 ft × 22 ft); Each
- Location: Eskenazi Health; Indianapolis, Indiana, United States; 39°46′41″N 86°11′03″W
- Owner: Eskenazi Health

Cloud Busting is a 2013 ceramic installation by Malcolm Mobutu Smith, which consists of eight tiles made by hand and individually mounted to a wall painted with a swirling, playful pattern, located within the Eskenazi Health Outpatient Care Center on the Sidney and Lois Eskenazi Hospital campus, near downtown Indianapolis, Indiana, and is part of the Eskenazi Health Art Collection.

== Description ==
Cloud Busting, the ceramic mural artwork by Malcolm Mobutu Smith, is inspired by the common pastime of identifying shapes and forms among the clouds. In the same way imaginative scenes and stories are derived from undetermined clouds, Cloud Busting offers shapes and forms that seem to float along the wall, awaiting interpretation. This work transforms the waiting room into a colorful, lighthearted, and fun space where visitors can engage with the inspiring and intriguing work. Smith describes Cloud Busting:

“In this work I hope the viewer can engage in a continuous sense of mystery and imagination, aided by the grandness of scale, bold and complex surfaces, and the ‘liquid elevation’ of elements. These are gravity-defying ceramic forms floating in mid-air; the air implied or “made real” by the undulating painted motif on the background and the physicality of the hovering tile forms.” - Malcolm Mobutu Smith

Cloud Busting consists of eight tiles made by hand and individually mounted to a wall painted with a swirling, playful pattern. Together, the eight tiles are made from 500 lbs. of clay. Creating the tiles took a total of eight months, each requiring more than one week to dry before being fired. The works are individually mounted to the waiting room wall, which features a painted swirling and spinning pattern, much like blowing winds. This pattern, along with tile glaze color, rhythm, and scale, unite the individual tiles into a single composition.

== Historical information ==
=== Acquisition ===
Cloud Busting was commissioned by Eskenazi Health as part of a re-imagining of the organization's historical art collection and to support "the sense of optimism, vitality and energy" of its new campus in 2013. In response to its nationwide request for proposals, Eskenazi Health received more than 500 submissions from 39 states, which were then narrowed to 54 finalists by an independent jury. Each of the 54 proposals was assigned an area of the new hospital by Eskenazi Health's art committee and publicly displayed in the existing Wishard Hospital and online for public comment; more than 3,000 public comments on the final proposals were collected and analyzed in the final selection. Cloud Busting is credited as "Dedicated with gratitude, Deborah Daniels and Lyle Mannweiler."

=== Location ===
Cloud Busting is located in the Surgical Specialties Waiting Room on the third level of the Eskenazi Health Outpatient Care Center on the Sidney & Lois Eskenazi Hospital campus in Indianapolis, Indiana.

== Artist ==
Malcolm Mobutu Smith is an artist and associate professor of ceramic art at Indiana University in Bloomington, Indiana. He studied at the Kansas City Art Institute and earned his BFA in ceramics at The Penn State University in 1994. Smith received his MFA in ceramics from the New York State College of Ceramics at Alfred University. He is an active artist, mounting solo exhibitions at Leedy-Voulkos Art Center in Kansas City, at Pyro Gallery in Louisville, Kentucky and at the Indianapolis Museum of Contemporary Art.

== See also ==
- Eskenazi Health Art Collection
- Sidney & Lois Eskenazi Hospital
