= Paths Crossed =

2013 suspended sculpture

- Artist: Aaron Stephan
- Year: 2013
- Dimensions: 4.9 m × 4.9 m × 20 m (16 ft × 16 ft × 64 ft)
- Location: Eskenazi Health, Indianapolis, Indiana, United States; 39°46′41″N 86°11′03″W
- Owner: Eskenazi Health

Paths Crossed is a 2013 suspended sculpture by Aaron T. Stephan that consists of six 60-feet-long wooden ladders and is located within the Eskenazi Health Outpatient Care Center on the Sidney and Lois Eskenazi Hospital campus, near downtown Indianapolis, Indiana, and is part of the Eskenazi Health Art Collection.

== Description ==
Paths Crossed, a 2013 suspended sculpture by artist Aaron T. Stephan, consists of six handmade 60-feet-long wooden ladders that bend, weave, and intertwine with each other above the reception area in the main atrium. Symbolically, a single ladder embodies notions of work, progress, service, and support. En masse, the six ladders, each maintaining its own path, come together, respond to each other, and reach both skyward and down to concourse seating and walkways – a dynamic, flexible, and powerful indication of both the strength of community interactions and the unique individual paths found within. Visitors' and patients' interpretations have included DNA, flying, and even a rollercoaster.

Fabricated in Portland, Maine, the six ladders featured in Paths Crossed is constructed from more than 1.5 miles of sustainably forested hard Indiana maple lumber, which was milled into strips before being glued and clamped onto large wooden forms to create the ladders’ curved side rails. The shape and form of each ladder was determined during fabrication, with each line responding to the last. Each side rail was then cut to size, planed, sanded, and finished before being assembled with rungs to connect each side. A total of 33 ladder sections were transported from Portland to Indianapolis and reconstructed on site using bolts, which were then covered with wooden pegs. Overall, Paths Crossed measures 16' x 16' x 64'.

== Historical information ==
=== Acquisition ===
Paths Crossed was commissioned by Eskenazi Health as part of a re-imagining of the organization's historical art collection and to support "the sense of optimism, vitality and energy" of its new campus in 2013. In response to its nationwide request for proposals, Eskenazi Health received more than 500 submissions from 39 states, which were then narrowed to 54 finalists by an independent jury. Each of the 54 proposals was assigned an area of the new hospital by Eskenazi Health's art committee and publicly displayed in the existing Wishard Hospital and online for public comment; more than 3,000 public comments on the final proposals were collected and analyzed in the final selection. Paths Crossed is credited, "Dedicated with gratitude, Barnes & Thornburg LLP."

=== Location ===
Paths Crossed is located in the Eli Lilly and Company Foundation Concourse in the Eskenazi Outpatient Care Center on the Sidney & Lois Eskenazi Hospital campus in Indianapolis, Indiana.

== Artist ==
A native of western New York, Aaron T. Stephan received his BFA in sculpture from the State University of New York at Purchase and his MFA from the Maine College of Art in Portland. He has received residencies at the Kohler Art Center in Sheboygan, Wisconsin, Skowhegan School of Painting and Sculpture and Yaddo in Saratoga Springs, New York. Stephan has exhibited internationally, and his previous commissioned work includes sculpture for the University of Southern Maine, the U.S. Border Crossing Facility in Jackson, Me., Merrill Marine Gateway in Portland, Me., and a variety of school facilities throughout Maine. He lives and works in Portland, Maine.

== See also ==
- Eskenazi Health Art Collection
- Sidney & Lois Eskenazi Hospital
