= Fig Houses =

- Artist: India Cruse-Griffin
- Year: 2010
- Dimensions: 33 cm × 94.6 cm (13 in × 37.25 in)
- Location: Eskenazi Health; Indianapolis, Indiana, United States; 39°46′41″N 86°11′03″W
- Owner: Eskenazi Health

Fig Houses is a 2010 mixed media collage by artist India Cruse-Griffin located on the Eskenazi Health campus, near downtown Indianapolis, Indiana, and is part of the Eskenazi Health Art Collection.

== Description ==
Fig Houses is a 2010 mixed media collage by artist India Cruse-Griffin, which depicts a row of houses. The work, which measures 13" x 37.25", framed, is made from collaged paper gathered from magazines, upon which Cruse-Griffin then paints, often allowing the underlying magazine paper to show through. While her subjects are often clear and straightforward, this collage technique serves as a reminder of the accumulation of lived experience.

== Historical information ==
=== Acquisition ===
Fig Houses was acquired by Eskenazi Health as part of a re-imagining of the organization's historical art collection and to support "the sense of optimism, vitality and energy" of its new campus in 2013. In response to its nationwide request for proposals, Eskenazi Health received more than 500 submissions from 39 states, which were then narrowed to 54 finalists by an independent jury. Each of the 54 proposals was assigned an area of the new hospital by Eskenazi Health's art committee and publicly displayed in the existing Wishard Hospital and online for public comment; more than 3,000 public comments on the final proposals were collected and analyzed in the final selection. Fig Houses is credited "in honor of Greg Kelleher, Lisa E. Harris, M.D."

=== Location ===
Fig Houses is currently displayed in the Robert & Gina Laikin Surgery Registration & Waiting Room on the third floor of Sidney & Lois Eskenazi Hospital.

== Artist ==
Indiana-based artist India Cruse-Griffin received her BS in Art Education from Ball State University. She has exhibited extensively, including at the Richmond Art Museum, Indiana University East, the Northern Indiana Arts Association, Indiana State Museum and the National Black Fine Art Show held annually in New York. Her work is included in the permanent collections of the Indiana State Museum, the Indiana Governor's Residence, Indiana University, Richmond Community Schools, the Richmond Art Museum and Reid Memorial Hospital in Richmond. Cruse-Griffin teaches art at Richmond Senior High School, where she won two Teacher of the Year awards in 2010–2011.

== See also ==
- Eskenazi Health Art Collection
- Sidney & Lois Eskenazi Hospital
