= Helene Hibben =

American sculptor

- Born: November 18, 1882; Indianapolis, Indiana, US
- Died: March 18, 1968 (aged 85); Greenfield, Indiana, US
- Burial place: Crown Hill Cemetery and Arboretum, Section 42, Lot 218; 39.8214090°N 86.1666707°W
- Occupation: Sculptor

Helene Hibben (November 18, 1882– March 18, 1968) was an American artist from Indianapolis. Hibben was a sculptor and is a confirmed participant in the Indianapolis City Hospital Project. She created a large bronze statue for the creation of the Burdsal Units. It can still be seen on the campus of Sidney and Lois Eskenazi Hospital. She spent a large portion of her life in childcare, caring for children during World War II and teaching at her own school. In 1917, Hibben founded the Hibben school for kindergarten and primary grades.

== Biography ==
Hibben was born on November 18, 1882, to Thomas E. Hibben and Jane Merrill Ketcham Hibben. The Hibbens, had two other children, a son, Thomas, and a daughter, Hazen. She grew up in Indianapolis, Indiana, and received training at the Pratt Institute in New York City as a child. She attended the Benjamin Harris School and Shortridge High School. Helene Hibben was a student under William Forsyth, and later studied at the Chicago Art Institute under Lorado Taft and the Art Students League of New York, where she studied under James Earle Fraser. Helene Hibben died in 1968 at age 86 in a nursing home. She was buried in Crown Hill Cemetery

== Career in art ==
Helene Hibben was a participant in the Indianapolis City Hospital Project, and produced the large, bronze dedication plaque for the new Burdsal Units built in 1914. Before the tablet, Hibben had few large-scale opportunities; she had been limited to working with small figures that were created in her garden, such as vases, small plaques, and tiles, which featured illustrations of nursery rhymes. The plaque measures three by eight feet, and it can still be found on the campus of Sidney and Lois Eskenazi Hospital. Hibben spent a large portion of her career outside of the City Hospital Project teaching at the John Herron Art Institute. In 1936, Hibben's work was featured in an exhibit at the Irvington Artists' Exhibition. Her work featured a variety of sculptures, including four small heads which were modeled years before and were cast in plaster. The works were described as "exceedingly artistic."

== Career in childcare and education ==
During World War II, Helene Hibben's creation of art declined as she made teaching and childcare her priority. She cared for children from 6 o'clock in the morning until 6 o'clock in the evening, five days a week for their parents; the fathers were at war, and the mothers were in war work. She considered the work to be of great value, and was willing to take a break from her sculpting to so it.

Hibben owned and operated the Hibben School for preschool children with her sister, Hazen Hibben. The school's building was created in 1926 by Thomas Hibben. The school started with six pupils and grew to 120 pupils by 1929. At least two-thirds of the children in Irvington attended the school in its lifetime. Her background in art encouraged her to design educational toys, which she used in her school. In addition to teaching kindergarten classes, Helene Hibben conducted dance classes for students of all ages, from toddlers to college students. She taught grace, poise, rhythm, co-ordination, and aimed to provide a strong foundation for health and technical knowledge of all types of dance. Hibben taught at the school until 1963.

Helene Hibben was both a student and a teacher of French. She taught the language to children in her kindergarten classes, successfully teaching them how to converse. Her students created a paper doll theater to strengthen their skills and encourage use of the language. The act of participating in the paper doll theater entertained the children, who thought of it as nothing more than playing, but it also expanded their French vocabulary. Hibben wrote a small play called "The House That Jack Build" for the students to perform. Its two performances, which took place inside Hibben's home, received full houses. The children's play had such success that it was repeated at Irvington's motion picture house under the auspices of the Irvington Parent-Teacher's Club for the benefit of the French relief fund. Hibben would take her pupils on various trips to encourage their language skills. She took them on motor trips to the country, asking them to give the French names of the things they saw. They also went on sketching trips where they would only speak in French and would work on improving their drawing skills.
