= Emma B. King =

American painter

- Born: 1857; Indianapolis, Indiana
- Died: 1933 (aged 75–76)
- Known for: Painting
- Movement: American Impressionism

Emma B. King (1857–1933) was an American Impressionist from Indiana. She began her career as an artist in late 20s, and was a known participant in the Indianapolis City Hospital Project.

== Career ==
King began her art training as a student at the Art Association of Indianapolis and later studied at the Art Students League of New York. She also studied at the Academie Julian in Paris and the Shinnecock Hills Summer School of Art in Long Island, NY. King painted many landscapes of the east coast, and some of the midwest as well. However, King was not regarded as one of the most devoted regionalists within the Hoosier Group. King was a well-documented participant in the Indianapolis City Hospital Project and was one of only three women to be chosen to participate in the project. King produced two murals for the hospital collection, entitled Hope and Hope Fulfilled. However, these paintings have been lost.

King was also a highly regarded poet and won awards from the Poetry Society of Great Britain and a Writers Club contest in 1927.

== Awards ==
- Poetry Society
- Writers' Club Contest (1927)
