= Carl Graf =

American painter (1892–1947)

Carl C. Graf
- Born: 1892
- Died: 1947 (aged 54–55)
- Occupation: Painter

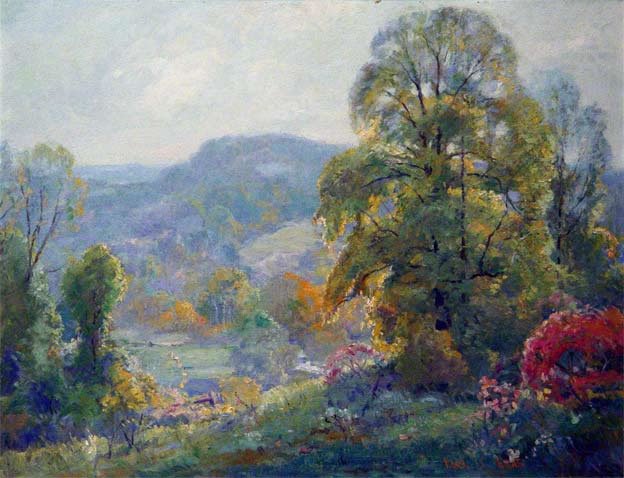
Landscape

Carl Christopher Graf (September 27, 1892 – 1947) was an American impressionist painter from Indiana. Graf was known for having been an artist in the Hoosier Group and a participant in the City Hospital mural project.

== Biography ==
Carl Christopher Graf grew up in Bedford, Indiana. Shortly after he graduated from Bedford High School, he began working for the Bedford Daily Democrat, sketching cartoons for the paper. After working with the Bedford Daily Democrat, Graf enrolled at the John Herron Art Institute.

== Career ==
Graf began his career as an artist after graduating high school with the Bedford Daily Democrat. He sketched drawings for the Bedford Daily Democrat as a cartoonist. Shortly after, Graf left to enroll at the John Herron Art Institute for classes in sculpture and portrait painting. Graf became heavily involved with the City Hospital Project in 1914, and was one of the artists that lived in the hospital through the duration of the project. Unlike many of the artist involved in the project, Graf was an experienced mural artist and helped supervise the installation of many of the murals. Graf produced landscape, fairy tale and classical figure art that was displayed in the African-American women's surgical, medical, and obstetrical ward, and in the pediatric ward of the City Hospital. In the Children's Ward, Graf painted a seven-panel series of six-feet tall paintings illustrating the story of Cinderella. In the hallway leading to the pediatric ward, Graf painted Elfin Grove, The Grimm Brother's story of how the four seasons were created from perpetual sunshine and flames. After completion of the City Hospital project, Graf began studying at the Academy of Fine Arts in Philadelphia and at the Art Students League of New York. Graf also studied at the Cincinnati Academy of Art before returning to Indianapolis to open a studio. Graf, along with several members of the Hoosier Group, made frequent trips to Brown County to paint the Brown County landscape. Graf eventually settled in Brown County, marrying Genevieve Goth, the sister of another Brown County artist, Marie Goth. Carl Graf died in 1947 at the age of 54.

== Awards ==
- Halcomb Prize, 1918
