= Martinus Andersen =

American artist

- Born: Martin Andersen; 1878; Peru, Indiana
- Died: 1942 (aged 63–64)
- Education: William Forsyth, J. Ottis Adams, Wabash College
- Known for: American Impressionism, Modernism, Painting

Martinus Andersen (1878 – 1942) was an American Impressionist painter known for his Indiana landscapes. He also had a career as a professional photographer in New York.

== Youth and early education ==
Martinus Andersen was born to Christina and Paul Andersen, two Danish immigrants. Martinus was the oldest of three, and Paul Andersen died soon after the birth of the third child. Christina struggled financially to raise the three children alone and relied on Martinus, the oldest, for financial assistance. Martinus and his mother did not see eye-to-eye, as he was an aspiring drawer at the time, and Christina Andersen relied on him for help within the home. Something that occurred that increased tensions between the two was when Martinus was fired from a job at a wool mill for drawing caricatures of his fellow employees. Martinus left the home when he was just 17, but continued to work in Indiana and Ohio for several years.

== Personal life ==
While at Wabash College Andersen met his future wife, Nellie McKee, whom he met while drawing illustrations for genre fiction. Andersen and his wife, Nellie, had two children while living in the Indianapolis area during that part of Andersen's career.

== Central Indiana career ==
After working in Cincinnati, Andersen came to Wabash College to study in 1902. Andersen was very involved on campus, and helped illustrate The Wabash Magazine in 1902–3. However, Andersen moved to Indianapolis, Indiana in 1903 after completing his introductory courses at Wabash. Andersen began illustrating for Indiana Electrotype Co., and after working in Indianapolis for a few months returned to Crawfordsville to marry Nellie McKee. In 1905, Andersen began studying at the Herron Institute under fellow Wabash man and Hoosier Group member, John Ottis Adams, as well as Hoosier Group leader and City Hospital Project manager, William Forsyth. Andersen exhibited his art in the Portfolio Club in 1908 and in several Society of Western Artists exhibitions. Andersen was regarded by a particular Indianapolis critic as having an exceptional ability to “express the real spirit of the middle West with its broad plains and sense of bigness.” In 1914, Andersen assisted with the Indianapolis City Hospital project, along with 15 other artists from Indiana, and was one of the artists in the project that actually lived in the hospital while working.

Between 1914 and 1915, Andersen adopted a new style of painting and gave several talks promoting the newer styles of painting, such as cubism and futurism. This decision separated him from other Hoosier Group artists, who continued to paint landscapes and stick to impressionism.

Andersen had been awarded two second-place finishes in the Richmond Annual Exhibition during his career in Indiana: once in 1913 and once more in 1914. In 1915, Andersen was also chosen to participate in the Indiana Exhibit in the Panama-Pacific Exhibition in San Francisco. Andersen began giving talks about modern art, the first in his hometown and several more at Herron later on in 1915.

== New York City career ==
Andersen decided to move to New York City in 1915 to advance his career as an artist. Many believe this was caused by difficulties between Forsyth and Andersen, that came as a result of Andersen's newfound artistic views. Another possibility, however, is that Andersen wanted to test the artistic waters in the art capital of the nation. While in New york City, Andersen became a professional photographer, but continuing to paint until his death in New York City in 1942.
