= Aaron T Stephan =

American artist

- Born: 1974 (age 51–52); Springfield, New York, US
- Occupation: Artist
- Website: aarontstephan.com

Aaron T Stephan (born in 1974) is an American artist based in Portland, Maine. His work includes sculpture, mixed media, performance, and installation art has been featured at a number of exhibitions, collections, and festivals.

== Early life and education ==
Stephan was born in Springville, New York in 1974. He holds a BFA from the State University of New York at Purchase (1996) and an MFA from Maine College of Art (2002). He also studied at Amsterdamse Hogeschool voor de Kunsten, State University of New York at New Paltz, and the Skowhegan School of Painting and Sculpture.

== Career and work ==
Stephan's work uses humor and wit to look at everyday objects "not as metaphors...but [as] facts." In 2008, as artist-in-residence at Kohler's Arts/Industry program in Sheboygan, Wisconsin, Stephan created the cast iron Flat World/Round Map. It is a reproduction of Buckminster Fuller's Dymaxion map but rounded rather than flat. In 2017, during a residency with Locust Projects in Miami, Florida, he made hundreds of cement blocks from scratch, then built a life-sized cement block house from plans found in a 1909 Sears and Roebuck catalog. This exhibit was called Cement Houses and How to Build Them. A 2019 work, Intermediate Submittal, shows the house reproduced as a scale model. Stephan has also completed residencies at Yaddo and Edenfred.

Art-World iconography also appears in several of Stephan's works, including Second-hand Utopias (2014) in DeCordova Sculpture Park and Museum. It consists of four iconic 20th century sculptures by artists such as Donald Judd, Robert Smithson, and Vladamir Tatlin. Similarly, the Untitled Monument series (2020) at Dowling Walsh Gallery in Rockland, Maine consists of cyanotype blueprints depicting failed real-life monuments. Among these are a toppling statue of Vladimir Lenin and the Stonewall Jackson Monument hanging mid-air by a removal crane. Other artwork includes his 2007 Building Houses and Hiding Under Rocks, where Stephan used over 40,000 books to make a square structure with doorway on one side. While the exterior looks like stacks of books, the interior is carved to look like stone blocks.

Stephan has collaborated with life-partner Lauren Fensterstock on multiple projects, including a series of performance dinner parties. In 2016, they teamed up with Portland chef Masa Miyake for a dinner-themed 9-night production titled Inside, Outside, Above, Below and combined cooking, eating, architecture, live building, live music, and video.

== Selected works ==
=== Solo exhibitions ===
- 2003: Weighing My Options, Space Gallery (Portland, Maine)
- 2007: The Problem with Ladders, Whitney Artworks (Portland, Maine)
- 2008: Building Houses/Hiding Under Rocks, Quint Contemporary Art (La Jolla, California)
- 2009: Vessels Absent, University of Maine Museum of Art (Bangor, Maine)
- 2011: Corporeal, Aucocisco Gallery (Portland, Maine)
- 2013: Second-Hand Utopias, DeCordova Sculpture Park and Museum (Lincoln, Massachusetts)
- 2014: To Borrow, Cut, Copy and Steal, Portland Museum of Art (Portland, Maine)
- 2016: Book/House, Quint Contemporary Art (Ja Jolla, California)
- 2017: Cement Houses and How to Build Them, Locust Projects (Miami, Florida)
- 2021: Untitled Monuments, Dowling Walsh Gallery (Rockland, Maine)

=== Group exhibitions ===
- 2003: Portland Biennial, Portland Museum of Art (Portland, Maine)
- 2004: Home, DUMBO Art Center (Brooklyn, New York)
- 2006: CMCA Biennial Exhibition, Center for Maine Contemporary Art (Rockland, Maine)
- 2008: The Moment at Hand, John Michael Kohler Arts Center (Sheboygan, Wisconsin)
- 2009: Three Decades of Contemporary Art, California Center for the Arts (Escondido, California)
- 2010: 4 in Maine, Farnsworth Art Museum (Rockland, Maine)
- 2012: Portes, Mytilene Public Gallery (Mytilene, Greece)
- 2015: Me, Mona and Mao, Portland Museum of Art (Portland, Maine)
- 2015: Pulse NY Art Fair, Sienna Gallery (New York City, New York)
- 2018: Land-Sc(r)aping, Living Arts (Tulsa, Oklahoma)
- 2019: 10,000 Hours +, Speedwell Projects (Portland, Maine)
- 2020: Cyanotypes, Cove Street Arts (Portland, Maine)

=== Performances/events ===
- 2006: Aaron T Stephan Is a Hack, Institute of Contemporary Art (Portland, Maine)
- 2011: Another Evening of BS with Aaron T Stephan, Space Gallery (Portland, Maine)
- 2014: Substance, a series of culinary events at the artist's home (Portland, Maine)
- 2015: Inside, Outside, Above, Below, Thompson's Point (Portland, Maine)
- 2018: Oyster/Block (Athens, Georgia)
- 2019: Point of Failure (Portland, Maine)

=== Permanent commissions ===
- 2009: Intersect, Armstrong–Jackman Border Crossing (Jackman, Maine)
- 2011: Paths Open, Jefferson Village School (Jefferson, Maine)
- 2013: Paths Crossed, Wishard Hospital (Indianapolis, Indiana)
- 2015: Variations, Texas Tech University (Lubbock, Texas)
- 2016: Gold Pour, RTD Gold Strike Station (Arvada, Colorado)
- 2016: Point of View, Salt Palace Convention Center (Salt Lake City, Utah)
- 2018: Paths Woven, San Diego International Airport (San Diego, California)
- 2019: Luminous Arbor, City of Portland, Maine (Portland, Maine)
- 2020: Luminous Remembrance, Lubbock Tornado Memorial (Lubbock, Texas)
- 2021: Woven Lines (Altoona, Iowa)
- 2021: Paths Rising, Tampa International Airport (Tampa, Florida)
- 2021: Luminous Bound, Montana RTS Far East Transfer Center (El Paso, Texas)
