= Eskenazi Health Art Collection =

Art collection

The Eskenazi Health Art Collection consists of a wide variety of artworks composed of fragments from the 1914 City Hospital mural and artwork project, artworks added over time, and newer pieces which include works created for the new Sidney & Lois Eskenazi Hospital and campus in 2013. Other works have been added occasionally; there are also artworks at the clinics throughout Marion County.

== 1914 City Hospital mural and artwork project ==
In 1911, the Indianapolis City Hospital expanded by adding two dedicated patient buildings, the Burdsal Units, named after Alfred Burdsal, a wealthy businessman and the project's benefactor. St. Margaret's Hospital Guild, a local women's volunteer group dedicated to supporting the City Hospital, donated money for decoration of the new wards. While the amount of St. Margaret's donation is unclear, sources indicate it was $200 – $1,000. The Guild approached the president of the City Board of Health, Dr. T. Victor Keene, who consulted local artists, including Clifton Wheeler and Wayman Adams, and a large-scale mural project began to develop.

Sixteen of Indiana's “finest and most promising” artists were invited to contribute to the mural project. Despite the limited budget, these artists committed to completing the project for the wages of a union house painter, approximately $75–100 per month. William Forsyth, who also served as head of the Herron School of Art, was assigned the position of project supervisor and earned $125–150 per month. Over the course of the year-long project, in an effort to subsidize increasing costs, several artists lived in the hospital and received meals from the hospital kitchens. In addition to St. Margaret's Hospital Guild's initial funding, the City Board of Health and several other private donations of both money and supplies supported the project, resulting in a total project cost of approximately $10,000.

Mural artists collectively selected the rooms, hallways, and wards for their painting and agreed that the work should make use of soothing scenes and tones.

=== William Forsythe's influence ===
While the subject matter of each mural was left to artist's discretion, William Forsyth, as general supervisor, selected a color palette in muted tones to be used by all artists in their work:

“Forsyth laid down a rather broad panel or general scheme of colors for the project. The composition and execution, however, of the various murals were done in toto by the individual artists assigned to that part of the project.” -Dr. T. Victor Keene, President of the City Board of Health

=== Murals ===
The murals, which collectively featured landscapes, portraits, Biblical scenes, and images from children's fairytales, were painted or hung on the upper half of the walls to increase visibility for hospital patients lying in bed. Artists also softened both colors and shading to compensate for the stark white hospital walls, which detracted from the paintings.

The majority of the mural project artists painted their works on sheets of high-grade canvas before mounting the mural to the hospital walls using a mixture of white lead and damar varnish. Once hung, the adhesive was further secured by covering the completed murals with thick layers of varnish. While most artists worked on-site at the hospital, a few painted the canvases in their own studios - T.C. Steele in Brown County, J. Ottis Adams in Brookville, and Wayman Adams in Indianapolis. Artist William Edouard Scott was the only artist to paint directly on wall-mounted canvases.

When the City Hospital Project opened to the public on November 28, 1914, it featured a quarter mile of artwork, or 33 murals in many subdivided parts, created by 16 Indiana artists, and was the first and only public hospital in the world to feature artwork of this type and scale. A 1919 Modern Hospital feature on the murals commented, “In such surroundings, the paintings cannot be isolated and considered as pictures. They can only be felt as somehow a part - and a really necessary part - of the stream of life that is flowing steadily through the institution.”

On opening day, Indianapolis News called the project the “first great milestone in Indiana art,” but the initial enthusiasm was soon eclipsed by both World War I and limited public access to the murals. By 1967, several of the murals had been drilled through, painted over, cut to make doorways, removed, or lost, and imminent renovation plans for the Burdsal units further endangered the collection. St. Margaret's Hospital Guild, whose donation initially funded the project, led efforts to save the work, and most of the murals were removed to be stored at the Indiana State Museum for the duration of hospital construction. Several of the murals were also slated for restoration, including eight T.C. Steele murals, which were subsequently restored and displayed at the museum. Unfortunately, much of the conservation work completed at this time was poorly executed. As a result of being adhered to plaster walls, several murals were torn when removed from their original locations, the rips covered in excess with putty and painted over before the works were mounted on masonite panels and framed. In the mid-late 1970s, with building renovations complete, the murals were returned and placed in various auditoriums, conference rooms, and private rooms throughout the hospital.

=== A new life ===
In 2004, the Indiana Historical Society and the hospital organization, then Wishard Memorial Hospital, collaborated to produce an exhibition of the murals in celebration of the hospital's 140th anniversary. “The Art of Healing: The Wishard Art Collection,” curated by Cinnamon Catlin-Legutko, displayed 25 of the historic murals at the Indiana History Center and was accompanied by publication of an exhibition and collection catalog of the same name. In conjunction with the exhibition, another campaign was launched to fund restoration the paintings, many of which were subjected to insufficient conservation efforts of the 1960s. This time, mural conservation was led by the Indianapolis Museum of Art. In early 2009, the museum hosted “Preserving a Legacy: The Wishard Hospital Murals,” which featured 13 murals that were either conserved, in the process of being conserved, or were slated for conservation by the museum.

Today, 38 mural fragments, representing 13 of the original murals, remain and compose the historic portion of the Eskenazi Health Art Collection. Thirty-one of these fragments are publicly displayed at the organization's Sidney & Lois Eskenazi Hospital.

=== Artists represented ===
- J. Ottis Adams
- Wayman Elbridge Adams
- Martinus Andersen
- Simon Baus
- Francis Focer Brown
- Jay Hall Connaway
- William Forsyth
- Carl Graf
- Helene Hibben
- Walter Hixon Isnogle
- Emma B. King
- Dorothy Morlan
- William Edouard Scott
- Otto Stark
- T. C. Steele
- Clifton Wheeler

=== Historic collection today ===
Thirty-eight mural fragments remain the historic collection, representing 13 of the original 33 murals. This list represents only those works currently on view on the Sidney & Lois Eskenazi Hospital campus.

== New collection ==
A century after the City Hospital mural project, in December 2013, the health organization's new Sidney & Lois Eskenazi Hospital campus opened featuring work by sixteen commissioned artists as a reimagining of the historic endeavor. These art works provide the foundation of the organization's new collection, to which several other works have since been added.

Michael Kaufmann, director of special projects and civic investment for Health & Hospital Corporation of Marion County, describes Eskenazi Health's new collection as “approachable and understandable, with themes relevant to the local community that reflect Indiana’s history of art and culture while, in the spirit of public art, respecting the sensibilities of [Eskenazi Health]'s broad base of patients, staff and visitors.”

=== 2013 commissions ===
The opening of the Sidney & Lois Eskenazi Hospital campus in December 2013 featured a reimagining of the 1914 commissions that compose the historic collection. In an effort to produce a cohesive design that addressed “the mind, soul, and the body of the patient,” hospital architects and designers, driven by evidence-based design principles, prioritized three elements: natural light, views of nature, and art in public areas. Hospital architects, Indianapolis-based Blackburn Architects, managed the hospital organization's public art program development, which began in 2010 with a nationwide request for qualifications that sought work “to complement the site, architecture and interior design program of the new hospital complex in creating an environment that makes [Eskenazi Health]'s patients feel welcome, facilitates their healing, and reinforces [Eskenazi Health]'s mission and community identity.” The request received more than 500 applicants from 39 states, which were then narrowed to 54 finalists by an independent jury. Each of the 54 proposals was assigned an area of the new hospital by Eskenazi Health's art committee and publicly displayed in the existing Wishard Hospital and online for public comment; more than 3,000 public comments on the final proposals were collected and analyzed in the final selection.

==== Artworks ====
As with the 1914 commissions, the art committee selected 16 artists to create work that supported “the sense of optimism, vitality, and energy” for the new campus. These artists represent the diversity of the Indianapolis community, including native Hoosiers and artists born or living in Indiana, and artists representing women, minorities and people with disabilities. More than half – 57.8 percent – of the art program comes from local artists, while 47 percent of the artists are of minority populations; 31.5 percent are female; 10.5 percent are veterans; 5.2 percent are artists with disabilities; and 5.2 percent of artists represented are seniors.

"A century ago, the St. Margaret's Hospital Guild brought together prominent artists to paint murals – more than a quarter mile of them – for what was then City Hospital’s new building but, more central to their artistic ambitions, to lift spirits. It is our great responsibility to honor and carry this legacy forward." -Matthew R. Gutwein, president and CEO of Health & Hospital Corporation of Marion County

The entire collection was documented in the Public Art Archive, which is a project of the Western States Arts Federation (WESTAF).

Artist	Title of artwork
Adam Frank	Arbor
Tim Ryan	Balance
Loretta Pettway Bennett	Blues
Kathy Bradford	Calm Waters
Malcolm Mobutu Smith	Cloud Busting
Ismeal Muhammud Nieves	Crossroads I and II
India Cruse-Griffin	Fig Houses
Loretta Pettway Bennett	Forever (For Old Lady Sally)
India Cruse-Griffin	Friends
India Cruse-Griffin	Hope Skip and Jump
Richard Ross	It was just last year...
Rob Ley	May/September
India Cruse-Griffin	Melody at Hand
Mason Archie	Morning on the White River
Aaron Stephan	Paths Crossed
Loretta Pettway Bennett	Sew Low
India Cruse-Griffin	Sunday Morning
Margo Sawyer	Synchronicity of Color
Project One	Temporal Synapse
Casey Roberts	The Arrival
India Cruse-Griffin	Two Moons
Artur Silva	Untitled #77
Artur Silva	Untitled #78
Loretta Pettway Bennett	Vegetation
India Cruse-Griffin	Wading in the Water

=== Additional works ===
Since the 2013 commissions, additional works have occasionally been added to the collection.

=== Recognition ===
Two works created as part of the 2013 commissions for the new Sidney and Lois Eskenazi Hospital campus are recipients of the Americans for the Arts Public Art Network (PAN) Year in Review award, the highest recognition for public art in the United States. Adam Frank's Arbor, a permanent interior installation, received the PAN Year in Review award in 2014. Rob Ley's May/September, a 12,000 square foot installation on the exterior of the Sidney and Lois Eskenazi Hospital Parking Garage, was a 2015 award recipient.

== See also ==
- Indiana Statehouse Public Art Collection
- Indiana University – Purdue University Indianapolis Public Art Collection
