= Sidney & Lois Eskenazi Hospital =

Hospital in Indianapolis, Indiana, US

- Eskenazi Health
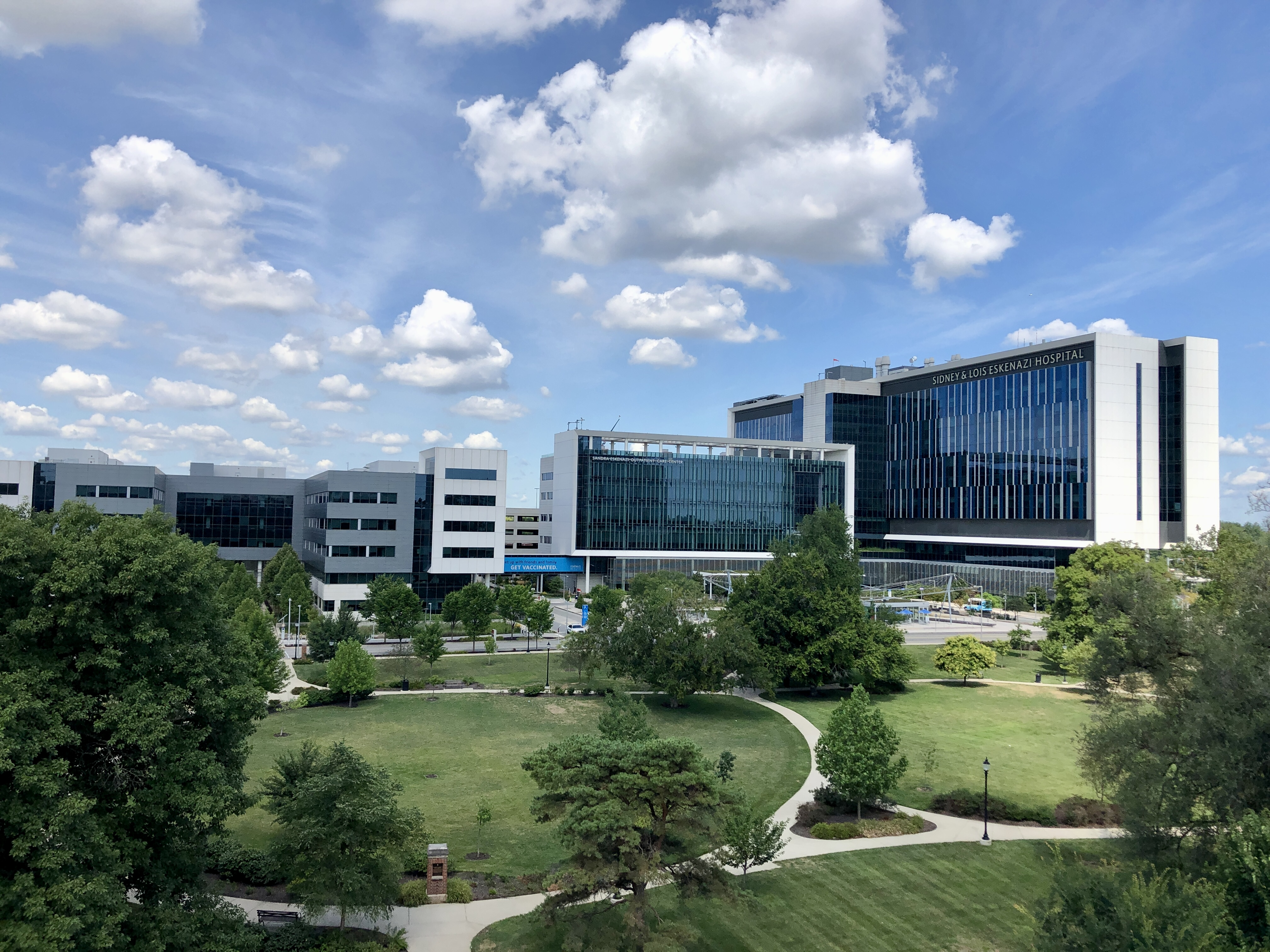
- Eskenazi Hospital and Ball Nurses' Sunken Garden and Convalescent Park in 2022

Geography
- Location: 720 Eskenazi Ave., Indianapolis, Indiana, United States
- Coordinates: 39°46′38″N 86°11′02″W

Organization
- Type: Public
- Affiliated university: None
- Patron: None
- Network: Eskenazi Health

Services
- Emergency department: Level I trauma center
- Beds: 315

Helipads
- Helipad: Yes

History
- Founded: 1859

Links
- Website: Eskenazi Hospital
- Lists: Hospitals in Indiana

The Sidney & Lois Eskenazi Hospital is a public hospital located in Indianapolis, Indiana, United States. The hospital is the flagship medical center for Eskenazi Health, founded in 1859 as Indiana's oldest public healthcare system. The hospital is operated by Health and Hospital Corporation of Marion County. The current hospital opened December 7, 2013, less than 1,300 feet (400 m) to the west of the original campus, replacing Wishard Memorial Hospital.

Many of Eskenazi Hospital's 4,620 medical staff are provided by a mix of faculty, residents, and students of the adjacent Indiana University School of Medicine. The hospital is an Adult Level I Trauma Center and serves about 1 million outpatients annually.

== History ==
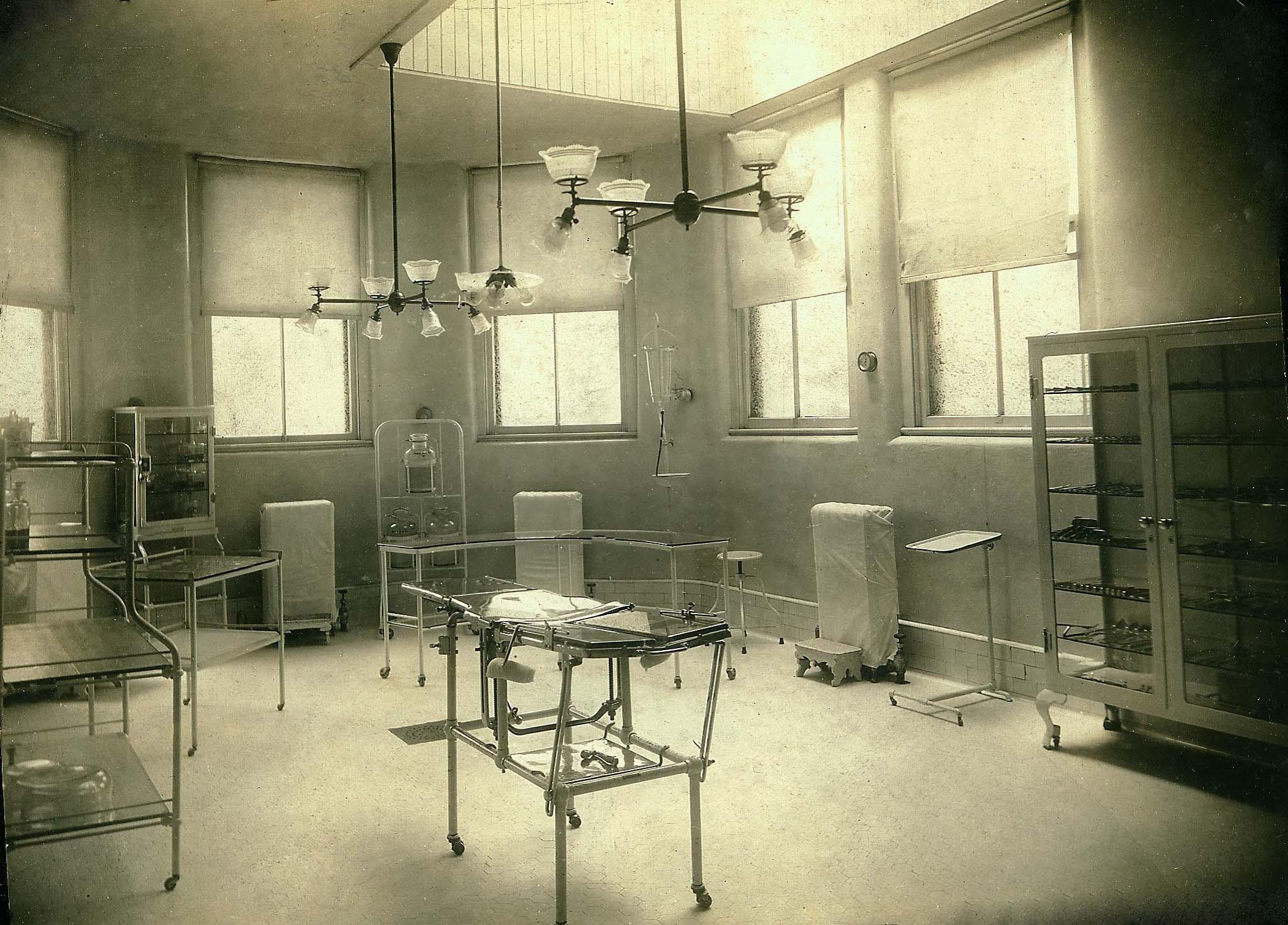
An infant operating table in Wishard Hospital, c. 1916

The hospital was founded as Indianapolis City Hospital in 1859 in response to a smallpox epidemic in the city. During the Civil War, the hospital was used by the Union Army to treat some 13,000 sick and wounded soldiers. The hospital reverted to community control after the war. In 1943, the hospital became the first in the U.S. to coordinate ambulance dispatch via two-way radios.

In the 20th century, the main facility was located at 1001 West 10th Street and went through several name changes, including: Indianapolis General Hospital (1947); Marion County General Hospital (1959); and Wishard Memorial Hospital (1975). The Wishard name was selected to honor Dr. William N. Wishard, a leading physician in Indianapolis. The main hospital campus included the Myers Building (Intensive Care, Labor and Delivery, OB/GYN, Surgery, and General Medicine Wards) as well as other buildings housing the Level I trauma center, Level I Burn Unit, Psychiatric Care, Prisoner Care, Outpatient Surgery, Therapy, Long Term Care, and various clinics. Wishard Memorial became Indiana's first certified Level I trauma center in 1992.

Due to the aging of the physical plant and its inefficiencies, plans were made to construct an entirely new hospital. On November 3, 2009, 85 percent of Marion County voters approved a major bond referendum for the development of a new public medical center. On June 22, 2011, Wishard Health Services announced that the new hospital would be named in honor of Indianapolis real estate developers and philanthropists Sidney and Lois Eskenazi, who had donated $40 million for the new hospital.

== Building ==
Construction for the $754 million Sidney & Lois Eskenazi Hospital started in 2010 and opened to the public on December 7, 2013. Situated on 37 acres (15 ha) on the Indiana University–Purdue University Indianapolis (IUPUI) campus, the complex covers 1,200,000 square feet (110,000 m^{2}) over 11 floors above ground and is 280 feet (85 m) in height. A connected 2,700-space parking garage is also located on the campus. HOK was the project's lead architect, while Jacobs Engineering Group was project manager.

Eskenazi Hospital contains 315 inpatient beds, 200 examination rooms, 17 operating rooms, 12 labor and delivery rooms, Central Indiana's only adult burn center, and one of only three Adult Level I trauma centers in the state.

=== Sustainability and wellness ===
Eskenazi Hospital was certified as a Leadership in Energy and Environmental Design (LEED) Gold building in 2015. The LEED Gold designation was notable for being Indiana's first.

Eskenazi Hospital's front entrance is flanked by a 1.5 acres (0.61 ha) plaza, called The Commonground, which features 5,000 perennial plants, a trellis sculpture, lawns, public seating, Healing Waters dry-deck fountain, the St. Margaret's Hospital Guild Limestone Falls, and the Frank & Katrina Basile Pavilion. The Basile Pavilion is home to Duos, an Indianapolis-based restaurant serving local food. The Commonground was designed by Philadelphia-based landscape architecture and urban design firm David Rubin Land Collective, with The Olin Studio and Diller Scofidio + Renfro. The plaza opened to the public in July 2014.

Eskenazi Hospital has been recognized for its emphasis on growing and serving local and healthy food options. In 2016, the Physicians Committee for Responsible Medicine ranked Eskenazi sixth of 24 hospitals recognized nationwide for providing fresh vegetables, whole grains, cholesterol-free entrees, and soy milk. The hospital produces about two tons of produce annually from its 5,000 square feet (460 m^{2}) rooftop gardens, called the Sky Farm. Of the $3.4 million annual food budget, the hospital manages to allocate 40 percent to Indiana farm and food suppliers, serving about 113,000 meals monthly.

== Art collection ==
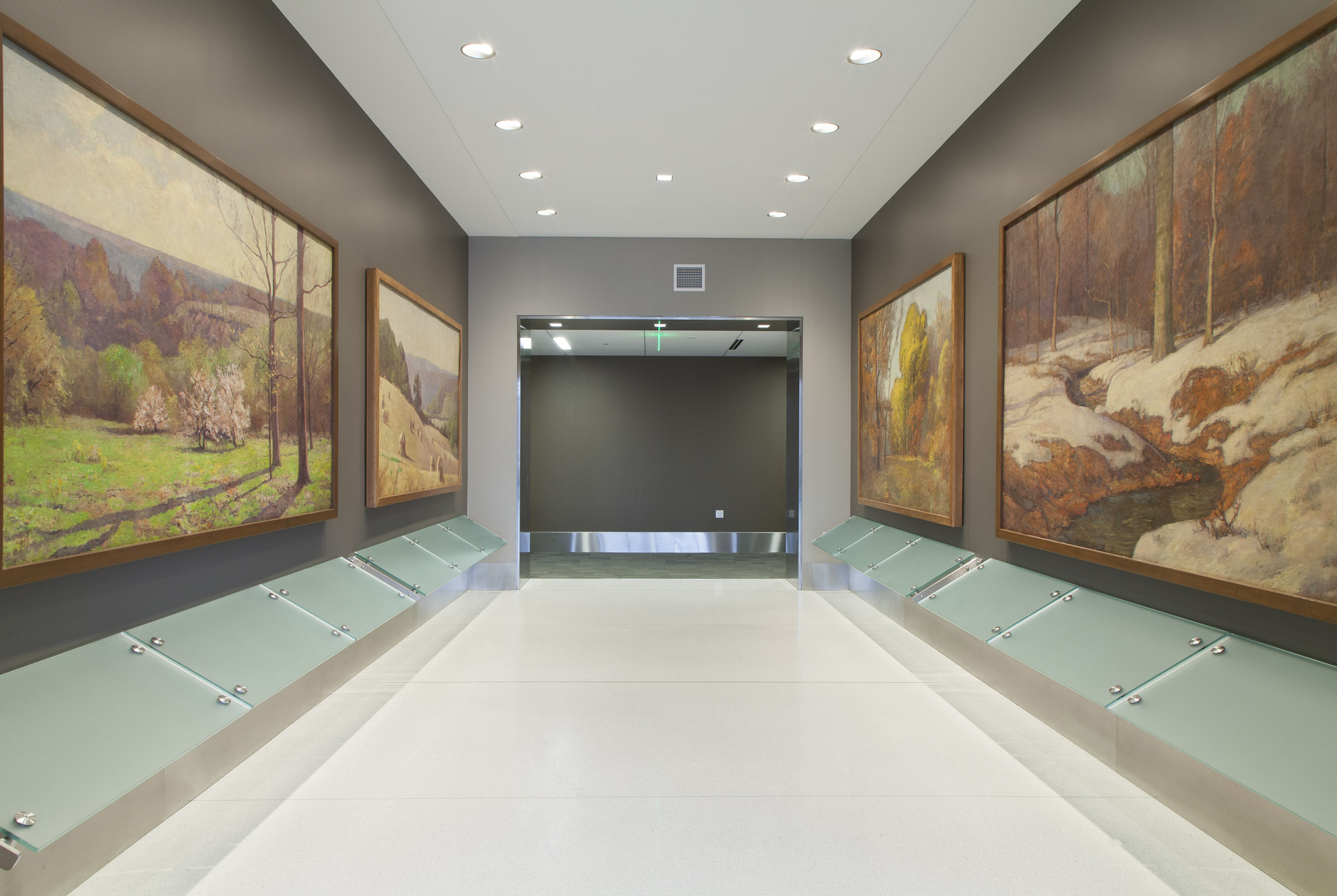
Hoosier Group painter T. C. Steele's Four Seasons on display at Eskenazi.

The Eskenazi Health Art Collection is part of the hospital's commitment to wellness and includes more than 30 artworks on public display. Many of the permanent installations have won national awards.

== See also ==
- List of hospitals in Indianapolis
- List of burn centers in the United States
- List of public hospitals in the United States
- List of trauma centers in the United States
- List of former United States Army medical units
- List of tallest buildings in Indianapolis
- List of tallest buildings in Indiana
