= List of Ball State University alumni =

This is a list of notable alumni of Ball State University.

== Arts, literature, and entertainment ==
- Christine Barger, actress
- Ellen Bryan, television personality and Miss Ohio 2011
- Claire Buffie, photographer and Miss New York 2010
- Angelin Chang, educator and lawyer
- Frances Currey (1925–2012), artist
- India Cruse-Griffin, artist and educator
- Jim Davis, cartoonist, screenwriter, and producer; best known as the creator of Garfield
- Philip F. Deaver (1946–2018), writer and poet who graduated from St. Joseph's College in 1968; O. Henry and Flannery O'Connor awards winner
- Andy Devine (1905–1977), actor
- Joyce DeWitt, actress
- Ashley C. Ford, writer, podcaster, and educator
- Danny Gaither (1938–2001), gospel singer; best known for his work with the Bill Gaither Trio
- Stedman Graham, publicist and author; long-time companion of Oprah Winfrey
- Scott Halberstadt, retired actor
- Malina Simone Jeffers, community organizer and co-founder of Ganggang
- Doug Jones, actor
- David Letterman, television host, comedian, writer, and producer; The Letterman Foundation for Courtesy and Grooming has been a repeated contributor to the university
- Mike Lopresti, national sportswriter for Gannett News Service
- Cheryl Anne Lorance, artist
- David Loughery (1953–2024), screenwriter and film producer
- Ess McKee, artist
- Larry Monroe (1942–2014), radio personality
- Anthony Montgomery, actor and graphic novelist
- Sister Edith Pfau (1915–2001), painter, sculptor, and art educator
- Sam Smith, sportswriter
- Israel Solomon, artist
- Kim Sun-a (김선아), South Korean actress
- Tiara Thomas, R&B singer
- Nelly Vuksic, Argentine conductor and musician
- Bill Wallace, martial artist, former professional kickboxer, and actor
- Cynda Williams, actress

== Business ==
- Angela Ahrendts, British-American businesswoman
- Brian Gallagher, nonprofit executive
- Craig W. Hartman, honorary doctorate, architect and design partner at SOM
- Peter Jubeck (1936–2003), businessman
- Kent C. Nelson (1937–2023), businessman
- John Schnatter, founder and former chairman of Papa John's

== Politics and government ==
- Amanda Carpenter, author, political advisor, and speechwriter
- Christopher M. Goff, justice, Indiana Supreme Court (2017–present)
- Jeffrey D. Feltman, diplomat
- Suzette Kimball, 16th director of the United States Geological Survey, a bureau of the United States Department of the Interior
- Brent McMillan, former national political director for the Green Party
- Rodney C. Moen, former Wisconsin state senator
- Richard Mourdock, 53rd Indiana state treasurer
- Frank J. Mrvan, U.S. representative for Indiana's 1st congressional district (2021– )
- John Rarick (1924–2009), U.S. representative for Louisiana's 6th congressional district (1967–1975)

== Sports ==
=== National Football League ===
- Blaine Bishop, former NFL player, Tennessee Titans
- Robert Brewster, former NFL player (offensive tackle), Dallas Cowboys
- Rush Brown (1954–2020), NFL player (defensive tackle), St. Louis Cardinals
- Timmy Brown (1937–2020), NFL player (running back/returner), Philadelphia Eagles, actor
- Corey Croom, former NFL player (running back), New England Patriots
- Jerome Davis, former NFL player, Detroit Lions
- Reggie Hodges, former NFL player (punter)
- Ed Konopasek, former NFL player (offensive tackle), Green Bay Packers
- Brad Maynard, former NFL player (punter)
- Keith McKenzie, former NFL player (linebacker and defensive end)
- Bernie Parmalee, former NFL player and current running backs coach for the Carolina Panthers
- Danny Pinter, NFL player (center), Indianapolis Colts
- Dante Ridgeway, former NFL player (wide receiver)
- Terry Schmidt, dentist and former NFL player (cornerback)
- Willie Snead, NFL player (wide receiver)
- Shafer Suggs, former NFL player

=== National Basketball Association ===
- Theron Smith, former NBA player (small forward)
- Bonzi Wells, college basketball coach and former NBA player (shooting guard/small forward)

=== Major League Baseball ===
- Larry Bigbie, former MLB player (outfielder)
- Bryan Bullington, former MLB player (pitcher)
- Alex Call, MLB player (outfielder)
- Zach Cole, MLB player (outfielder)
- Jeremy Hazelbaker, former MLB player (outfielder)
- Thomas Howard, former MLB player (outfielder)
- Drey Jameson MLB player (pitcher)
- Chayce McDermott, MLB player (pitcher)
- Kyle Nicolas, MLB player (pitcher)
- Zach Plesac, MLB player (pitcher)
- Merv Rettenmund (1943–2024), NFL draft pick (Dallas Cowboys), 13-year MLB player (outfielder)
- Brad Snyder, former MLB player (outfielder)

=== Other athletes ===
- Jarrod Jones, American-Hungarian basketball player, Israeli Basketball Premier League
- Marcus Norris, former basketball player, 2003-04 Israeli Basketball Premier League Defensive Player of the Year
- John Paul Sr., former racing driver and fugitive
- Sunungura Rusununguko, former football player, Arena Football League
- Apsara Sakbun, swimmer who represented Cambodia in the 2024 Summer Olympics
- Jamill Smith, former football player (wide receiver)
- Terrence Watson, American-Israeli former basketball player, Israeli Basketball Premier League

== Other ==
- Arnie Ball, former men's volleyball coach at Purdue-Fort Wayne
- Bill Doba, football coach at Washington State University
- David Haugh, sports columnist for Chicago Tribune
- Brady Hoke, former head football coach, University of Michigan, San Diego State University and Ball State University
- Jon Hoke, assistant football coach with the Chicago Bears
- Ray McCallum, basketball coach at University of Detroit Mercy, Ball State, and University of Houston
- Mark Patrick, sports radio personality
- Kelly Sheffield, volleyball coach at Wisconsin, also coached at Albany 2001–2007 and Dayton 2008–2012
- Dave Shondell, women's volleyball coach at Purdue
- Don Shondell, ESPN and ABC collegiate volleyball commentator
- Craig Skinner, women's volleyball coach at Kentucky
- Jason Whitlock, commentator for Fox Sports One, former sports columnist for The Kansas City Star, AOL Sports, and ESPN.com
