= Indy Arts Council =

Arts nonprofit based in Indianapolis, Indiana, US

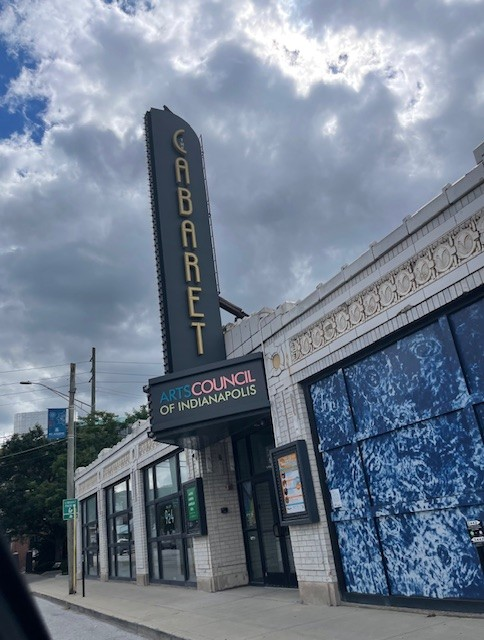
- The Indy Arts Council Headquarters
- Formation: 1987
- Headquarters: 924 N Pennsylvania St Indianapolis, IN 46204
- Location: Indianapolis, Indiana, United States
- President & CEO: Judith B. Thomas
- Budget: $1.7 m
- Website: https://indyarts.org/

The Indy Arts Council (sometimes referred to as the Arts Council of Indianapolis or Indianapolis Arts Council) is a nonprofit arts service organization based in Indianapolis that was established in 1987 by the Greater Indianapolis Progress Committee. The organization's purpose is to introduce the arts to new audiences through community outreach while bolstering creative innovation and economic development. The Indy Arts Council supports over 100 organizations including the Children's Museum of Indianapolis. They have also worked to include local artists in events they have organized in partnership with the Indianapolis 500, Super Bowl XLVI, NCAA Final Fours, Pacers Sports & Entertainment and the Indianapolis International Airport. The Arts Council generates funding from many notable institutions such as Indiana Arts Commission, Lilly Endowment, Indianapolis Foundation, and Allen Whitehill Clowes Charitable Foundation.

== History ==
In 1987, the 10th Pan American Games came to Indianapolis leading to the Indianapolis community becoming host to an arts festival that would build up to the games' opening ceremony. The arts festival involved almost 40 local arts organizations that produced more than 200 events. After the Pan American Arts Festival, the Indy Arts Council became its own agency, no longer just a branch of the Greater Indianapolis Progress Committee.

The Indy Arts Council opened the Indianapolis Artsgarden in September 1995 above the intersection of Washington and Illinois streets. This glass and steel dome connected to the Circle Center Mall was built using a donation of $12 million from the Lilly Endowment, Inc and has since been utilized as a venue for performances, exhibitions, and events.

Art & Soul is a program developed by the Indy Arts Council in 1997 to celebrate the beginning of Black History Month in Indianapolis. The festival, including live music, dance, poetry, and theater, helps local Black artists launch their careers while featuring free art exhibits for the public and other various festivities. The 2025 Art and Soul program began expanding beyond Black History Month with the help of the Madam Walker Legacy Center.

In 2010, Gallery 924 was developed by the Indy Arts Council in the organization's Pennsylvania Street headquarters after the Great Recession caused many of Indianapolis's local galleries to close.

A 2023 study showed that the nonprofit arts and culture sector in Indianapolis brought in more than $520 million in direct economic impact over the 2022-2023 year. That same year the Indy Arts Council gave funding to 85 local arts groups with a budget under $1.5 million. As a result of this study's findings, the Arts Council requested their funding to be bumped up from $1.3 to $3 million in 2024. The budget for 2025 was merely bumped from $1.3 to $1.7 million.

On June 25, 2025, the Indy Arts Council announced their five-year plan for 2025–2030 in the Indianapolis Artsgarden. The plan touches on the council's new mission "to champion arts and culture" in order to fulfill their vision of "a creative life for all". The Arts Council also developed five pillars they hoped to focus on during their five-year plan. These pillars included sustainable funding; everyday arts access; increased awareness; professional development and shared services; and arts and culture destination.

The Indy Arts Council also connects neighborhoods with local artist to paint signal boxes in representation of the area's history.

== Grant programs ==
=== Creative Renewal Arts Fellowship ===
In 1999, the Creative Renewal Arts Fellowship was created by the Indy Arts Council with the support of Lilly Endowment Inc. in order to help encourage local artistic talent to remain in the city. In its first 25 years of existence, the fellowship provided more than 500 grants to Indianapolis's musicians, dancers, arts administrators, thespians, authors, poets, and visual artist. Every other year the fellowship is awarded to 40 individuals for the purpose of funding getaways that would provide an opportunity for them recharge their creativity. From 1999 to 2023, the fellowship consistently provided $10,000 to its recipients until 2025 when the award amount was raised to $12,000.

Notable recipients

- Kaila Austin
- Rebecca Robinson
- Uranchimeg (Orna) Tsultem
- Kevin James Wilson

=== DeHaan Artists of Distinction ===
The DeHaan Artists of Distinction award program, administered by the Indy Arts Council, was brought into fruition in 2017 with the help of funds provided by businesswoman and philanthropist, Christel DeHaan. This award focuses on supporting contemporary artists and visual art projects with a $10,000 grant. As of February 2025, the program has supported 36 artists with more than $390,000. The recipient's finished projects get the opportunity to be exhibited in the council's Gallery 924.

Notable recipients

- Anila Quayyum Agha
- Aaron S. Coleman
- India Cruse-Griffin
- Samuel Levi Jones
- Jacinda Russell
- Artur Silva
- Tom Torluemke
- Beatriz Vasquez
- Shamira Wilson

== See also ==
- Indianapolis Cultural Districts
- The Cabaret
- Harrison Center
- Indy Art Center
