= Kevin James Wilson =

American Artist

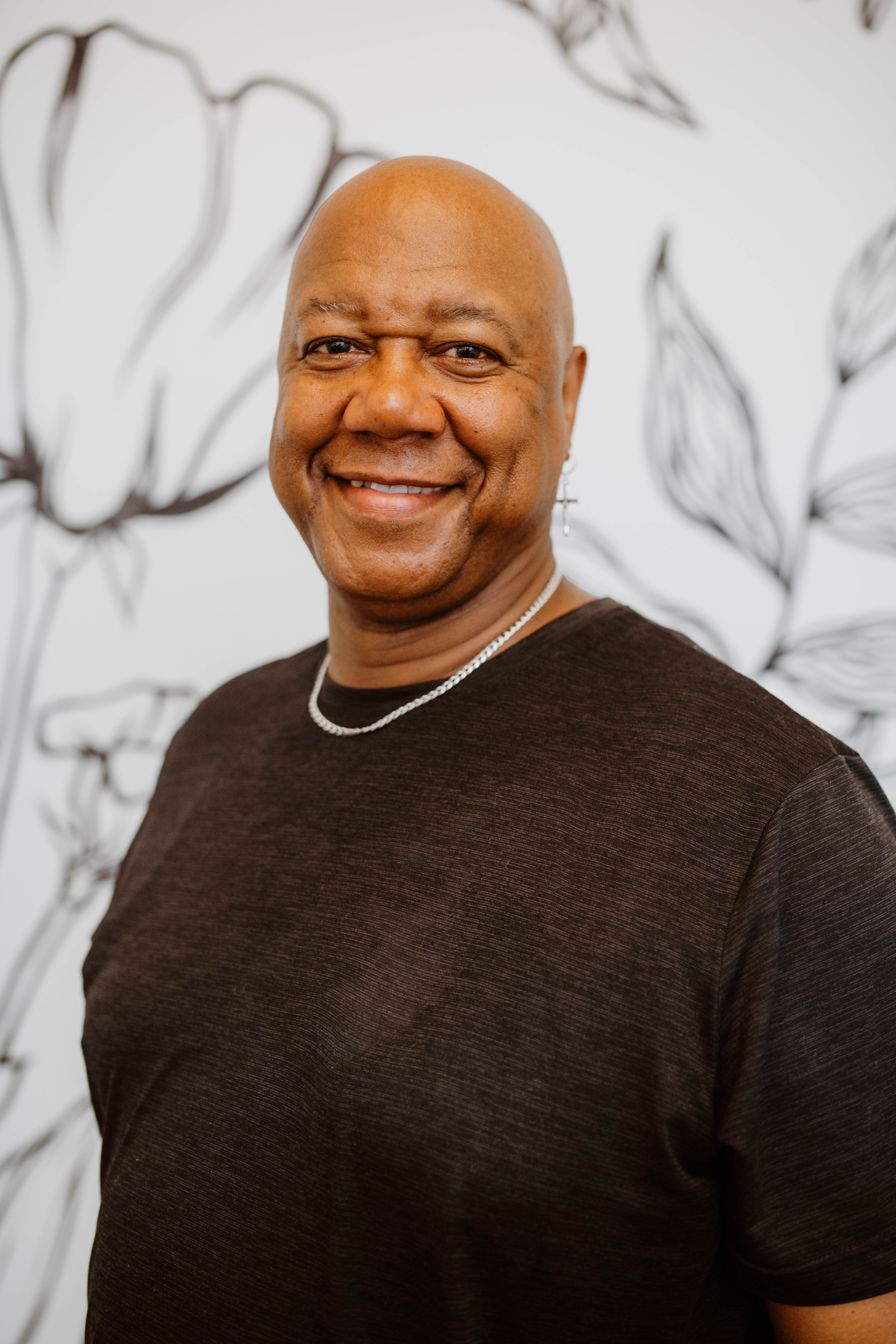
- Education: Bachelor of Fine Arts in Illustration
- Alma mater: Rhode Island School of Design
- Spouse: Susanne Wilson
- Website: https://kevinjwilson.net/

Kevin James Wilson is a 2D artist and art teacher based in Indiana where he has taught multiple forms of media to students at institutions such as the International Business College and the Indianapolis Arts Center. Wilson's work has been featured in the Indianapolis Museum of Art's (IMA) Alliance Rental Gallery, the Penrod Arts Fair at the IMA, the Hoosier Art Saloon at the Indiana State Museum, the Broad Ripple Art Fair, the Harrison Center, the Indianapolis Airport, and the Children's Museum of Indianapolis.

== Early life and education ==
The Indianapolis Recorder has reported that Wilson has been drawing since the age of five after finding inspiration in the realistic art of Norman Rockwell. He won multiple competitions with his art in his school days before graduating from Indianapolis's Crispus Attacks High School in 1977. Wilson was then given a full-ride scholarship to attend the Rhode Island School of Design where he obtained a Bachelor of Fine Arts in Illustration. While still attending university, Wilson was given the opportunity to draw and present a portrait of Muhammad Ali at the Cotten Club after a chance encounter with a New York diplomat on a plane ride.

== Career ==
After graduation, Wilson taught graphic design at International Business College in Indianapolis for 25 years and airbrush at the Indianapolis Art Center for 12 years.

In May 2022, Wilson's work was featured in the first annual Art of Speed exhibit alongside eight fellow artists in Indianapolis's Gallery Forty-two. The exhibition was made to celebrate the month of May and all the racing excitement that comes with it in Indiana leading up to the Indianapolis 500. The 2022 first annual Art of Speed exhibit was open from May 3 to June 6.

Wilson was highered on to his current position as the President of the Indiana Artist Club in 2022. He is the club's first president of color.

On July 7, 2023, Wilson had a gallery dedicated to his artwork open in the Harrison Center. This exhibit was titled "Anthology" and featured 2D artwork by Wilson spanning 40 years from his high school days to the present. The Harrison Center also selected Wilson to be a part of their ArtDish event in which they invite a local chef to curate a four-course meal based on a featured artist's work for guests to enjoy while also getting an opportunity to talk to the artist about their work. For Wilson's ArtDish Tawana Gulley, the executive chef of The AMP at 16 Tech's Healthy Soul restaurant, was chosen to be the head chef.

In 2024, Wilson was one of twenty-four local Hoosier artists selected by the Indy Arts Council to participate in their NBA All-Star 2024 "Hoosier Historia" project which was titled after the concept of "Hoosier Hysteria". The artists were each given a six-foot tall fiberglass basketball sculpture that had been brought in from Nebraska and told to paint them to tell a variety of historical Hoosier high school basketball stories. The twenty-four sculptures arrived in Indiana on Dember 27th, 2023, around two months before the All-Star game. On his basketball, Wilson depicted his alma mater's state championship win, honoring the Crispus Attucks High School boy's teams of 1955 and ’56. The sculptures were placed on display in downtown Indianapolis starting February 16, 2024.

From November 16–17, Wilson was a part of the Mélange Series at The Florence theater at The Academy of Gregory Hancock Dance Theatre in Carmel. This series brought together different types of performance and visual arts on the same stage and had them collaborate in front of an audience. In the show, Wilson created art in front of a live audience while sharing the spotlight with vocalist Tessa Gibbons and dancer Josie Moody.
