= Bloomingdale School =

Bloomingdale School may refer to:

- Bloomingdale School (Illinois), Bloomingdale, Illinois
- Bloomingdale School (Massachusetts), Worcester, Massachusetts
- Bloomingdale School of Music, New York, New York

== See also ==
- Bloomingdale School District, Bloomingdale, New Jersey
