= Black Lives Matter street mural (Indianapolis) =

Public artwork in Indianapolis, Indiana, US

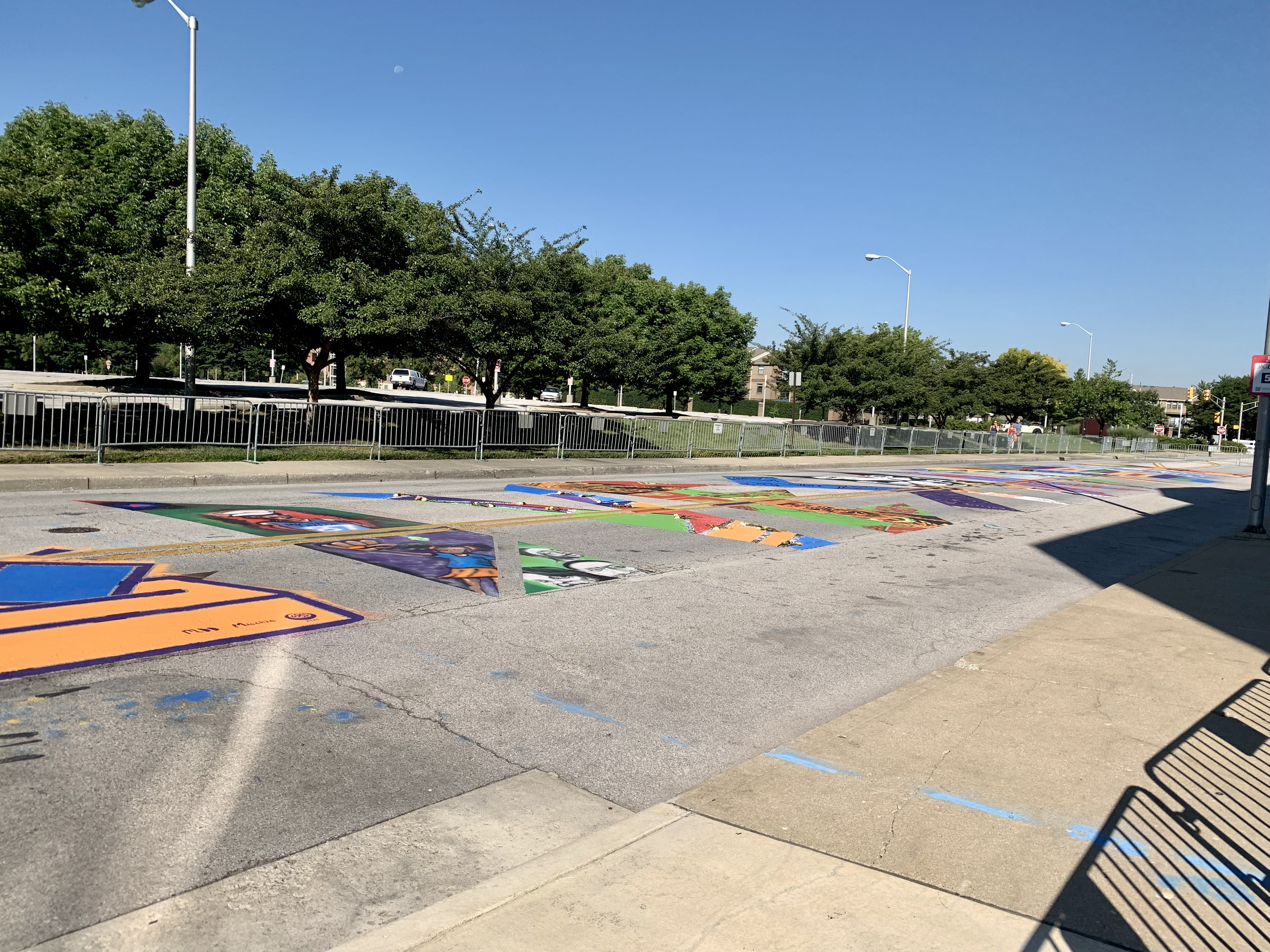
- Street-level view of the mural on August 8, 2020
- Year: 2020
- Location: Indianapolis, Indiana, U.S.; 39.7768°N 86.1688°W

The Black Lives Matter street mural in Indianapolis is a large, colorful mural reading "#BLACKLIVESMATTER", with a raised fist, that 18 artists painted across a downtown roadway in August 2020, as part of the George Floyd protests. The mural is located on Indiana Avenue, the historic hub of the city's Black culture, on the same corner as the Madam C. J. Walker Building.

18 individual local African American artists created the artwork, each artist responsible for one of the images in the message, and organized activists working with local Black Lives Matter groups. In contrast to several of the other Black Lives Matter street murals created around the same time, Indianapolis's is not painted in yellow road markings, but instead consists of many different contributions from artists painting in their own distinct style, which comes together as a single artwork.

== Design ==
Indiana Ave is a diagonal street, and the mural is oriented so that it reads left-to-right in the northwest direction. The mural is composed of 18 distinct pieces by different artists in their own style, but that all coalesce in a single work with common thematic elements, such as contrasting colors and geometric shapes. Beyond the Black Lives Matter mural, each of the artists work in different media or subject matter, and many of them do not specialize in street art at all. Artists sketched their work on the pavement using chalk and tape before applying paint, using both rollers and brushes.

The mural was created with contributions from 18 artists:

- B: Kyng Rhodes
- L: Rebecca Robinson (PSNOB)
- A: Amiah Mims
- C: Billy Hoodoo
- K: Kevin West
- L: John G. Moore
- I: Gary Gee
- V: Deonna Craig
- E: Rae Parker
- S: Ess McKee
- M: Wavy Blayne
- A: Harriet Watson
- T: Shane Young (FITZ)
- T: Israel Solomon
- E: Shamira Wilson
- R: Ashley Nora
- [Fist]: Kenneth Hordge (Fingercreations)

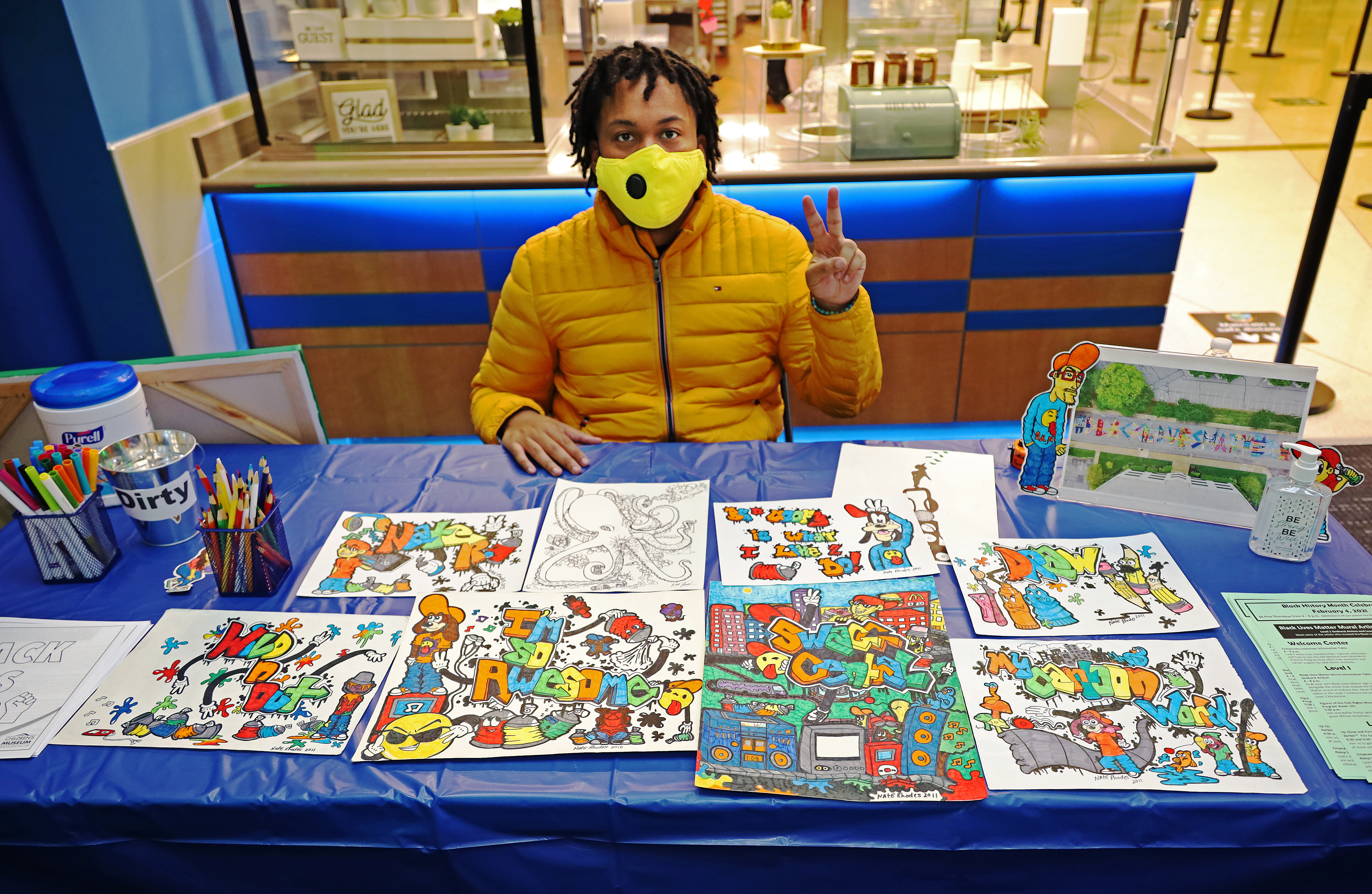
Kyng Rhodes ("B" artist) displays art during a 2021 Black History Month public program at The Children's Museum of Indianapolis.

Several of the pieces contain words and political messages, such as Kevin West's "K", which includes the name Michael Taylor, a Black teenager killed by Indianapolis police in 1987, who was also the artist's cousin. John G. Moore's "L" depicts the word "VOTE" written vertically, next to an image of a ballot and ballot box. Gary Gee's "I" contains an image of Taylor, whose death the artist stated was one of his earliest memories of police violence. Others were more abstract, focusing either on explicit symbols or using shape and color. Kenneth Hordge's raised fist is a scene of African symbolism, with a lion and acacia tree silhouetted in front of a setting sun, beneath the fist's fingers in Pan-African colors. Harriet Watson's "A", with drops of blood, is inspired by Faith Ringgold's The Flag is Bleeding.

== History ==
=== Indiana Ave ===
The downtown Indiana Ave. location selected for the street mural is symbolic of both Indianapolis's Black history and its legacy of White supremacy. The street, which runs in a northwest diagonal outward from the city center, began to be populated by Blacks as early as the 1860s. by the early 20th century, it was the clear center of Black culture in the city, with Black-owned business and Black churches dotting the area. Then, beginning in the 1950s, the city of Indianapolis undertook a campaign of uprooting Indiana Ave's Black populace in a forced redevelopment plan that Wildstyle Paschall of New America describes as "ethnic cleansing". Utilizing legal tactics, such as declaring areas blighted and invoking eminent domain, Indianapolis's White leadership took over and demolished swaths of the area in order to make way for the construction of the Indiana University–Purdue University Indianapolis campus, an Indiana University Health medical campus, the downtown section of Interstate 65, and increased parking. This history made the mural's placement a reference to the city's history of racial injustice.

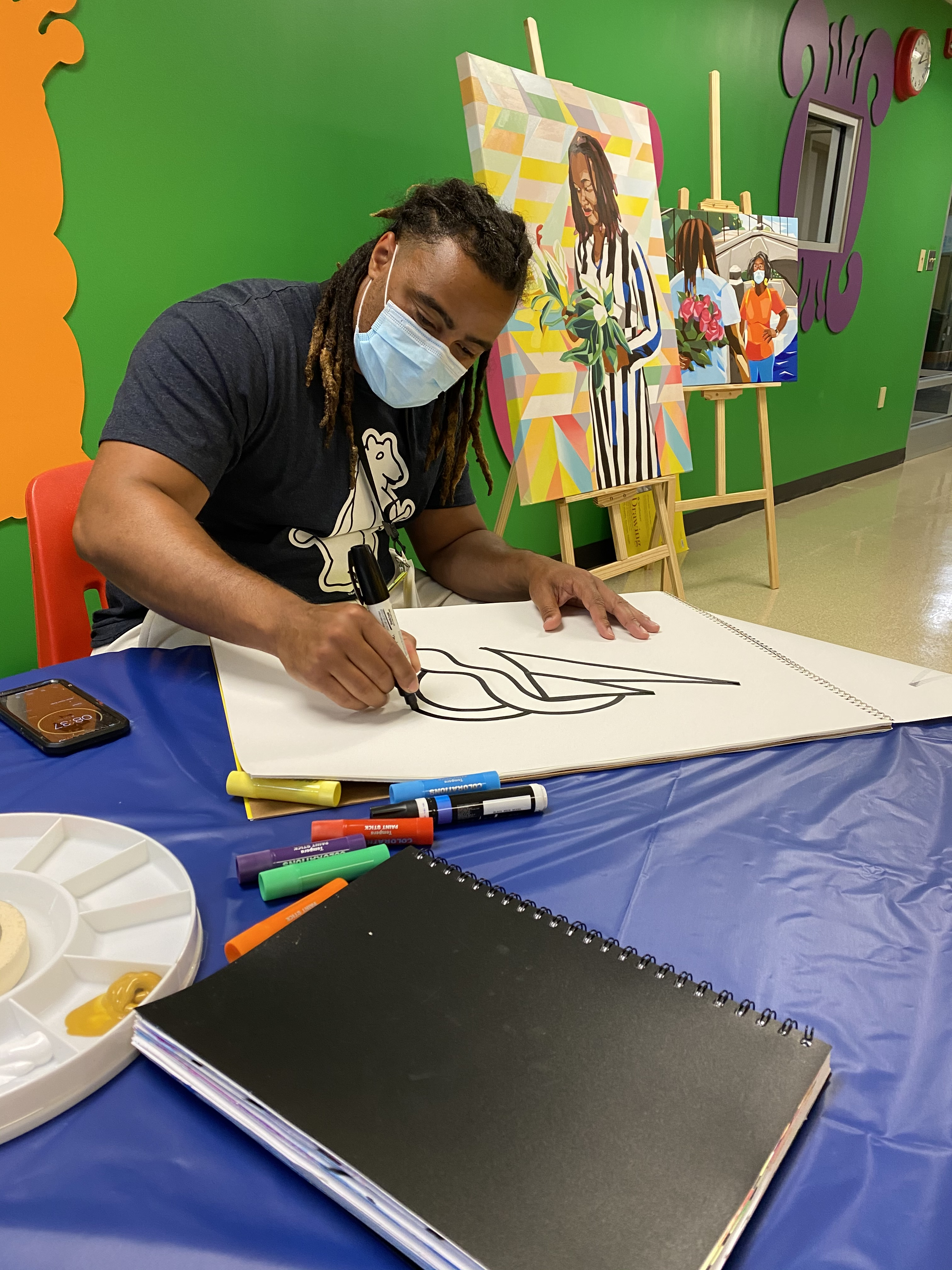
Israel Solomon (second "T" artist) displays art during a 2021 Black History Month public program at The Children's Museum of Indianapolis.

=== Creation ===
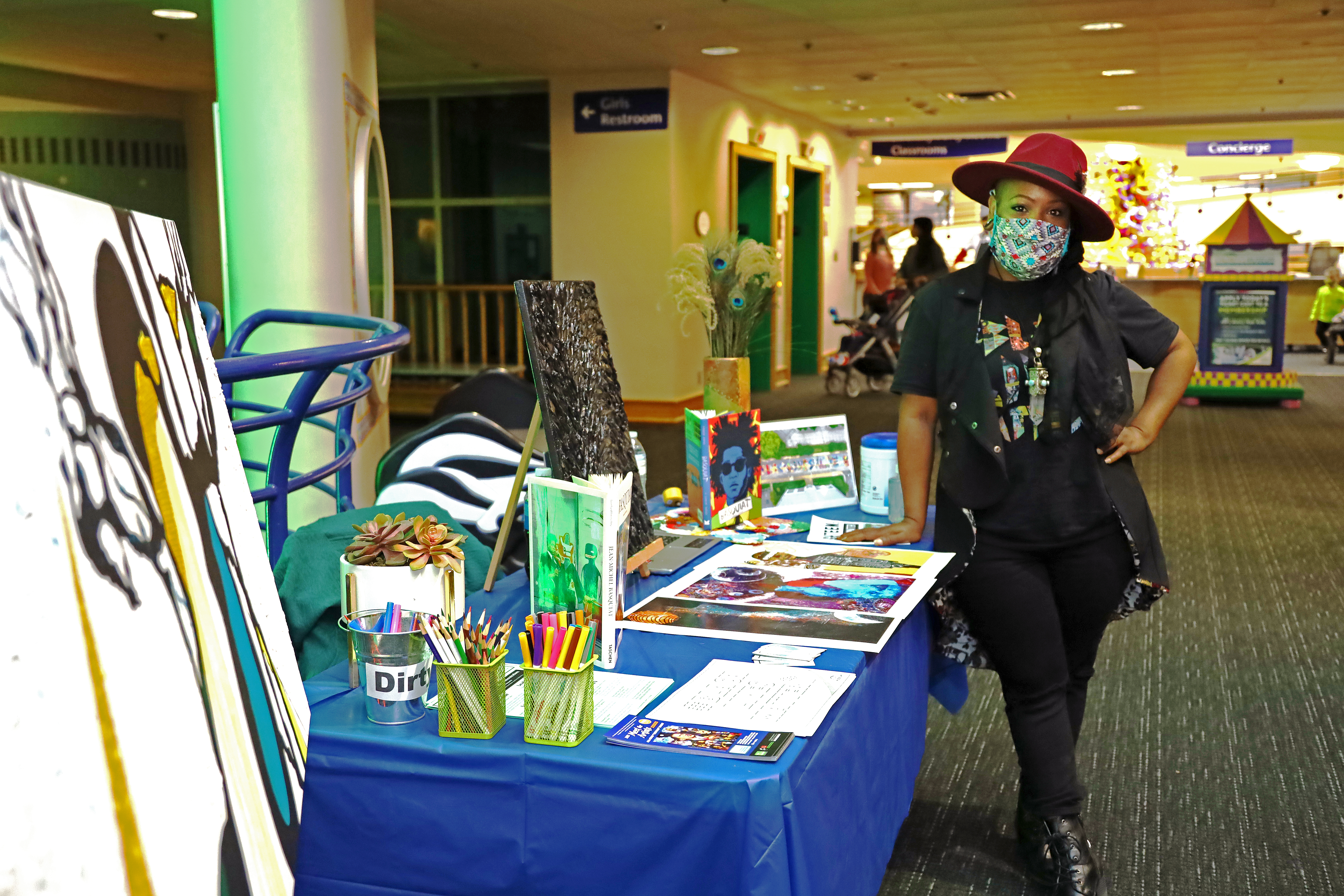
Deonna Craig ("V" artist) displays art during a 2021 Black History Month public program at The Children's Museum of Indianapolis.

On June 5, 2020, during the George Floyd protests, the city of Washington, D.C. painted the words "Black Lives Matter" near the White House, and, subsequently, similar messages were painted on streets in many cities, by activists or local governments. Around this time, Indy10, the local Black Lives Matter organizing group in Indianapolis, began planning for the possibility of a street mural in the city. On July 13, 2020, the Indianapolis City-County Council passed a resolution, with 21 of 25 councillors in favor—every Democrat supporting and every Republican opposing—directing the painting of "Black Lives Matter" on Indiana Ave, calling it "an anti-racist message". While the Indianapolis Department of Public Works was tasked with coordinating the painting, the effort was organized by Indy10, and funded with the support of local community organizations, including the Indianapolis Urban League and the Central Indiana Community Foundation. Artists were paid fees for their work by funding provided by Tamika Catchings, Naismith Memorial Basketball Hall of Fame player for the Indiana Fever. Soon after the council resolution, Indy10, working with local arts advocates Stacia Moon, Mali Jeffers and Alan Bacon, put out a call to the community seeking artists for the mural, as well as performers for the event when it would be painted.

The mural was painted beginning on the morning of Saturday, August 1, 2020. The weekend of the painting, Indiana Ave was closed, and community groups organized a public festival with speakers, music, and spoken word performances. There was also a reading of names of people who had been killed by police, and involvement from family and community members connected with them. Like the mural, the event was described as not just about police killings, but as reclaiming Indiana Ave for its community and celebrating Black joy. The event was mostly full of supporters, but there were a small number of counter protestors and security was present. Despite Saturday rain, the painting was completed on Sunday.

The block of Indiana Ave with the mural was first closed vehicular traffic through Monday, August 3, then extended to Thursday, August 6 to allow time for paint to dry. Eventually, the closure was extended to Labor Day to allow additional time for public viewing.

=== Vandalism ===
Overnight on the morning of Sunday, August 9, about one week after the mural was completed, it was defaced with white and gray paint splatter across the length of the mural. The Indianapolis Metropolitan Police Department stated that it was investigating the vandalism as a crime. Several of the mural's artists expressed their lack of surprise at the occurrence, and the group of artists and organizers released a statement that "the vandalism that occurred is a visual depiction of what hate looks like." Subsequently, the artists stated their intention to leave the vandalism in place, saying it was demonstrative of the racism the mural was seeking to address.
