= Indy Reads =

A language non profit based in Indianapolis

- Formation: 1984 in Indianapolis, Indiana
- Type: Non-Profit
- Location: 1066 Virginia Avenue, Indianapolis, IN 46203
- Chief Executive Officer: Ruba Marshood
- Parent organization: Indianapolis Public Library
- Budget: $1,256,418 USD
- Revenue: $1,398,861 USD
- Website: indyreads.org

Indy Reads is a literacy non-profit organization based in Indianapolis, Indiana, United States. It is a private non-profit organization that promotes literacy in Central Indiana. Indy Reads also runs a bookstore that provides revenue to the organization.

== History ==
Indy Reads began as an offshoot of the Indianapolis Public Library, and later became an independent non-profit. The organization was founded in 1984 as the Greater Indianapolis Literacy League by librarians and community activists.

In 1998, the nonprofit adopted the name "Indy Reads" after becoming a separate organization from the Public Library. The bookstore was opened downtown on Massachusetts Avenue in 2012. As well as hosting literacy events, it was the only bookstore in downtown Indianapolis when it opened.

During the COVID-19 pandemic, Indy Reads provided its services online, which improved the digital literacy skills of both students and staff. It closed its bookstore during this time, reopening in November 2021 at a new location, co-located with the Indy Reads offices.

== Description and governance ==
Indy Reads is located at 1066 Virginia Avenue, Indianapolis, on Fountain Square. Its CEO is Ruba Marshood. It has a board headed by Kim Compton as of September 2026.

Many volunteers help to run the organization and bookstore.

=== Mission and services ===
As of 2026, nearly 20% of adults in Indiana have a reading level "at or below a fifth-grade". Indy Reads' mission is to promote and improve the literacy of adults and families and make Indianapolis more literate. It is sponsored by the Central Indiana Community Foundation (CICF).

It provides programs for adults and families who struggle with literacy. They offer programs for students, adult learners, English language learning, High School Equivalency, and more. All of these classes are free and the teachers/tutors are volunteers. The organization has expanded its programs outside of Marion County, and there are now two satellite offices in Boone County and Hendricks County.

As of August 2026 the organization serves close to 500 adult students across central Indiana.

Indy Reads bookstore

=== Bookstore ===
Indy Reads bookstore, which opened in 2012, is an independent bookstore in downtown Indianapolis that serves as the revenue arm for Indy Reads. The bookstore hosts readings and workshops and other events, over 150 each year. The store also sells new and used books, purchased and donated.

== Funding ==
Indy Reads operates on a budget of $1,256,418, and its revenue is $1,398,861. Indy Reads is funded by donations and grants, including from the Central Indiana Community Foundation, as well as revenue from its bookstore. It has regular sponsors and partners, including major sponsors Electric Plus, the Lumina Foundation, Pulitzer Prize, Audiochuck, and Glick Philanthropies.

In 2024, Indy Reads ran a pilot class in association with industry partner Electric Plus. In November 2025, the Bank of America announced Indy Reads as one of two "Neighborhood Builder" honorees, who would be awarded a $200,000 grant over two years, along with comprehensive leadership training for the CEO and an emerging leader, as well as becoming a member of a national network of nonprofit peers.

In August 2026, Indy Reads received a grant of $150,000 from The MolinaCares Accord to launch a new program in health literacy, in partnership with Molina Healthcare.

== Events and activities ==
In March 2026, Indy Reads, in partnership with Indiana Sports Corp and the Children's Literacy Project, screened the film Sentenced, a documentary about literacy in the U.S. produced and narrated by NBA Champion Stephen Curry, in an exclusive premiere at the IMAX Theatre at the Indiana State Museum.

== Recognition ==
In July 2026, CEO Ruba Marshood Named Exceptional Nonprofit Executive of the Year, "an honor recognizing individuals who exemplify leadership within the nonprofit sector", at United Way of Central Indiana's annual celebration.

The work of Indy Reads is also recognized by the prestigious grants it has received, such as the Bank of America's "Neighborhood Builder" in 2025 and the 2026 Molina Healthcare grant.
