= Harriet Watson =

American Artist

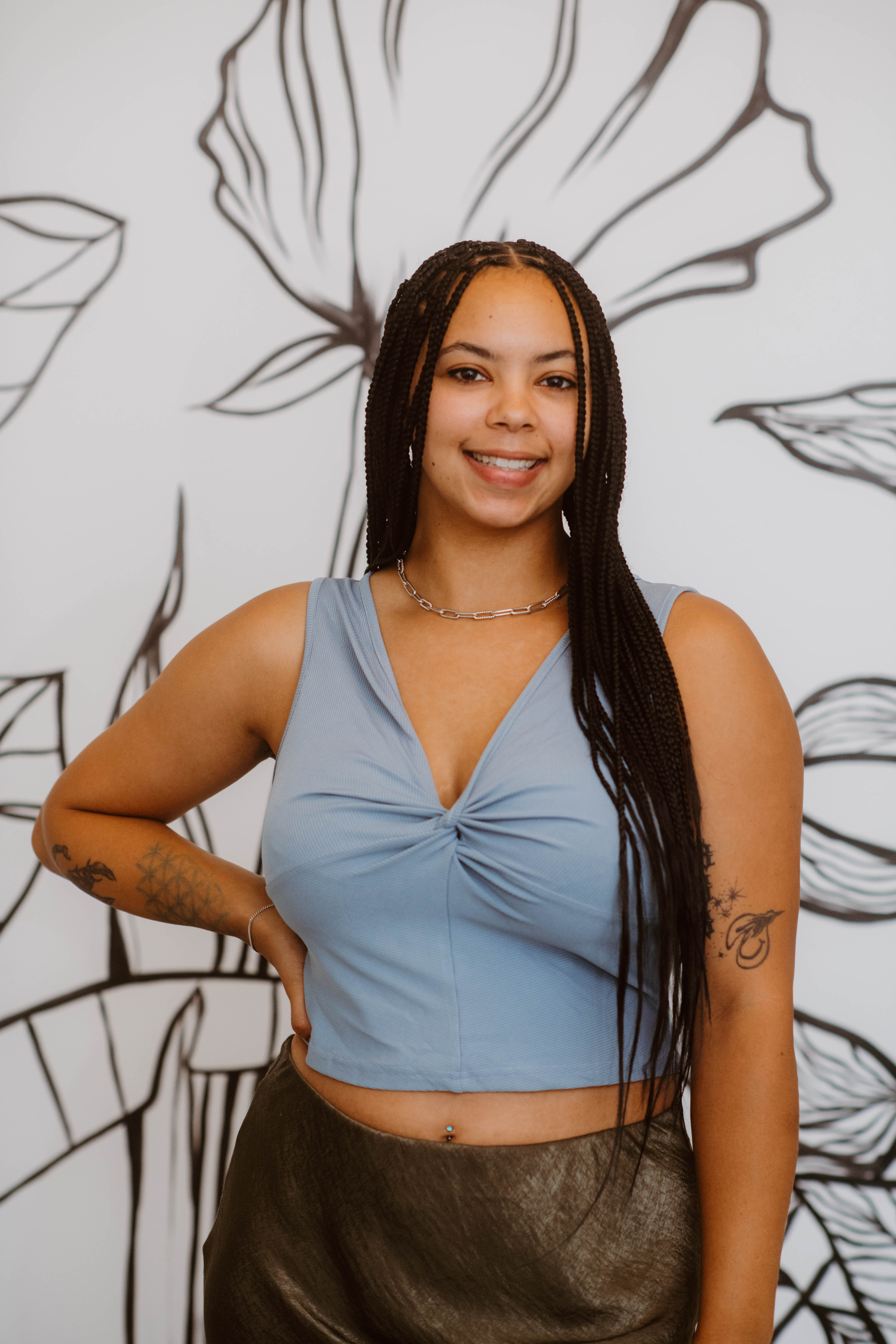
- Born: Indianapolis, Indiana
- Education: IU Bloomington
- Known for: Black Lives Matter street mural (Indiana Avenue)
- Website: https://harrietwatsonart.com/

Harriet Watson is an Indiana based artist who has predominantly worked in 2-D abstraction throughout her artistic career. She is a member of the Eighteen Art Collective, formed after a project in which eighteen Black artists collaborated to create the Black Lives Matter street mural on the historic Indiana Avenue. Watson's art is inspired by Black female artists from the 70's such as Faith Ringgold and Emma Amos. Watson owns her own business, Harriet Watson Art LLC, where she sells her art and clothing brand.

== Early life and education ==
Harriet Watson was born on December 25, 1994, in Indianapolis, Indiana. Watson, after being adopted as a newborn, was raised in Greencastle, Indiana. In this town, Watson went on to graduate from Greencastle High School before ultimately leaving to studying art and psychology in multiple universities including Ohio Wesleyan, Herron School of Art & Design, and IU Bloomington. Eventually, Watson graduated with a degree in psychology from IU Bloomington in 2020.

== Career ==
In August 2020, Harriet Watson joined seventeen fellow artists in creating the Black Lives Matter street mural on Indiana Avenue. For this project, Watson was assigned the letter 'A' in 'Matter'. Within the parameters of the letter Watson painted with blue and red patterns to represent the American flag, including red strips as a testament to the "hurt and pain" in America. The bottom half of the letter had the phrase "Know Justice, Know Peace" written out. This piece of the mural painted by Watson draws inspiration from Faith Ringgold's piece "Our Flag is Bleeding".

Putnam County selected Watson to participate in a mural festival in September 2022. For this project, six artists painted murals around the county in order to provide art to communities that are less likely to be exposed to public art. Watson painted her mural on a building in Roachdale Community Park hoping to provide a piece that would be a part of childhood play in the park. The festival went on from September 11 to September 24, 2022.

In June 2024, the Harrison Center hosted a month-long show of Watson's work in their Underground Gallery. The show was titled "Studio Notions" and was made up of a collection of Watson's pieces that showed a new and "experimental" artistic switch for her as she began to embrace abstract expressionism. The show highlighted the artist's interest in the use of miscellanies resources and unpredictability in art.
