= Kevin West =

Kevin West may refer to:

- Kevin West (military officer)
- Kevin West (politician)
- Kevin West (artist)
