= Rebecca Robinson (artist) =

Artist from Indianapolis, Indiana

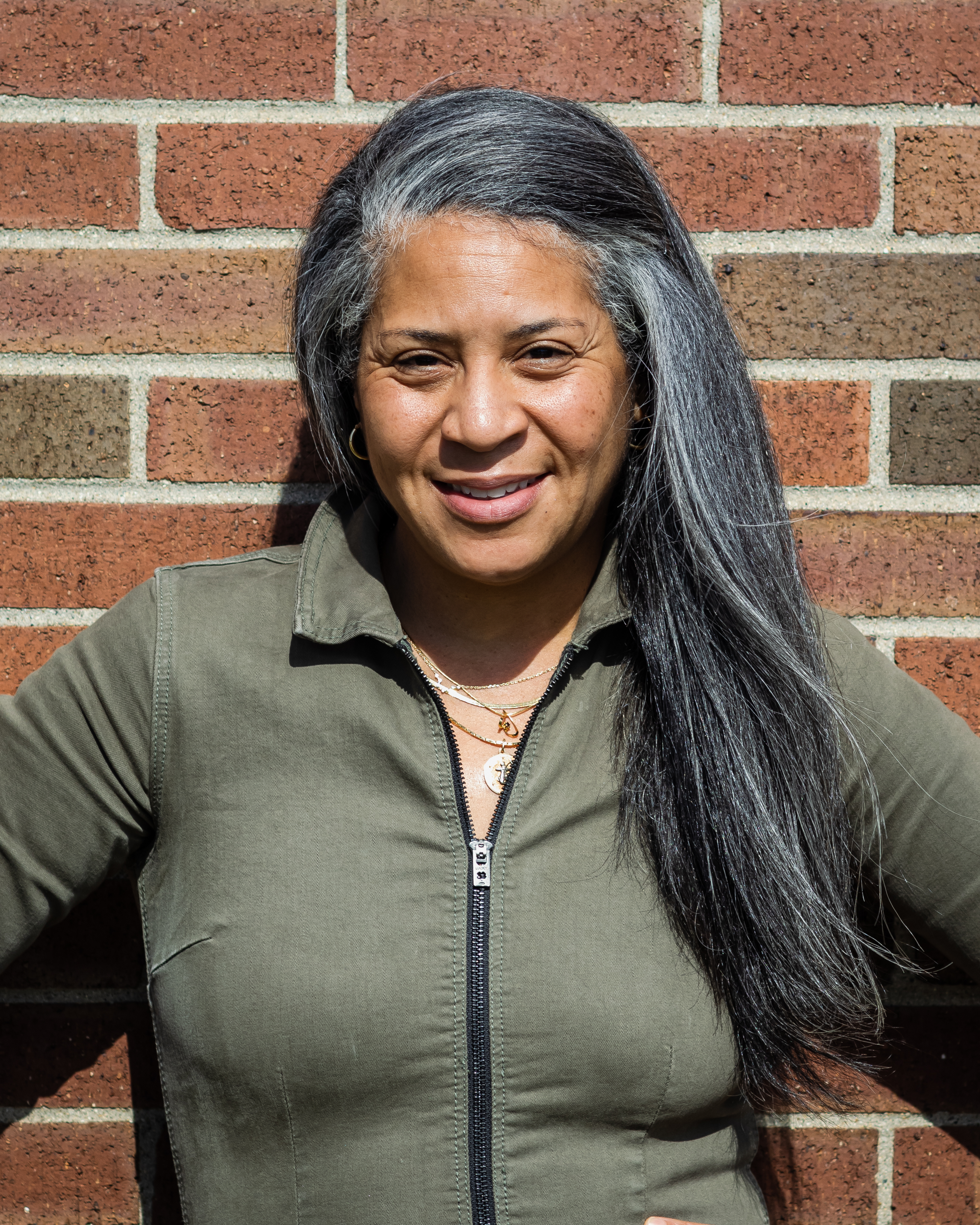
- Education: Art/Visual Communications
- Alma mater: North Carolina Central University

Rebecca Robinson, also known as PSNOB (pronounced "snob"), is a mixed media artist from Indianapolis, Indiana. Her work has been exhibited at the Chicago Museum of Science and History, Newfields, the Harrison Center, the Kurt Vonnegut Museum, and featured by the Arts Council of Indianapolis. She also designed custom cleats for the Indianapolis Colts. She is a member of the Eighteen Art Collective that created the Black Lives Matter street mural in Indianapolis.

== Life and education ==
Originally from Indianapolis, Robinson attended a Montessori school as a child. Robinson studied fashion and design in Atlanta, Georgia. She then graduated from with a degree Art/Visual Communications from North Carolina Central University.

== Work ==
Robinson's work includes approaches that focus on history, photography, film, graphic and fashion design. Subjects have included includes jazz musicians, people associated with the Madam Walker Legacy Center, and figures of other people. Her work has been exhibited or shown at the Chicago Museum of Science and History, Newfields, the Harrison Center, the Kurt Vonnegut Museum, the Indianapolis Public Library, Re:Public Art Gallery, and featured by the Arts Council of Indianapolis.

To make her work accessible to a broad audience, Robinson created a fashion line of custom designed handbags under the brand PSNOB (pronounced "snob"). PSNOB was created in 2001 while Robinson was living in Atlanta, Georgia. In 2021, Robinson expressed a desire to be known as more than PSNOB and to be recognized as an artist in other media as well.

In 2019, she created a nonprofit called ONE ARRT TM. The organization aims to offer art supplies for under-resourced communities.

Her murals have been displayed at Union Station and on the Indianapolis Cultural Trail. Her mural, entitled, "New Nation" features a kneeling figure silhouetted in black and holding a flag against a white background. Robinson's style includes the use of industrial materials commonly found at hardware stores.

In 2021, Robinson co-curated an exhibit of women artists of color at the Indianapolis Public Library. In that same year she was commissioned by the Indianapolis Colts to design custom football cleats. Robinson designed three pairs of shoes that were then auctioned after a game with the Texans.

Robinson has served as a member of the Kurt Vonnegut Museum Planning Committee, the Indianapolis Cabaret Board of Directors, The Indianapolis Black Documentary Film Festival Advisory Committee, and the Indianapolis Public Library's African American History Committee Advisory Board.
