= Ess McKee =

American artist

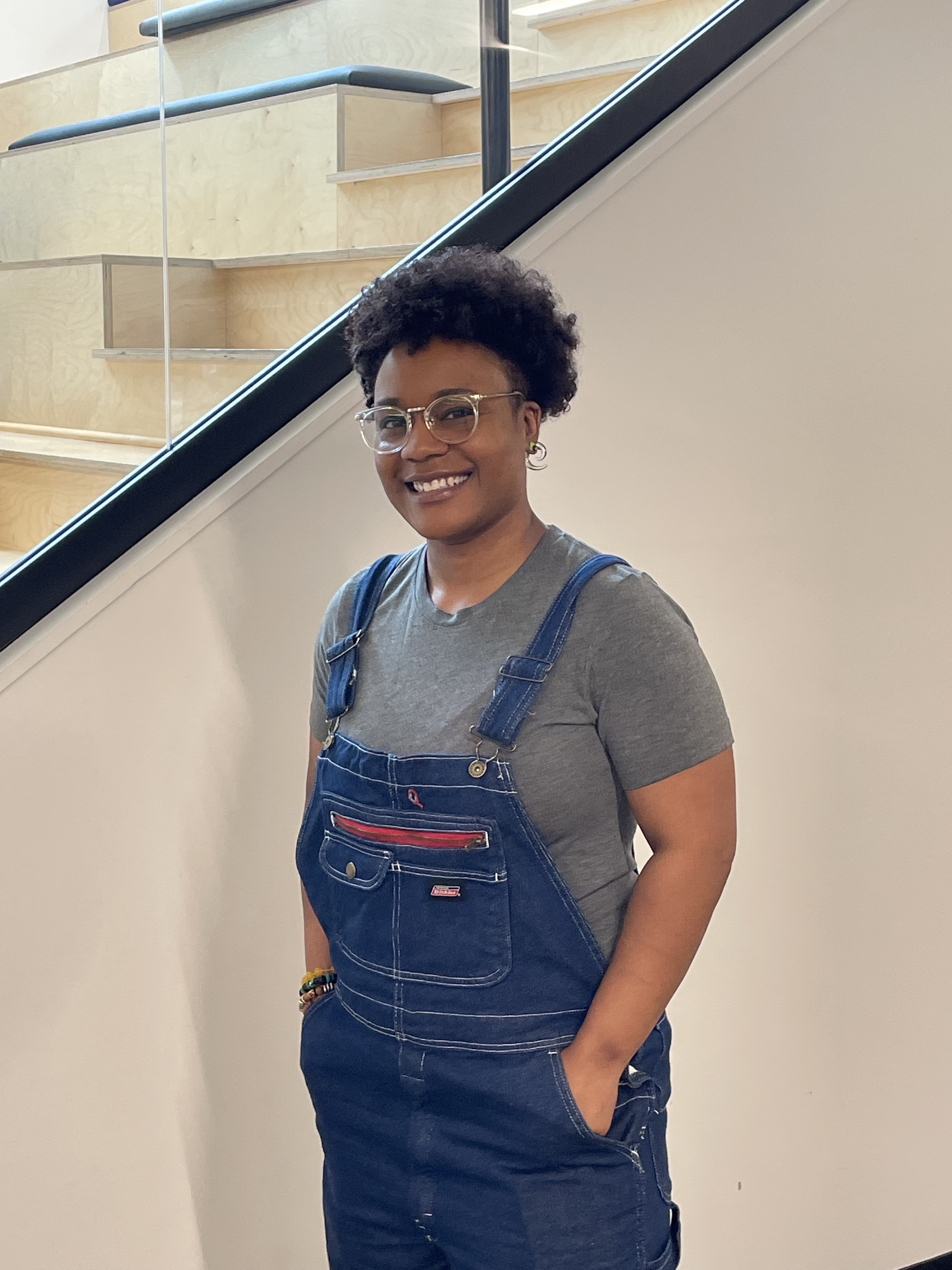
- Born: Sylvia Rivers; Arizona
- Known for: Multimedia; mural; installation art; contemporary art
- Notable work: Black Lives Matter street mural (Indianapolis)

Ess McKee is an American multimedia artist whose work has been featured in We.The Culture, an exhibit at Newfields Indianapolis Museum of Art. As an artist at the Harrison Center and a member of the Eighteen Art Collective in Indianapolis, McKee's work has focused on activism and education.

== Early life and education ==
Ess McKee (Sylvia Rivers) was born in Arizona. When she was in high school she decided to pursue a career in the arts. In an interview, McKee notes that her parents were in the military and for four years she lived in Germany. In Germany, McKee developed an interest in skateboarding and skate culture. While in high school in Arizona, McKee was a track and field athlete specializing in the triple jump. After high school, McKee entered college in Texas, but then moved to Indiana to study Graphic Design at Ball State University. McKee majored in Industry and Technology with a minor in Printmaking.

== Career ==
As a multimedia artist, McKee's work includes elements of graffiti, graphic art, typography, textiles, 3D design, and digital art. In addition to her work as an artist, McKee teaches art at the K-8 level and is a visiting instructor at the Herron School of Art and Design.

In 2018, McKee's work was exhibited at Nxght Vision Studios in Indianapolis, Indiana.

In 2020, McKee was appointed as the inaugural fellow at the 10 East Arts Hub, a program of the John H. Boner Neighborhood Centers. That same year, McKee worked with the Big Car Collaborative to produce a mural on a pump house near the Indiana Central Canal and Meridian Street, as part of the DigIndy Art Project. She also produced a mural, The Future is Now, as a participant in the Murals for Racial Justice project organized by GANGGANG and funded by the Indy Arts Council.

On August 1, 2020, McKee participated in creating the Black Lives Matter street mural in Indianapolis, Indiana. McKee created the letter 'S.' Following the creation of the work, the artists of the mural established and joined the Eighteen Collective.

McKee's work, The Beautiful, was shown at We. The Culture, an exhibit at Newfields in Indianapolis. The Beautiful was created in 2020 and is based on the flag of the United States. It is a companion to a piece that McKee created following the shooting of Philando Castile, Black America in Distress.

In 2021, the Indianapolis Art Center hosted EIGHTEEN: Black Lives Matter, an exhibit that included works by McKee.

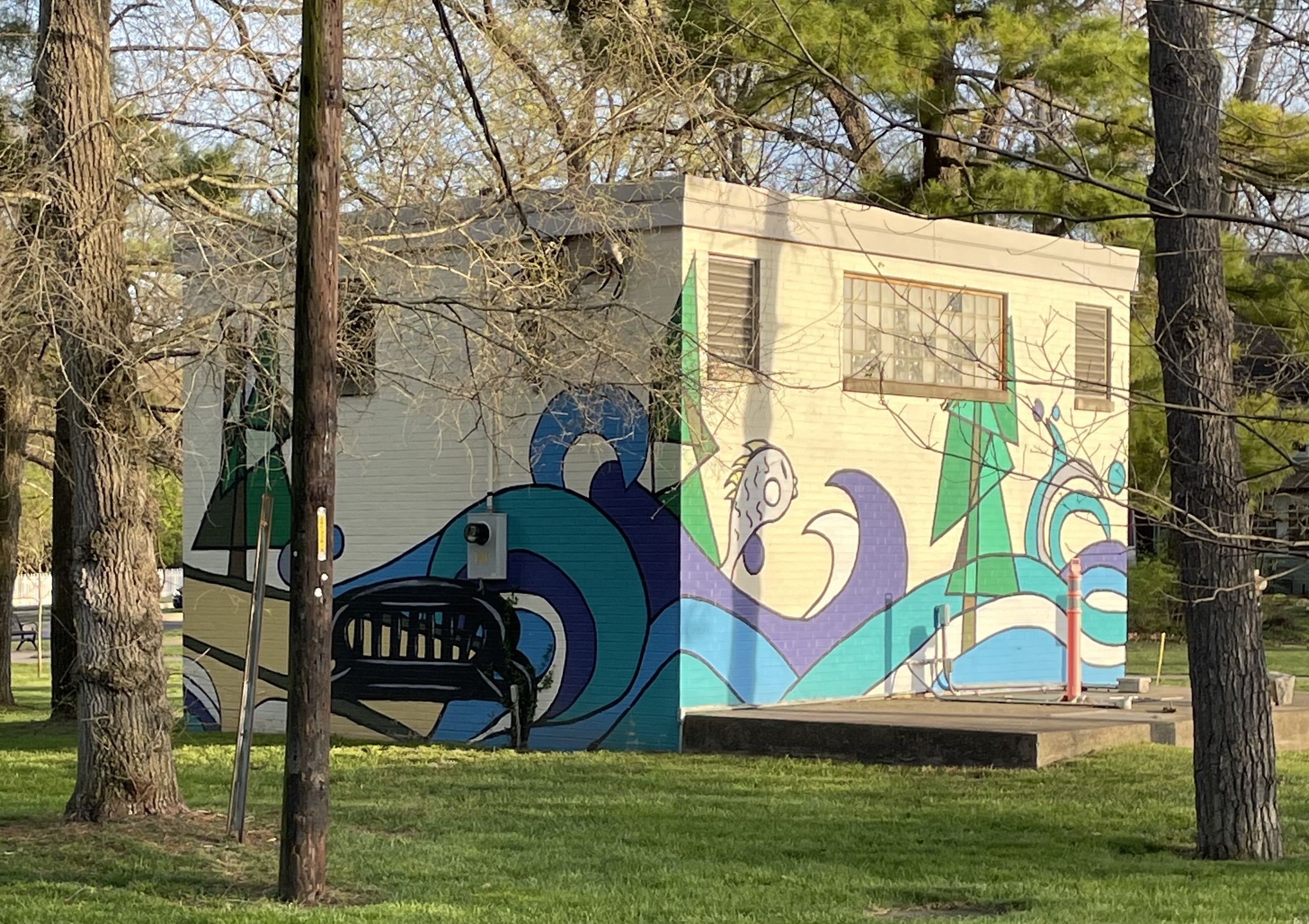
Portion of a mural by Ess McKee on the pump house in Alice Carter Place park in Indianapolis, Indiana.

In 2022, McKee's work was included in BUTTER, a fine arts fair for Black artists created by GANGGANG.

== Selected exhibitions ==
- Distress Signal. Harrison Center for the Arts. Indianapolis, Indiana. November 2020.
- Stories from Our Community: The Art of Protest. The Children's Museum of Indianapolis, Indianapolis, Indiana
- BUTTER 2. Indianapolis, Indiana, September 1–4, 2022.
- TINY XI: A Really Big Show. Gallery 924. Indianapolis, Indiana. December 2, 2022 – January 12, 2023.
- We. The Culture: Works by the Eighteen Art Collective. Newfields, Indianapolis, Indiana. September 23, 2022 – September 24, 2023.
