= Jacinda Russell =

American photographer

Jacinda Russell (born 1972) is an American photographer and installation artist. She is an Associate Professor of Art at Ball State University.

== Early life and education ==
Russell's family are from Southern California and she lived in Tucson, Arizona for six years as a teenager.

Russell earned an master's degree in fine art from the University of Arizona, and a bachelor's degree in fine art from Boise State University.

== Career ==
=== Employment ===
She is an Associate Professor of Art at Ball State University.

=== Exhibitions ===
Russell's work has been included in exhibitions at the Atlanta Contemporary Art Center, the Phoenix Art Museum, Texas Gallery, Houston Center for Photography, Eyebeam, and the Amundsen-Scott South Pole Station. She has also shown her work at DiverseWorks, and the Academy of Fine Art & Design in Wroclaw, Poland, and the Griffin Museum of Photography.

Her project, Metaphorical Antipodes: The Border Wall deals with cultural attitudes and disputes towards the U.S./Mexico border. Her photographic series, Nine Fake Cakes & Nine Bodies of Water was described as "heartrendingly gorgeous" in Art21 Magazine.

Russell frequently collaborates with other artists on various projects. She believes collaborations can deepen the interconnections between artists, and can open one up to new ways of doing and making.

=== Collections ===
Several works by Russell are held in the permanent collection of the Museum of Fine Arts Houston.

== Awards ==
Russell received a Photographic Arts Council-Los Angeles (PAC-LA) fellowship from the Center for Creative Photography (2017) to research the work of the American photographer, Robert Heinecken, resulting in her art piece, Robert Heinecken: Myth and Loss Reimagined, 2017 - 2019. In 2019, Russell received a DeHaan Artist of Distinction Award through the Arts Council of Indianapolis. In 2002 she received a fellowship from the Houston Center for Photography.
