= Nelly Vuksic =

- Born: Nelly Perez Trevisan; August 19, 1938 (age 88); Totoras, Santa Fe, Argentina
- Education: National University of Rosario; Ball State University
- Occupations: Musician, conductor
- Years active: 1972-present
- Spouse: Cesar Vuksic
- Children: Alejandro Vuksic
- Parents: Emilio Perez (father); Lydia Perez (nee Trevisan) (mother)
- Musical career
- Genres: Choir, Latin American music
- Occupations: Conductor, singer
- Instrument: Piano
- Formerly of: Americas Vocal Ensemble

Nelly Vuksic (born August 19, 1938) is an Argentinian conductor and singer. She has worked with a variety of groups in several styles, and has released albums with Americas Vocal Ensemble. Outside of performing and conducting, she has also taught music at several establishments such as the Bloomingdale School of Music, Friends Seminary and Columbia University.

== Early life ==
Nelly Perez Trevisan de Vuksic was born in Totoras, Santa Fe, Argentina, on August 19, 1938, to Emilio and Lydia Perez. Her family was well known in the town, as her grandmother was the first school teacher and her grandfather had owned the largest general store in the town. Her family were not well off, as while her father continued to run the store, it was no longer as profitable as it once was. Until Vuksic was eight, she studied in her grandmother's private school, only then moving into the public school system. Her family enjoyed music, and she would sing with them as well as at the Catholic Church she attended. At the Church, she was trained by the nuns how to harmonise in a group as well as singing in a Gregorian chant.

She also learned how to play the piano as a child, and performed in concerts at the El Circulo Theatre in the town. When she completed her primary education, her family could not afford to send her into secondary education as the school was in the neighbouring town. Instead, she focused on her music, later describing piano as "her job". She would eventually complete her secondary education in her early 20s after paying for it herself. At the same time as this, she started attending courses at the National University of Rosario, where she was encouraged to learn how to conduct, and was invited to be the conductor for the University's youth choir.

== Musical career ==
Vuksic began to concentrate on conducting over piano, and began to work with the University's adult choir as well. Shortly after graduating, she met and married Cesar Vuksic, a pianist. The ceremony was on February 14, 1969, in Totoras. Cesar wanted to leave Argentina, and in 1972, he was offered a scholarship to Ball State University in Muncie, Indiana. Nelly followed her husband a year later, along with their son, Alejandro. After arriving, she was also offered a scholarship at the school of music there. While studying music, she also learned to speak English. Nelly became the conductor of the University's women's chorus, and helped the concert choir. She graduated with her PhD in conducting in 1978, having been awarded the University's Music Concerto Award in both 1976 and 1977. Afterwards, she moved with her husband to Western Michigan University, where he was a visiting tutor. Vuksic taught piano, as well as conducted the University's choir and orchestras.

In 1979, Nelly left the United States when she was offered a role at the Conservatory of Tolima in Columbia. She later said that this was a turning point in her musical career, as she learnt about Latin American music. She became conductor of the group Los Coro de Tolimo, and won the Concurso Polifomico Internacional Award in 1980 with the group Coro Ibague. The couple moved once again in 1982, back to the United States where they lived in New York City. They had difficulty finding work, and Nelly took up work cleaning houses. After attending an Italian poetry reading, she offered to accompany a tenor on the piano and the duo began to play together in night clubs and restaurants.

Through a contact in the Americas Society, Nelly's details were passed to choral director Hugh Ross, who hired her as a singer. As a result, she founded a vocal group which later became Americas Vocal Ensemble. In 1982, the group recorded some works of Colombian composer Luis Antonio Escobar, who wrote a note for the cover of Las Cantatas Madrigales praising Nelly's interpretation. The group went on to release several further albums, including Opus One: Americas Vocal Ensemble Performs the Music of Joel Wallach, Music of the Americas and Hispanic Christmas Collection. As a result of this work, Nelly began to conduct other groups, including the United Nations Singers. Along with her work with the group, Nelly became a teacher at the Bloomingdale School of Music on the Upper West Side in 1982. She went on to work at the Friends Seminary between 1985 and 1990, and later at Columbia University. She has since become the Director of the Conservatory Chorale at the Brooklyn Conservatory of Music. In 1993, her biography was included in the book Notable Hispanic American Woman by Diane Telgen and Jim Kamp.
