= Deonna Craig =

American Artist

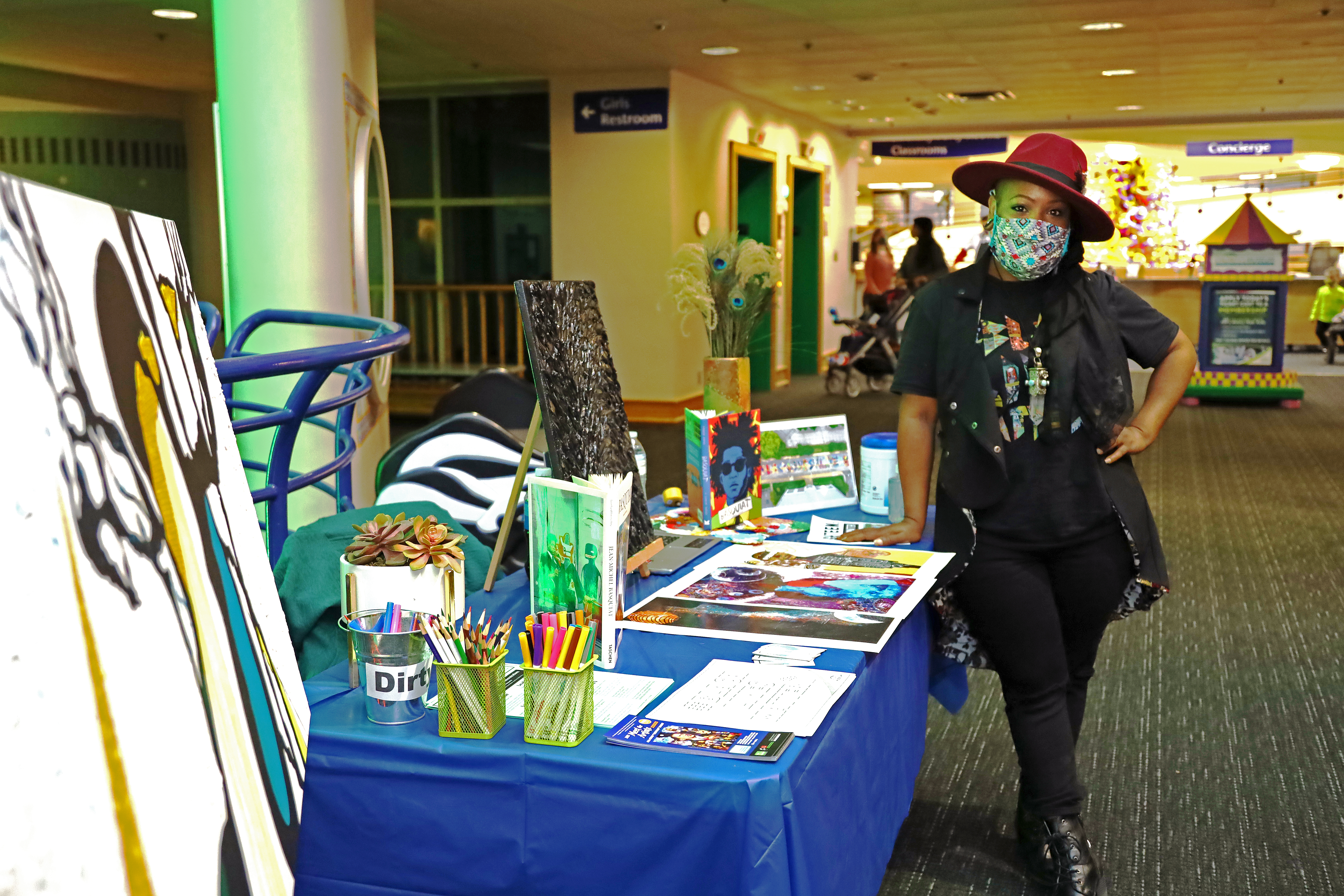
- Born: Indianapolis, Indiana
- Education: Cathedral High School and DePauw University
- Notable work: Black Lives Matter street mural
- Website: https://www.deonnacraigart.com/

Deonna Craig is an American abstract visual artist and art instructor who is based in Indianapolis, Indiana. She is primarily known for her contribution to the Black Lives Matter street mural on Indiana Avenue, created by the Eighteen Collective of which Craig is the president. The artist has had her work featured in numerous notable institutions such as the Indianapolis Museum of Art (Newfields), the Indianapolis Children's Museum, the Indiana State Museum, the Indianapolis International Airport, and the Indianapolis Art Center. Craig has also held the titles of Virtual Resident Artist at the Madam Walker Legacy Center from 2020 to 2021 and Visiting Artist at the Indianapolis Children's Museum from 2021 to 2022. Art by Deonna Craig is Craig's art company in which she sells many of her original abstract paintings and prints. Her work as an artist has largely been focused on community building in the Indianapolis area and historical art's influences on present-day culture.

== Career ==
Before deciding upon an artistic career path, Craig attended DePauw University where she graduated in 2004 with a degree in Communication and Sociology. Planning to have a career in either journalism or television, Craig jumped into working as a Production Assistant for the Jerry Springer Show right out of college. After leaving the Jerry Springer Show, Craig dove into the field of insurance, working as a fraud investigator. For fifteen years she stayed in this line of work, during which she was invited by her mom to a wine and canvas activity in order to "blow off steam." Though Craig had never pick up a paint brush prior to this activity, the instructor encouraged her to pursue the arts. Craig followed the instructor's advice, buying painting supplies the next day and creating her very first original painting for which she found encouragement for online in the form of buyers. In the beginning, Craig attempted to balance both her day job in insurance and her passion for art until her work became a hindrance to the future of her artistic career. In 2018, the up incoming artist was offered the chance to participate in the NBA All-Star weekend in Los Angeles, however, her insurance job would have denied her the opportunity, leading to Craig making the choice to walk away from Cooperate America in order to become a full-time artist.

In 2020, Craig's artistic inspiration pivoted to being centered around social justice and community building due to the public discourse going on at the time. That summer Deonna Craig and seventeen other artists got together to create the Black Lives Matter mural on Indiana Avenue, in which Craig was designated to depict the letter "V". For her letter, Craig mapped a bird's eye view of Indianapolis, writing out the names of local Black people who had been killed by IMPD. She placed these names on the roads of the map in order to highlight how these people were members of the community that the viewer could have easily passed on the street. The Eighteen artists who created this mural later became established as the Eighteen Art Collective in July 2021, electing Craig as their first president. Craig has had many of her pieces featured in galleries alongside the Collective, including in the exhibit "365+" presented by the Indianapolis Art Center, the "We. The Culture" exhibit at Newfields, and "The Art of Protest" exhibit at The Children's Museum of Indianapolis.

On October 31 of 2020, Craig was a part of another collaborative community project, "Reclaiming the Space," for which the Indianapolis City Market highered on seventeen visual artists to paint construction barricades put up on Market Street. This project was meant to bring in positive attention and encouragement for the community to return to the once bustling market following a loss of activity during the COVID-19 pandemic. Community continued to be the focus of Craig's work as she participated in projects such as the "Pay Attention" street mural in August 2022. For this mural the artist and the local neighborhood painted a design drawn out by Craig at the corner of East 16th Street and Graham Avenue in order to help slow down speeding cars in the area.

In October 2022, Deonna Craig had a solo exhibit presented by the Madam Walker Legacy Center entitled "COMPENDIUM". "COMPENDIUM" was a collection of paintings by Craig that were inspired by ancient art and put together in a gallery for the purpose of bringing attention to the past's effects on modern people and concepts. Craig has described the gallery as beginning with pieces that are more basic in nature, featuring images representative of ancient art. As the viewer walks through "COMPENDIUM" the colors become more potent ultimately building up to the last painting in the exhibit., "ANCESTOR SIMULATION," that depicts a woman standing in front of a portal. The audience is meant to question whether this woman has traveled from the past or future, creating an ambiguity that Craig put in place to encourage further exploration of the gallery.

"Existence (Coordinate of Life)" was the painting that Craig selected to be a part of Newfield's year-long "We. The Culture". This exhibit was up from 2022 to 2023, show casing original pieces by each of the Eighteen Collective in one gallery. Craig has described "Existence (Coordinate of Life)" as her attempt at making a connection between the past and the present art worlds. With this piece she hoped to encourage audiences to think about art as a lens with which they are able to understand ancient and present-day artists alike. During the year in which "We. The Culture" was up at Newfields, Craig traveled to several different locations as a recipient of the Creative Renewal Arts Fellowship from the Indy Arts Council, giving her the opportunity to study ancient petroglyphs. Through these travels Craig also planned to learn from those who are "keepers of culture" in their own communities, aiming to take that knowledge and reflect it back in Indiana.

In 2024 Craig worked as the director of the BUTTER Fine Arts Fair and helped curate BUTTER at Indy's home court, a pop-up exhibit that displayed basketball themed artwork set up at the Indianapolis Artsgarden for NBA All-Star weekend 2024 in Indianapolis. Craig continued her work as the director of BUTTER during the 2024 annual BUTTER Fine Arts Fair, working towards bringing attention to Indianapolis artists on a national scale.
