= Gary Gee =

American artist

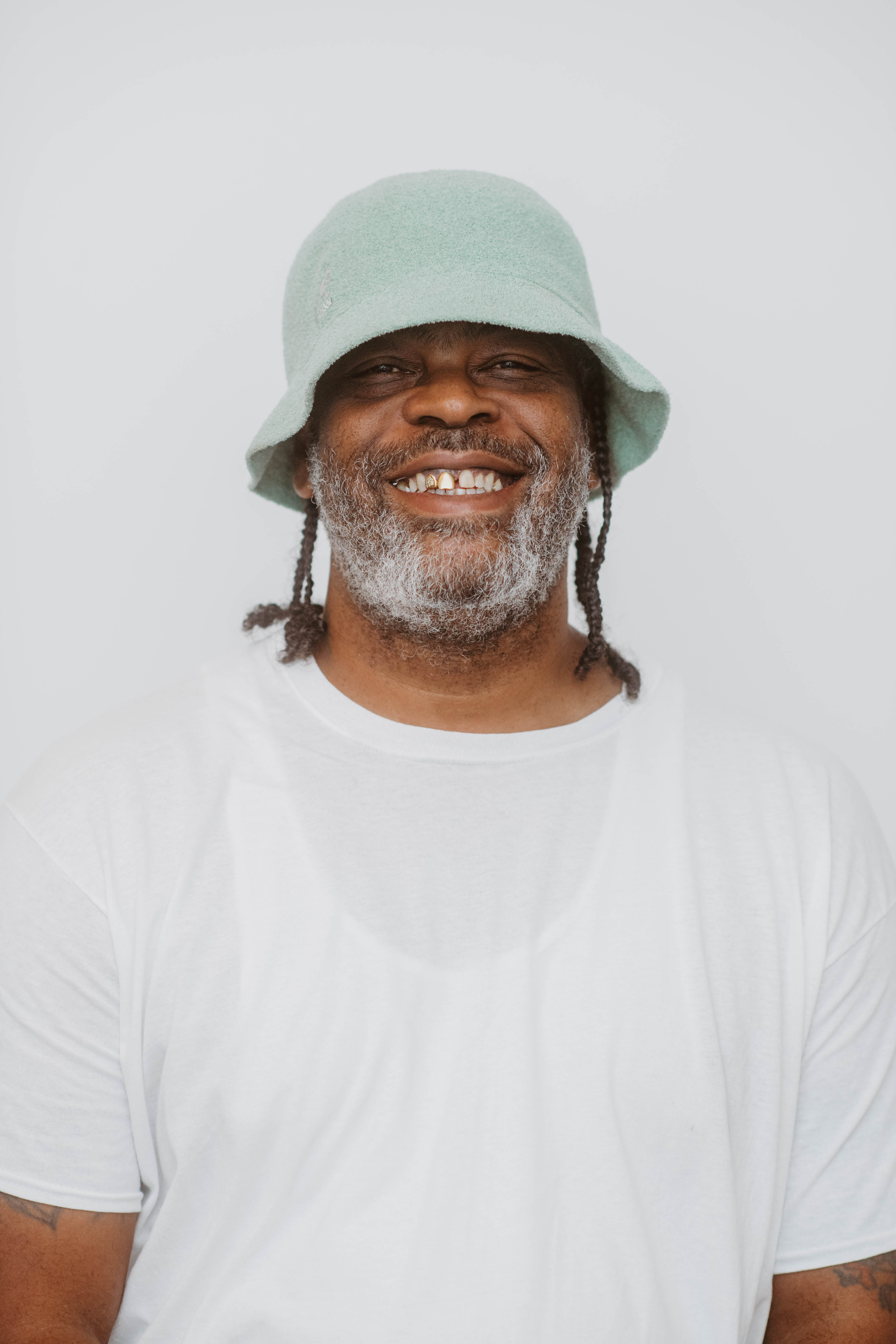
- Born: June 1971 (age 55)
- Education: Herron School of Art and Design, Ivy Tech
- Occupations: Fine artist, muralist
- Organization: GANGGANG

Gary Gee is an artist based in Indianapolis, Indiana. Gee is a member of the Eighteen Collective which is known for painting the Black Lives Matter street mural (Indianapolis). Gee's work has been featured in exhibitions and installations at BUTTER art fair, Indianapolis Public Library, Indiana State Museum, and Indianapolis Museum of Art. He also conducts community art sessions that encourage Indianapolis residents to participate in art making for the public.

== Early life and education ==
Gee was born in Indianapolis, Indiana in June, 1971. He went to Arlington High School (Indiana) and received multiple scholarships to study at Herron during his time there, but dropped out before completing. He received two degrees from Ivy Tech in visual communication and fine arts and a BA from Herron School of Art and Design. Gee also has an overturned drug conviction which caused him to serve 3 1/2 years in prison.

== Career ==
Gary Gee was the 2019 recipient of the Robert D. Beckmann, Jr. Emerging Artist Fellowship Program. He coordinated an exhibit in the Indianapolis Public Library called "Hip Hop Anthology, Vol. 1" in 2020, which featured 19 artists while focusing on the culture and music of Hip hop. Gee personally showcased two pieces, "Around the Way Girl" and "City On My Mind."

In 2021, Gee showed two pieces, “8:46” and “We the People…”, which hosted at the Indiana State Museum's exhibition "RESPONSE: Images and Sounds of a Movement.” "We the People…" features an unfinished quote from the United States Declaration of Independence, with a group of marching people of different races underneath. "8:46" depicts a portrait of George Floyd in a crown. The title number references the amount of time Derek Chauvin kneeled on Floyd's back, ultimately murdering him.

Gee also exhibited at the Hillside Art Center in Indiana with “Ground Breaking / Breaking Ground" in October 2022. He exhibited his pieces at BUTTER art fair in 2023 with his piece “Oops Upside Your Head!”

He conducted the PreEnact Community Mural in Indianapolis where he invited community members to depict their hopes and dreams for their future within Indianapolis. He also has a mural at the Art Walk at Clay Terrace in Carmel, Indiana called "High Fashion."
