= Uranchimeg (Orna) Tsultem =

Art historian from Mongolia

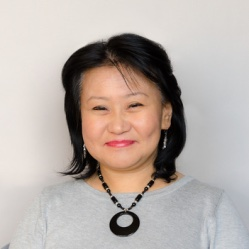
- Occupation: Art Historian

Academic background
- Education: Berkeley University of California

Academic work
- Discipline: Art History, Buddhist Art, Mongolian Art, Contemporary Art

Uranchimeg (Orna) Tsultem is a scholar of the art and culture of Mongolia. She has served as a curator of Mongolian art at the international level since 1997. Her curated exhibits have been shown at Kasumi Tsukuba Center in Tsukuba, Japan, Frauen Museum in Bonn, Germany, E&J Frankel Gallery in New York City, Worth Ryder Gallery and Institute of East Asian Studies at University of California Berkeley, Venice Beinnale, Shanghai Beinnale, the Modern Art Gallery in Ulaanbaatar, and the Sapar Contemporary in New York City. Uranchimeg is the author four books on Mongolia and is the recipient of the Fulbright Fellowship (2002–2005), John W. Kluge Fellowship (2013), the American Council of Learned Societies/Robert Ho Foundation Collaborative Research Award (2014–2016), and the Indiana University Presidential Arts and Humanities Fellowship in 2022.

== Education and background ==
Uranchimeg Tsultem credits her father, Nyam-Osoryn Tsultem (1923–2001)—an artist, a scholar, and a founder of the Fine Arts Zanabazar Museum (1996)—for contributing to her interests in Buddhist and Mongolian modern art.

Uranchimeg studied art history at Eotvos Lorand University of Budapest before receiving undergraduate (1993) and graduate degrees (1995) in Art History from the Mongolian National University of Arts and Culture. She received a PhD in Art History with a focus on East Asian and Himalayan art history from University of California Berkeley in 2009.

== Career ==
While completing her dissertation at Berkeley, Uranchimeg was a regular contributor to a lecture series on Himalayan and Mongolian art—including lectures at the Asian Art Museum in San Francisco, the Rubin Museum of Art, and at Princeton University. Her career as an educator began at the Mongolian National University of Arts and Culture (1995–2002). She has also held research and teaching positions at Yonsei University in South Korea, National University of Mongolia, the University of Iceland, the University of California Berkeley, and Indiana University.

Uranchimeg is credited for introducing curatorial practice in Mongolia during the mid-1990s. Following her first exhibitions, in foreign diplomatic missions and Western embassies in Ulaanbaatar (1993–1995), she curated an international exhibition that featured fifteen contemporary Mongolian artists in 1997 at the Kasumi Research and Training Center in Tsukaba, Japan. From 1999 to 2008, Uranchimeg curated the first corporate collection at Khan Bank of Mongolia; the gallery opened its doors to the public during her tenure. She also curated the first Mongolian contemporary art exhibition in the United States in 2000, Colors From Mongolia. This exhibition was organized by the International Cultural Exchange Society and featured 20 artists at E&J Frankel Gallery in New York City. The exhibit also traveled to SomArts Cultural Center in San Francisco. In 2011, Uranchimeg curated Modern Mongolia: From Steppe to Urban Dynamics, an exhibition of more than twenty, contemporary Mongolian artists at Hanart TZ Gallery in Hong Kong.

In 2013, Uranchimeg was selected by the U.S. Library of Congress Kluge Center to receive a fellowship focused on early 20th century Western explorers in Mongolia and Mongolian foreign policy. She delivered an address on the topic later that year that was prefaced by remarks from the Excellency Altangerel, the Ambassador from the Republic of Mongolia to the United States. The Ambassador noted that the presentation covered a "very important part of Mongolian-US relations" and observed that it was the first time that Mongolia was the topic of a lecture at the Library of Congress.

While at Berkeley, in 2015, Uranchimeg co-chaired and contributed to the development of the Mongolia Initiative program, with support from the U.S Department of Education and the Mongolian government. In that same year, she curated Mongolia's "first appearance" at the Venice Biennale, an international exhibition of contemporary art. In recognition of her work to establish the Mongolia Initiative, Uranchimeg received a certificate a Cultural Envoy of Mongolia in 2017.

In 2019, Uranchimeg was appointed to an endowed position at the Indiana University Herron School of Art and Design, the Edgar and Dorothy Fehnel Chair in International Studies.

In 2020, Uranchimeg's most recent monograph, A Monastery on the Move: Art and Politics in Later Buddhist Mongolia, was published by the University of Hawaii Press. Uranchimeg was interviewed about A Monastery on the Move on New Books Network in 2021. The book won the Art Book Prize awarded by International Convention of Asia Scholars, Leiden, the Netherlands, in 2023.

In 2022, Uranchimeg received the Indiana University Presidential Arts and Humanities Fellowship. Her plans for the award included the completion of a book on contemporary Mongolian art.

The exhibition Mongol Zurag: The Art of Resistance, which Uranchimeg curated in collaboration with the Mongol Zurag Society, showed at the Garibaldi Gallery in Venice, Italy from April 20-November 2024. The exhibition featured work by Nyam-Osoryn Tsultem, Baasanjav Choijiljav, Baatarzorgi Batjargal, and Urjinkhand Onon.

In November 2024, Uranchimeg received the Indy Arts Council's Creative Renewal Arts Fellowship.

== Books and special issues ==
- A monastery on the move: art and politics in later Buddhist Mongolia. University of Hawaii Press, 2021. ISBN 978-0-8248-8570-0
- Buddhist Art of Mongolia: Cross-Cultural Connections, Discoveries and Interpretations. Special Issue of Cross-Currents, vol. 8, n. 2: 11/2019. ISSN 2158-9666
- Primary documents of Mongolian art associations. BCI Publishing, 2018. ISBN 978-99978-3-312-9
- Монголын дүрслэх урлаг судлалын түүвэр нийтлэлүүд: 1993–2018. Admon Print, 2018. ISBN 978-99978-3-242-9
- Монголын Их Хүрээ хийдийн Буддын шашны урла. BCI Publishing, 2016. ISBN 978-99973-63-79-4

== Selected chapters, articles, and museum essays ==
- "'Capitalist Art' and the Invention of Tradition in Twentieth-Century Mongolia." Socialist and Post–Socialist Mongolia, Routledge, 2021.
- "Contemporary Art of Mongolia in the Era of Globalisation." Asia Pacific Art Papers (QAGOMA), 25 Nov. 2021.
- "Bayart-Od's Rich Mongolia: New Appropriation of Tradition in Mongolia." UNESCO Art Collection: Selected Works, edited by UNESCO, UNESCO Publishing, 2021, pp. 116–17.
- "The Internal Regulations of Gandan Monastery." Sources of Mongolian Buddhism, edited by Vesna A. Wallace, Oxford University Press, 2020, pp. 436–50.
- "Tsherin Sherpa: Meditation on Art and Life as Metamorphosis" in Metamorphosis: Recent Painting and Sculpture by Tsherin Sherpa. Herron School of Art and Design, Indianapolis, Indiana, 2020.
- "Mugi's Self-Portrait and Maternal Bodies in Post-Socialist Mongolia." Third Text, vol. 33, no. 1, Jan. 2019, pp. 79–104.
- "Carving and Sculpture in Mongolia." Encyclopedia of East Asian Design, edited by Haruhiko Fujita and Christine Guth, vol. 2, Bloomsbury Academic, 2019, pp. 488–91.
- "A Case of Allegoresis: A Buddhist Artist and His Patron in Mongolia." Artibus Asiae, vol. 78, no. 1, 2018, pp. 61–94.
- "Political Ecology in Baatarzorig's Art: Mongolia Is in Business." Five Heads (Tavan Tolgoi): Art, Anthropology and Mongol Futurism, edited by Hermione Spriggs, Sternberg Press, 2018, pp. 105–19.
- "Nomin Bold." Documenta 14: Daybook, edited by Quinn Latimer and Adam Szymczyk, Prestel Verlag, 2017.
- "Zanabazar (1635-1723): Vajrayāna Art and the State in Medieval Mongolia." Buddhism in Mongolian History, Culture, and Society, edited by Vesna A. Wallace, Oxford University Press, 2015, pp. 116–36.
- "Women Artists of Mongolia" in Raiji Kuroda ed., Women Artists of Asia (Fukuoka: Fukuoka Asian Art Museum, Japan, 2012), pp. 208–215.
- "Modernity and Tradition in Mongolian Contemporary Art" in Annu Willenius ed., Bare House: Pori, Rotterdam, Ulaanbaatar. Aalto University Publication Series. 2011.
- "Zanabazar's Art: The Building of Buddhist State in late Medieval Mongolia" in Meditation. The Art of Zanabazar and His School (Warsaw: State Ethnographic Museum, Poland, 2010), pp. 17–59.
- "Brief Introduction to Mongolian Modern Art" in Saara Hacklin ed., Mongolia: Perception and Utopia (Kerava Art Museum, Finland, 2008), pp. 28–40.

== Selected curatorial projects ==
- Mongol Zurag: The Art of Resistance. Garibaldi Gallery, Venice, Italy, 2024.
- Tuguldur Yondonjamts–Separated Geography from a Poem. Herron School of Art and Design, Indianapolis, Indiana, 2021.
- "Alter/Native Realities of Modern Mongolia." Asphalt Lives and Lines, Universities of Zurich and Fribourg, Switzerland, 2020–2022.
- Metamorphosis: Recent Painting & Sculpture by Tsherin Sherpa. Herron School of Art and Design, Indianapolis, Indiana, 2020.
- Mongol Zurag: The Art of Everyday (Uurintuya Dagvasambuu and Baasanjav Choijiljav). Sapar Contemporary, 2019.
- BEGINNING – 25 Years of Contemporary Mongolian Art & Curatorship. Mongolian National Modern Art Gallery, 2018.
- Other Home. Mongolia Pavilion. 56th Vince Biennale, Italy, 2015.
- "Reincarnation." Personal Structures, 56th Venice Biennale, 2015.
- Ulaanbaatar Pavilion. The Shanghai Inter-City Pavilions' Project. 9th Shanghai Biennale, 2012.
- "Modern Mongolia: From Steppe to Urban Dynamics." Hanart TZ Gallery, Hong Kong, 2011.
- "Modern Visions from Mongolia." Worth Ryder Gallery, UC Berkeley, 2005.
- "Colors from Mongolia." E&J Frankel Gallery, New York City, 2000.
