= The Cabaret =

Nonprofit theater company in Indianapolis, Indiana, US

Coordinates: 39°46′47.8″N 86°09′21.5″W

The Cabaret (formerly the American Cabaret Theatre) is one of four professional theatres in Indianapolis, Indiana, United States.

Established on January 9, 1988, the nonprofit cabaret theatre, typically doing one "book" show a season, which has included Evita, Little Shop of Horrors (with elements from the movie added), and even the spoken play, A Streetcar Named Desire. Most of its productions center on a theme and are assembled with interstitial material by founder and artistic director Claude McNeal. It has primarily used a stock company of actors including Shannon Forsell (who eventually replaced McNeal as artistic director and CEO), Brenda Williams, Jeff Owen, Tim Spradlin, and Gary DeMumbrum. Jane Lynch, Alan Cumming and Leslie Odom Jr. have all performed there.

In 2008, the company relocated to several other venues in downtown Indianapolis, including the Connoisseur Room (127 E. Ohio Street), the Columbia Club (121 Monument Circle), and the Athenæum (401 E. Michigan Street). In July 2017, the organized moved to the Metzger Building (924 N. Pennsylvania Street), alongside the Indy Arts Council.

== See also ==
- List of attractions and events in Indianapolis
