= Amiah Mims =

American artist

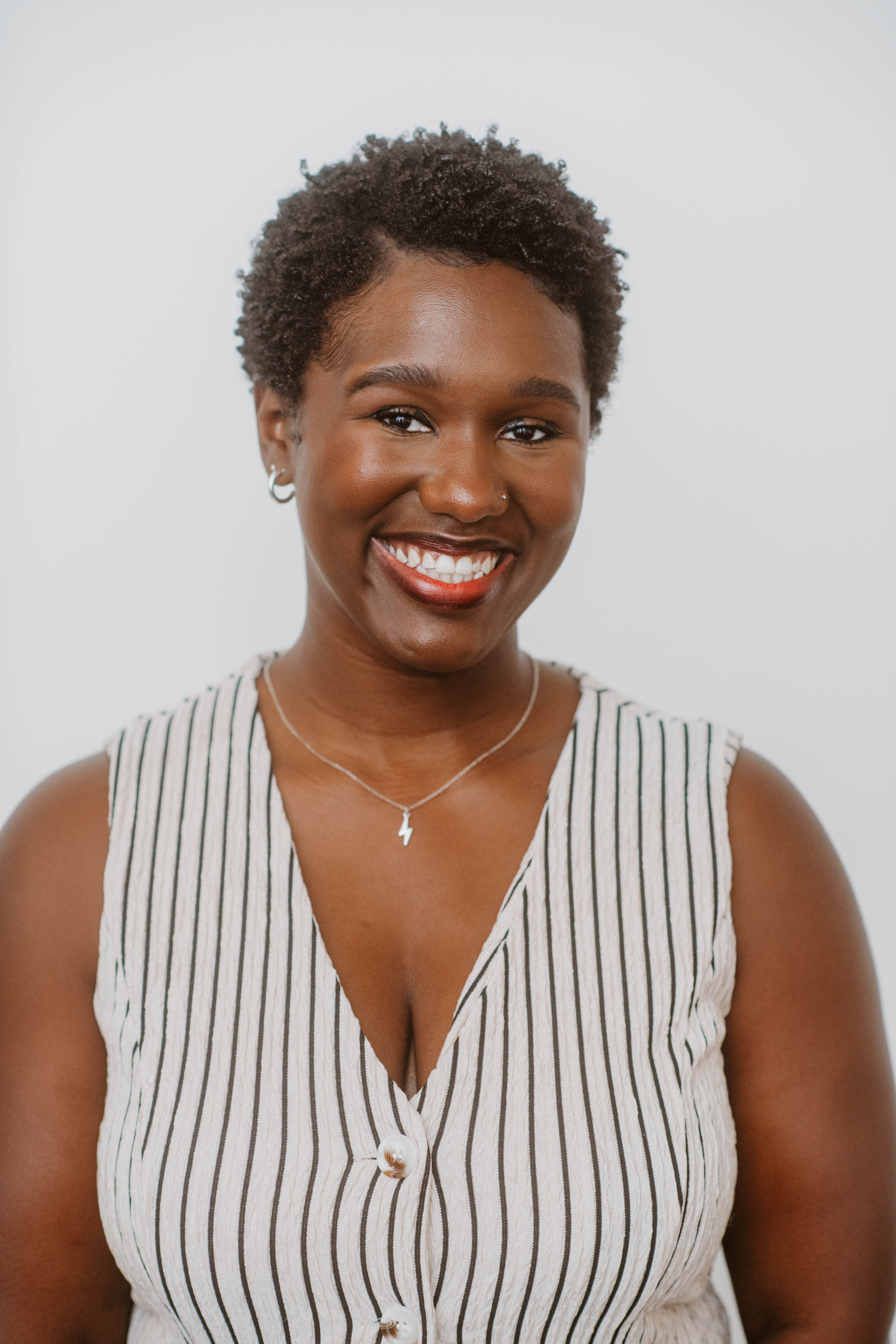
- Born: Indianapolis, Indiana
- Education: Kent State University
- Notable work: Indiana Avenue Black Lives Matter Mural, Indianapolis Recorder Mural, Cook Medical Murals

Amiah "Mimsy" Mims is an American artist based in Indianapolis, Indiana. She is a member of the Eighteen Art Collective which was responsible for the creation of the Black Lives Matter mural in Indianapolis. She created and owns a creative services business, Works By Mimsy LLC.

== Early life and education ==
Mims was born in Indianapolis only moving away briefly to attend college at Kent State University to study fashion design on a full-ride gymnastics scholarship. After the first semester, Mims switched her major to graphic design, ultimately graduating in 2015 with a major in visual communication design and a minor in photo illustration.

== Career ==
After college, Mims began working for the Indianapolis Motor Speedway (IMS) as a graphic designer, where she stayed for five years. Her work at the Speedway established connections that would help in her future artistic endeavors. Amiah Mims started her freelance art career in the summer of 2020 was when she was inspired to use her artistic talents to address racial injustice. This interest in artistic activism led to her participation in both the Black Lives Matter Boarded Window Mural Project and the Indiana Avenue Black Lives Matter mural. Mims's addition to the BLM Boarded Window Project, titled "The Silenced", was installed on 10 E. Washington Street in 2020. Mims created the mural to be a meaningful representation of the emotions of the community pertaining to the historical oppression of Black voices. For her next project, the first letter 'A' on the Indiana Avenue BLM mural, Mims planned for it to be a more "hopeful" representation of the movement. The letter included the Maya Angelou quote, "And still I rise", repeating inside the parameters with flowers growing up and around the outside. With the design, Mims intended to show how the Black community was still rising even in an oppressive environment. Mims followed these projects with her largest mural, which can be found on the side of The Indianapolis Recorder's office building. The newspaper commissioned the project to visually demonstrate the paper's historic role in publishing news by Black journalists. According to Mims, she "wanted to do something that represented generation," by depicting a design of a young man holding an open Indianapolis Recorder paper with a headline about the newspaper's history. Throughout this process Mims was aided by her father, who had worked in construction in the past, to use the ladders and scaffolding needed to reach all parts of the building's wall.

In July 2021 Mims left her job at the IMS to pursue her freelance art career full-time. As a result, Mims was able to take on more projects, including the murals for the Cook Medical building on 38th and Sheridan. This particular medical manufacturing building was built in partnership with Goodwill of Central & Southern Indiana in order to create better paying jobs for residents of the surrounding area. Mims was brought in to create two murals inside of the building to visually represent the project's connection to the neighborhood it was built for. The first mural, painted in the entrance to the building, shows two hands working on a catheter with the outline of the Indianapolis skyline in its shadow. Mims meant for the mural to give people a glimpse into what was being done inside and indicating that the work is tied to the city at large. The second mural, placed in the breakroom, was made to be a colorful piece that employees could look at on their breaks. The mural includes a cardinal and the street signs for 38th and Sheridan to bring in an Indiana theme. Mims's expectation for both murals were for them to make the point that the building was made for the workers and to give workers a sense of pride in it.

Even though Mims left her job at the IMS she maintained the network she had built in the racing community, thus leading to her role as a guest curator for the Indianapolis Motor Speedway Museum's 2022 "Sleek: Art of the Helmet" installation. This installation included 27 helmets displayed in three different sets: historic helmets, current drivers' helmets, and helmets designed by contemporary artists commissioned for the project. In addition to curating the installation, Mims also created an addition to the third set, a helmet designed to include the branding of the "Sleek" exhibit. In 2023, Mims was commissioned by Rev Indy to design ten helmets to be auctioned off at the IMS for the IU Heath Foundation's annual fundraising event. The ten helmets, each with their own unique theme, were sold and the proceeds were used to fund IU Health's trauma programs and critical care services.
