= Israel Solomon =

American artist

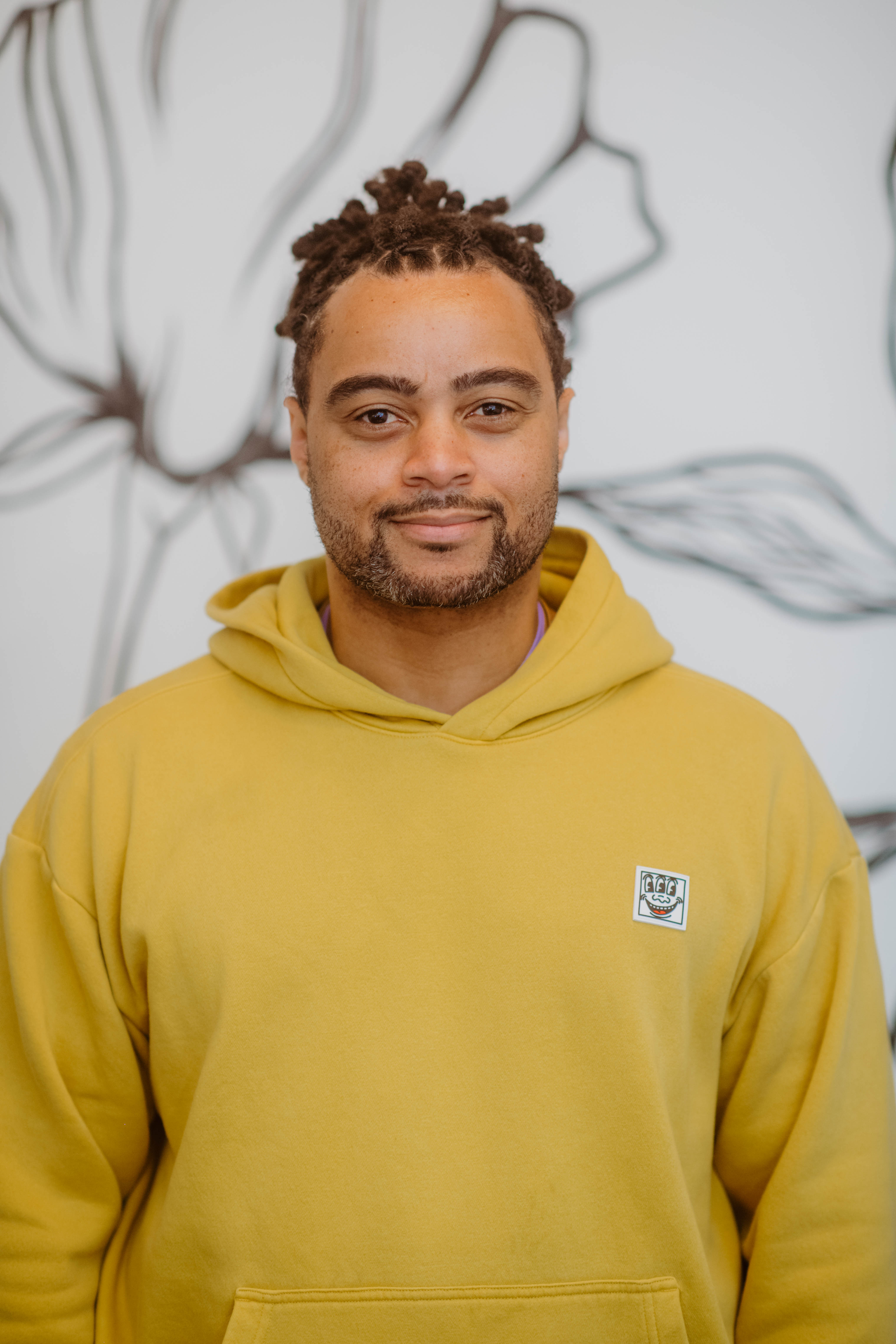
- Occupation: painter
- Website: israelsolomonart.com/art

"Lemonade Stand," 2020, 60 x 48 inches.

Israel Solomon is an American painter, muralist and educator based in Indianapolis, Indiana known for his colorful geometric paintings depicting people and community. Solomon has painted murals and exhibited work across the United States, including at the Cincinnati Art Museum, the Indianapolis Art Center, The Children's Museum of Indianapolis, and the Museum of Science and Industry (Chicago).

== Early life ==
Solomon grew up in Kokomo, Indiana. He began drawing in his childhood and enjoyed drawing with his family and watching the instructional children's PBS show The Secret City. As a less vocal child, he found visual art to be a primary form of expression. After several art classes in high school, Solomon studied art education at Ball State University, graduating in 2003. In 2019, he earned a masters of education from Marian University.

== Career ==
For a time, Solomon taught art at KIPP Indy College Prep Middle School. He is active in the Indianapolis art scene, creating public murals and exhibiting with local organizations including the Indianapolis Artsgarden, Garfield Park Arts Center, Indiana Black Expo, and the BUTTER Art Fair run by Ganggang.

In 2020, Solomon was a visiting artist at the Children's Museum of Indianapolis. He contributed to the city's Black Lives Matter street mural, drawing out the letters in a geometric font and filling in the second "T." Solomon collaborated with Major League Soccer in 2021 for their Juneteenth celebration. In 2022 he received a Creative Renewal Arts Fellowship through the Indy Arts Council, funded by Lilly Endowment. He maintains a studio at the Harrison Center.

=== Art style ===
Solomon paints with bold colors and geometric shapes, often utilizing acrylic paint on large-scale canvas. Many of his works are portraits of family, friends, community members and individuals he is inspired by.
