= Bloomingdale School (Illinois) =

- Bloomingdale School–Village Hall
- U.S. National Register of Historic Places
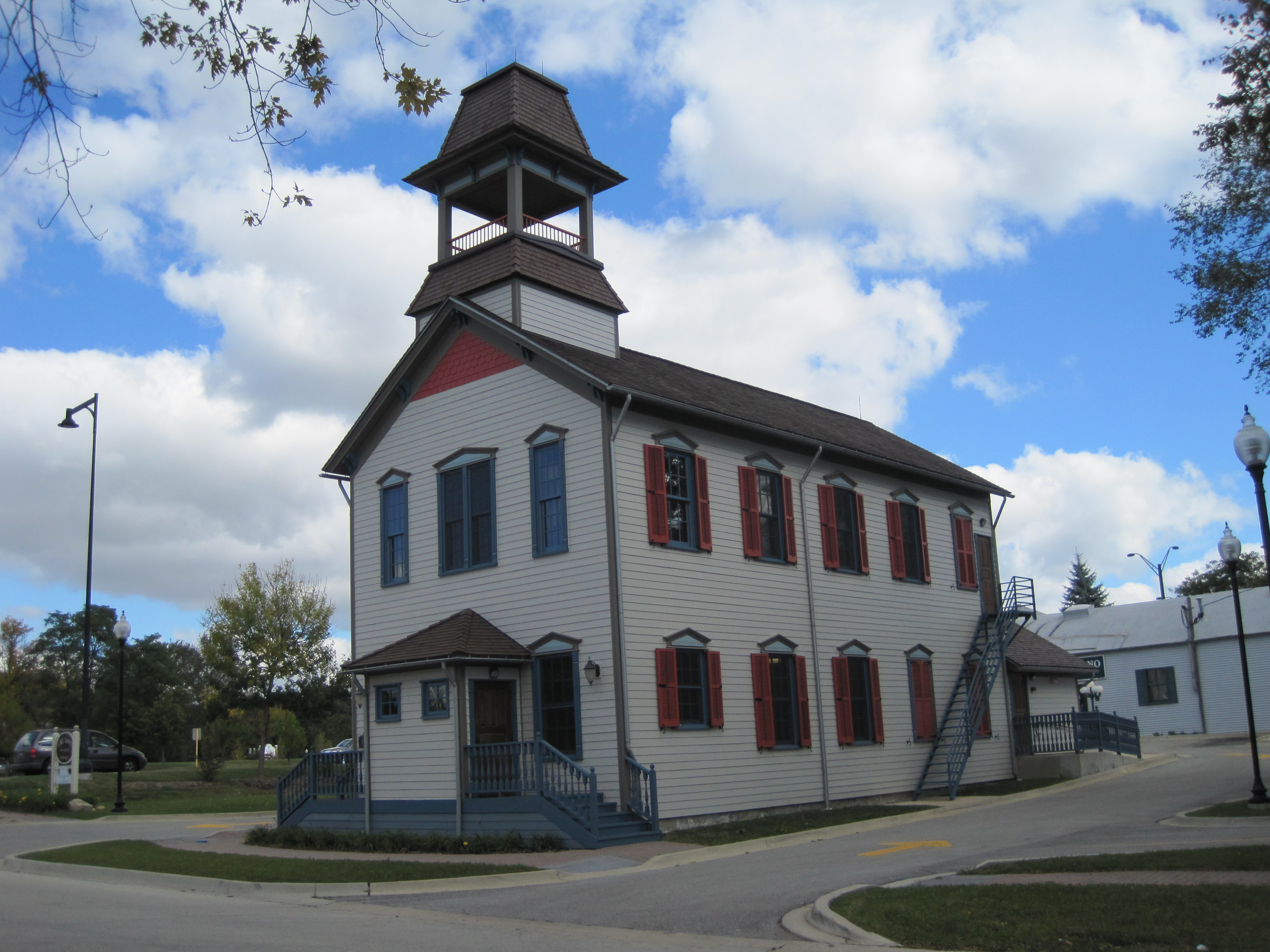

- Location within Illinois Location within the United States
- Location: 108 W. Lake St. Bloomingdale, DuPage County, Illinois
- Coordinates: 41°57′26″N 88°4′56″W
- Built: 1891
- Architectural style: Queen Anne
- NRHP reference No.: 94001263
- Added to NRHP: October 28, 1994

The Bloomingdale School is a historical building in the Queen Anne style in Bloomingdale, Illinois. In 1994 it was listed on the National Register of Historic Places as the Bloomingdale School-Village Hall.

== History ==
Illinois passed legislation in 1855 to support schools with local taxes. Five years later, the Bloomingdale Academy opened as a private high school in a former Baptist church. It closed a year later, but the building was used from 1861 to 1891 as an elementary education building. The school was moved into the newly built Bloomingdale School later that year. The former school still stands and currently functions as the Bloomingdale Park District Museum.

The new two-story Bloomingdale School was originally designated in District #7, and was re-designated to District #13 in 1902. The first story was used for grades 1 through 4, and the second story grades 5 through 8. A teacher would teach all four grades simultaneously. A new school building was erected for Bloomingdale in 1937, and classes were moved there. In lieu of destroying the old school house, the village re-purposed the building in 1938 to function as the local government headquarters. The Bloomingdale fire and police departments operated on the first floor. The school bell tower was removed and replaced with a siren and flag pole. Citizen groups were permitted to use the Village Hall for meetings. In 1977, the village offices moved to a new building to account for the town's rapid growth. The village retained control of the old Village Hall, but leased it to retailers.
