= Kevin West (artist) =

American artist

- Born: Kevin West
- Notable work: Black Lives Matter street mural (Indianapolis)
- Website: www.kwestfineart.com

Kevin West is an American visual artist based in Indianapolis, Indiana, US. His work has been featured in We. The Culture: Works by The Eighteen Art Collective, an exhibit in the Indianapolis Museum of Art at Newfields. As part of The Eighteen Art Collective, West's art highlights his experience and the comradery in the Black Community in hopes for people who are outside the community to see its beauty.

== Early life and education ==
Kevin West was introduced to fine art in high school after he had the opportunity to participate in an art competition at Georgia Tech. West attended Danville Area Community College on a Basketball scholarship where he majored in Business. His collegiate career came to a halt in 2001 when he suffered a knee injury. He then transferred to the Herron School of Art and Design at Indiana University-Purdue University Indianapolis in 2002. West made the decision to drop out of school to pick up jobs and support his family.

== Career ==
West began his career after sustaining a career ending knee injury in 2001 and decided to devote his time to painting. In 2009, West started working as an art teacher at the Keenan Stahl Boys and Girls Club. It was in this position that he thought of a custom "paint-by-number" technique to help students paint easier. After introducing this technique to his students, there was a demand from parents to have his custom "paint-by-number" paintings rose. This sparked his entrepreneurial venture, Gifted Custom Art, which he operated with his longtime friend, Kelly Hipskind. He called on Hipskind to join in partnership because he had a background in tech. Together, they came up with technology to produce what became the first fully automated, on demand, paint by number company. Their unique technology allowed the customer to send in their portrait of choice, and West would turn the portrait into a paint-by-number-canvas for the customer to paint.

Three years after starting the company, they had already garnered 286 licensed partners in the country. West and Hipskind put the company on pause citing demand and product turnaround issues. West is the CEO and Founder of West Innovations who has serviced 175 sip and paint studios and companies across the United States, including Storie Brush, Wine and Canvas, and Canvas and Cocktails, with his custom "paint-by-number" technology. In 2020, West was selected as an artist to be featured in the Black Lives Matter mural by the Indy10 Black Lives Matter and other community groups and was the contributing artist for the letter "K".

== Selected exhibitions ==
- Butter. Indianapolis, Indiana, September 2, 2021 – September 5, 2021
- We. The Culture: Works by The Eighteen Art Collective.Indianapolis Museum of Art at Newfields, Indianapolis, Indiana. September 23, 2022 – September 24, 2023
- Heart of the City. Gallery Two, Indianapolis, Indiana, August 4, 2023 – September 8, 2023
- Forever Young. Shook Gallery at Art Museum of Greater Lafayette, Lafayette, Indiana, January 20, 2024 – June 2, 2024
