= International Business College (Indianapolis) =

For-profit college in Indianapolis, Indiana

- Motto: Finish First
- Type: Private for-profit business school
- Accreditation: Accrediting Commission of Career Schools and Colleges
- President: Kathy Chiudioni
- Location: Indianapolis, Indiana, United States; 39.885516°N 86.041661°W
- Website: www.ibcindianapolis.edu

International Business College (IBC) is a private for-profit business school in Indianapolis, Indiana. It was founded in 1889 by Thomas L. Staples. In 1969, IBC was acquired by its present owners, Bradford Schools, Inc. IBC is a two-year institution and awards diplomas and associate degrees.

According to Peterson's, International Business College has an undergraduate population of 354. Of 825 applicants, 71% were admitted. Per College Navigator, the most recent graduation rate is 71%.

== Accreditation ==
International Business College is accredited by the Accrediting Commission of Career Schools and Colleges to award diplomas and associate degrees. The Medical Assistant Program is accredited by the Commission on Accreditation of Allied Health Education Programs. The Veterinary Technology program is accredited by the American Veterinary Medical Association (AVMA) Committee on Veterinary Technician Education and Activities (CVTEA). The Dental Assisting program is accredited by the Commission on Dental Accreditation of the American Dental Association.
