= Indianapolis Foundation =

Non-profit supporting Indiana residents

- Headquarters: 615 Alabama St, #300, Indianapolis, IN, 46204
- President/CEO: Ahmed Young
- Chief Equity and Innovation Officer: Michael Twyman
- Chief Development and Partnerships Officer: Grace Findley
- Board Chair: Kathy Davis
- Affiliations: Central Indiana Community Foundation (CICF)
- Website: indianapolisfoundation.org

The Indianapolis Foundation is a non-profit that works in "supporting BIPOC entrepreneurship and representation in Indiana companies and politics". This includes providing information to neighborhoods and schools and supporting racial equity and equality in communities and workplaces.

== History ==
It was started in 1915 by an Indianapolis attorney and the president of a company called the Fletcher Savings and Trust Company. The foundation was one of the first made, aside from one in Ohio in 1914. It was fully established in 1916, operating to support Indiana residents since then.

In 2018, the organization shifted from supporting Indiana residents to supporting equity and antiracism among Indiana residents. The president at the time was Lorenzo Esters, who was the one to make this shift. In 2024, this was further shown through a 5-year plan called "The Equity Imperative 2030", to be put into place the year after.

In 2025, Ahmed Young was named president/CEO of the Indianapolis Foundation. From this point, equity and social justice became the main point of focus for the Indianapolis Foundation.

== Funding ==
The Indianapolis Foundation provides funding to schools, community organizations, people, etc. There are a total of ~400 grants, money averaging in ~40k dollars, increasing to ~75k dollars in 2024. The highest grants are made for organizations to distribute and use as they see fit, with the goal of empowering Indiana residents. In 2024, they distributed a total of $96,521,773 in grants, ~$14,000,000 more than in 2023.

There are several scholarships available for students of minority groups. Majority of scholarships are not merit-based because of the desire to provide opportunities to underrepresented groups. Most of the scholarships are funded by the Indiana Foundation, and distributed by the Central Indiana Community Foundation (CICF), an affiliate and sub-organization. Scholarships distributed by the Indianapolis Foundation can be sorted by counties in Indianapolis
