= Shamira Wilson =

American artist

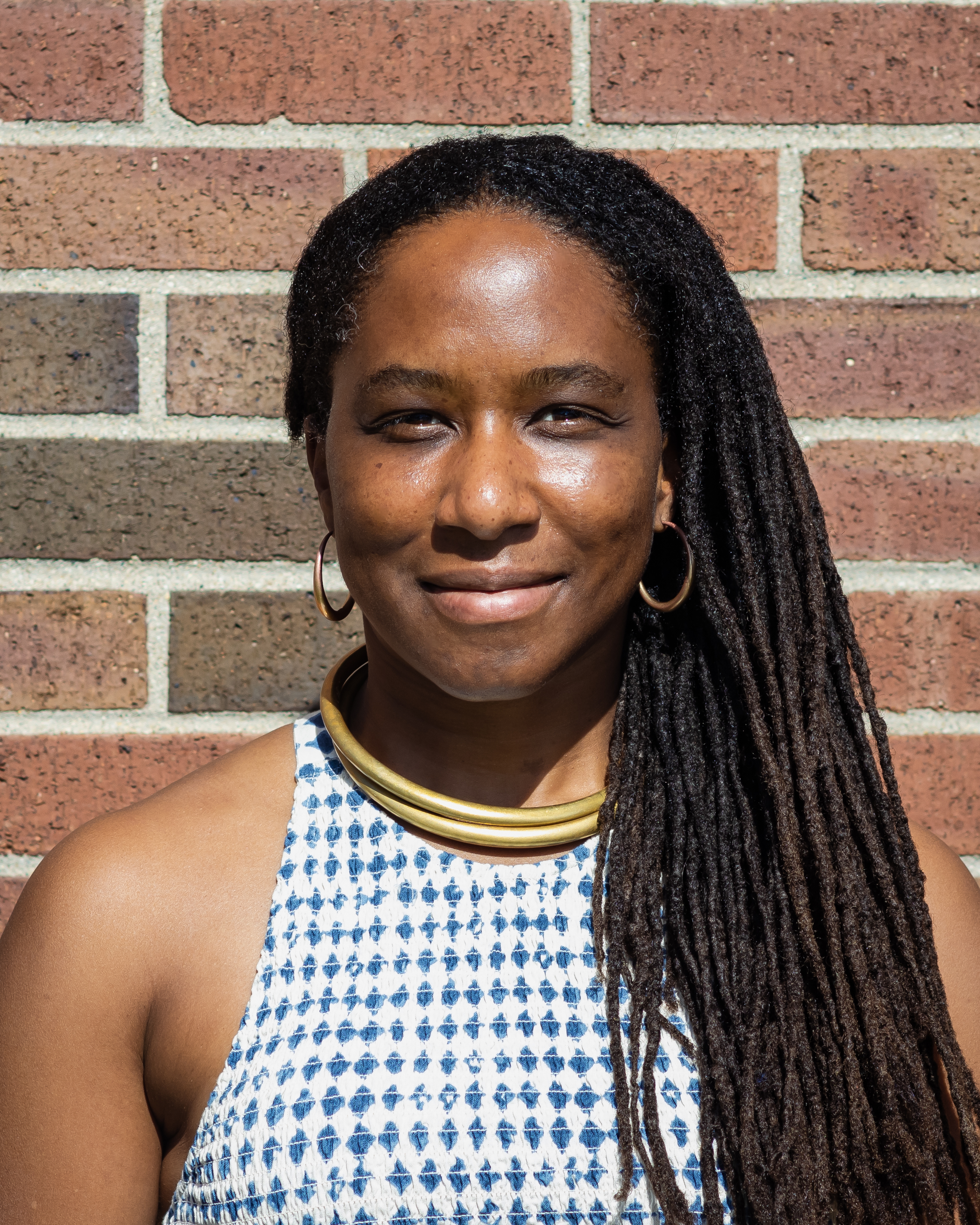
- Born: Kentucky
- Known for: Multimedia, Mural, Contemporary Art
- Notable work: Black Lives Matter street mural (Indianapolis)

Shamira Wilson is an interdisciplinary visual artist based in Indianapolis, Indiana. Wilson's work has been featured in exhibitions and installations at Newfields Indianapolis Museum of Art, the Indiana State Museum, and The Children's Museum of Indianapolis.

== Early life and education ==
Wilson was born in Kentucky and moved to Indianapolis in 1987. In 2004, Wilson graduated from Johns Hopkins University with a Bachelors of Art in Psychology. After moving back to Indianapolis Wilson attended Herron School of Art and Design to study Furniture Design.

== Career ==
Wilson works primarily with paint, textiles, and wood. As an artist, Wilson is passionate about "ethnobotany, herbalism, and geology" and creates works informed by the environment using geometric shapes.

Wilson contributed to the Black Lives Matter street mural in Indianapolis. She painted the "E" in "MATTER". Through this collaborative mural project, Wilson became a member of the art collective,The Eighteen. Wilson has displayed her works in exhibitions associated with The Eighteen: We. The Culture: Works by The Eighteen Art Collective at Newfields, Stories from Our Community: The Art of Protest at The Children's Museum of Indianapolis, and EIGHTEEN: Black Lives Matter at Indianapolis Art Center.

In 2022, Wilson contributed to an interactive installation in the Indiana State Museum's Gallery One titled, "Seed Swap".

== Selected exhibitions ==
- What to do with difference? Art Gallery, Kamladevi Complex, India International Centre (IIC). New Delhi, India. March 2021.
- Lasting Impressions. Harrison Center for the Arts. Indianapolis, IN. October 2019.
