= Bloomingdale School of Music =

Music school in New York City

Coordinates: 40.80334°N 73.96833°W

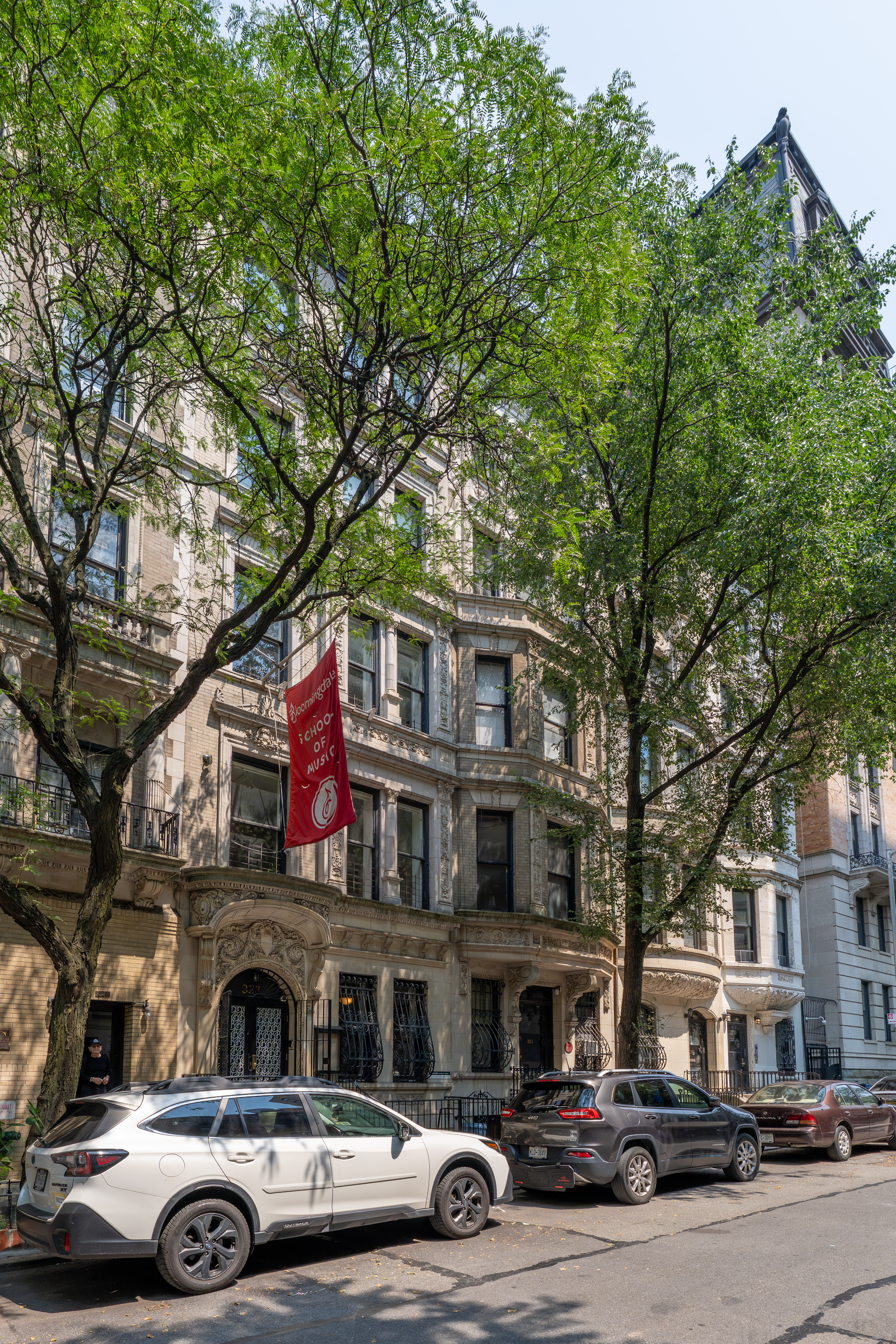
323 West 108th Street (2026)

Bloomingdale School of Music (BSM) is a non-profit community music school on the Upper West Side of New York City, in the neighborhood historically known as the Bloomingdale District. It is housed in a five-story, 102-year-old brownstone and was founded in 1964, by David D. Greer, organist and choirmaster of the West End Presbyterian Church. According to its website, BSM's mission is to "provide access to high-quality music education to anyone who seeks it, regardless of economic status, ability level, ethnicity, or religious affiliation".

The school is supported by income from tuition and fees, grants and individual donations, foundations and corporations, and the New York State Council on the Arts and the New York City Department of Cultural Affairs. BSM is tax exempt under Internal Revenue Service Code 501(C)3, and donations to the school are tax exempt to the limits of the law.

BSM is governed by a self-perpetuating Board of Directors and is a registered charity in the State of New York. It contains 13 teaching studios, a reception room, offices and the David Greer Recital Hall.

== History ==
Bloomingdale School of Music began in 1964 as a part-time school offering Saturday morning classes for as little as 50 cents to low-income community residents. Within two years, registration jumped from 75 to 200. Local residents showed such interest that founder David D. Greer was able to form a board of directors and bring together a skilled faculty. Together, they raised public and private funds to expand and, in 1971, purchased and renovated the brownstone located at 323 West 108th Street, currently the school's home. In 1980, the school purchased a rental building located at 325 West 108th Street and renovated the basement area for office space.

In 1973, BSM, which at the time was called Bloomingdale House of Music, became the first community music school to offer free weekly classes to public school children. The Orff Schulwerk program became a model for many subsequent programs.

Greer resigned in 1988 because of illness and was followed by Paul Fran. After Fran's untimely death in 1991, Lawrence Davis was appointed and served until his unexpected death in November 2013. An interim director, B.J. Adler, served until July 2014 when Erika Floreska assumed the role of the School's Executive Director. Floreska stepped down in March 2020, as Helene Blieberg stepped in as interim to lead the organization through the transition. In September 2020, Erika Atkins became the organization’s fifth executive director.

In 1996, the school launched the Piano Campaign, raising funds to renew and restore completely the school's 17 pianos.

In 2005, the school was among 406 New York City arts and social service institutions to receive part of a $20 million grant from the Carnegie Corporation, donated by New York City mayor Michael Bloomberg.

== Music Access Project ==
BSM's Music Access Project (MAP) is a preparatory program for youths living in under-served New York City communities. A comprehensive three-year program of intensive musical training, its purpose is to prepare students for entry into a conservatory, university or college for advanced music training. In addition to private lessons on their major instrument, MAP students take theory, ear training, chamber music and the biweekly MAP Forum program of master classes, lectures and demonstrations by guests. They also participate in the Bloomingdale Chamber Orchestra. Students are expected to attend at least three days a week after school, and are regularly scheduled to perform on site and outside the school. MAP graduates have matriculated at The Juilliard School, Cornell University, Eastman School of Music, Mannes College, Hunter College, Indiana University, Manhattan School of Music, University of Michigan, Montclair State University, New York University, Queens College, University of Rochester, Oberlin College, Rutgers University, Skidmore College, State University of New York at Purchase, University of Northern Colorado, Georgetown University, and Yale University.

== Online learning ==
The school's website claims its Instrument Discovery page to be "the largest collection of video instrument demonstrations available anywhere on the Internet".

In October 2008, BSM launched Theory in a Box, an online music theory course created by a team of staff and faculty from the school. After a self-assessment of its programs in 2006, the school found that students often lacked basic music theory skills and many teachers felt there was not sufficient time to teach theory in a private lesson. In addition, many students were unable to make the commitment of funds and time to come to the school for a separate music theory class. After discovering that several other schools and studios struggled with the same issue, BSM embarked on a project to create an online theory course that was easy to use and accessible to students at all times. From the work of more than 50 writers, designers, musicians, and programmers, Theory in a Box was born and is now in use at BSM as well as two other New York City-area community music schools. In 2009, the school extended the program with Theory in a Box Solo, which allows students to take the course remotely from around the country. In mid-2009, Theory in a Box School Edition was introduced as a site-license program for schools and universities.

Due to the Covid-19 pandemic, Bloomingdale has transformed music lessons and classes into online offerings.

== Public School Program ==
The oldest continuing public school collaboration in New York City, BSM's Public School Program enables 500 students in five local public schools to receive weekly, skills-based training in music. As the program is designed to be part of each school's arts plan, BSM's faculty work closely with public school teachers to integrate the program into the school's curriculum. The program has instructed almost 35,000 children, and has served as a model for similar collaborative programs. It offers class instruction in violin, viola, Orff Schulwerk, or Dalcroze.
