= India Cruse-Griffin =

American artist and educator

- Born: Richmond, Indiana
- Education: B.S. in Art Education
- Alma mater: Ball State University
- Occupation(s): Artist and educator
- Notable work: Hope Skip and Jump, Melody at Hand, Sunday Morning (collage), Friends (collage), Wading in the Water
- Website: https://indiacruse-griffin.org/

India Cruse-Griffin is an American artist and educator based in Richmond, Indiana Her work focuses on the Black experience in Indiana. She is known for her technique of painting over collaged pieces.

== Early life and education ==
Cruse-Griffin was born in Richmond, Indiana. She graduated from Ball State University with a B.S. in Art Education.

== Career ==
Cruse-Griffen designed a piece for the Eskenazi Health Art Collection in the Sidney & Lois Eskenazi Hospital called "Wading in the Water". This piece, made in 2007, is a 49.25 by 37.25 inch collage featuring a girl partially submerged in water with fish. The piece "Melody at Hand," also for the collection, shows a woman playing the guitar. This was also made in 2007.

Cruse-Griffin created "Two Moons" in 2010 for the collection. The piece shows a couple in front of houses and trees. She also designed "Friends" in 2011 for the same collection, which shows two girls side by side, one Black girl and one white girl. In 2013, she designed another piece for the collection titled "Sunday Morning." It features a row of city buildings in a 28.25 by 41.25 inch collage painted with acrylic.

In 2022, Cruse-Griffin created a variety of pieces for the Gainbridge Fieldhouse. The Court is painted on two wooden panels to showcase the emergence of Black basketball in Indianapolis, displaying children playing as part of Crispus Attucks High School, as well as in Lockefield Gardens segregated neighborhood. The Farm, painted on a single wooden panel, also focused on basketball and Indianapolis, portraying the mixture of rural and urban neighborhoods of Indianapolis with children playing. In 1955, the piece portrays the time Crispus Attucks High School team won its first state championship, making it the first all-Black team to win a state championship in the entire nation.

She also made a piece titled "Glorious Day" for the Indiana Memorial Union Collection for Indiana Memorial Union in 2023. The piece was originally shown as part of BUTTER art fair.
