= Central Indiana Community Foundation =

American non-profit supporting the arts

CICF
- Central Indiana Community Foundation
- Headquarters: 615 N. Alabama St., Ste. 300
- CEO: Jennifer Bartenbach
- CFO: Erin Tanner
- Chief Innovation Officer: Jeff Bennett
- Executive Assistant to the CEO: Jeffery Burgin III
- Parent organization: The Indianapolis Foundation and the Hamilton County Community Fund
- Website: https://www.cicf.org/

The Central Indiana Community Foundation (CICF) is a community foundation for Marion and Hamilton counties in Indiana. Marion County is home to the state's capital, Indianapolis. Hamilton County contains Noblesville, Carmel, and Zionsville. CICF connects fundholders to not-for-profits in the community that align with their interests and desired impact. CICF also grants funds from its endowments directly to causes and organizations working to improve the community.

As a steward of more that $720 million in charitable assets, CICF is among the top foundations in the state, along with Lilly Endowment and Lumina Foundation.

== History ==
The CICF was created in 1997 by the Indianapolis Foundation and the Hamilton County Community Foundation (formerly the Legacy Fund). The Indianapolis Foundation is currently an affiliate of the CICF, working specifically towards supporting BIPOC creators. The Hamilton County Community Foundation (HCCF) does similarly, though specifically works in Hamilton County and with Hamilton County residents.

== Impact ==
One of CICF's most notable projects is the Indianapolis Cultural Trail: A Legacy of Gene and Marilyn Glick. Completed in 2013 following six years of construction, the eight-mile, $63 million trail is an eight-foot-wide, two-way cycle track fully protected from traffic that connects downtown Indianapolis' arts, cultural, heritage, sports and entertainment districts. A 2015 report by the IU Public Policy Institute on the initial economic and community impact of the Trail found that property assessments within approximately one block of the eight mile Trail have increased 148% since 2008, an increase of $1 billion in assessed property value.

The CICF has many scholarships and grants for underrepresented groups. The grants and scholarships available total in about ~$20k, ranging from $500 to full tuition for college students as well as grants for artists, art programs and different charities. The CICF Artist Ambassadors Travel Grant Program offers up to $5,000 for adult full-time artists in Central Indiana. The Elevation Grant Program offers up to $250,000, and the Crime Prevention Grant Program up to $40,000 for support services in low-income and BIPOC neighborhoods. The CICF provided at least $825 million charity funds in 2020.
