= Harrison Center =

Arts nonprofit based in Indianapolis, Indiana, US

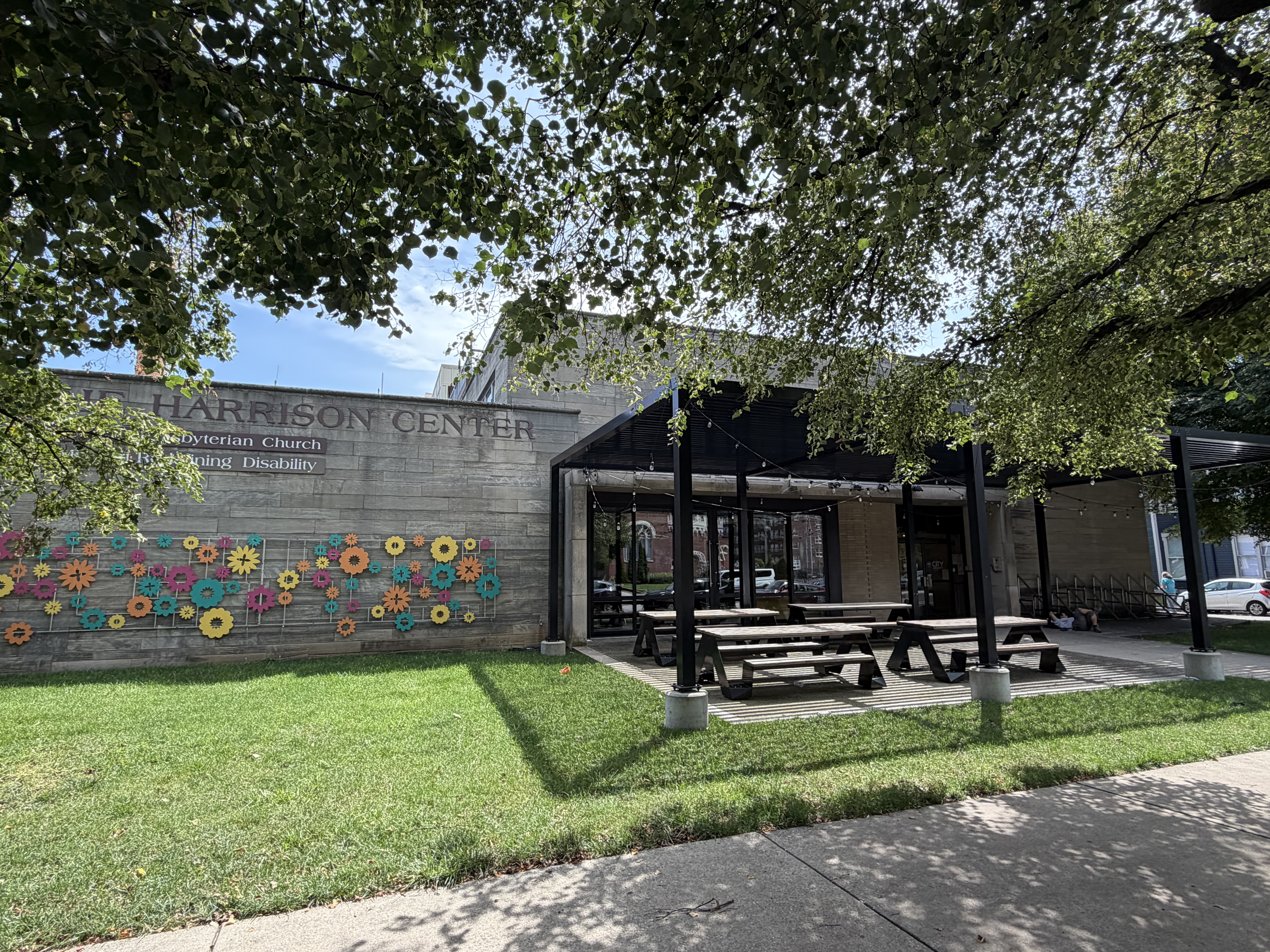
- Harrison Center exterior in 2026
- Interactive map of the Harrison Center area

General information
- Location: Old Northside Historic District, Indianapolis, Indiana, United States of America
- Completed: 1903

Harrison Center is a community-based arts nonprofit based in the Old Northside Historic District of Indianapolis, Indiana, United States. The center hosts 36 artists in 24/7 studios, eight galleries, and serves 93,000 annually.

== History ==
=== Building ===
The Harrison Center (HC) resides in a historic church building on the corner of 16th and Delaware streets. The gothic revival building was originally constructed as the fourth home of First Presbyterian Church, designed by architectural firm Cropsey & Lamm. President Benjamin Harrison was a notable congregant, elder, and Sunday school teacher at First Presbyterian for forty years. However, he did not live to see the finished construction of the church's new home in 1903. His second wife and widow, Mary Dimmick Harrison, commissioned a stained glass window for the church in memorial of Harrison. The window, Angel of the Resurrection (also referred to as the “Harrison Window”), was created by Frederick Wilson of Tiffany Studios in 1904. It was housed in the southside of the church from 1905 until 1972, whereafter it was donated to the Indianapolis Museum of Art. It now hangs on permanent display in the American Art wing of the museum.

In the 1920s, a full-sized gymnasium was added to the building. The gym, which still features its original maple parquet floor, was built to accommodate a growing need for a recreation-friendly space. Boy Scout Troop #4 regularly used the gym and their logo remains etched in the limestone exterior of the building today.

By the 1970s, the building and surrounding area were in a state of decline. However, First Presbyterian Church continued to provide needed social services to the neighborhood with the help of other congregations through the United Presbyterian Metropolitan Center. These services included a thrift store, food pantry, adult day care, preschool, and methadone clinic. By the late-1990s, the property was still in use as a thrift store and preschool, but the building had fallen into serious disrepair.

=== Organization ===
In 2000, local philanthropist Jeremy Efroymson bought and stabilized the neglected 65,000-square-foot campus before establishing the “Harrison Centre'' as a for-profit studio center. The building housed a variety of arts and nonprofit tenants including VSA Arts, Redeemer Presbyterian Church, The Nature Conservancy, IUPUI’s Herron School of Art and Design, and a few individual artists. In 2001, Efroymson closed the Harrison Centre and sold the building to Redeemer Presbyterian Church.

In 2001, Redeemer hired neighbor Joanna Taft as founding executive director of the recently reopened “Harrison Center for the Arts.” Taft appointed artist Kyle Ragsdale head curator of the institution's gallery spaces, a position he remains in today. This was also the inaugural year of the Independent Music and Art Festival (IM+AF), which operated under the title “Music Fest” until the following year. In 2024, the festival, now known as the Bloombox Festival, celebrated its 23rd year with the events coordinated as part of the Harrison Center's Cultural Entrepreneur Initiative. The center's first gallery event under new leadership opened in February 2002 and featured Ragsdale's Love in the Time of Football.

In 2003, HC became a 501(c)(3) non-religious public benefit corporation and separated its budget from Redeemer. That same year, HC converted fifteen vacant rooms into artist studios and welcomed 6,160 visitors. HC sought to grow an emerging art patron base in Indianapolis by establishing Herron High School with a grant from the Bill and Melinda Gates Foundation (through the University of Indianapolis’ Center of Excellence in Leadership of Learning). The school, which initially operated in the basement of HC in 2006, moved to its permanent campus in 2007, and is now a nationally recognized public charter school.

By 2008, HC had matured its internship program into the Cultural Entrepreneur Initiative, which was designed to provide participants with the tools necessary to build culture in Indianapolis. In 2010, HC created City Gallery, a dual gallery and urban resource café. City Gallery has since been used to connect people to culture, community, and place. The organization later established its Global Art Exchange in 2012 by welcoming two artists from Delhi's Reflection Art Gallery to collaborate with HC resident artists on the exhibition No Place Like Home. Next, HC launched the Porch Party Indy program in 2014. Initially focused on Indianapolis’ urban residents, the initiative encouraged porch gatherings among families, friends, and neighbors to further bolster a sense of community in participating neighborhoods. The following year, HC retained the Indianapolis 500 as a partner in the endeavor, expanding Porch Party Indy's coverage to the entire state.

In 2017, the organization rebranded from "Harrison Center for the Arts" to the "Harrison Center" to reflect its "for the arts and for the city" mission. That same year, the center undertook yet another community and culture building initiative with PreEnactment Theater, an annual event that acts as a visioning tool to promote equitable development in urban communities. In 2018, HC established the Greatriarch Program, promoting increased engagement and dialogue with long-term residents of the Martindale-Brightwood neighborhood. Also in 2018, HC sought to increase arts accessibility with the help of a $2.1 million grant from the Lilly Endowment. The grant went towards the fulfillment of the “Convertible” project, which saw the implementation of creative programming initiatives in an effort to make the center more approachable to a wider audience of art patrons. This included the addition of a karaoke elevator, LED tetherball, an adult-sized slide, a human-sized hamster wheel, various light installations, and special programming.

In 2021, HC's inaugural film, Rasheeda’s Freedom Day, premiered at Newfields' Tobias Theater.

== Structure ==
HC operates eight gallery spaces, a historic gymnasium, and studio space for 36 resident artists. The organization additionally supports multi-medium, place-based artist residencies for ten-week and 48-hour durations. Songwriting residencies are accommodated with a fully-outfitted "sound cave".

=== Galleries ===
HC's eight gallery spaces include the Harrison Gallery, Speck Gallery, City Gallery, Gallery Annex, Underground, Hank & Dolly's Gallery, Lift Gallery, and Sky Gallery.

== Major awards and grants ==
- In 2005, HC received NUVO's Cultural Vision Award.
- In 2006, HC received a $35,000 grant from the Christel DeHaan Family Foundation.
- In 2011, ArtPlace awarded HC with a $100,000 grant from City Gallery.
- In 2018, HC received a $2,128,160 grant from the Lilly Endowment to fund Convertible.
- In 2020, HC received the Governor's Arts Award, Indiana's highest honor recognizing arts leadership.

== See also ==
- Indy Art Center
- Indy Arts Council
- List of attractions and events in Indianapolis
