= Kyng Rhodes =

American artist

- Education: Vincennes University, 2016
- Occupation: Artist
- Known for: Black Lives Matter street mural, "Big White System", "Red Handed"
- Website: https://www.kyngrhodes.com/

Nathaniel Kyng Rhodes, known as Kyng Rhodes, is an American painter, graphic designer and muralist based in Indianapolis. His work has been featured in the Indianapolis Museum of Art, the Philadelphia Flower Show, Gainbridge Fieldhouse, the 2024 U.S. Olympic Swim Trials, and at BUTTER art fair. As member of the Eighteen Collective, he contributed to Black Lives Matter street mural (Indianapolis).

== Early life and education ==
Rhodes's artistic endeavors started at the age of three after he rifled through his mother's cosmetic products and then proceeded to use them as his medium when drawing on the walls and furniture of his home. After this, Rhodes was often gifted art supplies by family members.

Rhodes graduated from Arsenal Tech High School in 2012 and attended Vincennes University. Rhodes studied graphic and graduated in 2016.

== Career ==
After college, Rhodes worked as a graphic designer. During the summer of 2020, Rhodes participated in one of Indianapolis's Black Lives Matter protests while holding up a painting he created depicting a fist. He was discovered by Malina Simone Bacon and Alan Bacon, the co-founders of GANGGANG, who offered to purchase his painting. Rhodes rejected their offer at the time, but later participated in the Black Lives Matter street mural in Indianapolis at their invitation.

Rhodes painted the letter "B" in the Indianapolis Black Lives Matter street mural in the summer of 2020.He was inspired by Kente fabric and used colour to symbolize privileged lives (green), unprivileged lives (red), and the systematic division in between them (blue). A red handprint and Afro pick respectively symbolized lives lost in Indianapolis due to police brutality and the "coarseness" of African American's hair and lives. Rhodes painted the mural with seventeen fellow black artists who all collectively became known as the Eighteen Collective. Rhodes' employer fired him after the mural's completion, claiming that he was bringing negative attention to their company and causing them to lose clients. At this point he became an independent artist.

In 2022, Rhodes was chosen to be a part of the new Gainbridge Fieldhouse galleries incorporating historical photographs and commissioned artwork to show the history of basketball in Indiana. As one of the twenty-two artists selected for this project, Rhodes painted a series of pieces depicting Pacers' icons from the American Basketball Association era of the team in floral environments. Rhodes's paintings are located on the Key Bank Suites Level of the building. A free open house called "The Art of the Game" was held at Gainbridge Fieldhouse on October 10, 2022, to display the new works of art.

The Eighteen Collective were invited to the Indianapolist Museum of Art at Newfields to have a year-long exhibit that would display their individual pieces outside of the mural. This exhibit, titled "We. The Culture," was up in the museum from September 2022 until September 2023, and it included two paintings by Rhodes: "Colored King" and "Woman in Paradise".

For the Philadelphia Flower Show, the museum invited Rhodes to create a mural that would highlight the concept of art in nature. Rhodes painted birds spreading seeds over a garden and into places where they previously were not "allowed to grow" as a symbolic representation of how he expected to see Newfields's connection with the underrepresented artists in the community grow. Rhodes uses floral elements as a symbolic representation of the possibility of growth and good things to come. The mural was titled "Newfound Fields" by Rhodes and was made up of eighteen 4-foot by 8-foot panels painted by the artist in a little over a month. The work won The Philadelphia Trophy, The Pennsylvania Horticultural Society (PHS) Council Trophy, and the PHS gold medal.

In May 2023, Newfields reopened their American galleries under the title "Work in Progress: Conversations about American Art", featuring two of Rhodes' paintings: "Big White System" (2022) and "Red Handed" (2022). The artists selected to contribute work called themselves "The Looking Glass Alliance" and included Nasreen Khan, Tatjana Rebelle, Jordan Ryans, Bobby Young, and Rhodes. Rhodes contributed to the development of "Work in Progress" by painting two pieces in response to preexisting paintings in the Newfields collection with the aim of filling in the blanks in the original paintings' narratives. "Red Handed," referred to the red handprint from the Black Lives Matter mural, and was painted in response to Barkley Hendricks's "Dr. Kool" (1973) painting. Rhodes depicted a contemporary black man "caught" being black in the light of America's criticism While the man is depicted as confident, even holding a peacock feather in his breast pocket to symbolize the pride he has in his Blackness, the style of clothing he is wearing could be seen as funerary. Rhodes intended "Red Handed" to show what happens to a black man who is targeted based on his outward appearance. "Big White System" was Rhodes's response to John Wesley Hardrick's "Little Brown Girl" (1927). "Big White System" was meant to highlight the "omitted" historical context behind "Little Brown Girl," which was painted during a time in which the Ku Klux Klan was having a resurgence in Indiana.

In 2024, Rhodes was selected to be a part of the All Lanes Lead to Indy Art Project. The Indy Arts Council, Indiana Sports Corp. and USA Swimming chose five artists to create original artwork to welcome attendees of the U.S. Olympic Swimming Trials at the Lucus Oil Stadium in Indianapolis. Joy Hernandez, Lucie Rice, Mary Mindiola, and Monroe Bush and Rhodes were selected. Rhodes's piece was a painting titled "Emerge," and aimed to bring attention to those in the black community who might not have the money for swim classes.

In late 2024, Rhodes' work was featured in "Self-serenades." The exhibition was a collaboration between the Indianapolis Symphony Orchestra and GANGGANG, and included two exhibitions ("Self-Serenades" and "Hector Del Campo: Perennial Topographies") located in the Oval Promenade and Wood Room at the Hilbert Circle Theatre.

== Work ==
- "Colored King" and "Woman of Paradise," We. The Culture at Newfields (2022–2023)
- PHS Philadelphia Flower Show Mural (2023)
- Work in Progress: Conversations about American Art (2023)
- "Monkey See, Monkey Do," BUTTER Art Fair, 2023.
- "Reasons" at the Indiana Memorial Union art collection, Indiana University, Bloomington.
