= Bakehouse Art Complex =

Arts organization in Miami, Florida

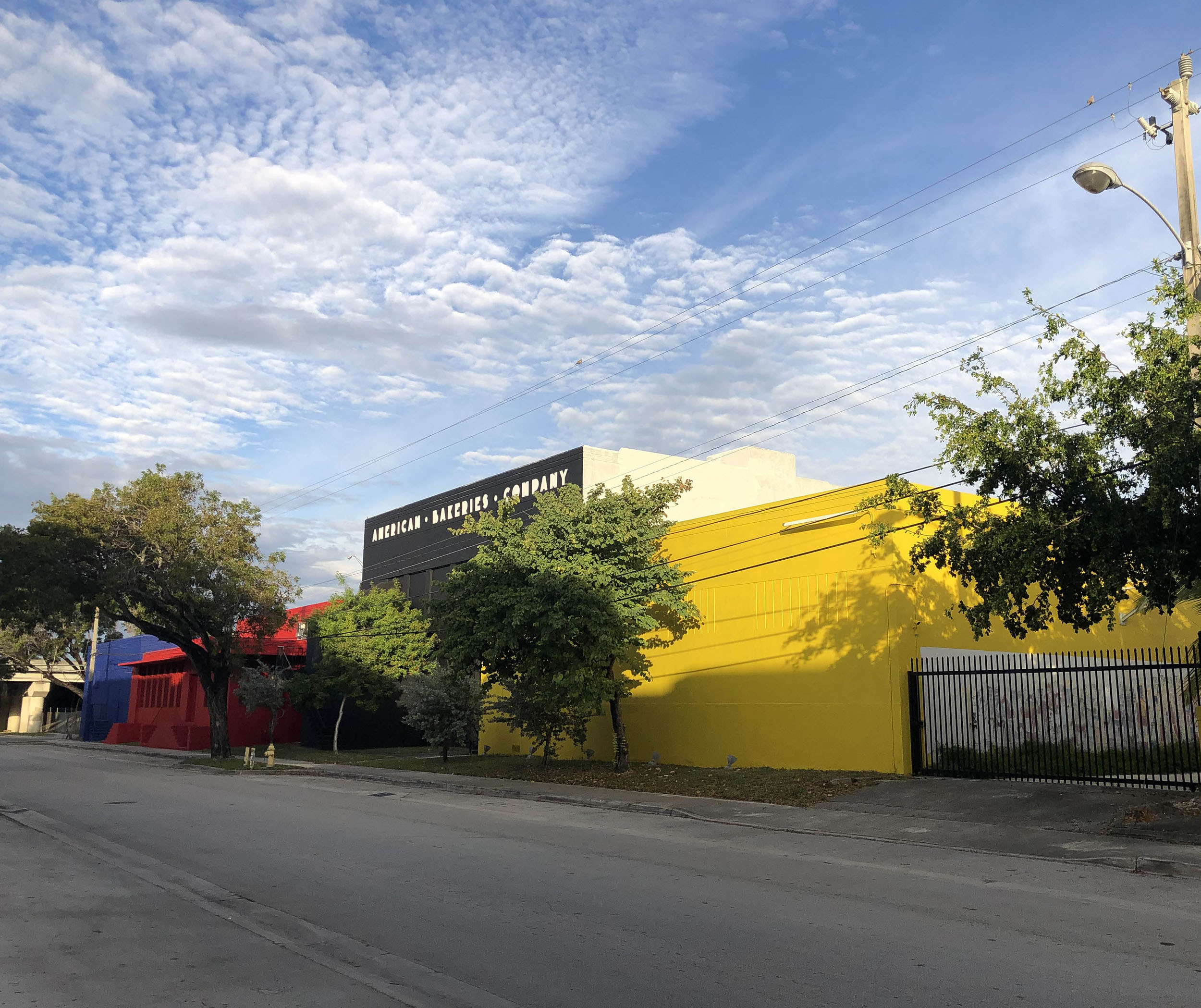
- Bakehouse Art Complex
- Interactive map of Bakehouse Art Complex
- Address: 561 NW 32nd Street, Wynwood; Miami, Florida; US
- Coordinates: 25.807°N 80.205°W
- Type: Arts center

Construction
- Opened: 1985

Website
- www.bacfl.org

Bakehouse Art Complex is an arts organization in Miami, Florida, United States. Founded in 1985, it comprises studio spaces, art production facilities, galleries, and educational programming.

== Mission ==
Bakehouse Art Complex is operated as a non-profit organization. The founding mission of Bakehouse is to support local artists by providing low-cost studio space in Miami's urban core. It was influenced by similar complexes Torpedo Factory Art Center in Alexandria, Virginia, and the Art Place in New Orleans. According to co-founder Helene Pancoast, "We felt the time had come for Miami to have a working art facility, a gathering place for visual artists".

A secondary goal is to "contribute to the economic and community development of the neighborhood". According to a city memo, it "plays a major role in addressing a significant gap in the city's cultural ecosystem, affordable spaces where artists can create, live, and engage with each other and with the greater community".

== History ==
Bakehouse Art Complex was founded in 1985. The founders were artists who had previously been working in studio spaces in the Coconut Grove area in the Grove House. The resident artists faced eviction when the area underwent redevelopment. One group formed the South Florida Art Centre; a second (including Helene Pancoast, Faith Atlass, and David and Nathalie Nadel) purchased the former Flowers Bakery belonging to the American Bakeries Company, which had operated at the site from 1926 before being abandoned in 1977. The City of Miami financed the purchase and granted it to the artists' nonprofit organization under the terms of a 1986 covenant which required the bakery to be preserved for use by artists. According to the Miami Herald, a "warranty deed shows a $10 transaction in 1985 between The Bakehouse Art Complex Inc., and the Miami Baking Co. According to a 1998 New York Times story, the appraisal of the land was $900,000".

The nonprofit received grant funding of $225,000 from the city and county to retrofit the site. Bakehouse commissioned local artists to decorate the walls with murals and graffiti. Pancoast's husband was an architect who assigned Joaquín Rodriguez from his firm to plan the site free of charge. The facility opened in on February 1, 1987, with 65 artists and the South End Alternative Theater.

Vivian Rodriguez was hired as the facility's first director in 1987, one of two paid staff at the time; the other was Joe Gedeon, who had previously worked at the bakery on the site. Bakehouse created the Children's Art Workshop in 1989 to support arts education for underprivileged children. This program was recognized by the President's Committee on the Arts and Humanities in 1996. The complex's galleries, the Swenson and Audrey Love, were dedicated and developed under Rodriguez.

The M Ensemble Company was resident in the complex in the early 1990s. Helene Pancoast also served as director during this period. Pola Reydburd was named executive director in 1996 but resigned the following year, as did an interim successor. One of the galleries had been condemned as structurally unsafe, requiring significant fundraising for renovations in order to qualify for a mortgage extension. A contemporary newspaper report noted that "Gaps in leadership and funding have plagued this ambitious cultural institution", but the board "is showing the resourcefulness and creativity to prevail".

The Edge Theatre company was resident for a time but was evicted from Bakehouse in 2001. Arlys Raymond served as executive director from 2007 to 2013, replacing Doris Melzer. Raymond, who had a business background, implemented a standardized rental pricing structure and a jury process for accepting new artists, resulting in a number of previous tenants departing. She was succeeded by Marte Siebenhar. A 2015 courtyard design won an award from the American Institute of Architects Miami. Bibi Baloyra became executive director in 2016.

In 2018 the board determined that Bakehouse was "underutilized and underperforming". They hired Cathy Leff to act as director, and received a $150,000 grant from the Knight Foundation to develop a new strategic plan.

The complex was required to close for two months in 2020 as a result of the COVID-19 pandemic. In response Bakehouse launched a virtual platform, called Fresh Goods, "the first step in a broader plan to expand Bakehouse's impact and influence both on the Wynwood Norte neighborhood and on Miami's role as a center for working artists".

In 2021 the City of Miami Commissioners approved the creation of the Wynwood Norte Neighborhood Revitalization District, planned by the Wynwood Community Enhancement Association, which included representatives from Bakehouse. The plan "is intended to protect the neighborhood's unique character while improving the area's housing stock", by "incentiviz[ing] new and additional affordable and workforce housing to mitigate displacement". Land use and zoning changes in the area allowed Bakehouse to begin planning the development of affordable housing units on the campus. Art critic Elisa Turner expressed appreciation for the announcement, stating "the Bakehouse is moving forward to play a far more active role in Miami's maturing art community". Bakehouse also plans a renovation project in conjunction with the housing development. City commissioners allotted $2 million to Bakehouse for renovations in 2022.

== Campus ==
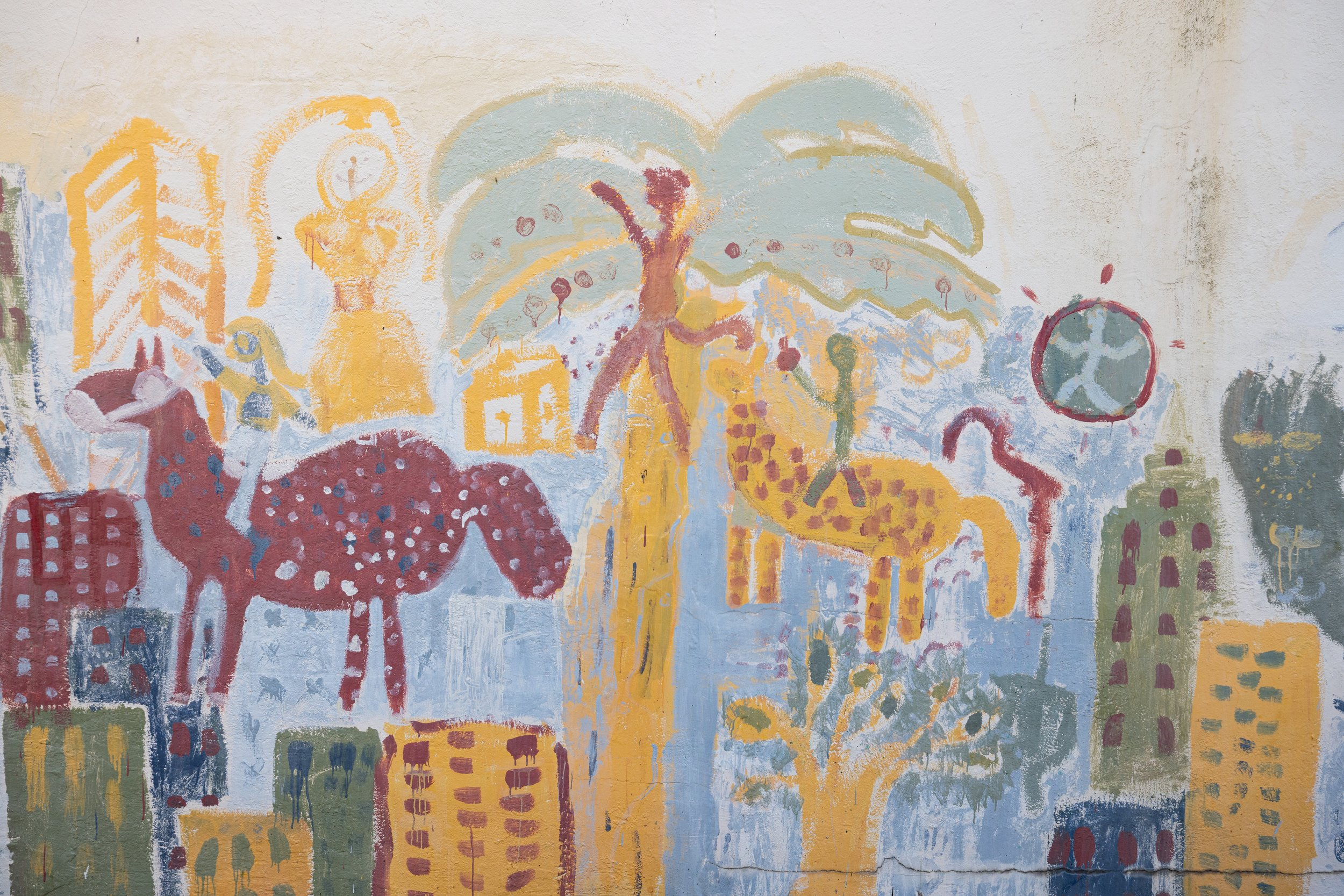
Purvis Young mural at Bakehouse Art Complex

The organization is housed in a 33,000 square feet (3,100 m^{2}) Art Deco style former industrial bakery on a 2.3-acre (0.93 ha) campus in Wynwood, Miami. The campus comprises the former bakery building, a large parking lot, and some ancillary structures. The two silos overlooking the courtyard are an area landmark. The bakery houses 60 studios which are occupied by around 100 artists. It also includes two exhibition galleries, as well as production facilities for photography, printmaking, woodworking, ceramics, and welding.

In addition to the Bakehouse programs, the campus is also home to the Bookleggers Library and a 24-hour bookbox.

Bakehouse began inviting local street artists to decorate the exterior walls in 1986, decades before the similar initiative which would become the Wynwood Walls. The west wall is currently covered by a mural titled "Say Their Names", recognizing people "who were killed by gun violence, domestic violence and police brutality". The north wall's mural, "Ode to Bakehouse" by Arsimmer McCoy and Chris Friday, was created in 2021 in honor of Bakehouse's 35th anniversary. The complex also includes one of only three surviving Miami murals by artist Purvis Young. This artwork underwent extensive conservation work in 2023 using funding from Bank of America.

== Exhibitions and artists ==
Early exhibitions included Ceramic League shows led by Jean Waldberg and theatrical performances by South End Alternative Theatre and M Ensemble Company. In 2015 Bakehouse hosted an exhibition of etchings by Pablo Picasso. More recent exhibitions include a program on climate activism and a "ritual of remembrance" for victims of gun violence. The complex also participates in Art Basel, which "helped it grow exponentially, and has spurred numerous short-term satellite shows during the annual event", as well as a breakfast buffet.

Notable artists who have worked or exhibited at Bakehouse include Nakajima Hiroyuki, Robert Chambers, Jude Broughan, Jillian Mayer, Stephen Baron Johnson, María Martínez-Cañas, Sandra Ramos, and Aja Monet.

== Programming ==
Alongside the galleries, the studio spaces are also open to the public during hours of operation. Visitors are able to access the complex for free and speak to the artists. The complex also hosts open workshops and classes. According to painter Bernadette Despujols, "Bakehouse is a reference point for many artists in great part due to the dialogue it generates in the community".

The complex hosts an annual Summer Open artist residency program. In 2022 Bakehouse announced a program to offer an artist residency at Cité internationale des arts in Paris.

== Operations ==
Studio spaces at Bakehouse are partially or wholly subsidized to ensure accessibility for artists. Artists applying for space are evaluated based on criteria including need, artistic merit, and "creating a community that is diverse in both the artists' cultural background, as well as their medium and discipline". Accepted artists receive studio space for a year, after which they must reapply. As of 2017 there had been 1200 resident and associate artists.

In 2022 the Knight Foundation announced a $1-million-dollar grant to Bakehouse. Bakehouse has also received grant funding from organizations including the National Endowment for the Arts, the Pérez Foundation, and Bank of America. Grants alongside donations support the costs of workshops and lectures.
