= Jérôme Soimaud =

French painter

Jérôme Soimaud (born 1964 in Paris, France) is a contemporary Miami-based painter known for his depictions of minority subjects in urban settings, and his dedication to portraying unheard voices and "black culture". Soimaud makes a conscious effort to portray these communities, stating, “Your eyes are your first steps towards education; therefore your work should exude energy, strength and love."

His work has been featured in several solo exhibitions, from Florida to his native France. Soimaud's Studio is located in the heart of Little Haiti in Miami, Florida. Soimaud's work expands recognition of the various African Diaspora communities throughout the world.

== Biography ==
From a young age, Soimaud was exposed to creativity. His father, Jean-Pierre Soimaud, was a Parisian designer who owned a boutique called O'Kennedy on the Champs-Élysées and his stepmother, Catherine Alain Bernard, former Editor-in-Chief of French Elle Magazine and Depeche Mode Magazine. Spending much time in the studio, Soimaud learned the fashion business, but more importantly he watched fashion luminaries at work, which inspired his own creative process later on in his art career.

After graduating from Lycee Racine in Paris, Soimaud apprenticed at the Ecole Superieure d'Architecture de la Ville de Paris as well as the Academie de la Grand Chaumiere in 1982, where he fine-tuned his abilities before leaving school in order to travel. While journeying throughout Asia, Africa, and South America, Soimaud went out of his way to integrate amongst the people in order to better understand them. Visiting Colombia in 1986, during the height of Pablo Escobar's power, Soimaud ignored warnings of danger in order to paint people of lower socio-economic status, causing some to applaud his love of South America.

== Art ==
Soimaud's career spans 25 years; the main mediums for his work include charcoal drawing, oil painting, and photography. Largely self-taught, Soimaud cites influences from Impressionism, Les Nabis, Abstract Expressionism, and Dada. A top Miami art critic, Elisa Turner, said about his work, “With a rare gift for evoking the soul of street life at the fringe of fabulous wealth, his [Soimaud's] art documents the grit and groan of tough neighborhoods.” Soimaud's work draws inspiration from the settings he places himself into, be they a small village in South America, or the ugly truths of urban life; his work speaks honestly to the experiences of those he meets. “His broad life experiences are reflective in his work, which mostly focuses on life in the downtrodden communities of the African Diasporas around the world.” His latest projects focus on chronicling the underbelly of Miami, as well as featuring aspects of Haitian culture, including symbolism linked to Vodou ceremonies and the large Haitian community in Miami.

Besides his large-scale works, Soimaud has done book covers for a number of publishers, including Temple University Press and L'Harmattan.

In 2012, Soimaud's artistic work on the Haitian Diaspora received recognition from University of Florida and Duke University in the forms of grants (where his works are housed in their Digital collections), as well as from the John and James L. Knight Foundation as a 2009 Knight Art Challenge Finalist.

During the Art Basel 2013 show in Miami, Blouin ArtInfo called his exhibition, Genesis, a “must see”.

== Exhibitions ==
- 2013 Genesis, Yeelen Gallery, Miami, Florida
- 2012 Keeping Haiti in Our Hearts, Crealde Art School, Winter Park, Florida
- 2011-12 Possession, Yeelen Art Gallery, Miami, Florida 2011 Ayiti Kriye, Yeelen Art Gallery, Miami, Florida
- 2010 Ayiti Kriye, Art For a Better World, Wynwood, Florida
- 2009 Kanzo, Yeelen Art Gallery, Miami, Florida
- 2009 Around Jenin's, Yeelen Art Gallery, Miami, Florida
- 2008 Midtown: Miami B-Side, Yeelen Art Gallery Miami, Florida
- 2007 Tropics, Jerome Soimaud Studios, Miami, Florida
- 2006 Recent Works, Jerome Soimaud Studios, Miami, Florida
- 1997 Art Show Bruxelles, Bruxelles, Belgium
- 1997 Art Paris, Paris, France
- 1996-97 Bastille Art Show, Paris, France
