= List of people from Lakeland, Florida =

This is a list of famous people from Lakeland, Florida.

== Entertainment ==
- Nat Adderley, jazz cornetist and composer
- Lindsey Alley, Mouseketeer and actress
- Bobby Braddock, record producer in Country Music Hall of Fame
- Copeland, pop/alternative rock band
- Jonny Diaz, Christian musician
- Samantha Dorman, Playboy Playmate
- Rhea Durham, Victoria's Secret model
- Faith Evans, singer
- Stephen Baron Johnson, painter
- Frances Langford, singer, actress, and radio star (1930s and 1940s)
- Neva Jane Langley, Miss America 1953
- Mike Marshall, bluegrass musician and mandolinist
- Kara Monaco, Playboy Playmate
- Karen Olivo, Broadway actress
- Robert Phillips, guitarist
- Forrest Sawyer, NBC reporter and anchor
- J. D. Sumner, singer-songwriter
- Rick Yancey, author

== Sports ==
- Andy Bean, PGA Tour golfer
- Ahmad Black, NFL player, Tampa Bay Buccaneers
- Keon Broxton, Milwaukee Brewers center fielder
- Desmond Clark, NFL player, Chicago Bears
- Lance Davis, MLB player, Cincinnati Reds
- Matt Diaz, MLB player, Atlanta Braves
- Paul Edinger, NFL player, Minnesota Vikings and Chicago Bears
- Justin Forsett, running back, UC Berkeley
- Carson Fulmer, former Vanderbilt baseball player, drafted 8th overall by Chicago White Sox
- Ronnie Ghent, football player
- Matt Grothe, quarterback, South Florida Bulls
- Nick Hamilton, pro wrestling referee
- Alice Haylett, AAGPBL All-Star pitcher
- Lee Janzen, PGA Tour golfer, U.S. Open winner
- Ray Lewis, NFL player, Baltimore Ravens, Super Bowl champion and MVP, 2-time NFL Defensive Player of the Year
- Rocco Mediate, PGA Tour golfer
- Freddie Mitchell, NFL player, Philadelphia Eagles and Kansas City Chiefs
- Joe Nemechek, NASCAR Sprint Cup driver
- Joe Niekro, MLB player
- Lance Niekro, MLB player, San Francisco Giants
- Steve Pearce, MLB player, Toronto Blue Jays
- Maurkice Pouncey, NFL player, Pittsburgh Steelers
- Mike Pouncey, NFL player, Miami Dolphins
- Boog Powell, MLB player, Baltimore Orioles
- Chris Rainey, NFL player, Pittsburgh Steelers
- Andrew Reynolds, professional skateboarder
- Chris Richard, NBA, Minnesota Timberwolves, Chicago Bulls
- Chris Sale, MLB player, Boston Red Sox
- Brenda Sell, Taekwondo Grandmaster
- Rod Smart, NFL & XFL player
- Donnell Smith, NFL player, Green Bay Packers and New England Patriots
- Ron Smith, NFL player, Los Angeles Rams
- Bill Spivey, basketball player
- Jameson Taillon, MLB pitcher, Pittsburgh Pirates
- Justin Verlander, MLB pitcher, Houston Astros
- Keydrick Vincent, NFL player, Baltimore Ravens
- Chris Waters, MLB player, Milwaukee Brewers
- Lou Whitaker, MLB player, Detroit Tigers

== Other ==
- Charles T. Canady, chief justice, Florida Supreme Court
- Lawton Chiles, senator and governor of Florida
- Scott Franklin, U.S. representative and former Lakeland city commissioner
- George W. Jenkins, founder of Publix Super Markets
- Carol Jenkins Barnett, philanthropist and businesswoman, daughter of George W. Jenkins
- R. Albert Mohler Jr., president of Southern Baptist Theological Seminary
- Marvin Pipkin, scientist engineer who had many inventions and innovations for the light bulb
- Gene Ready, Florida businessman and state legislator
- Charles Z. Smith, associate justice, Washington State Supreme Court
- Park Trammell, mayor of Lakeland, Florida attorney general, governor of Florida and U.S. senator
