= Cortney Herron =

American artist

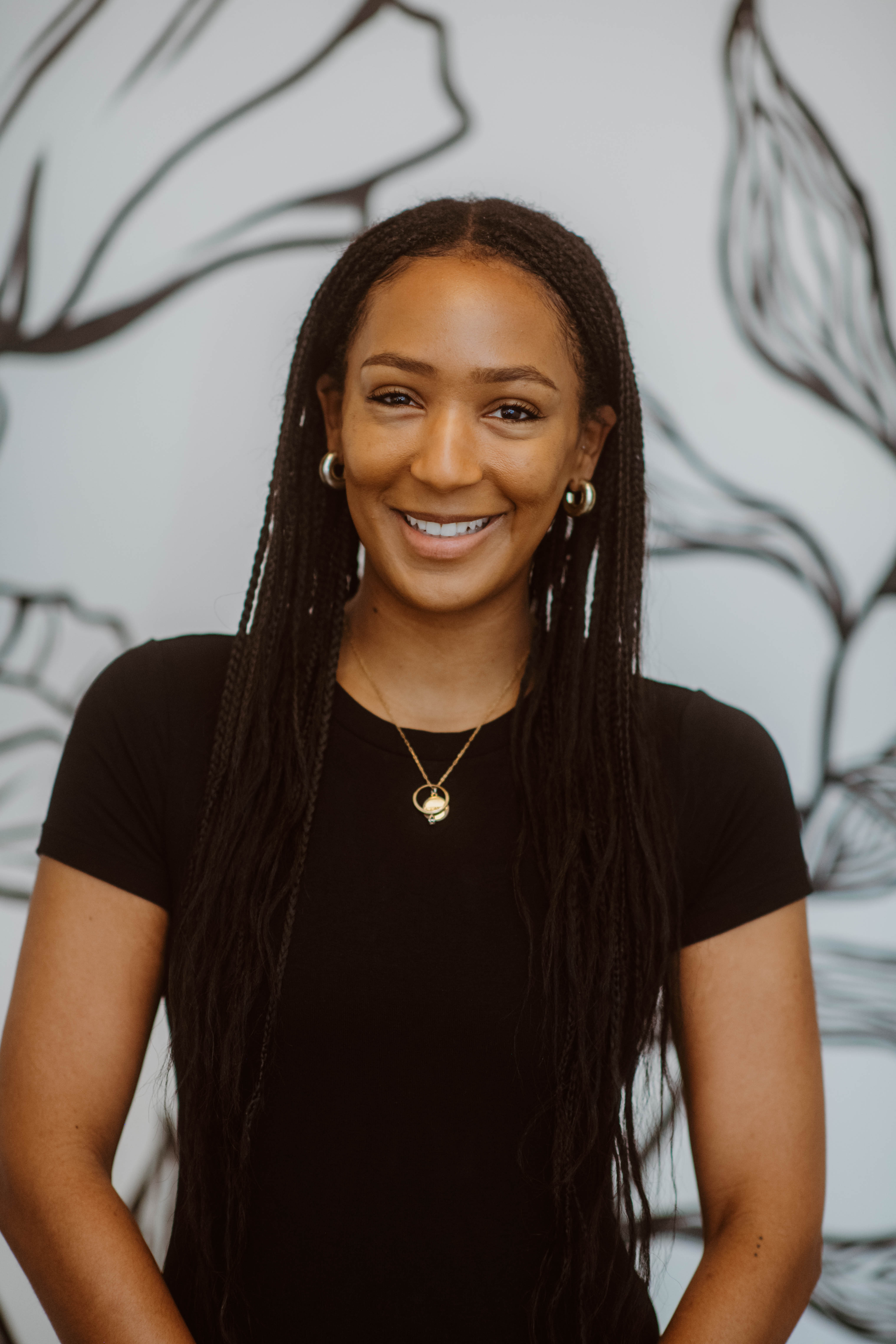
- Cortney Herron at Butter Art Fair + Black Lunch Table's Photo Booth in Indianapolis, IN. 2024.
- Born: 1988 (age 37–38); Los Angeles, CA
- Website: https://cortneyherron.com/

Cortney Herron is a contemporary figurative painter and illustrator based in Los Angeles, California.

== Early life and education ==
Herron was born and raised in Los Angeles, California. She began painting at the age of three and continued to make art throughout high school. Herron attended the University of California, Davis where she obtained a degree in Visual Communication Design.

== Career ==
Herron's first full-time job after graduating from college was as a content manager for the online art marketplace Fine Art America. After working in this position for four years, Herron began to create art again while maintaining her day job. Herron left her position at Fine Art America after nearly seven years of employment and moved into the personal development industry.

In 2022, Herron's work was featured in Deep Space Gallery (77 Cornelison Ave.) as a part of “Mothership Connection,” an all-female art show. In 2023, the Deep Space Gallery celebrated its seventh year of business by holding the show "777". Nearly every artist who had work featured in the gallery in previous years contributed to “777" culminating into a show of eighty-plus pieces. In accordance with the casino theme of the show, Herron contributed a painting of a ruminative gambler. In 2023, Herron also shifted into being a full-time artist.

From April 4 to 7 2024, Herron participated in Saatchi Art’s The Other Art Fair in Los Angeles, California.

In 2025, Cortney Herron, Julian Jamaal Jones, and Sydneé Bethe collaborated with Pressed Juicery. The three artists were commissioned by Pressed Juicery to create artwork for their bottles in order to celebrate Black History Month. The special edition bottles were only sold in the month of February in 2025. Herron provided the image of her painting titled "Bloom" for the special edition Citrus 2 bottle.

Herron participated in the 2026 BUTTER Fine Art Fair in Los Angeles. The fair took place at Hollywood Park in Inglewood from February 28 to March 1, 2026.
