= Nasreen Khan =

Artist and educator

- Website: https://nasreen-khan.com/#home

Nasreen Khan is an artist and educator who grew up in Indonesia and Senegal. Her father is Afghan and Russian and her mother is Filipino/Chinese with Black indigenous roots. Khan now works out of Indianapolis, Indiana where she is an artist and member of the Looking Glass Alliance at the Indianapolis Museum of Art.

== Early life ==
Until the age of nine, Khan was raised on an international school campus in Dakar, Senegal where her parents taught. Her family later relocated to Jakarta, Indonesia before she was sent to an American boarding school in Java.

== Career ==
In 2020, Khan received one of her first paid art commissions. This commission was part of an initiative in conjunction with the Arts Council of Indianapolis, St’ArtUp 317, and PATTERN magazine, and it consisted of a mural painted by Khan that illustrated poems by Indianapolis-based poets Malachi Carter and Manon Voice. The mural was titled "Mother & Child / Breathe" and was located on 415 Massachusetts Avenue.

In 2023, Khan joined up with fellow community leaders Kyng Rhodes, Tatjana Rebelle, Jordan Ryan, and Bobby Young to form the Indianapolis Museum of Art's (IMA) Looking Glass Alliance. The group was brought on to help curate the new American galleries at the museum and to aid the institution in expanding upon the traditionally featured version of the American experience commonly found in museums. Nasreen Khan's contribution to the gallery included two works of art that she created and loaned to the IMA. "Keep Your Head Down," a blank white canvas, was contributed by Khan in order to represent the lack of diversity within the IMA's collection. Khan also included her oil on wood painting titled "Anchor, Baby" as a statement on immigrant motherhood.

Khan applied for a Public Art for Neighborhoods grant in 2021 through the Indy Arts Council. She received a $2,500 grant to paint a mural in the Haughville branch of the Indianapolis Public Library that would highlight the neighborhood's history, notable people, and buildings. The mural included a portrait of local community leader Lucius Newsom as well as depictions of the local Haughville landmarks of the Westside Bait & Tackle Shop and the Holy Trinity Church.

In October 2024, the Harrison Center's Sky Gallery displayed Khan's artwork in a show titled "Sourcecode". The show included AI images inspired by the Pashtun landay poetry form as well as artwork made by Khan from burned, carved, and painted wood.

== Awards and fellowships ==
- Creative Renewal Arts Fellowship
- Midwest Arts Writers Fellowship Runner-Up
