= Ashley Nora =

American artist

- Born: Laurel, Mississippi
- Education: Anderson University
- Known for: "Tell Me Heaven Aint Black" series, Black Lives Matter street mural, "Keepers of Culture" and "Nobuhle"
- Website: ashleynoraart.com

Ashley Nora is a contemporary American multidisciplinary visual artist born in Laurel, Mississippi whose paintings, murals, and sculptural works reimagine classical iconography through a contemporary Black lens. Known for her signature blue and white palette, Nora creates powerful portraits that explore divinity, identity, legacy, and belonging. She transitioned from a career in analytical chemistry to full time art, boldly pursuing a vision centered on possibility and generational transformation. Her work has been exhibited in galleries and institutions nationwide and includes major public installations and institutional commissions. Nora is the creator of the ongoing series Tell Me Heaven Ain’t Black, a body of work that challenges historical depictions of the sacred by centering Black figures within celestial, regal, and eternal narratives. Through intimate portraiture and monumental scale alike, her practice transforms ordinary presence into divine inheritance.

She is also known for her murals surrounding the Indianapolis area including the Black Lives Matter mural and her "Keepers of Culture" mural, both of which are on the historic Indiana Avenue. Nora is the CEO of her Indiana-based company, Ashely Nora Art LLC, and is acting vice president of the Eighteen Art Collective.

== Career ==
Nora graduated from Anderson University in 2012 and began her career as an analytical chemist. In 2019 she left the field to pursue being an artist. This theme of "following dreams" can be seen throughout Nora's artistic career, starting with the mural that became the artist's big break, "Keepers of Culture". In 2021 Alan Bacon and Malina Jeffers, co-founders of GANGGANG, brought Nora in to create a mural for BUTTER, their annual art fair. The mural was painted in the 200 block of 11th Street on the wall of the Stutz Building, honoring eight iconic Black Indiana natives in 3D style portraiture. In an interview with FOX59 News, Nora mentions that "Keepers of Culture" was meant to be a thank you to the eight Black Indiana icons featured for not giving up on their dreams.

Nora's focus on following dreams is also featured in her February 2023 painting "I Know I Can". This painting was created live by Nora during a Pacers basketball game for one of the team's Black History Month activities. According to Nora, the painting depicted "children who have dreams but no resources," including three kids who dream of their future careers and work towards them with their limited materials. This painting was auctioned off and all of the proceeds went to the Pacers Foundation.

Dreams have also inspired some of her other works. When Nora participated in the Jiffy Lube Mural Project, she created a piece titled "Into Existence". This work was inspired by one of Nora's own dreams in which she envisioned the color palate and glitchy style she used for the mural.

Nora's two daughters have been the subject of multiple pieces by the artist including "Soaring Possibilities". This mural was displayed at Indianapolis's Monument Circle when the city hosted March Madness in 2021. Nora described this piece as being representative of her children's imagination going wild while they "created their own reality" though play. Depictions of the artist's children can also be found on the Indiana Avenue Black Lives Matter mural. Nora was designated to paint the letter "R" for this street mural in August 2020. Within the boundaries of her letter she painted her two young daughters inside of fists, including their dream jobs written out under their portraits. The eighteen artists who participated in this mural would later become known as the Eighteen Collective.

Nora continued to collaborate with the Collective on multiple projects, including an exhibit titled "We. The Culture", displayed in the Indianapolis Museum of Art at Newfields. To the Collective, this gallery was meant to represent changes to the art sectors of Indianapolis as they become more welcoming to the Black talent that has gone unrepresented in the past. The piece that Nora chose to have included in the gallery, "Nobuhle", was the first painting the artist created after her trip to the Kingdom of Eswatini. "Nobuhle," which translates to "mother of beauty," is an oil painting that depicts a black woman as the main subject introducing her new body of work now in "blue".

Ashley Nora's practice currently reimagines classical European religious imagery through a distinctly Black, contemporary lens, asserting the sacred presence of Black figures within visual histories that have long excluded them. Working in oil and sculpture, she constructs celestial, blue toned compositions where halos, florals, and divine light function as both aesthetic language and symbolic reclamation. Rooted in her ongoing series Tell Me Heaven Ain’t Black, her work challenges inherited narratives of divinity, offering a vision of heaven that is expansive, inclusive, and intimately personal. Through recurring motifs of the “haloed” figure, Nora invites viewers to confront their own perceptions of worth, identity, and spiritual inheritance. Her work ultimately insists that divinity is not distant, but embodied. Present within us, regardless of circumstance.

== Influences ==
Art and painting were often a refuge for Nora while growing up in Mississippi. She used her art as an escape from the "traumatic" environment, even expressing that it had "saved her life." Nora would find rocks to form into little sculptures with a screwdriver, all for the purpose of creating something new with the limited resources that were provided to her. The artist has said that her biggest artistic inspiration has been Black joy, especially the joy experienced by children due to its adulteration and purity. Nora used art in her own past, going all the way back to her childhood, to connect with joy during unjoyful times.

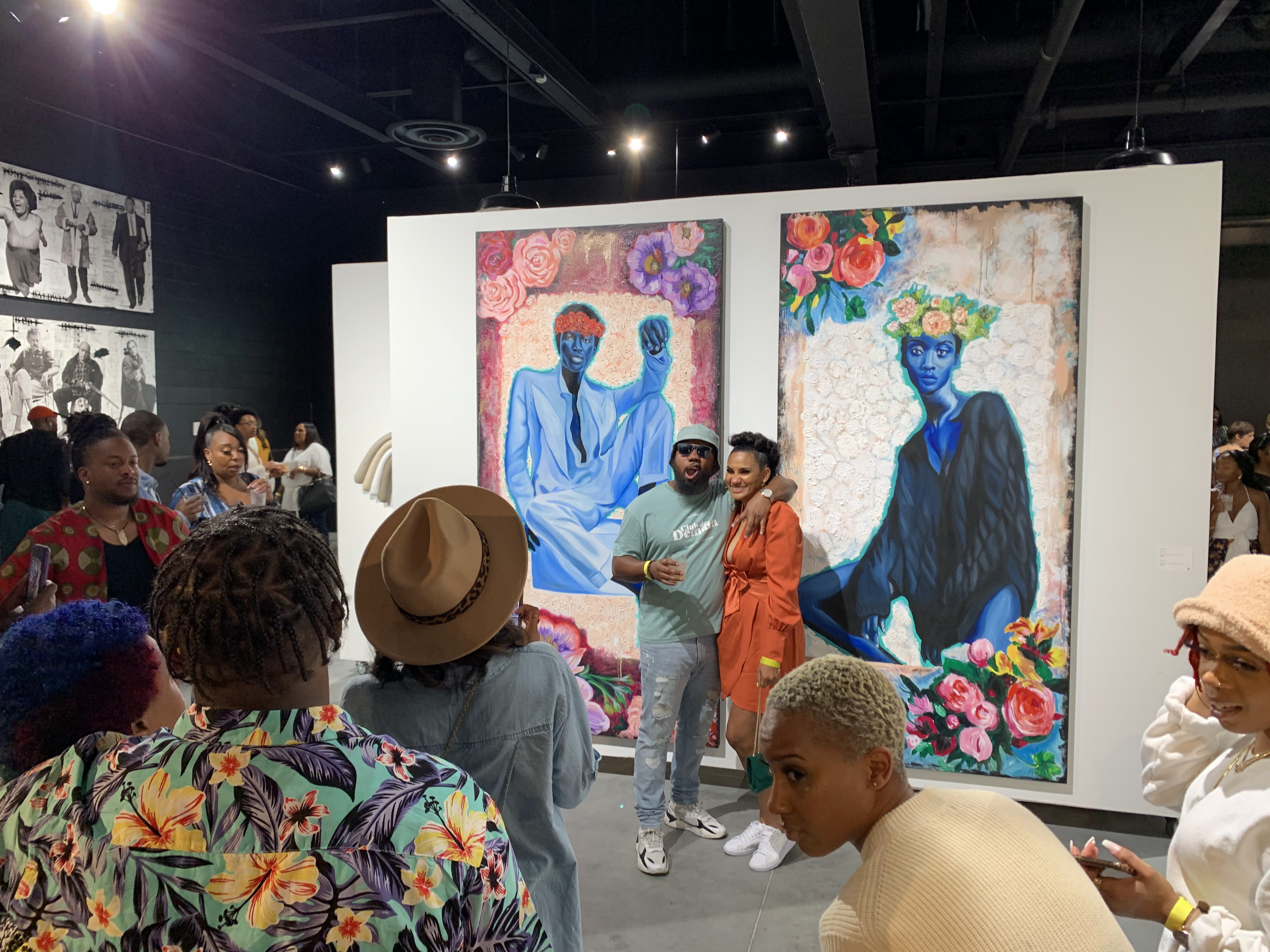
Ashley Nora at the BUTTER art fair standing with two of the pieces she painted inspired by her trip to Eswatini

Nora has done several murals throughout her career. Her inspiration behind frequenting this form of art also lies in her childhood. In an interview with Newfields Nora mentioned that, as a kid, she only lived five minutes away from the Lauren Rogers Museum of Art, but that she did not have the money to go inside. Instead, the pieces of art she had access to were the murals around her hometown.

Later in her career, Nora was hired on to create a mural for an orphanage in Eswatini. Here she had the chance experience being Black in Black spaces where she no long had to feel like a minority. This experience was reflected in the series of paintings Nora created to depict Black people in white space. The people she painted for this series all have skin painted in blue hues, which is the color that Nora felt radiated off of the people she met in Eswatini.
