= Ganggang =

Cultural development firm based in Indianapolis, Indiana, US

GANGGANG

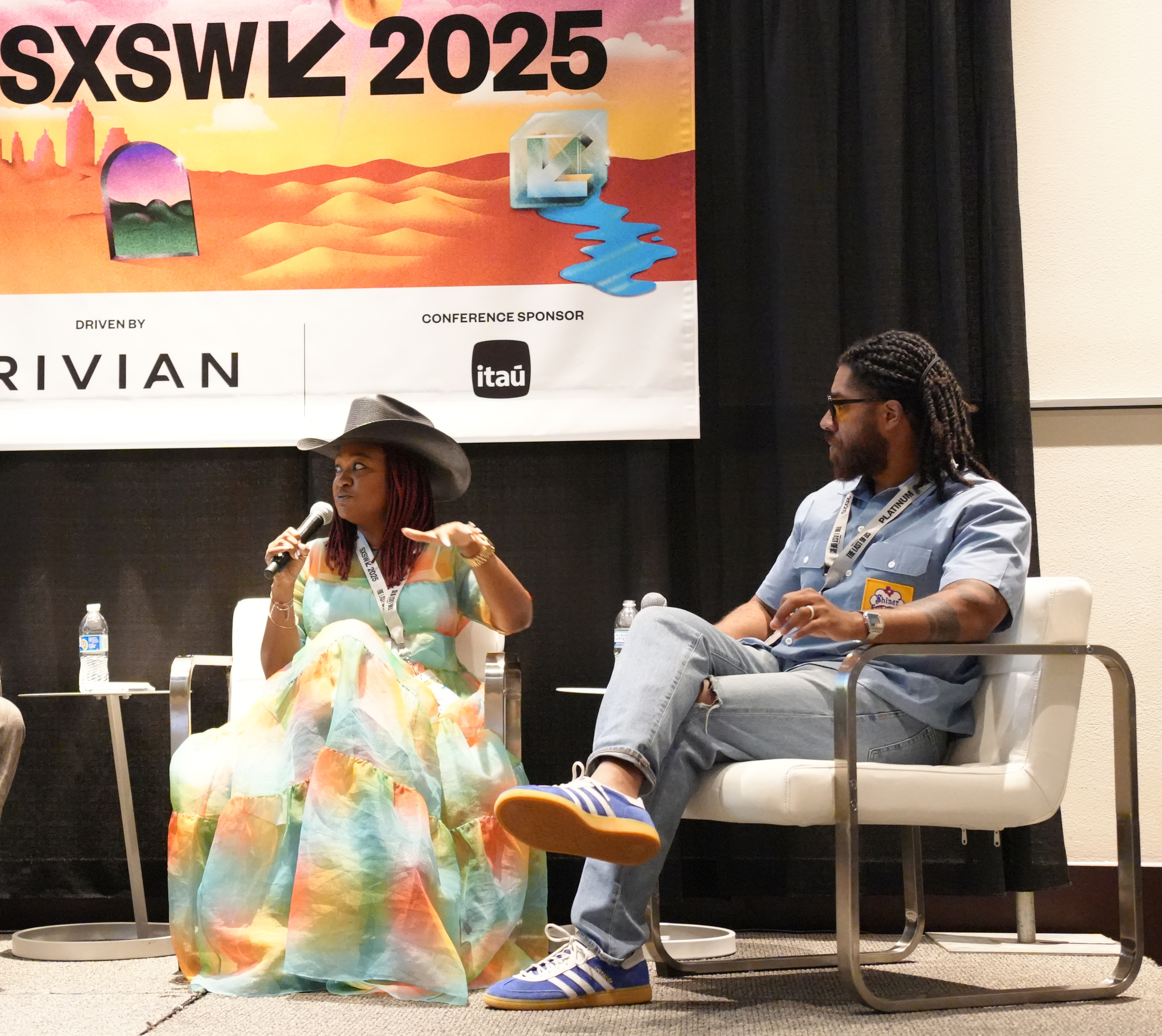
- Malina Simone Jeffers & Alan Bacon at SXSW 2025
- Formation: Late 2020
- Founders: Alan Bacon, Malina Simone Jeffers
- Region served: Indianapolis, US
- Website: ganggangculture.com

Ganggang (stylized in all caps) is an American cultural development and social justice organization. Founded by spouses and business partners Alan Bacon and Malina "Mali" Simone Jeffers in late 2020, Ganggang works to showcase and financially support Black visual artists and their work. Their efforts have included organizing artist collectives, fine art fairs, a curated exhibition at the Indianapolis Museum of Art at Newfields, and live performances.

== History ==
Jeffers named the firm Ganggang in Indianapolis to celebrate the real meaning of "gang", "to go on a journey" and dismiss the use of the term to criminalize groups of black men. From June to August 2020, Malina "Mali" Jeffers and Alan Bacon helped coordinate eighteen artists who painted a Black Lives Matter street mural in Indianapolis on Indiana Avenue during the peak of the George Floyd protests. The group of artists became known as "The Eighteen Art Collective". At the time, Bacon was working at United Way of Central Indiana, and Jeffers had just left a position as vice president of marketing at an Indianapolis property group. Ganggang officially formed in November 2020.

During the 2021 NCAA Division I men's basketball tournament in March, Ganggang organized art fairs and performances by hundreds of dancers, musicians, and spoken word artists. The three-week event, called Swish, was a partnership with the Arts Council of Indianapolis and the Indianapolis Cultural Trail.

In November 2021, Ganggang planned to curate an exhibition featuring The Eighteen Art Collective at the Indianapolis Museum of Art at Newfields, where Jeffers is on the board of governors. However, after controversies at the museum involving the museum's president and CEO at the time, Charles L. Venable, Ganggang pulled out of the show. A year after the resignation of Venable, as well as continued efforts by the museum to better its relationship with the Indianapolis community, Ganggang acted as guest curators for an expanded version of the originally planned Newfields exhibition, now titled "We. The Culture."

Throughout 2021 and 2022, Ganggang sponsored a number of public events, including a free concert series outside Clowes Memorial Hall and "BLACK: A Festival of Joy". They also commissioned murals, including one by Indianapolis artist Ashley Nora on The Stutz (a renovated building previously owned by Stutz Motor Company) and one by Amiah Mims in Marathon Health's office in Carmel, Indiana.

In March 2022, Ganggang partnered with IndyGo, with the two companies sharing space in a former Key Bank building.

== Butter Fine Art Fair ==
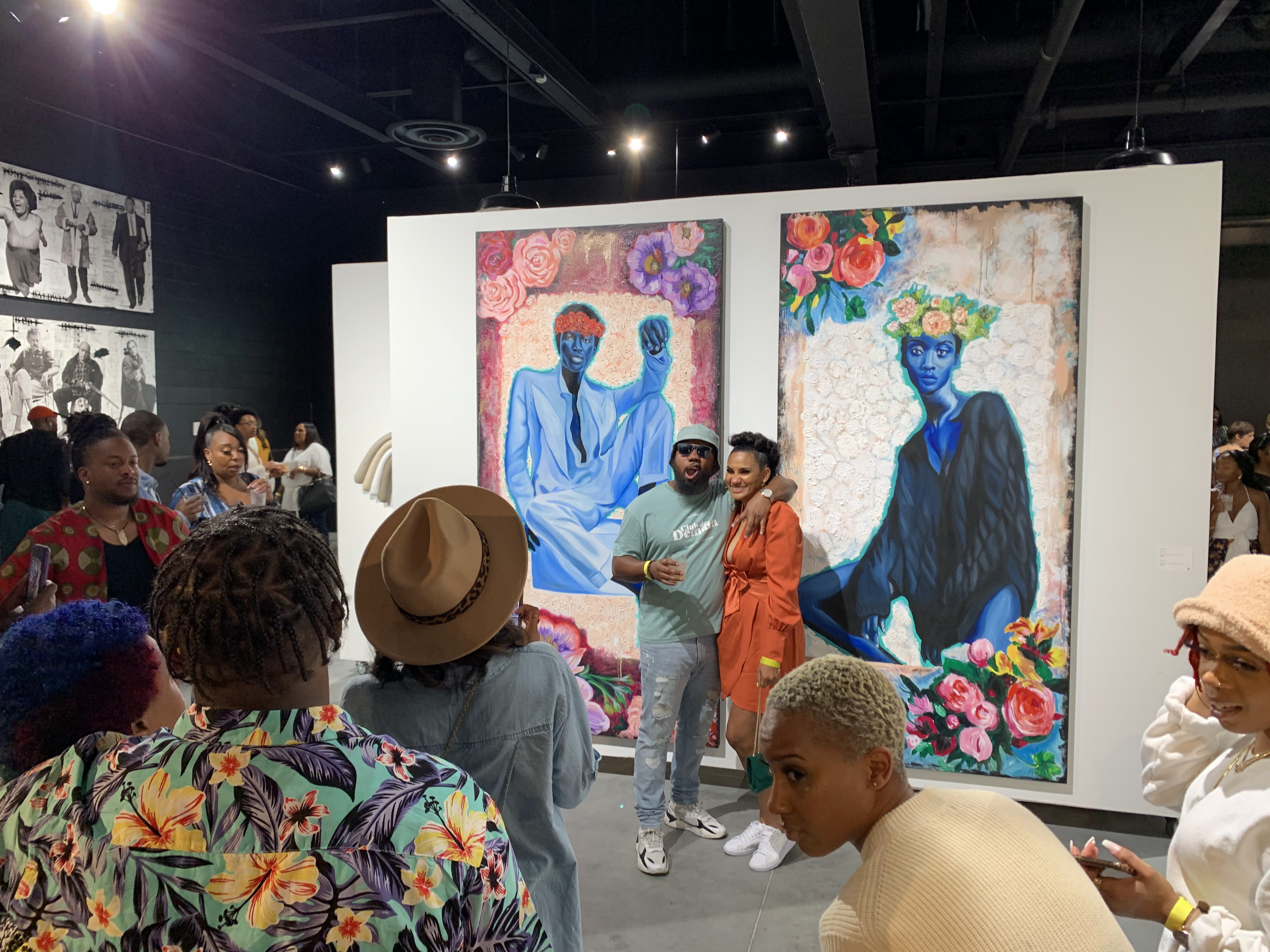
Artist Ashley Nora posing in front of her art at the BUTTER 2 art fair

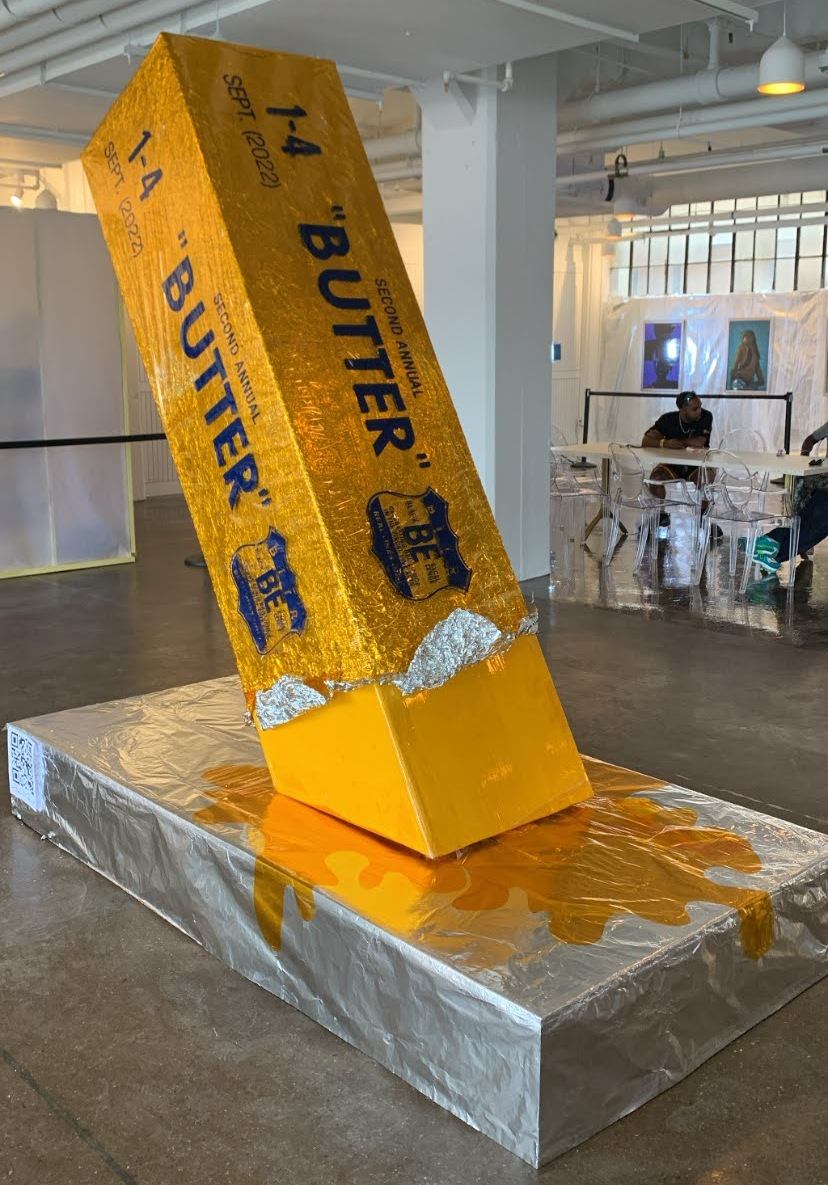
A sculpture of a stick of butter at the BUTTER 2 art fair

In 2021, Ganggang created the Butter fine art fair (stylized BUTTER), a multi-day art exhibition that takes place over Labor Day weekend at The Stutz building in downtown Indianapolis. The first Butter resulted in the sale of 42 pieces of art totaling $65,000, with more sales resulting after the fair. Artists were not charged a fee to take part in the exhibition, and were not charged a commission on sales.

The second iteration of Butter, called BUTTER 2, took place over four days in September 2022, with triple the physical size. The fair included the addition of a dance party on Saturday night called "Melt", several live performances, a merchandise store, and walking tours from Indianapolis historian Sampson Levingston. The four-member curation team was composed of Bacon, Jeffers, former executive director of the Indianapolis Contemporary Braydee Euliss, and former Indianapolis Museum of Art curator and The Art Assignment creator Sarah Urist Green. The exhibition resulted in over $250,000 in art sales. In a November 2022 article discussing Butter and Ganggang's role in the evolution of the Indianapolis art scene, The New York Times stated that Ganggang, despite being "barely two years old, [... was] already finding its way into the national art scene, elevating artists of color, maximizing their earnings by giving them all the profit for their work, and proving that Indianapolis is more than a sports city."

The fair returned again in 2023, raising nearly $300,000 in sales.

The annual fair's 2024 line-up included notable artists such as Cornelius Tulloch, April Bey, and D. Del Reverda Jennings. In total, there were about 60 artists that showcased over 150 works. This was the first year that Butter included a kids' zone for youth to be creative at the event.

In 2025, Ganggang included an I Made Rock 'N' Roll activation at Butter called "Ju’s Juke Joint", and it featured live music for the purpose of celebrating Black musical heritage as well as local juke joints. The Alan Mills’ Best in Show award was also added to the 2025 fair. This award would provide a $5,000 cash prize to an artist selected by a group of curators on the preview night. The 2025 Butter included the largest amount of work thus far in the fair's five years of running and had prices ranging from $250 to hundreds of thousands of dollars. The fair surpassed the previous year's art sales in two days after reaching $143,000 in sales. Indianapolis Pacers player Tyrese Haliburton contributed to $15,000 worth of these sales.

After the fifth fair in 2025, Butter surpassed $1 million in sales since its creation in 2021.

=== BUTTER at Indy’s Home Court ===
In 2024, Ganggang partnered with the Indy Arts Council and the Indiana Humanities to curate a weekend of art activations in downtown Indianapolis leading up to the 2024 NBA All-Star game. For their part, Ganggang organized a pop-up version of the Butter Art Fair to take place from February 16, 2024, to February 18, 2024. This "Butter at Indy's Home Court" was held at the Indianapolis Artsgarden and included more than 30 artists utilizing a variety of media to bridge the gap between sports and culture. Programming for the art fair also included "Creative Summits" made up of artist talks and activities. The curators for "Butter at Indy's Home Court" included Deonna Craig, Kia Davis, and Alan Mills.

The financing for the art activations curated for the 2024 NBA All-Star game was helped along by a $1.5 million grant from the Lilly Endowment.

== I Made Rock ‘N’ Roll Festival ==
In 2024, Ganggang organized the "I Made Rock 'N' Roll Festival", Indiana's largest Black rock and roll festival. The purpose behind the event is to recognize the historical contributions of Black people in the development of rock and roll as well as other music genres while bringing the community together. The first "I Made Rock 'N' Roll Festival" thrown by Ganggang was held on May 18, 2024, at Indy's downtown American Legion Mall. The festival featured Janelle Monáe, Gary Clark Jr., Robert Randolph Band, Joy Oladokun and more.

In 2023, Alan Bacon mentioned in an interview with WFYI that Ganggang planned to make the "I Made Rock 'N' Roll Festival" a recurring event in Indianapolis.

== Funding and governance ==
Ganggang officially formed in November 2020 with $250,000 in initial seed money. The organization's primary benefactor is the Central Indiana Community Foundation. Bacon and Jeffers, a married couple, run the firm alongside a board of directors that include former Indianapolis Colt Gary Brackett and A'Lelia Bundles, who is the great-great-granddaughter of Madam C. J. Walker.

Ganggang contains elements of both a non-profit and for-profit enterprise. The not-for-profit side develops programming related to their goals and the for-profit side invests in cultural entrepreneurs. Jeffers explained to Indianapolis Monthly in a February 2021 interview, "We are wanting to support those who, by tradition, aren't recognized by arts organizations. It's not easy to find support, especially if you are a cultural entrepreneur. You can't find funding if you are a for-profit entity, and we shouldn't have to force artists to become a not-for-profit to receive funding."
