= Charles Venable =

Charles Venable may refer to:

- Charles L. Venable (born 1960), former CEO of the Indianapolis Museum of Art in Indianapolis, Indiana
- Charles S. Venable (1827–1900), mathematician, astronomer, and military officer
