= Courtney McClellan =

American interdisciplinary artist

- Occupation: Interdisciplinary artist

Courtney McClellan is an American interdisciplinary artist.

== Early life and education ==
Courtney McClellan is from Greensboro, North Carolina. Her father is a criminal defense attorney, and her mother is a school teacher.

McClellan earned her B.A. in Studio Art and Journalism and Mass Communications from the University of North Carolina at Chapel Hill in 2008. In 2013, she earned her M.F.A. from Tufts University and the School of the Museum of Fine Arts, Boston.

== Career ==
From 2013 to 2014, McClellan was the Fountainhead Fellow in the Sculpture and Extended Media Department at Virginia Commonwealth University. From 2015 to 2017, she was the Sculpture Fellow at the University of Georgia. From 2017 to 2018, she was a Museum of Fine Arts Boston Traveling Fellow.

McClellan has been an artist in residence at the Hambidge Center, Wassaic Projects, MacDowell, the Library of Congress and Yaddo.

From 2019 to 2020, McClellan was a Working Artist Project Fellow at the Museum of Contemporary Art of Georgia. She also currently serves as a Visiting Assistant Professor at the University of Georgia in Athens.

Her work incorporates elements of sculpture, performance, photography, and video.

In March 2023, McClellan was named Interim Editor of Burnaway, a journal of Contemporary Art from the American South and its diaspora.

=== Witness Lab ===
Courtney McClellan was named the 2019-2020 Roman J. Witt Artist in Residence at the Penny W. Stamps School of Art & Design.

In early 2020, she launched the exhibition Witness Lab at the University of Michigan Museum of Art. The exhibition was "a courtroom installation and a performance series . . . The gallery collapses courtroom, theater, classroom, laboratory, and artist studio in order to study the relationship between performance and law. In hosting mock trials, court transcript readings, and trial advocacy workshops, the artist investigates who performs the role of witness in our society and how that understanding may map onto the narrower legal definition of the role." Another event included U-M students performing trial scenes from Shakespeare.

Due to the COVID-19 pandemic, the exhibition closed down early when the museum closed to the public in mid-March 2020. Later in the year, the museum repurposed the courtroom furniture to create a satellite city clerk's office in use for the 2020 presidential election.
