= Malina Simone Jeffers =

American community organizer

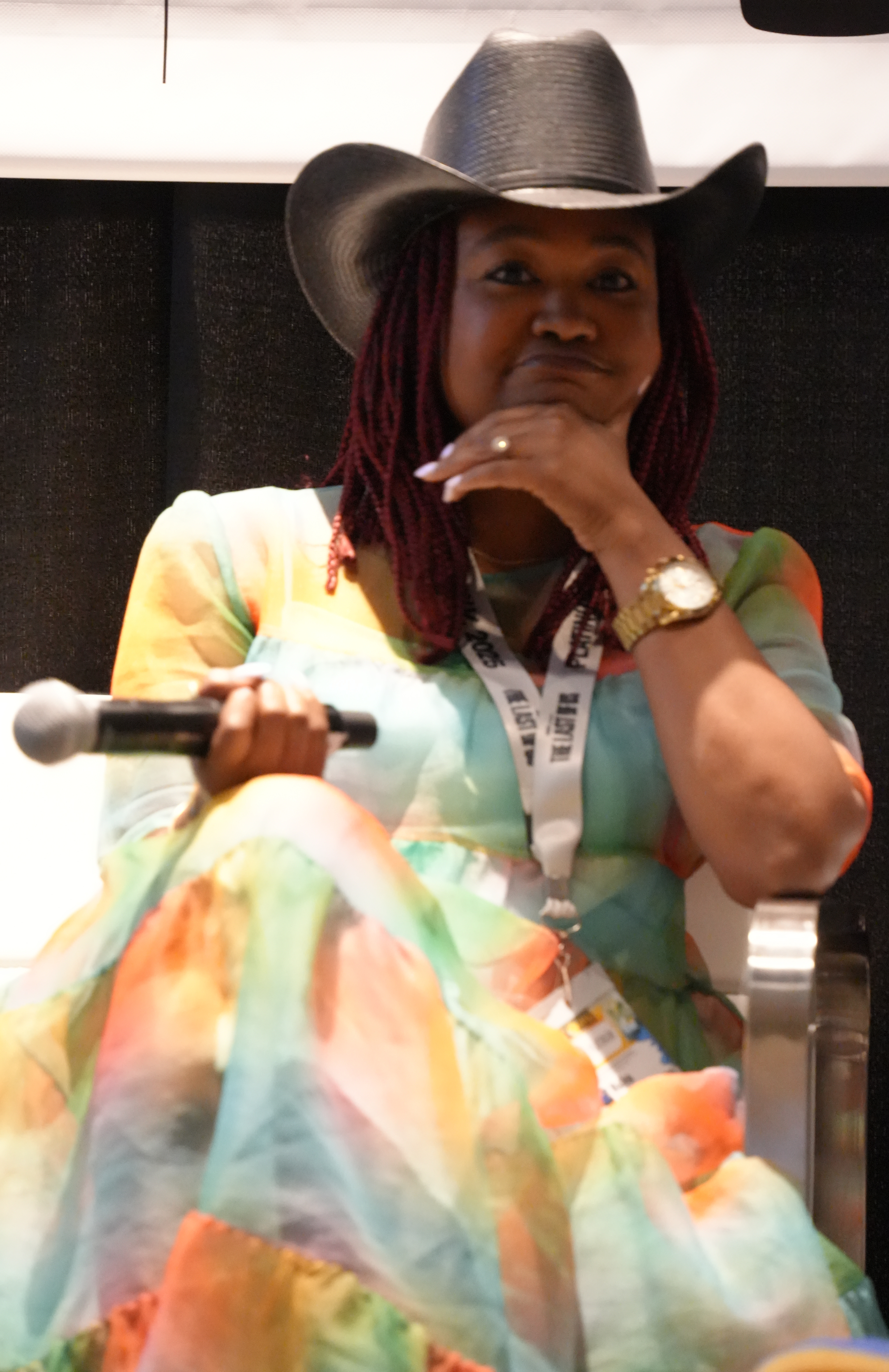
- Jeffers at SXSW 2025
- Born: 1982 (age 43–44); Indianapolis, IN
- Other name: Mali
- Education: Ball State University
- Organization: GANGGANG
- Known for: Co-founder of GANGGANG and BUTTER fine art fair
- Website: https://www.malinasimone.com/about

Malina "Mali" Simone Jeffers (born 1982) co-organized the Black Lives Matter street mural (Indianapolis) and is a co-founder of Ganggang (stylized GANGGANG) and Butter (stylized BUTTER) fine art fair.

== Early life ==
Malina Simone Jeffers is a native of Indianapolis, Indiana and graduated from Ball State University in 2004 where she studied advertising and photography. She is a graduate of the Stanley K. Lacy Leadership Series. Jeffers' spouse and business partner is Alan Bacon, they met in 2014 in Nashville, Tennessee.

== Career ==
After graduating, Jeffers returned to Indianapolis to focus on making the city more culturally attractive and began by organizing a series of local performance art events. She started her career at Emmis Communications in radio sales. Jeffers worked at the Arts Council of Indianapolis; while there she coordinated public art exhibitions in downtown Indianapolis and organized a project to put live poetry on Indianapolis buses. She went on to serve as the director of marketing at the Madame C.J. Walker Legacy Center, where she developed branding and programs about historic Indiana Avenue and the city of Indianapolis. In 2013, Jeffers founded Mosaic City, an organization addressing diversity, equity and inclusion. She led corporate responsibility, marketing, and community engagement efforts for Waterside, the largest urban re-development project in downtown Indianapolis' history. Jeffers has previously worked as an independent contractor on Plan 2020, the city of Indianapolis' bicentennial plan.

=== GANGGANG and BUTTER fine art fair ===
Ganggang is a nonprofit cultural development firm for creatives and people of culture based in Indianapolis. They promote racial justice by investing in Black artists and creatives. It was formed officially in November 2020 by Jeffers and her partner, Alan Bacon. Previously, from June to August 2020, Bacon and Jeffers coordinated the eighteen artists who painted the Black Lives Matter street mural on Indiana Avenue in Indianapolis during the George Floyd protests. This group of artists became known as "The Eighteen Art Collective". In 2021, Ganggang organized art fairs and performances by more than 500 spoken word artists, musicians, and dancers for a three-week event called Swish for the NCAA Division I men's basketball tournament. Swish was organized in partnership with the Indianapolis Cultural Trail and the Arts Council of Indianapolis.

The firm planned a curated exhibition featuring The Eighteen Art Collective at Indianapolis Museum of Art at Newfields in Indianapolis. However, after controversies involving the museum's president and CEO at the time, Charles L. Venable, Ganggang pulled out. After the resignation of Venable, and efforts by the museum to better their relationship with the local community, Ganggang put together an expanded version of the original exhibition, called "We. The Culture."

In 2021, Ganggang created the Butter fine art fair, a multi-day art fair and exhibition that takes place at The Stutz building over Labor Day weekend in downtown Indianapolis. The artists participating are not charged an exhibition fee, or a commission on sales. The 2021 Butter fine art fair resulted in the sale of 42 art pieces and more after the fair.

== Honors and membership ==
- Emerging Leaders Award from 100 Black Men of Indianapolis, 2013
- 40 under Forty recipient from Indianapolis Business Journal, 2016
- Jeffers serves on the Board of Directors/Governors for Big Car, Indianapolis Neighborhood Housing Agency, and Newfields
- She serves on The Exchange of Indianapolis Urban League
- The 2023 Ovid Butler Founder's Award Recipient
- The 2024 Trailblazing Award
