= Burnaway =

American arts magazine

- Editor: Courtney McClellan
- Executive Director: Brandon Sheats
- Former editors: Jeremy Abernathy (2008–2013); Stephanie Cash (2013–2018); Logan Lockner (2018–2020); Jasmine Amussen (2020–2023)
- Categories: Contemporary art, art criticism
- Frequency: Weekly (online); annually (print)
- Founder: Susannah Darrow, Jeremy Abernathy
- First issue: 2008
- Company: Burnaway, Inc.
- Country: United States
- Based in: Atlanta, Georgia
- Language: English
- Website: burnaway.org

Burnaway (occasionally stylized in all caps as BURNAWAY) is an American nonprofit magazine of contemporary art and criticism based in Atlanta, Georgia. It covers visual art from the American South and the Caribbean, primarily publishing online.

The magazine publishes exhibition reviews, essays, interviews, and studio visits. It also runs the Art Writing Incubator, a training program for emerging art critics, and publishes The Burnaway Reader, an annual print edition.

Burnaway was founded in 2008, at a moment when the Great Recession led to a substantial decline in professional arts criticism roles. Initially dedicated to Atlanta's contemporary art scene, the magazine expanded its coverage to other cities in the South in 2013. It has received grants from the Andy Warhol Foundation for the Visual Arts and the Dorothea and Leo Rabkin Foundation.

== History ==
Burnaway was founded in 2008 by Susannah Darrow, its first executive director, and Jeremy Abernathy, its first editor-in-chief. It was established in response to layoffs at the Atlanta Journal-Constitution’s culture section and the elimination of art critic staff roles at other publications. The magazine began publishing annual print editions in 2013, beginning with Interior (edited by Rachel Reese).

During the COVID-19 pandemic in 2020, Burnaway was one of nine nonprofit art journals (alongside BOMB, The Brooklyn Rail, and the New Art Examiner) to receive a $20,000 grant from the Rabkin Foundation.

In 2024, the magazine appointed editors-at-large for Houston, the Carolinas, and the Caribbean, joining an existing New Orleans editor-at-large, and extended its coverage to the Caribbean. It began a year-long co-publishing partnership with the Oxford American in 2025.

== Art Writing Incubator ==
The magazine has hosted programming for writers since its early years, including a critics-in-residence program and a mentorship program. Its current program, the Art Writing Incubator (AWrI), is a four-week online intensive in which participants develop a long-form writing project with Burnaway's editors and attend sessions held by established culture writers, artists, and curators.

The 2021 edition of AWrI included a public keynote lecture by artist Paul Chan, and the 2022 edition included one by the novelist Maaza Mengiste. In 2026, poet Nikky Finney delivered a public lecture for the AWrI.

== See also ==
- List of art magazines
