= M Ensemble Company =

African American theater in Florida

The M Ensemble Company is the oldest operating African American theatre company in Florida and has been serving the Miami-Dade County community for more than 45 years. The company has tackled an eclectic mix of theatre performances including musicals and contemporary, classical and original plays. M Ensemble also consistently facilitates theater workshops for children and adults and presentations for Kwanzaa and Black Music Month.

The M Ensemble was established by T.G. Cooper in 1971, but has been led by co-founders Shirley Richardson & Pat Williams for almost the entirety of its existence. In its first 35 years, M Ensemble produced over 150 plays. The company has been classified as an emerging Major Cultural Institution by the Miami-Dade Cultural Affairs Council.

== Mission statement ==
According to M Ensemble's website, the company's mission has always been "to promote African-American culture and experiences through the performing arts."

== History ==
M Ensemble was established at the University of Miami by T.G. Cooper. Cooper established a business model approach to running the theatre company, a legacy that has had a significant impact on the company's longevity. Within the year, the founder relocated to Washington D.C. where he became the chair of the Howard University Department of Theatre Arts. Volunteers Patricia Williams and Shirley Richardson began running M Ensemble in 1972. For many years, the company did not have a permanent building to use for rehearsals and performances. Instead, they used temporary spaces in various locations in North Miami, Wynwood, Overtown, South Dade and Liberty City.

M Ensemble is funded through Miami-Dade County Cultural Affairs, Funding Arts Network, State of Florida Arts Council, Knight Foundation, and the Miami Salon Group, as well as loyal patrons who have donated money and volunteer hours.

As a team, Williams and Richardson have dedicated their lives to M Ensemble's success, "choosing plays, building scenery, loaning props from their own homes & supporting their passions by taking second jobs. Over the years, they have raised money with everything from bake sales to grants from Florida Arts and the National Endowment for the Arts." Even though recent annual budgets have been "between $250,000 and $300,000," the M Ensemble suffered fiscal setbacks from 2010 to 2012 with about $30,000 in debt according to IRS filings from those years.

In October 2016, M Ensemble celebrated the opening of their permanent location at The Sandrell Rivers Black Box Theater. According to Williams and Richardson, “as a residential company in a new permanent space MEC is expected to thrive in years to come as we continue to entertain and educate. Perhaps those who have never seen an M Ensemble Company production will be inspired to attend and may leave wanting more!”

=== Founders ===
Theodore G. Cooper, deceased at the age of 57, was a producer, director, educator, writer, actor and with his former wife, Grace C. Cooper, founder of The M Ensemble Company. He preferred to be called “T.G.” and was a professor of drama at Howard University for twenty years and the chair of the department. Fellow professor of theater arts and close friend, Henri Edmonds, described him as, "Mr. Black Theater...He was just a ball of energy, always with so many ideas about how to perpetuate black theater." Cooper had started theater companies in Miami & Annapolis in addition to writing novels, plays, and even a college textbook on theater. Before his passing, "he had preached the importance of African Americans gaining control on the business side of theater in America, because that was the only way to guarantee that plays by young black playwrights would be produced. Toward that end, he designed and taught courses in theater administration."

Patricia E. Williams is the co-founder, associate producer, general manager, & occasional stage manager of M Ensemble. Williams is an active member of the Screen Actors Guild and Actor's Equity. Williams holds full-time positions in addition to leading M Ensemble, include being director of the after school program at The YWCA of Greater Miami. According to her bio on the M Ensemble website, "her appearances include the M Ensemble productions; Black Spirit Ritual, Hansel and Gretel, and El Hall Malik Shabazz." She worked with off-Broadway and regional theaters while she was in New York & New Jersey. Williams holds a bachelor's degree in theater and journalism from Northwestern University.

Shirley Richardson is the co-founder and executive director of M Ensemble. Richardson has also directed and performed in many of the company's productions. Like Williams, she held another job outside of M Ensemble as the Program Director at the Concept Health Systems Outpatient Treatment Center. Her degrees include a Bachelor of Fine Arts from the University of Miami and a master's degree in Mental Health Counseling from Nova Southeastern University. Richardson first became interested in theater at the age of 16 while watching Liza Minnelli perform in “The Fantasticks” at the Coconut Grove Playhouse, where she regularly helped her mother clean up after white audiences left performances.

== Past Productions ==
M Ensemble has always had an "eclectic bill of fare that has included “funky” musicals like Fats Waller’s Ain't Misbehavin' (musical), dramas with a comedic edge, such as Lonnie Elder III’s Ceremonies in Dark Old Men; and gospel songfests, like Langston Hughes’s Tambourines to Glory or Lanie Robertson’s biographical cabaret treatment of Billie Holiday’s last days in Last Day at Emerson’s Bar & Grill."

Other notable past productions include:

- Our Short Stay (the original production) by Barbara & Carlton Molette in 2015 at the African Heritage Cultural Center in Miami, FL
- Harlem Duet by Djanet Sears during the 2012 season
- Fences by August Wilson in 2016, though M Ensemble had already "completed all 10 of the career-making plays of Wilson’s Pittsburgh Cycle— before, first staging the play at the Bakehouse Art Complex in 1990."

== Accomplishments & Awards ==
=== Company Accomplishments ===
One year after M Ensemble's establishment, M Ensemble represented the Southern region of the United States at the World Festival for Black Arts in Lagos, Nigeria in 1972.

The company also performed Jackie Moms Mabley, Live in the National Black Theatre Festival in Winston-Salem NC in 1995 & 1997. According to the M Ensemble website, this performance "received rave reviews from the Winston-Salem Press and national exposure in the New York Times and Jet Magazine.

=== Awards ===
M Ensemble has received positive critical reception and awards throughout its history, including Bill Hirschman’s 2016 review for the presentation of Fences by August Wilson and was a 2016 Knight Arts Challenge grant finalist.

2015 George Abbot Award for Outstanding Achievement in the Arts presented to Shirley Richardson and Patricia E. Williams.

- This award is sponsored by the Carbonell Awards, South Florida’s Theatre & Arts Honors. "This is awarded to an individual (or team) who has contributed significantly to the artistic and cultural development of the region."

2008 Silver Palm Award for M Ensemble's Outstanding Ensemble of Actors of From the Mississippi Delta.

== Community Outreach ==
M Ensemble collaborates with the YWCA of Greater Miami to conduct theater workshops and provides training in technical theater as well as a theater workshop to the North Miami Senior High Drama Club.

The following are community outreach initiatives that M Ensemble has engaged in since its inception:

- co-founded the Southern Black Cultural Alliance comprising 30 African-American theatre and other cultural organizations
- pioneered the country's first drama workshop for the blind and visually disabled children in 1977
- implemented the country's first drama program for youths in juvenile detention centers
- co-founded the Diaspora Arts coalition in Miami-Dade County

M’Ensemble's Children's Theatre

According to the M Ensemble website, "Ensemble’s Children’s Theatre offers children and youth the unique opportunity to experience drama. It provides them with an alternative to sports and encourages their artistic and creative abilities. It’s also a wonderful positive outlet that helps many children overcome shyness and become more secure...Any student 4- 16 can participate as long as they have a keen interest in the arts, creativity, and a desire to have fun."

Creative activities at the Children's Theatre include:

- arts and crafts
- dance
- costume and make-up
- improvisation
- movement and dance
- play production

The website promises that these "fun-filled artistic activities" will help children develop:

- a better understanding of their feelings
- skills to work with others
- ability to use one's creative side
- a sound body
