= Elisa Turner =

- Born: 1952; New York City, New York
- Education: DePauw University; University of North Carolina at Chapel Hill
- Occupation: Art critic
- Writing career
- Notable awards: Florida Book Awards, Gold Medal Visual Arts, 2025; Rabkin Prize, 2020
- Website: elisaturner.com

Elisa Turner (born 1952) is an American journalist and art critic, with a focus on international visual arts. She was the primary art critic at the Miami Herald from 1995 to 2007, and won the Rabkin Prize in 2020.

== Biography ==
Elisa Turner was born in New York in 1952. Shortly after her birth, her family moved to Shelbyville, Illinois, where she grew up. She graduated with a B.A. in English from DePauw University and an M.A. in comparative literature from the University of North Carolina at Chapel Hill.

Turner's art journalism career for the Miami Herald newspaper began in 1986, and she was the Herald's primary art critic from 1995 to 2007.

As Miami correspondent for ARTnews magazine (1984–2014), she contributed reviews, news reports and feature stories for national and international audiences. Turner profiled figures in the art community for the "City Focus" series on the Miami and South Florida art scene and covered prominent art collectors for the magazine's "Living with Art" series.

Turner's writing chronicles the Miami art community, profiling the careers of artists who contribute to the contemporary cultural history of the area. Her writing has appeared in Artburst Miami, Art+Auction, Art Circuits, Arte Al Dia, ARTnews, Biscayne Times, Burnaway, Delicious Line, Fine Art Globe, Hamptons Art Hub, Hyperallergic, Florida International University ArtSpeak and Miami Rail.

Turner held teaching positions in writing at Miami Dade College and has presented guest lectures at the University of Miami and New World School of the Arts.

Turner won the Rabkin Prize in 2020 for her visual arts writing. The Miami-Dade County Department of Cultural Affairs inducted Turner into the Arts Hall of Fame in 2025.

Turner is a member of the International Association of Art Critics and ArtTable, a national organization for women in visual arts professions.

Turner published an anthology of her art journalism in 2025. Miami's Art Boom: From Local Vision to International Presence, University Press of Florida. The book reflects on the art history and cultural revolution in Miami; it won the Richard E. Rice gold medal in the visual arts category in the Florida Book Awards 2025.

== Personal life ==
Turner lives and works in Miami, Florida, where she is married and has two adult children.
