= Cornelius Tulloch =

American artist

- Education: Cornell University
- Website: https://corneliustulloch.cargo.site/

Cornelius Tulloch is an interdisciplinary artist and designer based in Miami, Florida.

== Background and early life ==
Tulloch's father is Jamaican and his mother is African American. He went Design and Architecture Senior High and received the U.S. Presidential Scholar in the Arts award. He studied architecture at Cornell University.

== Career ==
Tulloch participated in an artist residency program in 2022 where he spent time in the Florida Everglades and examined how they may be spaces for Black liberation. He was influenced by Florida Highwaymen and Black Seminoles to create mixed media and photography based works as part of the residency. He created the piece Everglades Portrait. In 2022, Tulloch also created Bougainvillea: An Exploration of Adornment which focuses on Caribbean culture. Tulloch held an exhibition with his mentor Danny Baez, called Vendah in 2023. He received the YoungArts Jorge M. Pérez Award and a $25,000 award. In 2024, he was selected as Laureate for the Bakehouse x Cité internationale des arts residency within the Bakehouse Art Complex, Miami. He also presented his work at John F. Kennedy Center for the Performing Arts and won U.S. Presidential Scholars in the Arts award.
