= Jude Broughan =

New Zealand/American artist, mixed media

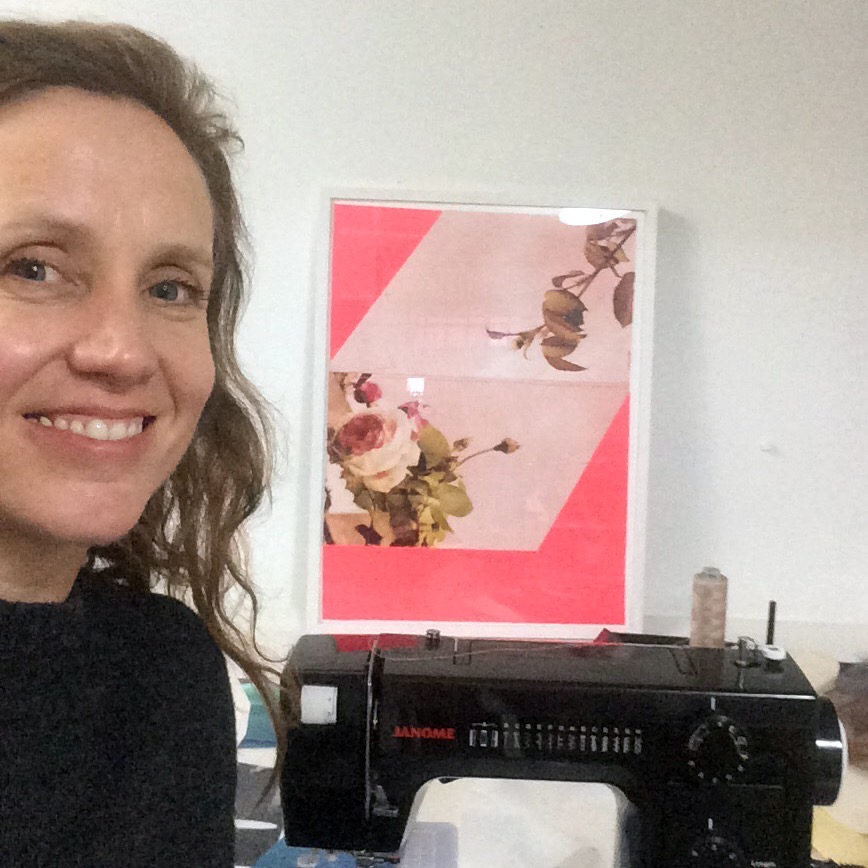
- Broughan with her work "Radio Four"
- Born: 1976 (age 49–50); Hamilton, New Zealand
- Education: MFA, Hunter College; BFA, School of Visual Arts
- Occupations: Artist and Educator

Jude Broughan (born 1976) is an artist and educator, born in Hamilton, New Zealand and now based in Brooklyn, New York. Broughan creates photo-based assemblages, slicing and stitching together original photographs, fabrics, painted and printed elements, in formal compositions that are abstracted and allegorical. She also creates limited edition prints and artists' books.

== Career ==
Broughan has had solo exhibitions at venues such as Benrubi Gallery. New York (2021, 2020, 2017), Marisa Newman Projects, New York (2017, 2019), Calder and Lawson Gallery, Hamilton, New Zealand (2015), Dimensions Variable, Miami (2014), and Churner & Churner, New York (2014). Her work has been included in numerous group exhibitions and projects including the Museum of Arts and Design, the MoMA Design Store, New York; Bakehouse Art Complex, Miami; Jarvis Dooney Gallerie, Berlin; Document, Chicago; Sanderson Contemporary Art, Auckland, New Zealand; Magnan Metz, New York; Dorfman Projects, New York; the Essl Museum, Vienna, and 601Artspace, New York.

Broughan holds an M.F.A. from Hunter College, New York, and a B.F.A. from the School of Visual Arts, New York. Her work has been discussed in the Site 95 journal, Kolaj Magazine, Musée Magazine, Domino, Art in America, Blouin Artinfo, Collector Daily, Eye Contact, the Village Voice, and Whitehot Magazine, among others.

Broughan teaches in the Visual Arts Department at the SUNY College at Old Westbury, New York. She has held teaching positions at Hunter College, and Borough of Manhattan Community College, CUNY. She has given artist talks at institutions including Hercules Art Studio Program, Pratt Institute, and School of Visual Arts.

== Awards ==
Pollock-Krasner Foundation Grant (2015), and a Yaddo Residency (2018).
