= Purvis Young =

American painter (1943–2010)

- Born: February 2, 1943; Liberty City, Florida
- Died: April 20, 2010 (aged 67); Miami, Florida
- Known for: Contemporary art, art brut, urban art, painting, installation art
- Awards: Artists/Fellowship, National Endowment for the Arts
- Patrons: Jane Fonda, Damon Wayans, Jim Belushi, Dan Aykroyd
- Website: Official website

Purvis Young (February 4, 1943 – April 20, 2010) was an American artist of Bahamian descent. Young's work is celebrated at the museum and institutional level while also finding a home in many private collections as well, with a following that included Brice Marden, Jane Fonda, Damon Wayans, Jim Belushi, Dan Aykroyd, and others. In 2006 a feature documentary titled Purvis of Overtown was produced about his life and work. His work is found in the collections of The Metropolitan Museum of Art, the Centre Pompidou, the Whitney Museum of American Art, the Los Angeles County Museum of Art, the Pérez Art Museum Miami, the Philadelphia Museum of Art, the Smithsonian American Art Museum, and others. In 2018, he was inducted into the Florida Artists Hall of Fame.

== Early life and work ==
Purvis Young was born in Liberty City, a neighborhood of Miami, Florida, on February 2, 1943. As a young boy, his uncle introduced him to drawing, but Young lost interest quickly. He never attended high school.

As a teenager, Young served three years (1961–64) in prison at North Florida's Raiford State Penitentiary for breaking and entering. While in prison he would regain his interest in art and began drawing and studying art books. When released, he began to produce thousands of small drawings, which he kept in shopping carts and later glued into discarded books and magazines that he found on the streets. He proceeded to move into the Overtown neighborhood of Miami. Young became attracted to a vacant alley called Goodbread Alley, which was named after the Jamaican bakeries that once occupied the street; he started living there in 1971.

== Mid-career ==
In the early 1970s, Young found inspiration in the mural movements of Chicago and Detroit, and decided to create a mural of inspiration Overtown. He had never painted before, but inspiration struck and he began to create paintings and nailing them to the boarded up storefronts that formed the alley. He painted on wood he found on the streets and occasionally paintings would "disappear" from the wall, but Young didn't mind. About two years after starting the mural, tourists started visiting the alley, mainly white tourists. Occasionally, Young sold paintings to visitors - tourists and collectors alike - right off the wall. The mural garnered media attention, including the attention of millionaire Bernard Davis, owner of the Miami Museum of Modern Art. Davis became a patron of Young, providing him with painting supplies as well. Davis died in 1973, leaving Young a local celebrity in Miami.

== Late career and death ==
Untitled by Purvis Young, ca. 1988, in the collection of the Smithsonian American Art Museum

In the late 1990s and early 2000s, he explored other inspirations by watching historical documentaries about war, the Great Depression, commerce, and Native American conflicts and struggles in the United States. In 1999 the Rubell family, notable art collectors from New York and creators of the Rubell Museum, purchased the entire content of Young's studio, a collection of almost 3,000 pieces. In 2008 the Rubells donated 108 works to Morehouse College In January 2007, Purvis was selected as the Art Miami Fair's Director's Choice Exhibition, sponsored by Grace Cafe and Galleries and the Bergman Collection, at the Miami Beach Convention Center. Young also helped to establish a number of outdoor art fairs in South Florida that continue today.

Sometime between 1998 and 2003, Purvis was commissioned to develop a mural at the Bakehouse Art Complex -- one of three surviving murals by the artist. The mural was commissioned in part as a community service project and was facilitated by Rosie Gordon Wallace, who is a prominent Miami curator and a friend of the artist. The mural preceded the influx of street art in the area (which began in the mid-to-late 2000s). It remains an important record of the neighborhood's cultural and social history.

With artistic success came monetary gain, and Young failed to maintain his estate. Before his death, he became involved in a legal battle with former manager Martin Siskind. Young sued Siskind for mismanagement of funds. In response, Siskind successfully petitioned for Young to be declared mentally incompetent, and Young's affairs were placed in control of legal guardians. According to friends, Young was not incompetent and was left destitute by the procedures. Siskind stated that he and Young had settled the suit amicably and that Young retained ownership of 1,000 paintings and was financially stable.

Young suffered from diabetes, and toward the latter years of his life, he had other health problems, undergoing a kidney transplant in 2007. He died on April 20, 2010 in Miami from cardiac arrest and pulmonary edema. He is survived by his two sisters Betty Rodriguez and Shirley Byrd, and his brother Irvin Byrd. There are conflicting reports about his relationship with Eddie Mae Lovest, the primary beneficiary of his will. According to some sources, she was his partner; however, Lovest has stated that they "never was married. Never was boyfriend and girlfriend." Instead, she says of the relationship that they were "the best of friends".

In 2015, The Bass Museum of Art announced that it is donating almost 400 pieces of Young's art to the permanent collection in the Black Archives History and Research Foundation of South Florida. The foundation is located in Lyric Theater in Overtown.

== Work ==
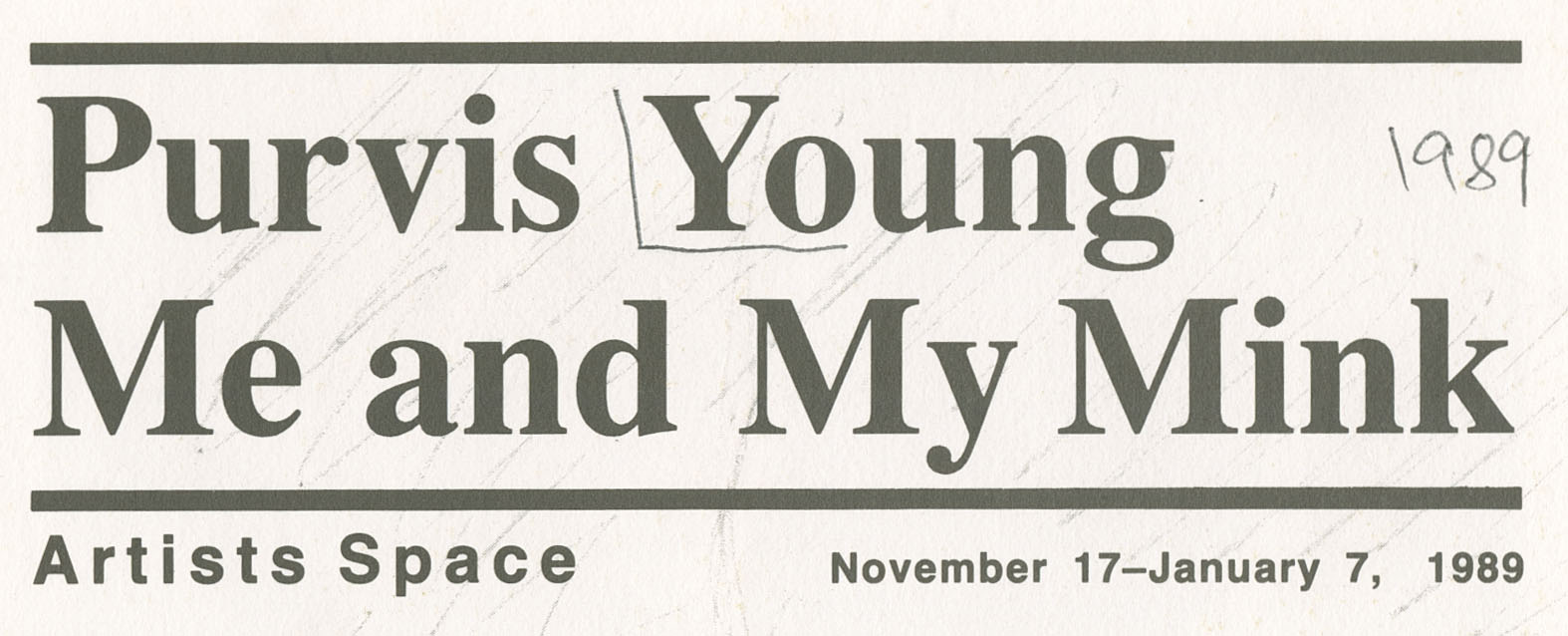
Artists Space Exhibition Brochure

Young found strong influence in Western art history and voraciously absorbed books from his nearby public library by Rembrandt, Vincent van Gogh, Gauguin, El Greco, Daumier and Picasso. His work was vibrant and colorful, and was described as appearing like fingerpainting. Reoccurring themes in his work were angels, wild horses, and urban landscapes. Through his works, he expressed social and racial issues, and served as an outspoken activist about politics and bureaucracy. He is credited with influencing the art movement terms social expressionism or urban expressionism.

In 2016, the records of art collector and dealer Jimmy Hedges and his Rising Fawn Folk Art Gallery were donated to the Smithsonian Archives of American Art on behalf of the Hedges Descendants Trust. Known as The Jimmy Hedges Papers, the file includes artist files, correspondence, photographs, and other materials documenting Hedges's interactions with hundreds of artists, whose homes and studios he visited, including Young. A 2018 addition to the papers consists of two linear feet of materials relating to Young, including photographs, biographical material, correspondence, notes, business records, and printed material.

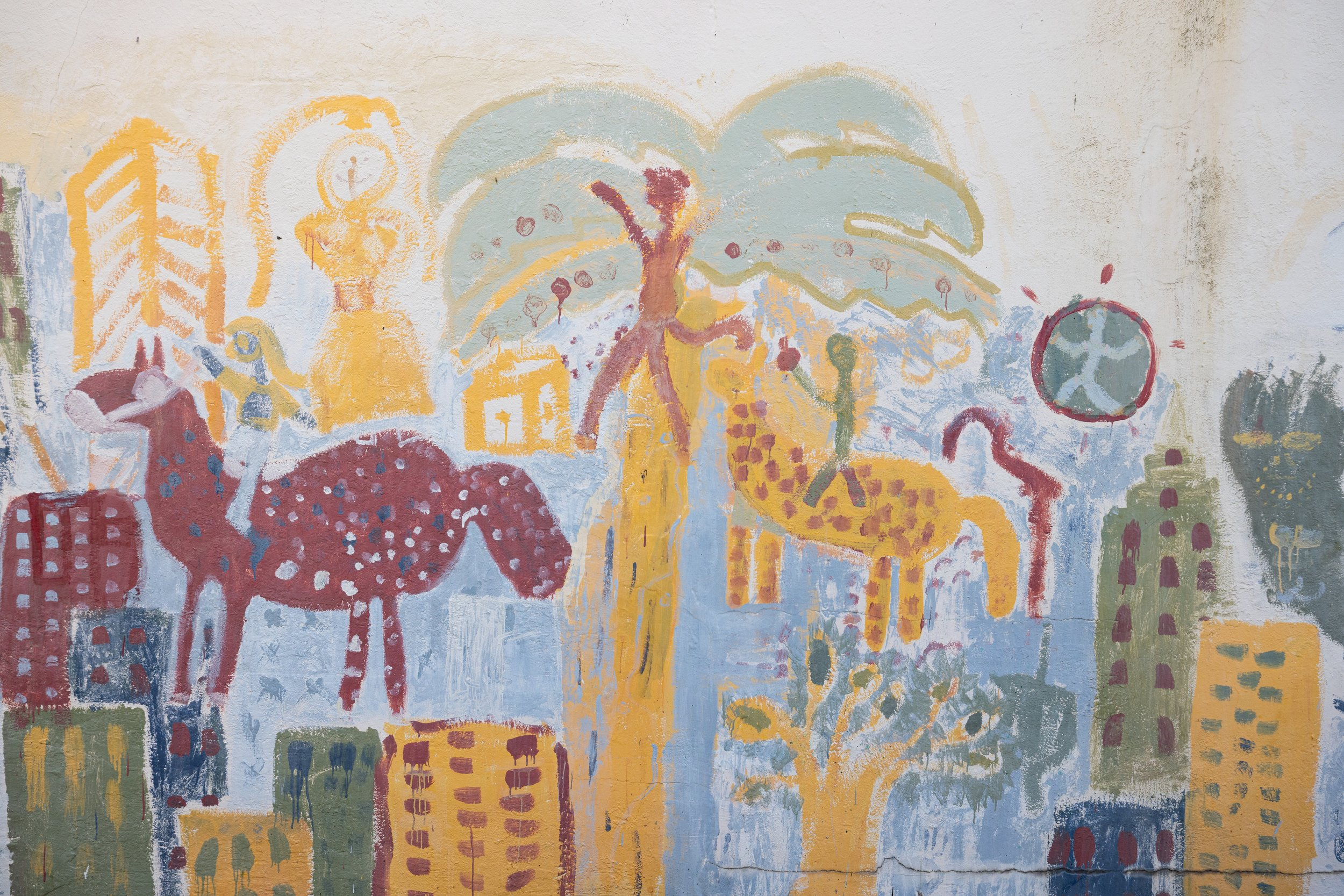
Untitled by Purvis Young, ca. 2003, at the Bakehouse Art Complex

In 2018, during the Art Basel/Miami Art week, Purvis Young was presented at the Japour Family Collection, and an entire floor of the Rubell Collection was dedicated to his works. Two Purvis Young works appear on the 2018 David Byrne album American Utopia.

By 2023, Young's once vibrant mural Untitled at the Bakehouse Art Complex was cracked. Through Bank of America's Art Conservation Project, led by RLA Conservation CEO Rosa Lowinger, one of the oldest murals in Wynwood was revived.

=== Reception ===
Purvis Young is a storyteller…through art, he speaks the language of the people. Just as written language as communicated through a very condensed system of letters, Purvis Young tells his stories through paint to become the unofficial storyteller. Carol Damian, Art Historian, 1997 - Morehouse president Robert Michael Franklin stated "Purvis Young has used his art as social commentary and a catalyst for justice."

=== Public collections ===
- Centre Pompidou
- Los Angeles County Museum of Art
- Metropolitan Museum of Art
- Minneapolis Institute of Art
- National Gallery of Art
- Pérez Art Museum Miami
- Smithsonian
- Speed Art Museum
- The Whitney
- Tampa Museum of Art

=== Exhibitions ===
- Miami Beach Art Basel, 2018
- What Carried Us Over: Gifts from the Gordon Bailey Collection, Pérez Art Museum Miami, 2019-2020
- Tampa Museum of Art, 2022-2024
