= D. Del Reverda-Jennings =

American artist

- Born: Alaska, United States
- Occupation: Visual artist

"I Am Not My Hair" by D. Del Reverda-Jennings

D. Del Reverda-Jennings is an American interdisciplinary artist and curator based in Indianapolis, Indiana known for her paintings and mixed media pieces. Del Reverda-Jennings has exhibited work across the United States, including at the Cincinnati Art Museum and the Indianapolis Museum of Contemporary Art.

Born in Alaska, Del Reverda-Jennings was raised in Chicago and is now based in Indianapolis. As a primarily self-taught artist, she often addresses in her work themes of the African diaspora, the Divine feminine, and personal identity. In 2023, Del Reverda-Jennings received a Governor's Art Award from the Indiana Arts Commission and Office of the Governor in Indiana.
