= María Martínez-Cañas =

Cuban-born photographer (born 1960)

- Born: 1960 (age 65–66); Havana, Cuba
- Education: Philadelphia College of Art (B.F.A.); School of the Art Institute of Chicago (M.F.A.)
- Known for: Photography

María Martínez-Cañas (born 1960) is a Cuban-born photographer whose work primarily deals with her Cuban heritage and journeys of discovery.

== Personal life and education ==
Martínez-Cañas was born in 1960 in Cuba, but her family moved to Miami when she was three months old, then Puerto Rico around the age of four. She graduated from the Philadelphia College of Art with a Bachelor of Fine Arts in photography in 1982 and earned a Master of Fine Arts in the same subject from the School of the Art Institute of Chicago two years later. She received a Fulbright-Hays Fellowship in 1985 to photograph and do research in Spain, relating to the discovery of Cuba by Christopher Columbus.

== Art ==
Despite growing up in Puerto Rico, Martínez-Cañas has always felt more Cuban than Puerto Rican, but she first felt at home when visiting Spain in 1984. During this visit she began combining her graphic designs with maps, initially with those that Christopher Columbus sketched on his voyages to the New World. Documents related to Cuba often have formed the basis for Martínez-Cañas's photographs and are sometimes contrasted with door and windows that suggest openings and closings; the revealed and the hidden. Some of her later work has been creating photograms by placing vegetative matter from her backyard between photographic paper and a light source.

She received a grant from the National Endowment for the Arts (1988) and her work has received many awards, including the Civitella Ranieri Foundation Fellowship in Umbertide, Italy (2014). Her works can be founds in the Los Angeles County Museum of Art, the Lowe Art Museum, the University of Miami, the Museum of Modern Art, the Whitney Museum of American Art, the Pérez Art Museum Miami, and the Smithsonian Institution, among other places.
