= Nakajima Hiroyuki =

Japanese artist and calligrapher

- 中嶋宏行
- Born: February 17, 1956 (age 70); Chiba, Japan
- Education: Post-Graduate Degree in Architectonics (Industrial Engineering)
- Alma mater: Chiba University
- Style: SHO Art
- Website: http://www.sho-jp.com

Nakajima Hiroyuki (中嶋宏行, born February 17, 1956) is a contemporary Japanese artist and calligrapher from Chiba, Japan. He is best known for his modern interpretation of Japanese calligraphy (shodo) which he calls Sho art, a technique which combines the traditional elements of Japanese calligraphy (shodo) with the movements of tai chi and inspired by the symbols of zen and nature. Nakajima currently has studios in Chiba, Japan and Milan, Italy.

== Biography ==
Nakajima was born in Chiba, Japan. He began his training in shodo at the age of 6 and would continue his studies through his post-graduate years at Chiba University where he received a degree in Achitectonics (Industrial Engineering). While in his twenties, Nakajima began training in tai chi.

By the time Nakajima was in his thirties, he had already started to develop his own style of contemporary Japanese calligraphy, and became a professional artist. Nakajima exhibited his work for the first time in 2000 at a private exhibition in Rome. The pieces selected for this exhibition consisted mostly of Japanese calligraphy that were recognized as abstract art which depicted Japanese characters as their theme.

Shortly after his exhibition in Rome, Nakajima introduced the movements of tai chi into his art, intending to demonstrate the process of creating the art by means of a performance. Most of his performances begin with Nakajima standing in a meditative state over a blank canvas, and then when inspired uses one sharp stroke of the brush to create the abstract form of nature: moon, soil, mountain. Nakajima has explained that the one stroke of a brush is carried out with a single, condensed thought to bring about the forms and lines of a moment in time.

Nakajima has said, "Every work of 'Sho' is created in one continuous motion, and therefore cannot be repeated or re-written. The power of 'Sho' lies in this feature of non-recurrence. Even if you draw the same letter ten times, ten different forms will arise spontaneously."

Since then, Nakajima has held exhibitions and live performances throughout Europe, Japan and the United States. In 2006 he was invited to participate in the 60th Festival d'Avignon in France, and in the 2006 Art Basel Miami Beach Show (the American sister event of Art Basel in Switzerland), where he debuted in the United States. Nakajima currently has studios in Chiba, Japan and in Milan, Italy.

== Exhibitions ==
Year	Exhibitions
1997	Gallery Nakazawa – Tokyo (JAPAN)
1999	Gallery Kai – Tokyo (JAPAN)
2000	Sho, Studio Soligo – Roma (ITALY) critic: Atsushi Suwa
2001	Sho, Institut D’Arts Visuels – Orléans (FRANCE) critic: Cristian Parisot-
	Lapin Et Halot – Tokyo (JAPAN)
	Sho, Galleria Montmartre Des Arts – Paris (FRANCE) critic: Cristian Parisot
2002	Ronald Schmitt tisch – Eberbach (GERMANY)
	Sky Gallery, Haneda-Airport – Tokyo (JAPAN)
2003	The International Furniture Fair – Cöln (GERMANY)
	Mike Amrta – Tokyo (JAPAN)
	Klingspor Museum – Offenbach (GERMANY)
	Kreis Museum – Peine (GERMANY)
	sho, Galerie Wild – Frankfurt am Main (GERMANY)
2004	Siebold Museum – Würzburg (GERMANY)
2005	The beach Associazione Culturale – Torino (ITALY)
	Crèations Japon, Centre d’Etudes Japonaises d’Alsace – Colmar (FRANCE)
2006	Lune, 60° Édition Festival d’Avignon – Avignon (FRANCE)
	Mond, Siegburg Stadtmuseum – Siegburg (GERMANY)
	Gallery Tact – Tokyo (JAPAN)
2007	Gallery Tact – Tokyo (JAPAN)
2008	Gallery Tact – Tokyo (JAPAN)
2009	Gallery Tact – Tokyo (JAPAN)
2011	Ri-Vivere, Arte Giappone – Milano (ITALY)
2012	Kizuna, Gallery Tact – Tokyo (JAPAN)
	Shizen, Galleria Nobili – Milano (ITALY) critic: Matteo Galbiati
2013	Forme de Zen, Galerie F. Mansart – Paris (France)
2014	the form I have never seen, Ikkyo-Ann – Tokyo (Japan)

== Performances ==
Year	Performances
2001	Lapin Et Halot – Tokyo (JAPAN)
	Prèsence Japonaise, Scene Nazionale – Orléans (FRANCE)
2002	Santa Claus Forest – Rovaniemi (FINLAND)
	Ronald Schmitt tisch, Eberbach (GERMANY)
2003	Klingspor Museum – Offenbach (GERMANY)
	Kreis Museum – Peine (GERMANY)
2005	the beach- Associazione Culturale- Torino (ITALY)
	Crèations Japon, Centre d’Etudes Japonaises d’Alsace – Colmar (FRANCE)
2006	Lune, The 60° Édition Festival d’Avignon – Avignon (FRANCE)
	Del Kalligraph der Seele, Siegburg Stadtmuseum – Siegburg (GERMANY)
	Ichimura Miami Japan Garden – Miami (U.S.A.)
	Bakehouse Art Complex, Miami (U.S.A.)
2009	Leben, Siegburg Stadtmuseum – Siegburg (GERMANY)
	Leben, Heiliggeistkirche – Speyer (GERMANY)
	Vivere, Arte Giappone – Milano (ITALY)
2010	Luna, La Casa delle culture del mondo – Milano (ITALY)
	Vivere, La Triennale di Milano – Milano (ITALY)
2011	Sonne und Monde, Siegburg Stadtmuseum – Siegburg (GERMANY)
	Musicalligrapie with Lê Quan Ninh, Fondation Royaumont – Paris (FRANCE)
2012	Gratitude and Heritage, La Rochelle – Tokyo (JAPAN)
	Carrousel Du Louvre – Paris (FRANCE)
2013	Water, Takeshigerou – Kyoto (JAPAN)
2018	Japan House - London (ENGLAND)

== Media and publications ==
Year	Media & Publications
2000	“ARCHIVIO” (ITALY)
2001	TV “Gendai-Nihongaku-Genron” (JAPAN)
	“Republique” (FRANCE)
	TV “IL DE FRANCE CENTRE” (FRANCE)
2002	“Lapin Kansa” (FINLAND)
	“Eberbach Zeitung” (GERMANY)
2003	“a&a DIE ZEITUNG” (GERMANY)
2004	“KULTUR” (GERMANY)
2005	“DERNIERES NOUVELLES D’ALSACE” (FRANCE)
2006	“LE FIGARO” (FRANCE)
	TV “Draw MOON in Provence” (JAPAN)
	“GENERAL-ANZEIGER” (GERMANY)
	“Rein-Sieg Rundschau” (GERMANY)
	“Herald Tribune” (U.S.A.)
	“Japan Times” (JAPAN)
2007	“Plexus” (VENEZUELA)
2010	“la Repubblica Tutto Milano” (ITALY)
2011	“Vivi Milano” (ITALY)
	“Rein-Sieg Rundschau” (GERMANY)
	“Kolner Stadt-Anzeiger” (GERMANY)
2012	“Corriere della Sera” (ITALY)
