= Stephen Baron Johnson =

American painter

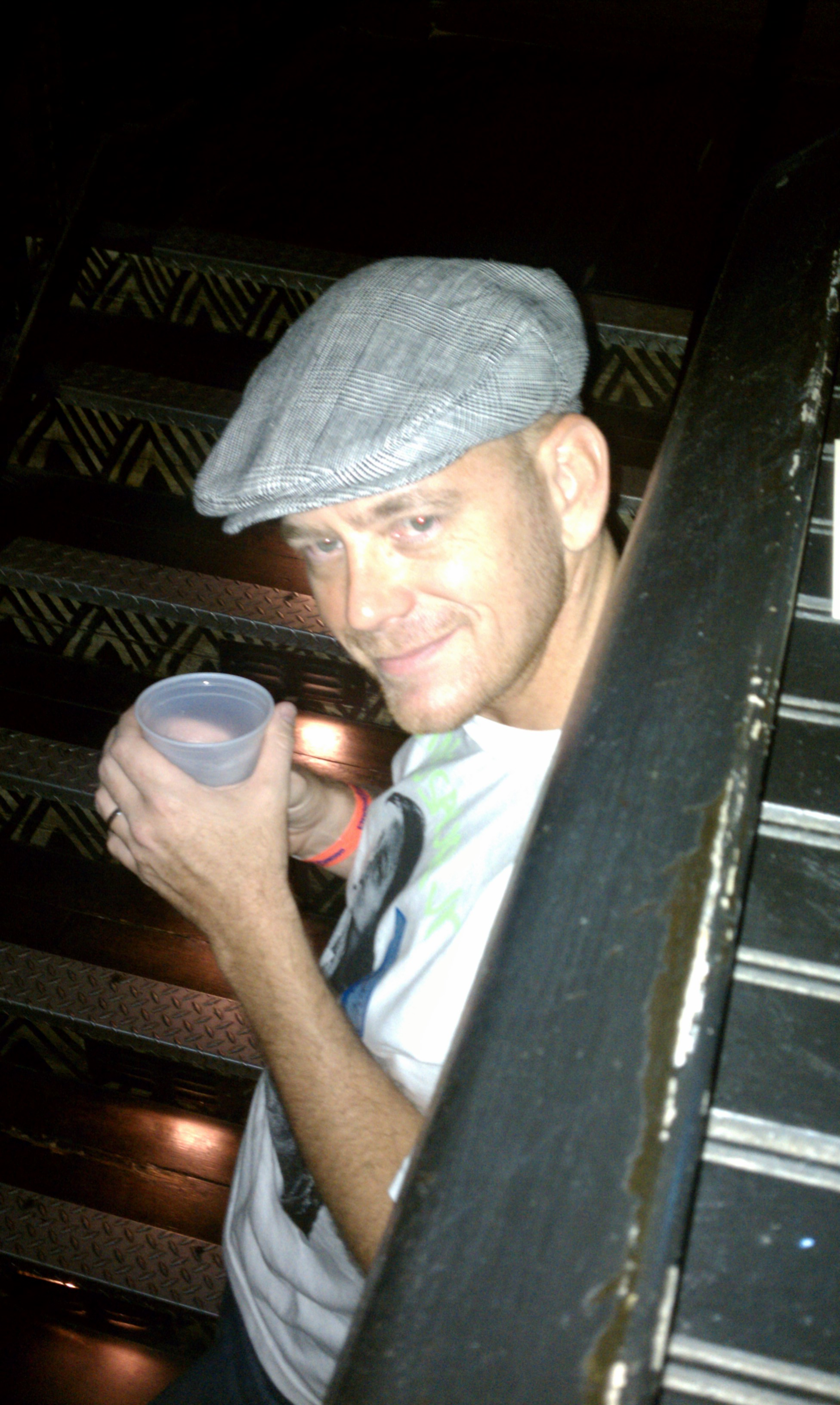
- Stephen Baron Johnson, American artist
- Born: Lakeland, Florida
- Known for: Painting

Stephen Baron Johnson is an American artist. He is most well known for linear style, influenced by architecture and other objects relating to the built environment.

== Background ==
Johnson was born and raised in Lakeland, Florida. From a young age, he began showing an interest in drawing and would sketch constantly. His passion for art never wavered and Johnson would even sketch while on his father's construction sites.

== Career ==
Johnson has said the following about his art: "Rather than flee from the dowdy, I make it my own. My work is a celebration of America’s built environment. In many of my images, buildings loom large, isolated almost like sculptures in their own right. Scenes are reduced to the skeleton of their structuring geometries. The viewer is invited to take pleasure in not only the subject as a whole, but also in its individual components. My paintings of icehouses and corner stores, of movie theaters and shop signs, revel in precisely these kinds of unassuming geometric marvels. My work lends dignity to the unspectacular."

== Exhibitions ==
"Art & Architecture" – Platform 14 (September 26, 2009), Lakeland, FL.

“2009 California Open Exhibition” (August 19 – September 4), Tag Gallery, Santa Monica, California. Juror: Michael Zakian, Director, Frederick R. Weisman Museum of Art. He has served as president of the Art Historians of Southern California and authored numerous books on art history including Agnes Pelton: Poet of Nature, Sam Francis: Elements & Archetypes, Wayne Thiebaud: Works 1955 to 2003 and Russell Forester: Unauthorized Autobiography

"Annual Juried Exhibition" (June 26 – July 26, 2009), Majestic Gallery, Nelsonville, Ohio. Juror: Catherine Evans, Chief Curator of the Columbus Museum of Art.

"Continuum" (March 10 – April 11, 2009), George Segal Gallery, Montclair, New Jersey. Juror: Patterson Sims, Director of the Montclair Art Museum, former Deputy Director for Education and Research Support at The Museum of Modern Art and was the first curator designated to oversee the permanent collection of the Whitney Museum of American Art

"Paraphernalia" Art Basel 2008 (December 5 – January 31), Bakehouse Art Complex, Miami, Florida. Jurors: Carol Damian, Director of the Frost Art Museum, Bernice Steinbaum, Owner and Director of Bernice Steinbaum Gallery, Peter Boswell, Chief Curator for the Miami Art Museum

"View and Review" (October 17, 2008), Polk Museum of Art, Lakeland, Florida. Guest Crtique by Vilas Tonape

"Snap to Grid" (October 9 – November 1, 2008), LACDA, Los Angeles, California

“17th National Juried Exhibition” (June 18 – July 12, 2008), Phoenix Gallery, New York, New York. Juror: Esther Adler, Curatorial Asst., Museum of Modern Art
