= Tatjana Rebelle =

American activist

Tatjana Rebelle is an activist, writer, and spoken word artist based in Indianapolis, Indiana. They are the founder of VOCAB, a once-a-month open mic created to highlight marginalized people's music and poetry, and a member of the Looking Glass Alliance at Newfields. Rebelle has written her own chapbook, "This is America", as well as contributed to other publications such as Tamara Winfrey Harris's book "Dear Black Girl: Letters From Your Sisters About Stepping Into Your Power". Inspired by her idol Bayard Rustin, Rebelle works to fight for social justice reform for the LGBTQIA+ community and people of color.

== Early life ==
Rebelle was born in Germany, only moving to Indiana at the age of two where they were raised by their German mother. In middle school, Rebellle wrote their first poem, and it was about the abuse they experienced in their childhood. They continued to perform this piece for audiences into adulthood.

== Career ==
After being ill-received in the Indiana open mic scene, Tatjana Rebelle founded VOCAB to be a more inclusive and welcoming environment for those who are a part of marginalized communities. This open mic, originally hosted by Rebelle, runs out of the White Rabbit Caberra and has been around since 2007.

Rebelle gave a speech during the 2018 March for Our Lives Rally at the Indiana Statehouse. A ten-second clip of this speech was posted by a YouTuber who accused Rebelle of being "anti-white". The comments section under the video was filled with racist and uneducated remarks by viewers that were later quoted by Rebelle in their chapbook, "This is America". Rebelle also included these comments in an art installation in which they enlarged the words in real life on a wall in order to create a space where the words could not be ignored. Rebelle's chapbook also included a collection of their writings and an explanation of the events that lead to the book's creation tracing back to the fallout of their speech at the 2018 March for our Lives Rally.

The book "Dear Black Girl: Letters from Your Sisters About Stepping into Your Power," curated by Tamara Winfrey Harris, also includes writings by Rebelle. This book is a collection of more than 30 letters written for an audience of Black girls for the purpose of giving guidance regarding a variety of experiences that they may go through in their lives. Rebelle wrote her letter for those who are struggling with their sexuality and gender identity with the intention of providing a hopeful perspective to the young readers of the book. "Dear Black Girls" was published March 9, 2021.

In July 2021, Rebelle gave a TEDx Talk about their experiences as a bisexual, biracial, binational, nonbinary person in America. In this talk they also explain to the audience what activism means to them, how protesting against systems of oppression has created challenges in their life, and how we as a society should not allow ourselves to be silenced as a result of these challenges.

Rebelle is a member of the Looking Glass Alliance at the Indianapolis Museum of Art, which is made up of a select few local individuals brought on to help curate the new American galleries at the museum. The IMA included these guest curators in the process of developing this gallery with the goal of adding context to physical artwork in order to encompass a more inclusive vision of America. Rebelle personally selected three paintings for this gallery: "Portrait of Dr. Lewis D. Lyons" by Barton Stone Hays, "Hauptmann Must Die" by Reginald Marsh, and "Herman and Verman" by Hugh M. Poe. For each of these paintings Rebelle wrote a reflective poem that imagined the harsh realities of racism that was thinly veiled in the images. All three poems contributed further contextualization for the visual depictions.

Currently, Rebelle is working as the Director of Equitable Initiatives at Earth Charter Indiana where they facilitate conversations surrounding social justice reform and the climate crisis.

== Anti-Defamation League scandal ==
On July 9, 2024, The Guardian released an article detailing information they obtained via a leaked Anti-Defamation League email. The ADL, who at the time had already been involved in controversy over their attacks on Israel critics, was revealed in this email to be gathering information on Rebelle due to their involvement in the Deadly Exchange campaign. Deadly Exchange was a campaign that pushed against a program back by the ADL that would involve US police officers training with Israel military. According to the Guardian, the email had a picture of Rebelle along with personal information about them that the ADL head of security Chris Delia suggested to be filed with the ADL's Center for Extremism which tracks what they refer to as "extremist trend".

== Awards and fellowships ==
- Wayfinder Fellow
- Creative Renewal Fellow
- Ambassador award from the 2024 Best of Green Schools Award presented by the Center for Green Schools and the Green Schools National Network
