= Alan Bacon =

Indianapolis artist and businessman

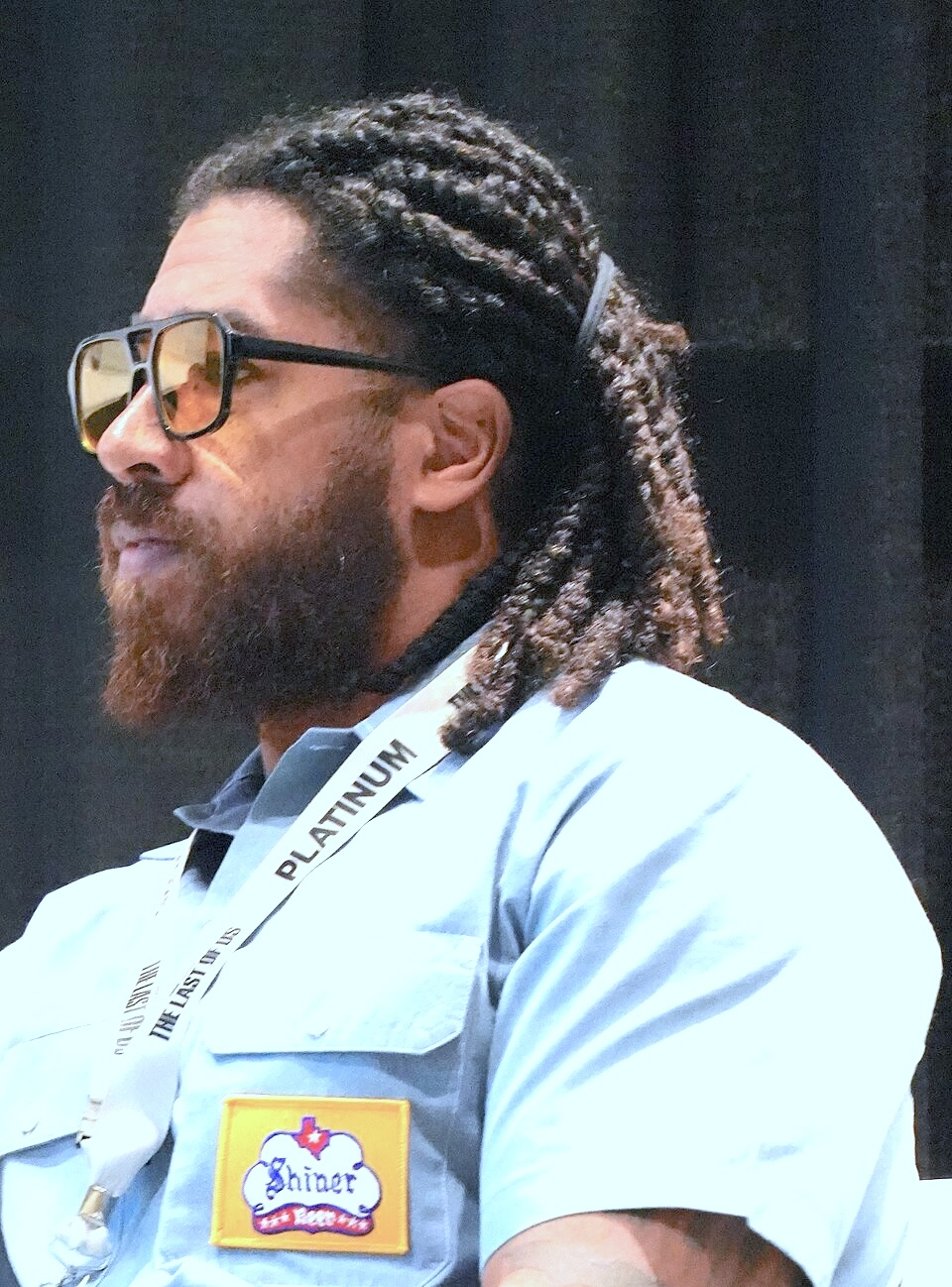
- Education: Indiana University Bloomington
- Organization: Ganggang
- Known for: Co-founder of GANGGANG and BUTTER fine art fair
- Spouse: Malina Simone Jeffers
- Website: ganggangculture.com/about/

Alan Bacon is the co-founder of Ganggang (stylized GANGGANG), a cultural development firm based in Indianapolis, Indiana that organizes the local Butter (stylized BUTTER) Fine Arts Fair. He has also worked in various roles at the (now defunct) Harrison College, including President of their Northwest Campus. Bacon's job history before the fruition of Ganggang also included stints at iLAB LLC and United Way of Central Indiana.

== Early life and education ==
Alan Bacon was raised in Indianapolis as the son of a city admin and a real estate business owner. His parents were both musicians and community volunteers, teaching him at an early age about local culture and community. Bacon's father also spent time working as a preacher, giving Bacon the opportunity to play drums at his church as a kid. Bacon comes from a family of musicians going back to vocalist and guitarist, Trevor Bacon, who was a member of the Lucky Millinder Orchestra.

Bacon graduated for Indiana University Bloomington with a degrees in criminal justice and African American studies.

== Career ==
In March 2006, Alan Bacon began working at Harrison College as an enrollment representative. At the university, Bacon went on to occupy several positions including director of enrollment, director of career services, regional director of career services, partnership consultant, and diversity manager. Ultimately, Bacon was promoted to president of Harrison College's Northwest Indianapolis campus in 2015.

After leaving Harrison College, Bacon was hired on as the global director of learning and development for iLAB LLC, in Johannesburg, South Africa.

In 2019, United Way of Central Indiana appointed Alan Bacon as senior director of the Social Innovation Fund as a part of their impact team. In this position, Bacon aided donors in discovering solutions for Hoosier poverty and generally improving Hoosiers' quality of life. While working for the United Way of Central Indiana, Bacon was chosen to be a member of the grant team that dispersed grants to 17 independent music venues as a part of Marion County's Music Cities Strategy Recovery Program.

In June 2020, spurred on by the murder of George Floyd as well as the Black Lives Matter protests, Malina Simone Jeffers, Bacon's wife, came up with the idea of a cultural startup that would put emphasis on Black-made art and artists in Indianapolis. At the time, Bacon was working at the United Way of Central Indiana and writing op-eds in the Indianapolis Recorder in his free time. That August, Bacon quit his job to pursue this cultural startup that he and his wife would go on to call Ganggang (stylized GANGGANG).

Before Ganggang's official launch in November 2020, the Bacons were organizers for the Black Lives Matter street mural in Indianapolis on the historically significant Indiana Avenue. The mural lead to Newfields (the Indianapolis Museum of Art) inviting Ganggang to guest curate the exhibit called "DRIP: Indy's #BlackLivesMatter Street Mural", with the intention of giving visitors a behind-the-scenes look at the making of the mural. Due to a controversy involving race at Newfields, Ganggang pulled out of the collaboration before it was put up in the galleries of the IMA.

Ganggang did come back to Newfields in 2022 to partner in another exhibition called "We. The Culture: Works by the Eighteen Art Collective". Alan Bacon and Malina Simone Jeffers collaborated in co-curating this exhibit showcasing the individual works of the 18 artists (also known as the Eighteen Collective) who painted the Black Lives Matter mural on Indiana Avenue.

== Honors and membership ==
- The 2023 Ovid Butler Founder's Award Recipient
- The 2024 Trailblazing Award
