= Leo Rabkin =

American painter

Leo Rabkin (1919, Cincinnati, New York — 2015, New York, New York) was an American artist and is in the collections of Museum of Modern Art and Smithsonian Institution.

Rabkin and his wife Dorothea founded the Dorothea and Leo Rabkin Foundation which annually gives $50,000 unrestricted grants to visual artists and art writers for intellectual and creative work.
