= Charles L. Venable =

American art curator and museum director

- Born: Charles Lane Venable; 1960 (age 65–66); Houston, Texas, U.S.
- Education: Rice University (1982); University of Delaware (1986); Boston University (Ph.D. 1993)
- Occupation: Museum director
- Children: 1

Charles Lane Venable (born 1960) is an American art curator and museum director. Early in his career, he published multiple articles and books on American art history, including on the history of silverware and furniture. Starting in 1986, Venable was a curator at the Dallas Museum of Art, before moving to the Cleveland Museum of Art in 2002, and the Speed Art Museum in 2007, where he served as the director. In 2012, Venable became the director of the Indianapolis Museum of Art, which was renamed to "Newfields" under a rebranding effort he initiated. Venable served as the head of the museum until 2021, when he stepped down from the role amidst calls for his removal.

== Early life and education ==
Charles Lane Venable was born in Houston, Texas in 1960, where he was also raised. He attended Rice University where he studied art history and history, graduating in 1982. Venable then graduated from the University of Delaware's Winterthur Program in Early American Culture masters degree program in 1986. He completed the doctoral program in American Studies at Boston University in 1993, with a focus on the history of the American silverware industry.

== Career ==
=== Early curatorial roles and directorship (1986-2011) ===
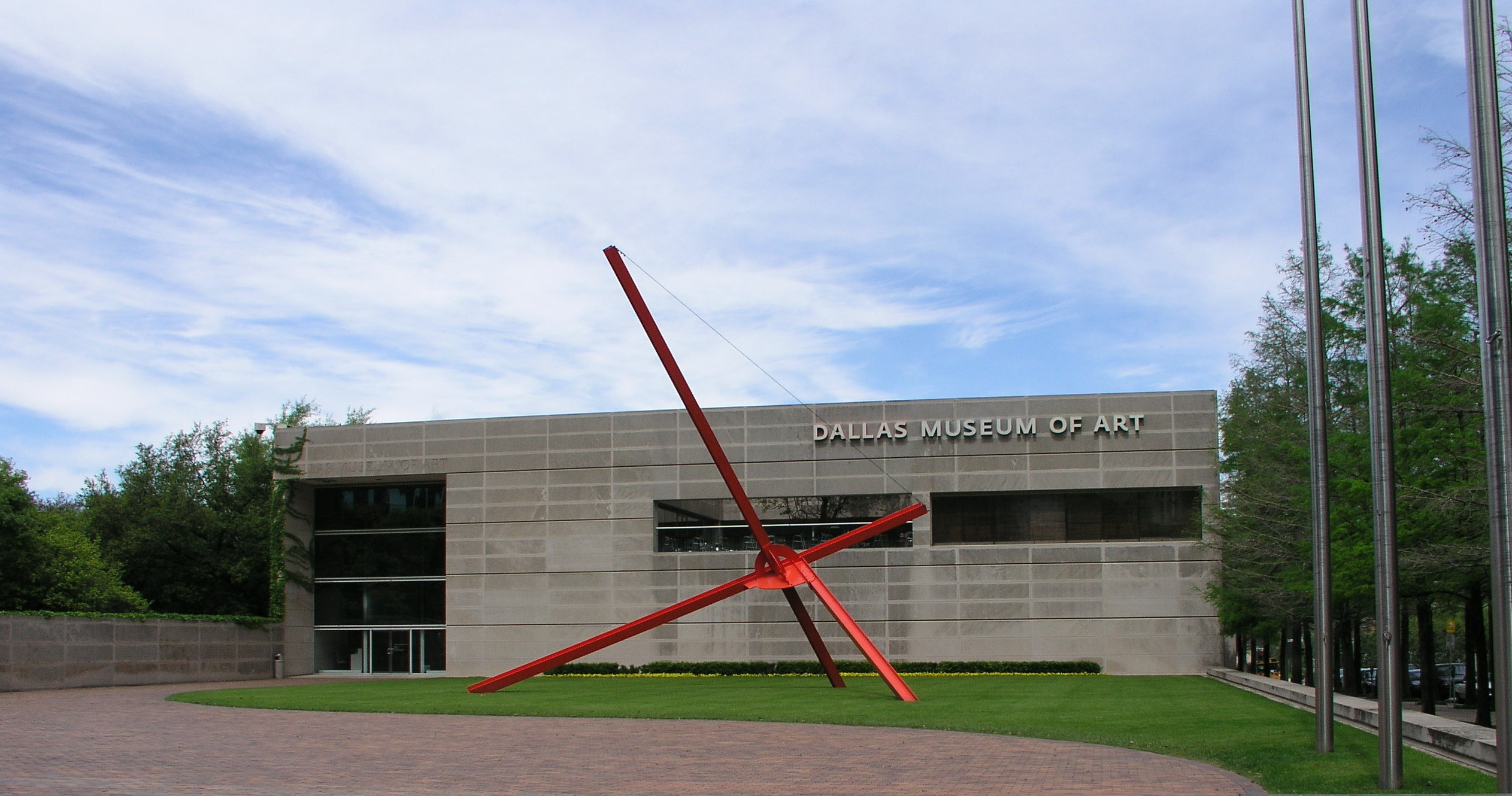
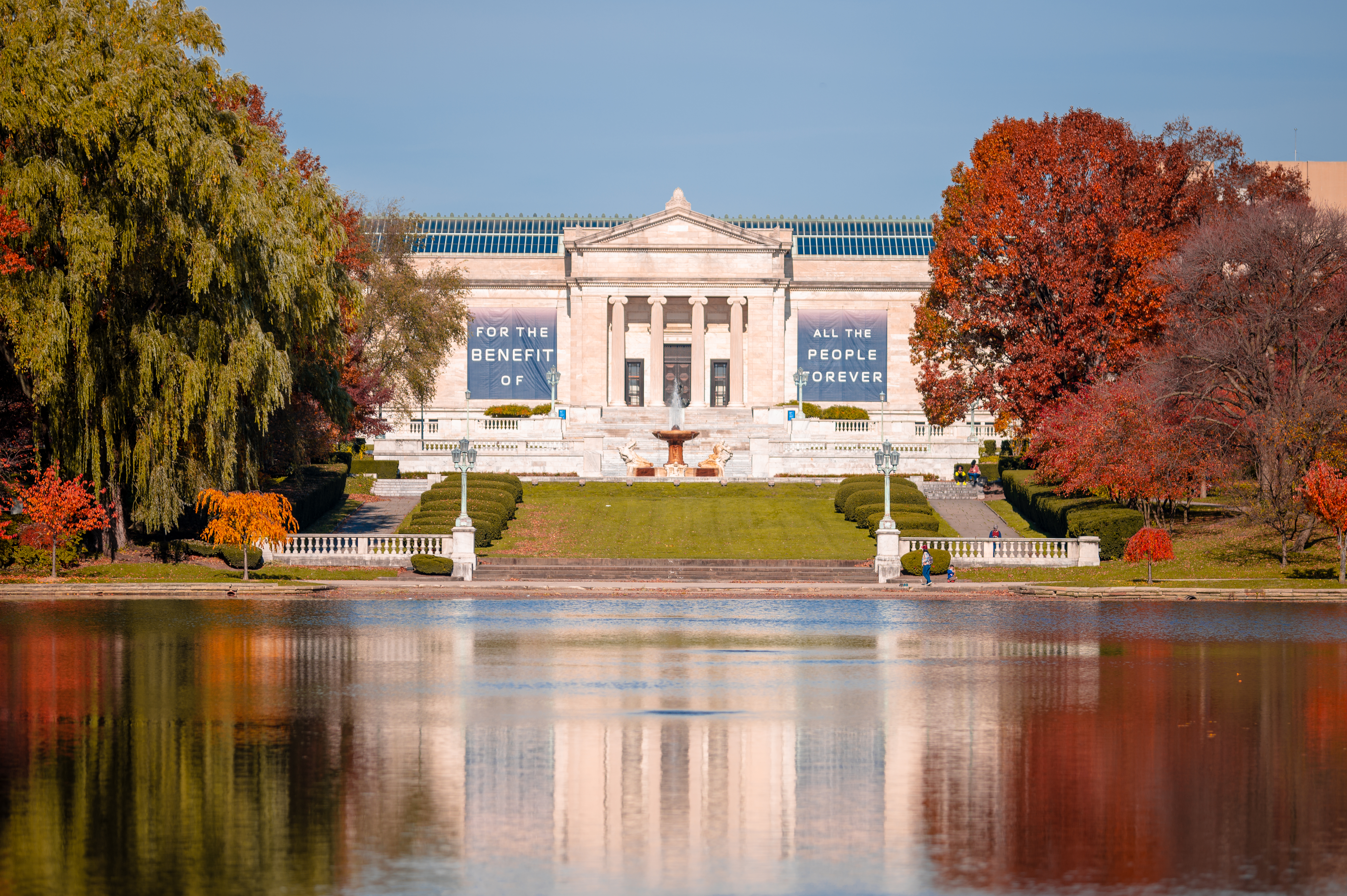
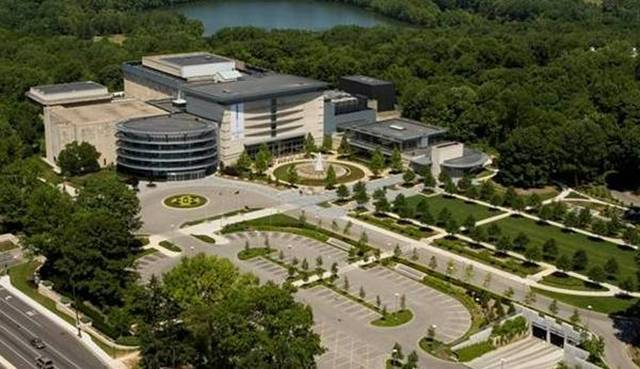
Museums Venable has worked at. Left to right, top to bottom: The Dallas Museum of Art, the Cleveland Museum of Art, the Speed Art Museum in Louisville, Kentucky, the Indianapolis Museum of Art.

Venable was hired by the Dallas Museum of Art in 1986 as its first curator of decorative arts. His book, Silver in America was published during this time and was followed by Venable’s first major exhibition by the same title, which opened in Dallas in November 1994. Venable worked at the Dallas Museum of Art for 16 years, during which time he became the museum's deputy director.

Venable was hired in 2002 by the Cleveland Museum of Art (CMA) as the deputy director for collections and programs, overseeing the development of exhibitions, publications, and art acquisitions. His work also included the expansion and building renovation done by architect Rafael Viñoly.

Venable left the Cleveland Museum of Art in 2007 to become the director of the Speed Art Museum in Louisville, Kentucky, starting on October 29, 2007. His work there included overseeing a quality assessment of the institution's collection, as well as renovated building space designed by Kulapat Yantrasast.

=== Time at the Indianapolis Museum of Art (2012-2021) ===
The logo for "Newfields", the rebranding initiative for the Indianapolis Museum of Art initiated by Venable.

In 2012, Venable became the director of the Indianapolis Museum of Art (IMA), replacing Maxwell L. Anderson who left the museum in late 2011. In April 2015, Venable and the board ended the organization's long-standing policy of free admission to all visitors, a move which was largely criticized by the media and patrons, but that the museum maintained was needed for financial stability. In 2017, Venable led the decision to rebrand the institution as “Newfields: A Place for Nature and the Arts” where additional emphasis was placed on the campus's several garden and the Virginia B. Fairbanks Art & Nature Park. This was preceded by the exodus of several curators, including Sarah Urist Green, Tricia Paik, and Scott Stulen.

In early 2018, the organization's new direction was heavily criticized by art critic Kriston Capps writing for CityLab, stating the changes were, "the greatest travesty in the art world in 2017" and that, "Venable [had] turned a grand encyclopedic museum into a cheap Midwestern boardwalk." The criticisms were widely discussed in the art community and Indianapolis media.

In 2019, Venable sought to improve the quality of the IMA’s art collection, as well as reduce the amount of money the museum spent on art storage. The museum spent $5.6 million per year to store and maintain the art, and in 2018, the museum needed to double its storage space at what would have been a cost of $12 million. He initiated a seven-year review of all 55,000 art objects in the collection, asking curators to rank them in terms of quality from a high "A" to low "D". This exercise allowed the institution to identify and promote its masterpieces, while slating lower quality pieces for deaccessioning in accordance with national museum standards. Venable's thoughts on the unsustainability of rapid collection growth and building expansions to accommodate more and more art brought him national attention, but proved controversial to some, including the IMA's staff.

Venable also spearheaded efforts to bring large-scale digital art to the IMA galleries. The institution dedicated 30,000 sq. ft. of galleries called "The Lume" for digital art exhibitions in 2021, replacing the contemporary art exhibit at the museum.

Venable and Newfields drew national attention in February 2021 for a job posting for a new director. The Board of Trustees had elevated Venable to the new position of President of Newfields as part of a transition strategy that included Venable’s planned retirement in a few years and the appointment of a new art museum director. In consultation with the San Francisco-based executive search firm m/Oppenheim Associates, a job description was created that stressed the desire for Newfields to diversify its audience over time without losing supporters who made up its current "core, white art audience". The phrase received widespread backlash and sparked a larger discussion of what was described by some former employees as a “toxic” and “discriminatory” culture at the IMA. An open letter from 85 Newfields employees and members of the board of governors, as well as another from more than 1,900 artists, local arts leaders and former employees of the museum, both called for his removal. Venable submitted his resignation on February 17, 2021.

== Publications and exhibitions ==
Venable has edited and written several scholarly publications. His book, American Furniture in the Bybee Collection (1989), was awarded the Charles F. Montgomery Award of the Decorative Arts Society (DAS). His 1994 publication, Silver in America, 1840-1940: A Century of Splendor, received the DAS's Montgomery Prize. Venable co-authored, China and Glass in America, 1880-1980 in 2000.

During his time as director of Newfields, Venable periodically curated exhibitions, including the IMA's silver exhibition, Tiffany, Gorham, and the Height of American Silver : 1840-1930. and Dining by Design: American Silver 1925-2000.

== Personal life ==
Venable married Martin Webb in October 2013, having been together since 1998. They have a daughter. Webb and Venable have collected American and European decorative art and contemporary art since they met in 1998.

Venable lived in Westerley House during his directorship at Newfields until he left in 2021. Before leaving, he had stated a desire to move out of the house as part of an effort from Newfields to save money and for the director to have a less public-facing residence. Venable now lives in Florida.

== Bibliography ==
- American Furniture in the Bybee Collection, 1989. Winner of the Charles F. Montgomery Award.
- Silver in American, 1840-1940: A Century of Splendor, 1994. Winner of the Charles F. Montgomery Book Prize.
- Decorative Art Highlights from the Wendy and Emery Reves Collection, 1995
- Editor and contributor, Dallas Museum of Art: A Guide to the Collection, 1997
- "Germanic Craftsmen and Design in Philadelphia, 1820-1850", Journal of American Furniture, 1998
- Editor and contributor, China and Glass in American, 1880-1980: From Table Top to TV Tray, 2000
- Editor, Modernism in American Silver: 20th-Century Design, 2005
- Newfields: A Place for Nature & the Arts, 2017, ISBN 0936260823
