= Papel picado =

Mexican decorative craft made by tissue paper

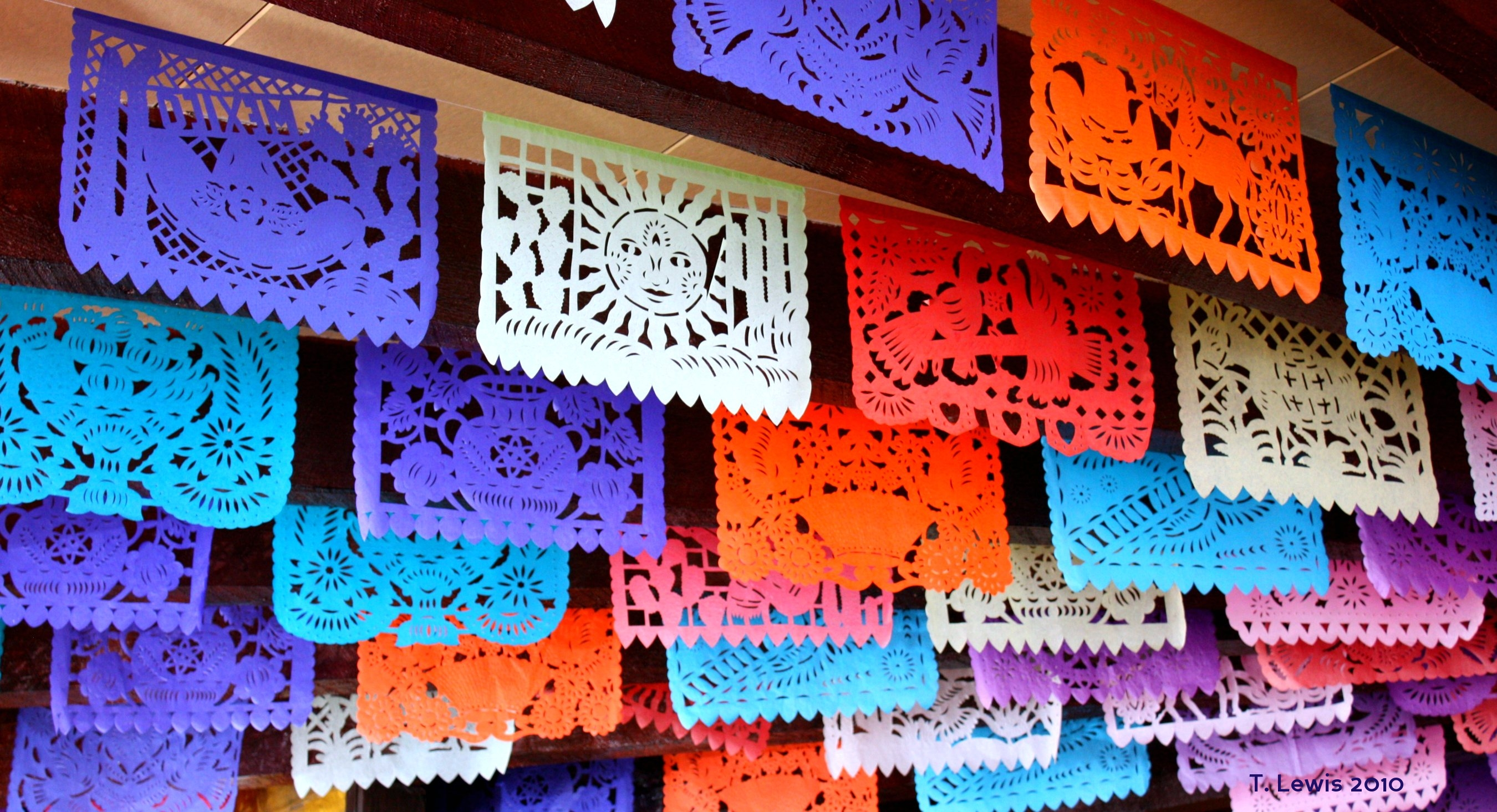
Papel picado

Papel picado ("perforated paper," "pecked paper") is a traditional Mexican decorative craft made by cutting elaborate designs into sheets of tissue paper. The designs are commonly cut from stacks of 40-50 colored tissue papers using a guide or template, a small mallet, and chisels. Papel picado can also be made by folding tissue paper and using small, sharp scissors. Common themes include birds, floral designs, and skeletons.

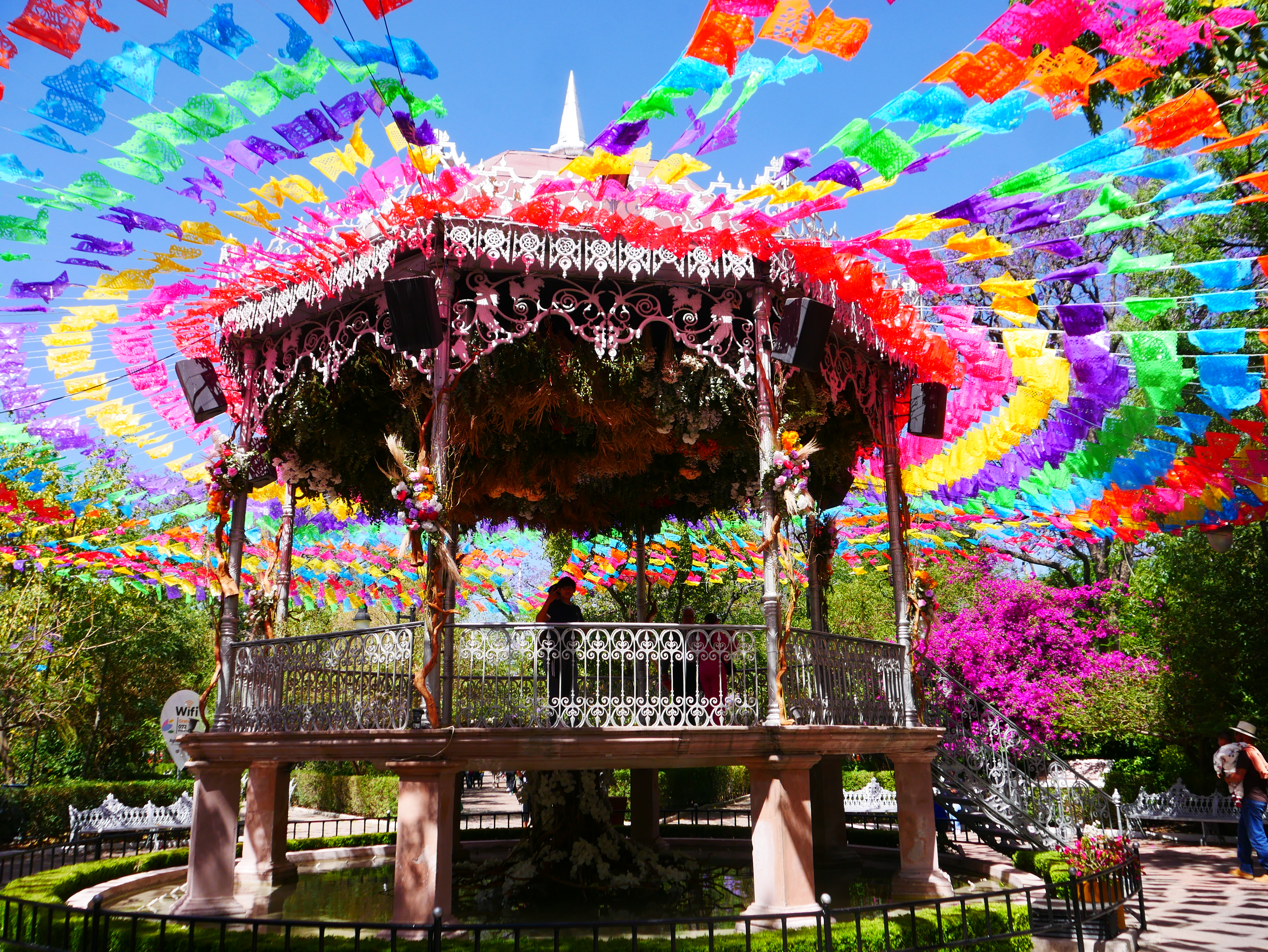
Papel picado decorating the kiosk of the Jardín de San Marcos during the Feria Nacional de San Marcos

Papel picados are commonly displayed for both secular and religious occasions. Commonly strung together and used as decorations during the Fiestas Patrias, papel picado is also used during Easter, Christmas, the Day of the Dead, as well as during weddings, quinceañeras, baptisms, christenings, and feast days. In Mexico, papel picados are often incorporated into the altars (ofrendas) during the Day of the Dead and are hung throughout the streets during holidays. In the streets of Mexico, papel picados are often strung together to create a banner that can either be hung across alleyways or displayed in the home.

== Origins ==
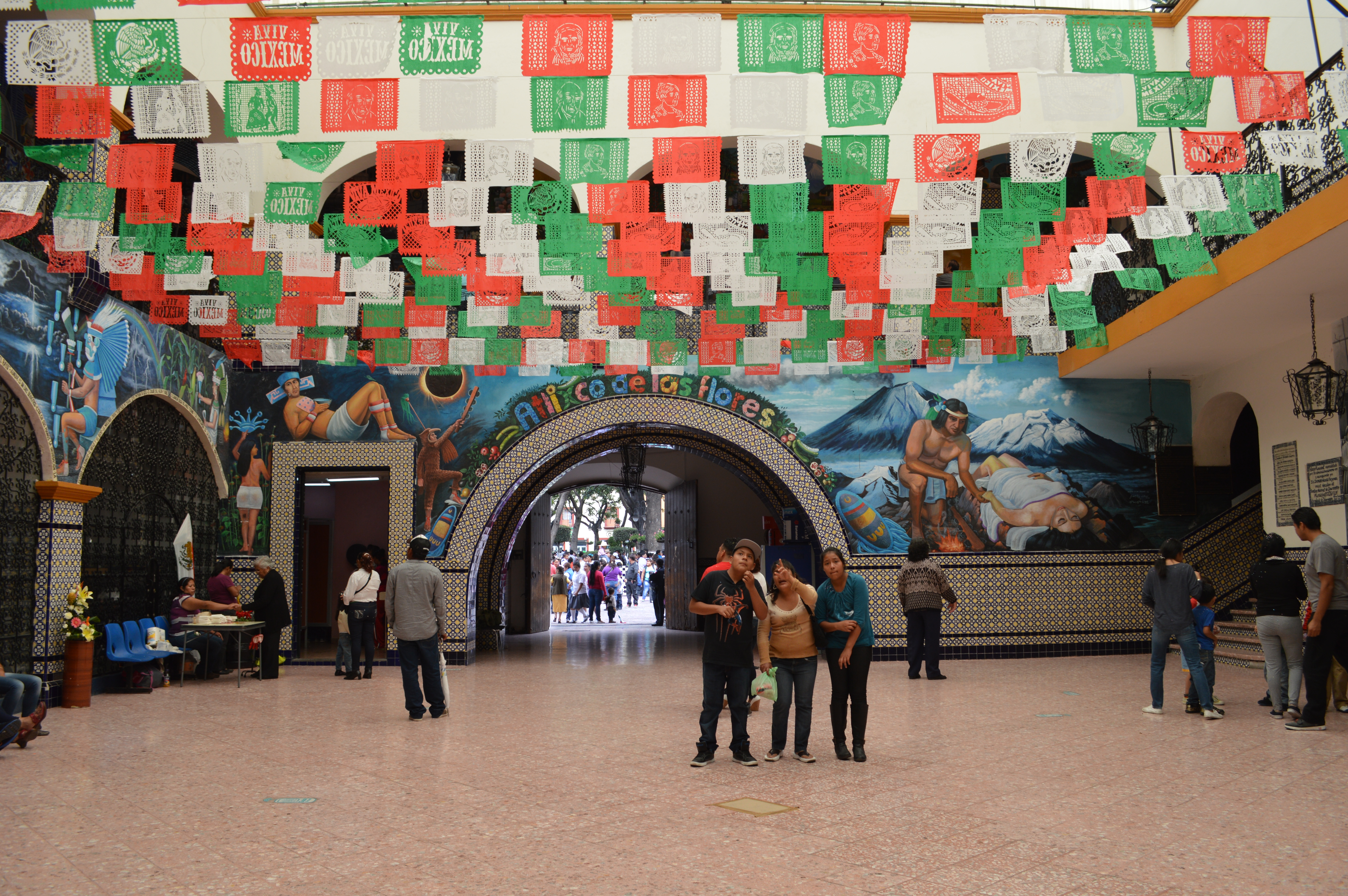
Interior of the municipal palace of Atlixco, Puebla with papel picado celebrating Independence Day.

In precolonial times, Aztec people chiseled spirit figures into bark. They used mulberry and fig tree bark to make a rough paper called amate. This custom evolved later into the art form now known as papel picado. Near the middle of the nineteenth century, Mexican people first encountered tissue paper at hacienda stores and adapted it to the craft. Nowadays, artisans usually layer 40 to 50 layers of tissue paper and punch intricate designs into them using a fierrito, a type of chisel.

== San Salvador Huixcolotla ==
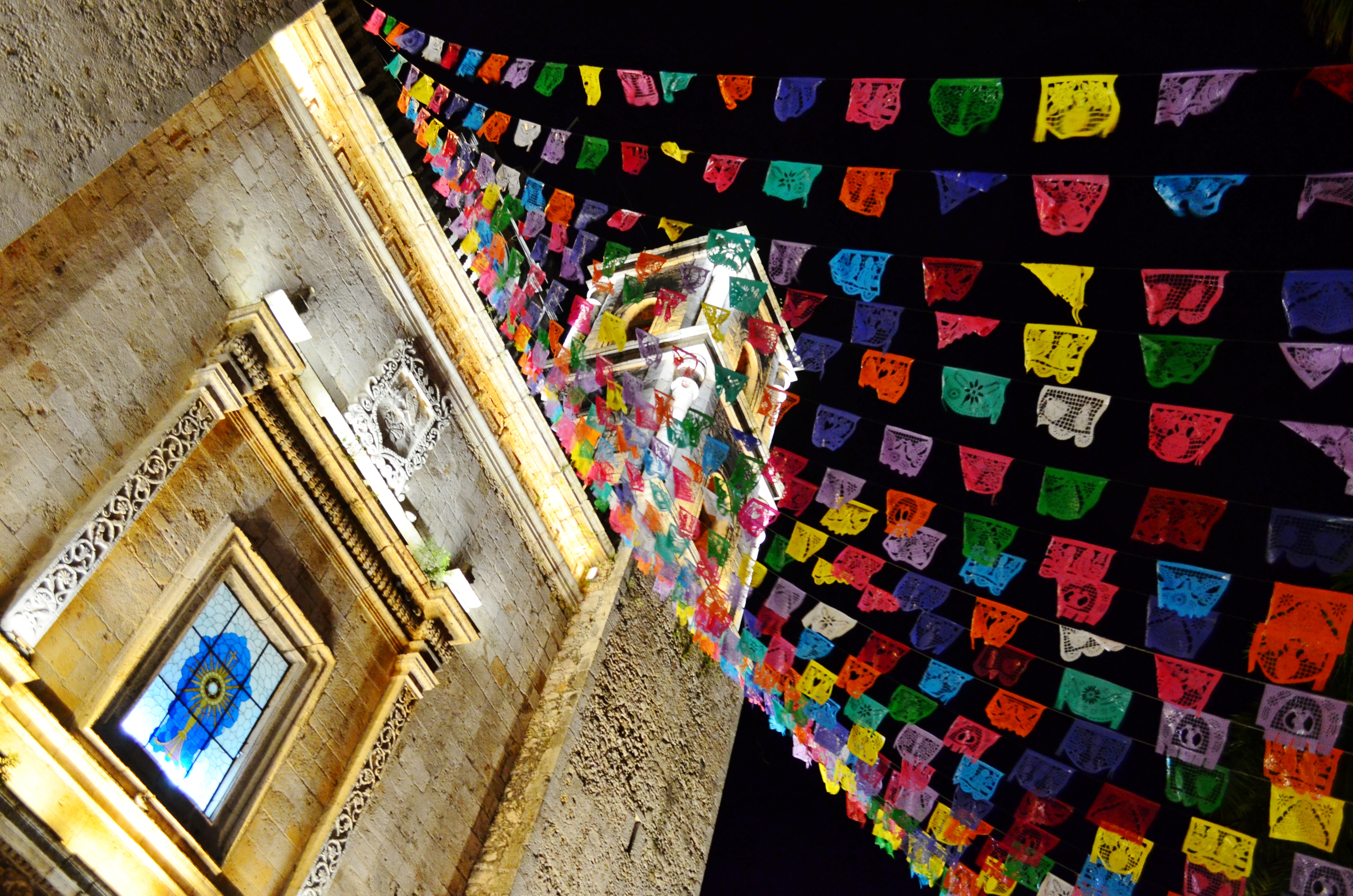
Papel picado coming down from the Church of Saint Servatius in Valladolid, Yucatán.

San Salvador Huixcolotla is a municipality in the Mexican state of Puebla and is considered the birthplace of papel picado. This town is known for having a large community of craftsmen who produce high-quality papel picados.

In Huixcolotla, papel picado is primarily created for the celebrations of the Day of the Dead. However, papel picados are also crafted for many other holidays and special events. It was in Huixcolotla that its townspeople took colorful papel de China (China paper) and began crafting intricate patterns. Over time, the tool used to make papel picado has changed from scissors to chisels because of the greater precision and detailing they allow. Traditionally, the art of making papel picado has been passed from generation to generation. By 1970, it became common for those in Mexico to decorate their streets with papel picado and their altars during the Day of the Dead. Around 1930, the art form spread from Huixcolotla to other parts of Mexico such as Puebla and Tlaxcala. Sometime in the 1960s, papel picado spread to Mexico City and thence to the United States and Europe.

== Production ==
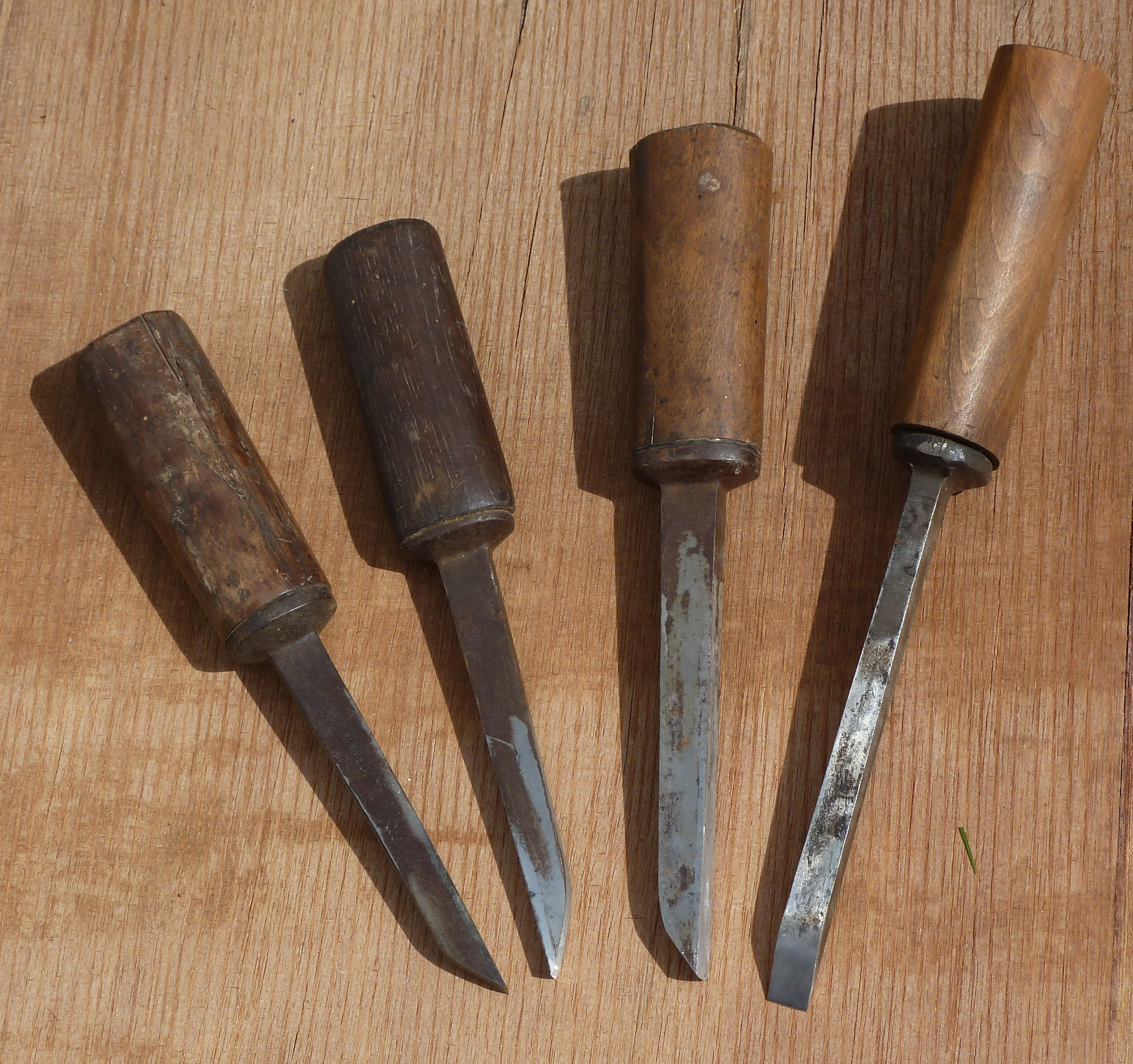
A variety of fierritos, or chisels, that can be used to craft designs into a variety of materials, such as tissue paper.

Traditionally, papel picados are crafted entirely by hand.

When crafting a papel picado, the first step is to draw out the selected design onto the paper and then cover the paper with transparent plastic; this will protect the original drawing. To produce multiple copies at once, one stacks 40 to 50 sheets of tissue paper and staples them together. Using a small mallet and chisels with variously shaped tips, the artist then cuts out pieces of the paper from the stack. This technique allows the carving of a design to be multiplied.

The stack is then separated, with each sheet of paper being a papel picado. Each sheet in the stack is identical. Afterwards, papel picados (or "banderitas") are typically hung with strings or attached to wooden dowels.

=== Materials ===
The primary materials to make a traditional papel picado are tissue paper (papel de seda), a stencil, a small mallet, and chisels. However, papel picados can also be made using rice or silk paper, and have been known to be cut with scissors or a craft knife.

== Cultural significance ==
The Ministry of Tourism and Culture officially recognizes and supports the art of papel picado. In 1998, the governor of the state of Puebla decreed that the style of papel picado produced in San Salvador Huixcolota is part of the cultural heritage of the state of Puebla (Patrimonio Cultural del Estado de Puebla).

== Types ==
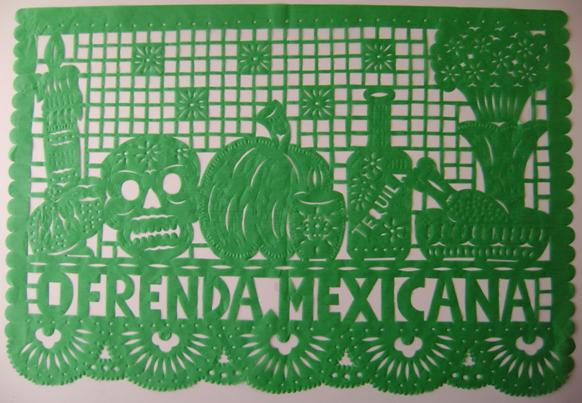
A Day of the Dead themed papel picado created for an ofrenda.

With countless combinations of patterns and colors, there are many different types of papel picados used in Mexican celebrations. Specific patterns of papel picados are believed to hold significant meaning and worldly influence. Thus, the design that is cut into a papel picado is determined by the particular event of which it is displayed.

=== Day of the Dead ===
One of the most recognizable types of papel picados are those hung during the Mexican holiday Dia de Muertos (Day of the Dead, 1 November). Papel Picados used in Dia de Muertos are often cut with patterns of skulls and strung around altars (ofrendas). Ofrendas highlight the four elements of the earth: fire, water, Earth, and air, of which papel picados represent air.

=== Christmas ===
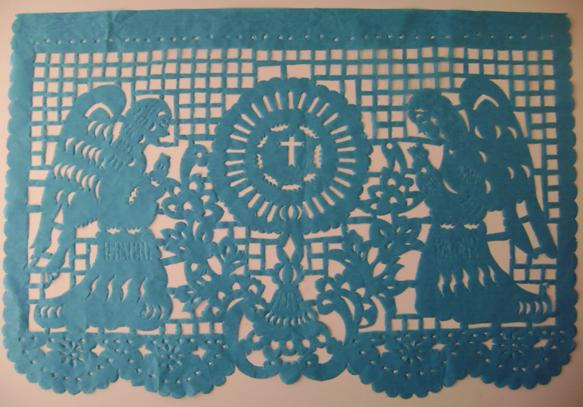
A papel picado with the pattern of two angels praying before the Eucharist.

Papel picados made for Christmas are traditionally done with red or green tissue paper and with patterns of people and or objects relating to the holiday such as baby Jesus, angels, the Virgin Mary, Christmas trees, and bells.

==== Weddings ====
When crafted for weddings, papel picados are usually done on white tissue paper and engraved with patterns such as doves, hearts, churches, and wedding cakes. Moreover, these types of papel picado are crafted in a way to resemble white lace.

==== Cut paper figures ====
Papel picados are also used to assist in one's life journey.

It is believed that if someone wanted to improve a relationship, better their crops, or receive assistance in a particular area of their life, they would go to the shaman (someone thought to have contact with the spirits) who would cut a figure into a papel picado themed to the person's specific need, which would help their situation. For the papel picados to do their job of assisting in one's life, they must be placed either on the family altar or in a more specific area, depending on the particular purpose of the papel picado.

== Notable papel picado artists ==
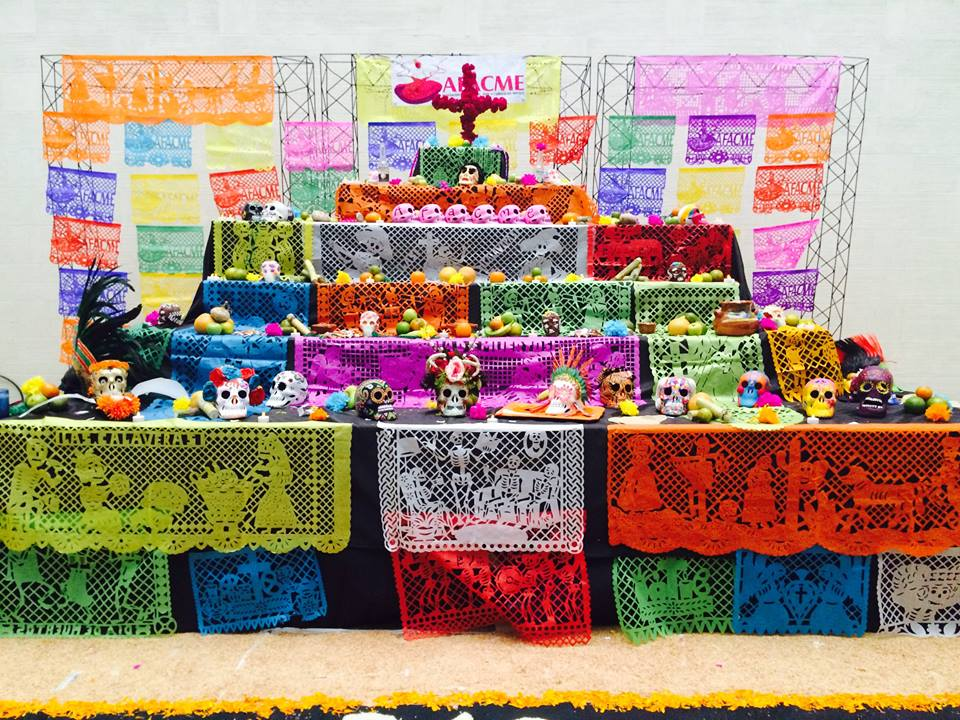
Dia de Muertos offering at the Mexico City Campus of the Tec de Monterrey incorporating papel picado

- Olga Ponce Furginson (born 1918) is an artist who grew up in Mexico and, after graduating from Woodbury University in Burbank, California and staying in the United States, has opened several exhibits and has had some of her artwork featured in films and television shows.
- Carmen Lomas Garza (born 1948) is a successful artist and author who is of Mexican-American descent. She is mainly known for her paintings and papel picado, and her artwork has been featured in the Smithsonian American Art Museum, the National Museum of Mexican Art, and many other museums.
- Margaret Sosa (born 1948) graduated from California State University, Los Angeles and has studied papel picado for over three decades. She worked under master papel picado artist Olga Ponce Furginson, and her artwork can now be found in exhibits around the world.
- Margaret 'Quica' Alarcón (born 1969) was raised in East Los Angeles and now lives a life as an artist and teacher. Her artwork has been featured in many museums such as the Palos Verdes Art Center, Galeria Otra Vez in Self Help Graphics & Art, and Avenue 50 Studio.
- Herminia Albarrán Romero is a Mexican-American artist who is best known for her papel picado, of which she learned to make at a young age. In 2005, she received the United States' highest honor in the folk and traditional arts—the National Heritage Fellowship from the National Endowment for the Arts (NEA).
- Catalina Delgado Trunk (born 1945) grew up in Mexico City and now resides in Albuquerque, New Mexico. Her artwork has been featured in museums such as the Smithsonian's National Museum of the American Indian and the Museum of Contemporary Art in Kanazawa, Japan.
- Kathleen Trenchard is an author and artist who specializes in papel picado and teaches painting, drawing, and art appreciation out of her studio in San Antonio, Texas.
- Beatriz Vasquez is an artist in Indianapolis, Indiana. She teaches students all over the state about the traditional art of Papel Picado. She has/had pieces featured in the Indiana State Museum, Kurt Vonnegut Museum and Library and the Children’s Museum of Indianapolis.

== See also ==
- Bunting (textile)
- Chad (paper) left over fragments from the cutting.
- Kurpie paper cutout
- Scherenschnitte
- Paper cutting
- Prayer flag
