= Beatriz Vasquez =

American artist

- Born: Brownsville, Texas
- Education: Herron School of Art
- Style: Papel picado
- Awards: 2020 DeHaan Artist of Distinction

Beatriz Vasquez is a Mexican-American artist and self-proclaimed artivist based in Indianapolis, Indiana. Vasquez practices papel picado, a traditional Mexican artform created through the cutting and hanging of paper for the purpose of decoration. Throughout her artistic career, she has cut large-scale papel picado artworks as well as paper clothing and sculpture. Vasquez is a U.S. Artist Ambassador with the Art in Embassies Program under U.S. Ambassador Maria Brewer in Maseru Lesotho, Africa. Vasquez participated in a one-week intensive programing creating international connections through her art practice, led cultural art forums with Lesotho Artists and learned from indigenous artisans of African culture. Vasquez is a bilingual teaching artist with Arts for Learning Indiana Art with a Purpose and Asante Art Institute, and taught her practice at institutions such as the Indianapolis Children's Museum, the Herron School of Art and Design, the Eiteljorg Museum, Gallery 924, the Richmond Art Museum, Indianapolis Public Schools and the Kurt Vonnegut Museum and Library.

== Early life and education ==
Vasquez was born and raised in the town of Brownsville, Texas, on the border between Mexico and America while also spending much of her time with family in Matamoros, Mexico. First inspired to purse the arts by her grandfather, a master carpenter in Mexico who taught his craft to the youth, Vasquez went on to attend the Herron School of Art and Design, graduating in 2006 with a BFA in general fine arts with a focus on illustrating children's books. At Herron, Vasquez was not taught the art of papel picado. Instead, she picked up the indigenous craft after visiting her family in Mexico post-graduation and went on to put her own spin on the practice by utilizing an X-ACTO knife instead of the traditional tools of nails and hammers.

== Career ==
On October 31, 2015, Vasquez has held Papel Picado Inspired workshops for several years in the Eiteljorg Museum's Dia de los Muertos event in which she worked with attendees to create paper artworks and displayed her own papel picado piece. In 2015, her piece "La Santa Frida" was featured in the background of the Gregory Hancock Dance Theatre performance of La Casa Azul, a play based on Frida Kahlo's diaries.

Vasquez's solo exhibit, "Feminine Bloodlines, Mexican Womanhood: Erasing Submissiveness", opened on February 7, 2020, at the Indianapolis Arts Council's Gallery 924. This show displayed a body of Vasquez's papel picado works that focused on the empowerment of women in the present era while addressing historically and culturally significant topics such as the Aztecs and ICE. This exhibit was influenced by Vasquez's residency with the IUPUI Arts and Humanities Institute in her hometown of Brownsville where she was able to visit her family for the first time in 15 years and witness what life was like for those on the border seeking asylum. The show was scheduled to finish on March 27, 2020.

Vasquez's solo exhibit, "Hope & Loss — A Border Elegy" at the Herron School of Art & Design's Marsh Gallery, opened on March 11, 2020. This show featured papel picado pieces that addressed topics such as detention centers along the border, immigration, and the construction of the Mexico-United States border wall by the Trump administration. All events associated with this exhibit were cancelled due to the coronavirus pandemic.

In 2020 Vasquez also contributed to the works featured in the Indy Art & Seek, a partnership between Keep Indianapolis Beautiful and the Arts Council of Indianapolis. The project utilized an app to provide users with a self-guided art tour of the Indianapolis area. Vasquez created two pieces for this project: "Monarch Sanctuary" and "Monarchs Are Immigrants". The works were intended by the artist to provide an inviting space for immigrants in the Christian Park area of Indianapolis. In the same year Vasquez became the 2020 recipient of the DeHaan Artist of Distinction Award.

In 2022, the Indiana State Museum opened the exhibit "Collecting Indiana: Recent Art Acquisitions" in order to display 26 newly acquired art pieces with no specified theme. This show included Vasquez's 7-foot-by-9 papel picado piece, "Mother Nature All Dressed Up", which was inspired by the four Midwestern seasons as well as a traditional Mexican dress.

As one of the 2022–2023 visiting artists at the Indianapolis Children's Museum, Vasquez was responsible for hosting a wearable arts workshop where children and families were able to create their own wearable paper pieces to take home. While Vasquez was exhibiting at the Indiana States Museum and Children's Museum, she also had her work presented in the Kurt Vonnegut Museum and Library's Immigrant Experience.

On October 7, 2023, Vasquez had a solo show of her papel picado artwork at the Richmond Art Museum in Richmond, Indiana.
