= Andrés Ulises Castillo Villarreal =

Mexican serial killer

Andrés Castillo
- Born: Andrés Ulises Castillo Villarreal; 1980 (age 45–46); Chihuahua City, Chihuahua, Mexico
- Other names: "The Chihuahua Ripper" "The Urban Development Ripper"
- Conviction: Murder
- Penalty: 120 years imprisonment

Details
- Victims: 3–12+
- Span of crimes: 2009–2015
- Country: Mexico
- State: Chihuahua
- Date apprehended: January 6, 2016

Andrés Ulises Castillo Villarreal (born 1980) is a Mexican serial killer, who was active in his hometown of Chihuahua City. He raped and murdered at least three men, as well as raping a teenager between 2009 and 2015. He confessed to around 12 murders, earning him the nicknames The Chihuahua Ripper and The Urban Development Ripper. He can be classified as an organized, sedentary and hedonistic murderer motivated by sexual compulsion. He was sentenced to 120 years imprisonment in 2017.

== Modus operandi ==
Castillo, who was a bricklayer and a narcomenudista (a small-time drug dealer), attracted his victims (young men who used methamphetamines) with the promise of giving them drugs. He then drove them to secluded places on the outskirts of town or his own home, where he would drug and intoxicate them. Afterwards, he would hit them on the head with a blunt object to first incapacitate and rape them, before hitting them on the head to kill them. The bodies would then always be dismembered with a bow-style hand saw. Castillo would transport the remains in a wheelbarrow and abandon them in vacant places, where he would either hide them partially or bury them completely. It is known that at least one of Castillo's victims was buried under the floor of his house. Additionally, he would always leave toys next to the mutilated bodies as a "signature".

== Confirmed victims ==
=== Murder of Lorenzo Ernesto Olivas Barrios ===
Castillo's first identified victim was Lorenzo Ernesto Olivas Barrios, a 22-year-old man from Delicias, who had moved months before his death to the city of Chihuahua to work in a food company. He lived with relatives in Colonia Vista Hermosa before disappearing on November 13, 2015, saying to a relative that he was going to buy "some dinner", but never returned. Three days later, on November 16, his relatives reported his disappearance; they would not hear any news about him until the following day, when the dismembered remains of a man were found by some neighbors of the Urban Development Company.

The arms and legs were found inside an abandoned house on Novena and San Abel Streets. Two days later, the torso and head were found on nearby streets, Once and Álamos, partially hidden inside a tree trunk at the bottom of a dry stream. Above the remains, a front half of a tricycle was found. DNA tests confirmed the victim's identity. According to subsequent inquiries, it was determined that on the night of November 13, Olivas had gone to a bar called "California" on Nueva España Street and R. Alameda, where he met with Castillo. Olivas accompanied Castillo to his home on Ninth Street in the same neighborhood. After consuming methamphetamines, Castillo assaulted, raped and murdered Olivas, hitting his head with a hammer until his skull was destroyed. After dismembering the body in the bathroom, Castillo coerced a teenager, under threats of killing him, to help transport the remains. They then returned to Castillo's home on Ninth Street, where they cleaned and painted the blood-stained walls. Castillo later raped the teenager.

=== Murder of Daniel Alfonso Rodríguez Morales ===
On December 13, 2015, more dismembered remains from another man were found in the same stream, very close to where the first ones had been discovered. The body had its legs cut at the knees, which were wrapped in a blanket, with the rest of the body partially hidden in a tree trunk. The skull was smashed with blows to the head, but there were also two wounds by a .22 caliber firearm. Near the body, the rear half of the same tricycle used in the first case was found.

All the similarities between the two findings of Lorenzo Olivas' remains and this new discovery, made it clear that they had been killed by the same person. The victim was identified as Daniel Alfonso Rodríguez Morales, nicknamed "El Troya", a 22-year-old who lived in the same Urban Development neighborhood. He had been seen alive for the last time on the same day his remains were discovered. Two years earlier, Daniel had been arrested for trying to break into a car.

According to the reconstruction of the events following the murder of Lorenzo Olivas, the murderer deceitfully moved to a friend's house located on Álamos Street in the Urban Development neighborhood. He continued to harass the teenager he had previously forced to help him, making him move into his house on December 13. Castillo then invited his new victim to the friend's house, drugged him in front of the host and the teenager, and then proceeded to kill him by hitting him on the head with a rock. He threatened both witnesses with death, forcing them to help dispose of the body.

=== Murder of Fernando Valles Gandarilla ===
The last confirmed victim was Fernando Valles, who disappeared on the same day that Daniel Rodríguez was murdered and his mutilated body found. Fernando was the brother of Jesús Valles Gandarilla, a "friend" of Andrés Castillo, and his primary caretaker, as Jesús had lost both of his legs in an accident. Jesús would declare that he knew that his brother had visited Castillo before his disappearance, but Castillo told him that Fernando had left the house and he did not know where he went. Jesús believed Castillo, thinking that his brother had simply "abandoned" him. In reality, Castillo had drugged, raped and beaten Fernando in the same house where he had killed Daniel Rodríguez. Fernando's body was found on December 18, 2015, under the floor of Castillo's room. Castillo had made a pit to place the body, covering it with rocks and cement. The face and entire skull were destroyed.

== Possible victims ==
Upon his arrest, Andrés Castillo confessed to killing 12 people, but according to the prosecution of Chihuahua, he might be involved in about 20 murders. Some of the victims attributed to the killer are:

- José Urías Hernández: beaten to death, his body was found next to a warehouse on Calle Industrial Sur N#1, on the Robinson Industrial Complex.
- Miguel Ángel Castillo Quintana: 21-year-old man, murdered on August 7, 2015; his killer had hit him on the head to kill him, and he was found on the day of his death in the Ferro-construction warehouse building on Nueva Spain Avenue. He was face down, naked from the waist down.
- Gabriel García Hernández: his dismembered body was found on August 3, 2015, beaten to death.
- Guillermo Juárez Portillo: his mutilated body was found in the Robinson Industrial Complex on May 8, 2015, beaten to death.
- "John Doe": the dismembered body of an unidentified man was found under a bridge on Pacheco Avenue, on November 29, 2014.
- "John Doe": the dismembered body of an unidentified man was found on the railway tracks in the interjection with Pacheco Avenue, on August 2, 2014.
- Gustavo Adrián Saldaña Hernández: his dismembered body was found on Cesar Sandino Street and Francisco Villa Colony on April 3, 2012.
- José Manuel Chavira Olivas: his dismembered body was found on R. Almada and Periférico Neandertal Street, on October 2, 2009.

== Psychiatric profile ==
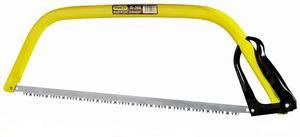
The type of saw that Castillo used for dismembering the bodies of his victims.

Andrés Castillo was characterized by profilers as a psychopath and a classic sexual sadist. It is known that Castillo was the victim of repeated sexual abuse during his childhood, and in the opinion Nicolás González, the fact that all his victims were male and the way in which he committed the murders is a sign of the "emotional charge" of the abuses performed on him. According to criminal profilers, Castillo likely relived his own sexual abuse by reversing roles, transforming from the helpless victim to the perpetrator wielding absolute power.

Within the modus operandi of the Chihuahua Ripper, his obsessive behaviors stand out, particularly his use of the same bow-style hand saw in each homicide and his ritualistic act of leaving toys next to the bodies. According to a hypothesis by specialists at the prosecutor's office, Castillo projected his childhood onto his victims, with the toys representing "the gifts he could have received as a child." A toy could also symbolize an offering to a deceased child's ofrenda.

== Detention and conviction ==
Andrés Castillo was arrested on January 6, 2016, in Vista Cerro Grande colony, while in possession of several doses of methamphetamine. He emphasizes the fact that, in his last crime, he was very careless compared to his previous murders, where he had conducted himself in a methodical way, leaving no evidence and believing that he would never be captured. On December 5, 2017, he was sentenced to 120 years imprisonment.

== See also ==
- List of serial killers by country
- List of serial killers by number of victims
