= Jorge Humberto Martínez Córtez =

Mexican man convicted of murder

- Born: 1978 (age 47–48); Mexico
- Other names: "El Matanovias" "Joy Drago" "Joy Agote"
- Conviction: Murder
- Penalty: Awaiting sentencing

Details
- Victims: 2–3
- Span of crimes: 2011–2014
- Country: Mexico

Jorge Humberto Martínez Córtez (born 1978) is a supposed Mexican murderer and possible serial killer.

== Biography ==
Jorge Humberto Martínez Córtez is suspected of killing 2 to 3 women between 2011 and 2014, as well as an attempted murder against another woman which caused serious injuries. All of his victims were his romantic partners. He was nicknamed "El Matanovias". He strangled all of his victims on whom he used to exercise physical violence and tried to pass off the killings as suicides, cutting hair strands as possible trophies. In his social networks he called himself "Joy Drago" or "Joy Agote", according to leaks to the media - he published threats against several of his victims, such as images of women in an ofrenda or having changed their status to "Widowed" before they died. In 2016, he was denounced for the murder of his last victim but Martínez fled, and a red Interpol file was issued; he was arrested in October 2017, in Izabal, Guatemala. On October 26, 2017, he was charged with murder, and is awaiting sentencing. He has an at least two more charges pending, one for homicide and one for injuries.

== See also ==
- List of serial killers by country
