= Bunting (decoration) =

Festive decorations

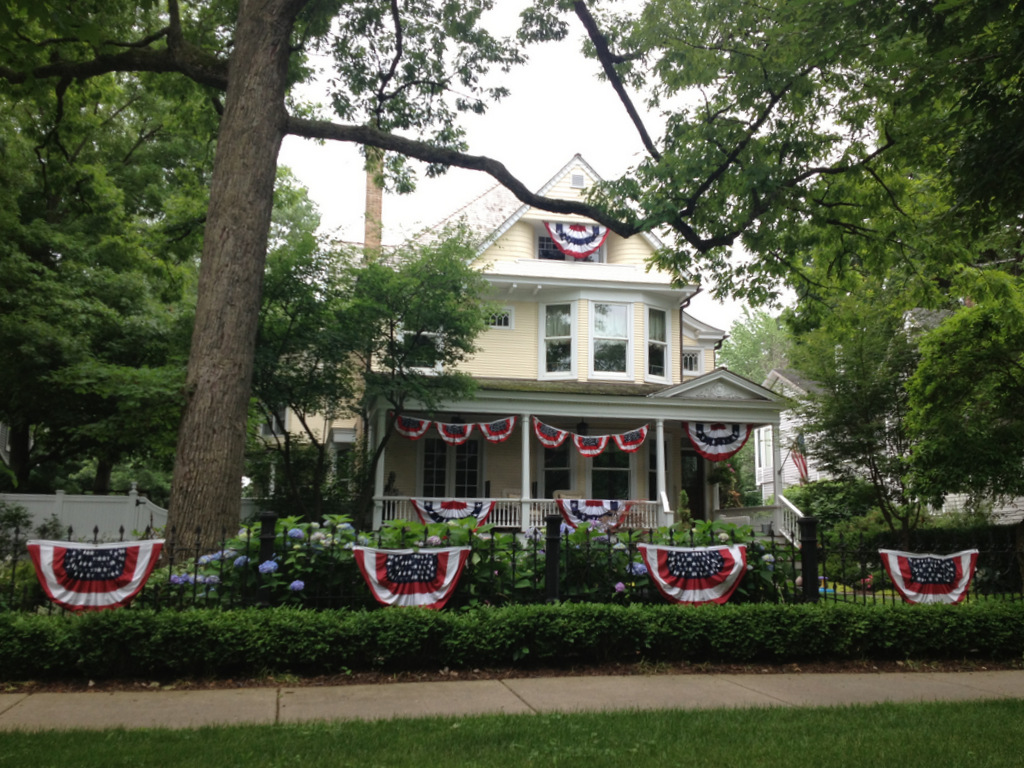
An example of bunting in Wilmette, Illinois

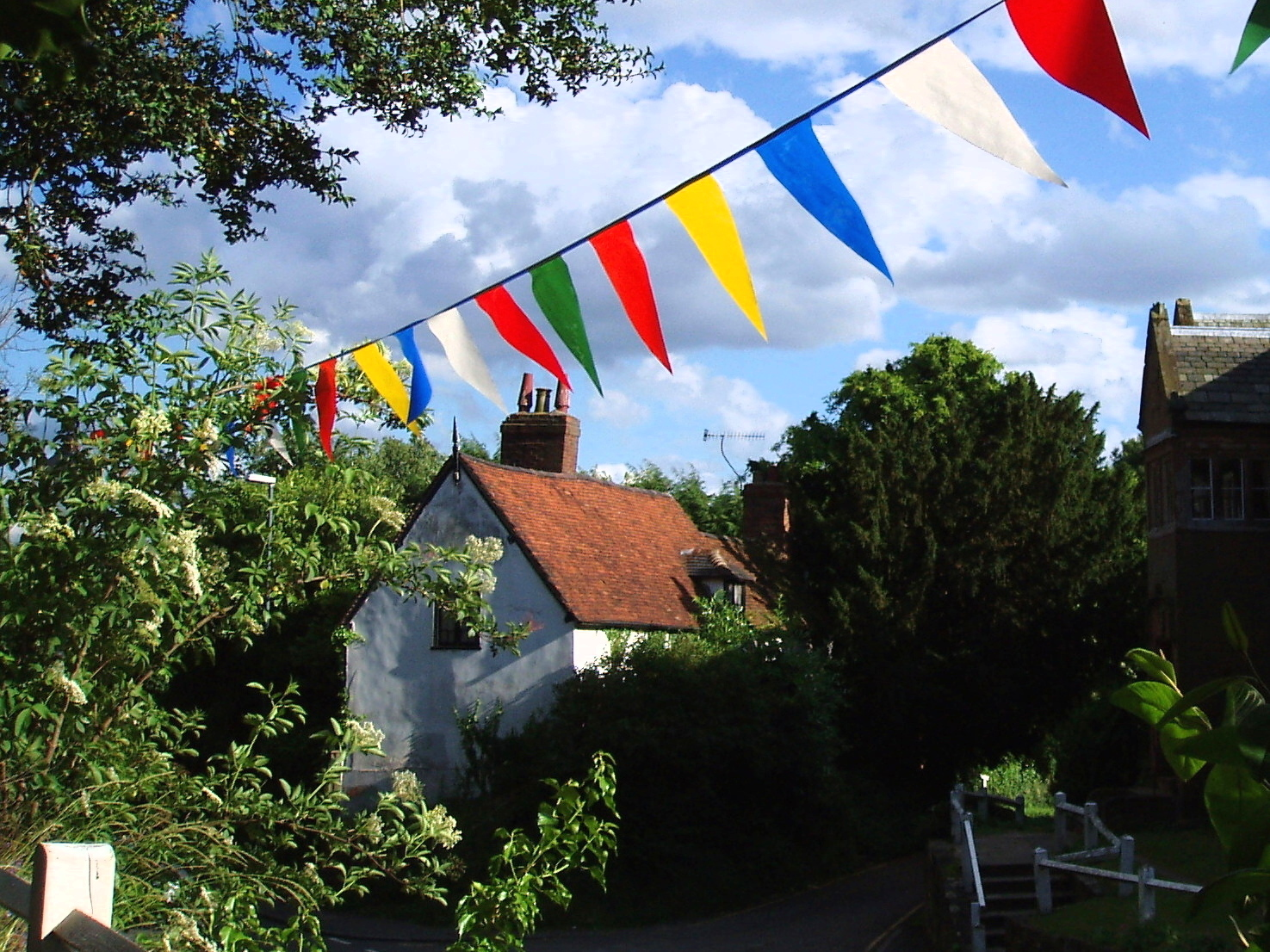
Bunting in the form of triangular flags in the West Midlands, United Kingdom

Bunting refers to decorative flags, wide streamers, or draperies made of fabric, or of plastic, paper or cardboard in imitation of fabric. Bunting is also a collection of flags, and the fabric used to make flags. The fabric was originally a specific type of lightweight worsted wool fabric, but can also be cotton.

== Description ==
Bunting are festive or patriotic decorations made of fabric, or of plastic, paper or cardboard in imitation of fabric. Typical forms of bunting are strings of colorful triangular flags, lengths of fabric in the colors gathered and draped into swags or pleated into fan shapes, draperies, and wide streamers. The colors are often those of national flags. Bunting decorations are used on streets and buildings at special occasions and political events.

The term bunting also refers to a collection of flags, and particularly those of a ship; the officer responsible for raising signals using flags is known as bunts, a term still used for a ship's communications officer. Bunting is also the fabric used to make flags.

== History ==
Bunting textile was originally a specific type of lightweight worsted wool fabric generically known as tammy, manufactured from the turn of the 17th century, and used for making ribbons and flags, including signal flags for the Royal Navy. It may also be cotton. Amongst other properties that made the fabric suitable for ribbons and flags was its high glaze, achieved by a process including hot-pressing.

The origin of the word is uncertain, but bunt means colourful in German.

== Gallery ==
an example of a red, white and blue Bunting used in the United States.

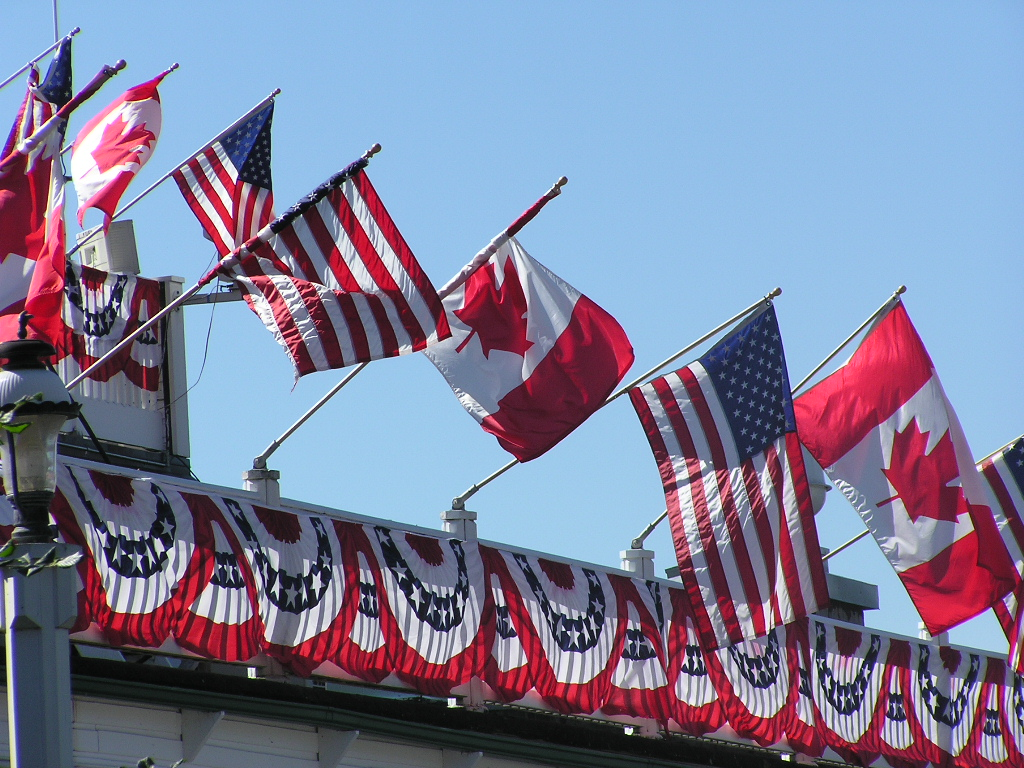
4th of July decorations in Roche Harbor include Canadian and U.S. flags and red, white and blue bunting.

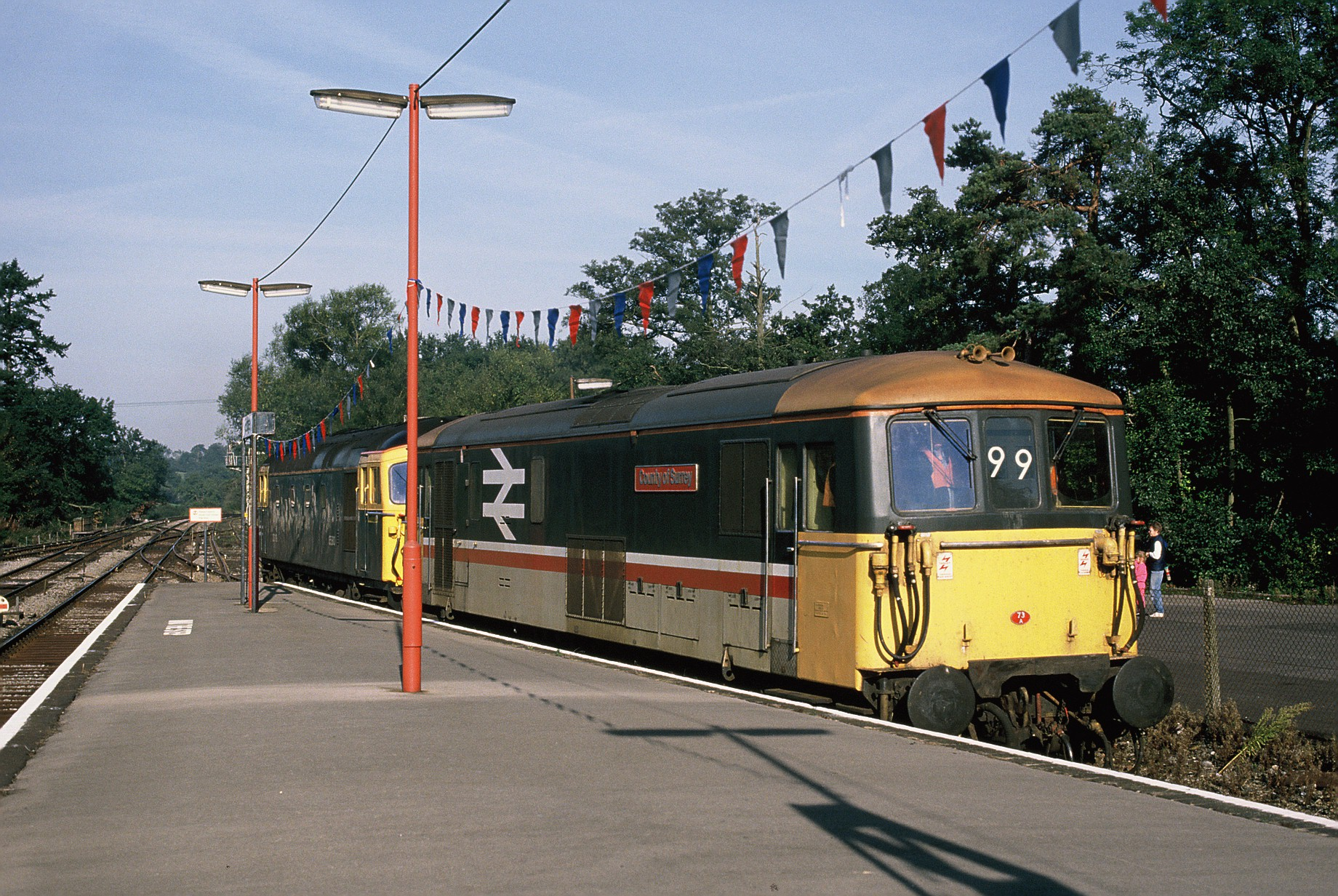
NSE Eridge-Edenbridge celebrations (1988) with Red, White and Blue commemorating the Hundred Years of the Line.

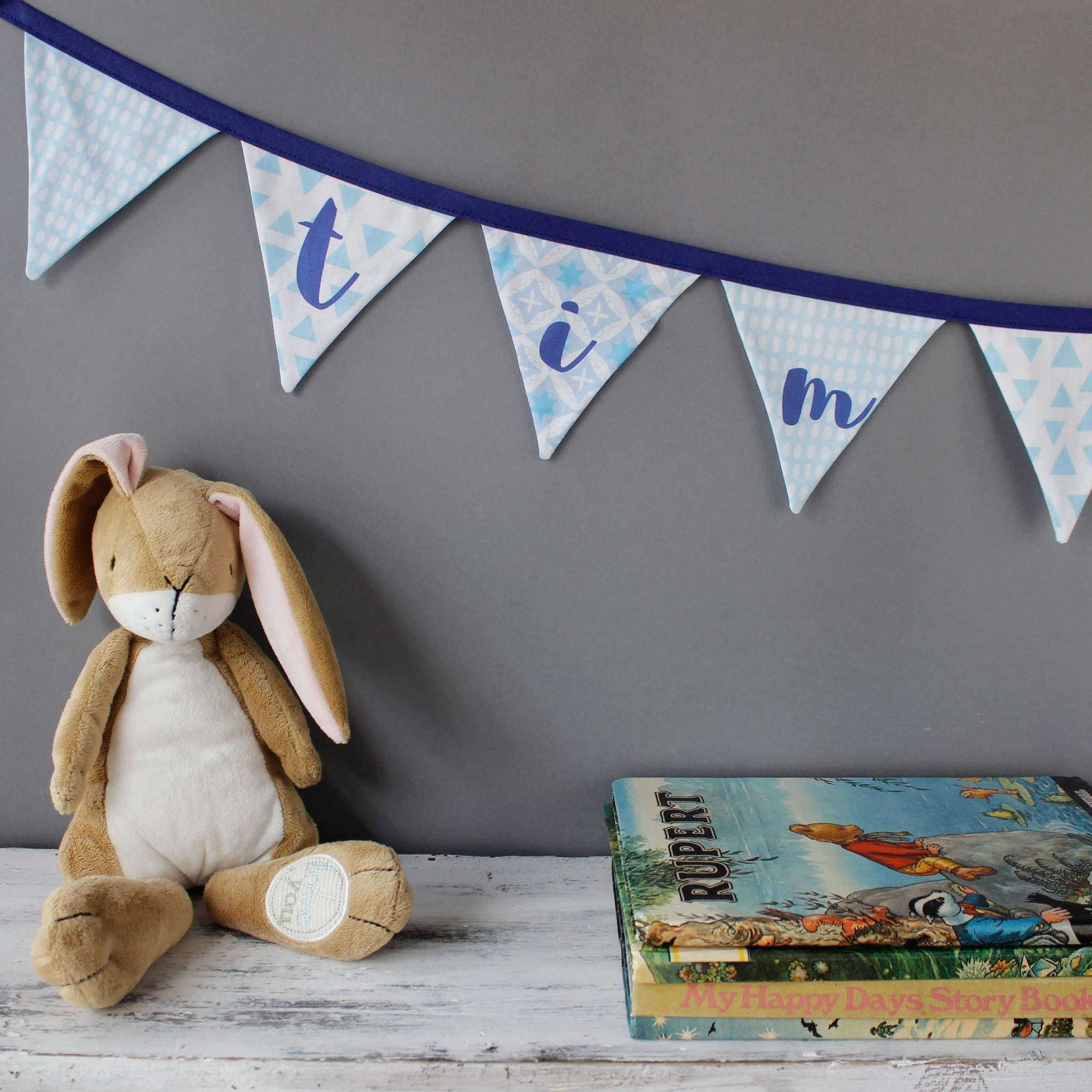
Example of personalised nursery bunting in the UK

== See also ==
- Papel picado
