= The Emelie =

- U.S. National Register of Historic Places
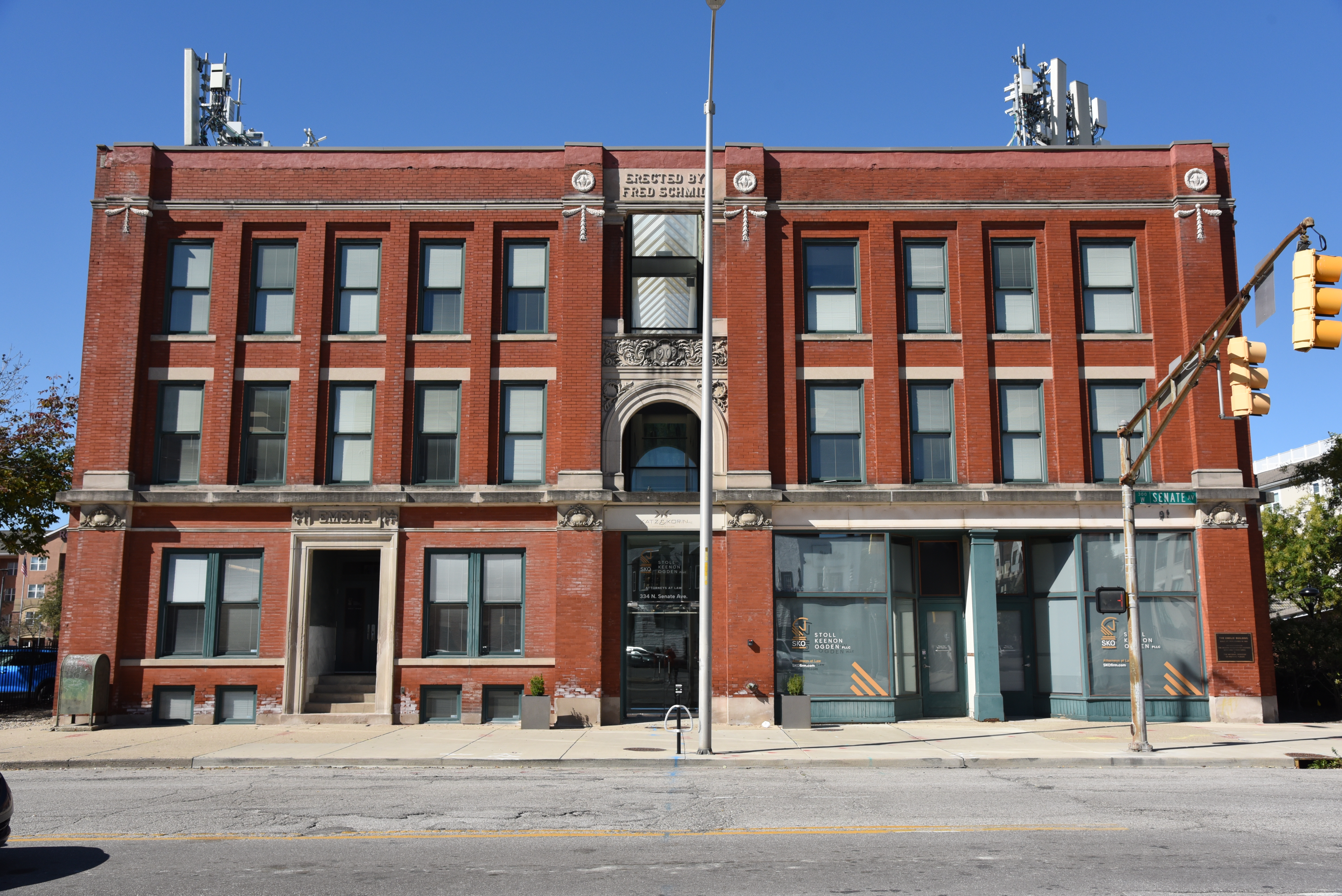
- Front view of the Emelie in 2024

- Location within Indianapolis Location within Indianapolis Location within Indiana Location within the United States
- Location: 49 West Maryland Street, Indianapolis, Indiana
- Coordinates: 39°46′21″N 86°9′48″W
- Area: less than one acre
- Built: 1902
- Architect: Schmid, Frederick
- Architectural style: Renaissance Revival
- MPS: Apartments and Flats of Downtown Indianapolis TR
- NRHP reference No.: 83000068
- Added to NRHP: September 15, 1983

The Emelie is a historic apartment building in Indianapolis, Indiana, United States. It was built in 1902 by German immigrant Frederick Schmid and named for his wife. The building was saved and restored by Browning Day Mullins Dierdorf Architects to serve as the company's corporate headquarters from 1987 to 2003. It is three stories, constructed of red brick and gray limestone. The building also includes a garden level (below ground). It is built in the German Renaissance Revival Architecture style. It has fine decorative detailing, totaling 35,000 square feet (3,300 m^{2}). It has also served as an apartment building and commercial space.

In 2003, the building was sold to Black Orchid Realty. The law firm Katz Korin Cunningham, PC moved to the building in 2004 and donated the use of several of its rooms to the Kurt Vonnegut Museum and Library, which subsequently moved to its current location in January 2019. The space used for the library was the former home of the Indianapolis Museum of Contemporary Art.

In late 2019, Katz Korin Cunningham undertook a massive interior restoration and remodel of the building. In homage to former businesses in the building, the space which had previously housed the Vonnegut Museum was renamed "The Vonnegut Study" and "The Black Orchid Lounge." The Black Orchid was a bar, reputed to have also been a betting parlor, that was one of the businesses that had been housed in the building circa 1970. In 2021, Katz Korin Cunningham placed an historical marker plaque on the building.

The building was placed on the National Register of Historic Places on September 15, 1983.

On July 1, 2022, the law firm of Stoll Keenon Ogden, PLLC moved into the building and currently occupies all floors.

== See also ==
- Apartments and Flats of Downtown Indianapolis Thematic Resources
- National Register of Historic Places listings in Center Township, Marion County, Indiana
