= Indianapolis Contemporary =

Art museum in Indianapolis, Indiana, US (2001–2020)

- Former name: Indianapolis Museum of Contemporary Art
- Established: 2001; 25 years ago
- Dissolved: 2020; 6 years ago
- Location: Indianapolis, Indiana
- Type: Art Museum

Indianapolis Contemporary, formerly known as the Indianapolis Museum of Contemporary Art or iMOCA, was a museum of contemporary art in Indianapolis, Indiana, U.S. In 2020, the gallery's board voted to begin closing down operations, a result of financial strains caused by COVID-19.

== History ==
Founded in 2001 as a “museum without walls”, iMOCA mounted exhibitions around the city. In 2004, the museum opened as a gallery in the historic Emelie Building in the Indiana Avenue Cultural District. In December 2009, iMOCA moved to a larger space in the Murphy Art Center in the Fountain Square Arts District. In 2014, the museum opened a second gallery space in The Alexander Hotel at CityWay.

The iMOCA vacated the Murphy Art Center in late 2016. It continued to offer exhibits in The Alexander Hotel, Cat Head Press in the Englewood neighborhood, Indiana Landmarks, and the Hoosier Salon. In 2018, it announced that it would open a permanent museum in summer 2019 in 2,300 square feet (210 m^{2}) of the old Ford assembly plant at 1301 E. Washington Street on the city's near east side. However, in January 2019 it cancelled plans for a permanent location and stated that it would again be a "museum without walls", with pop-up exhibits at various locations.

Indianapolis Contemporary was the only Indianapolis institution entirely dedicated to showcasing contemporary artists.

Since 2003, iMOCA had presented more than 40 exhibitions featuring the work of more than 75 local, regional, and international artists despite a modest exhibition budget. The museum had partnerships with other organizations such as the Indianapolis Symphony Orchestra and Indianapolis Public Library.
