= Jardín de San Marcos =

Garden in the historic centre of Aguascalientes, Mexico

San Marcos Garden
- Jardín de San Marcos
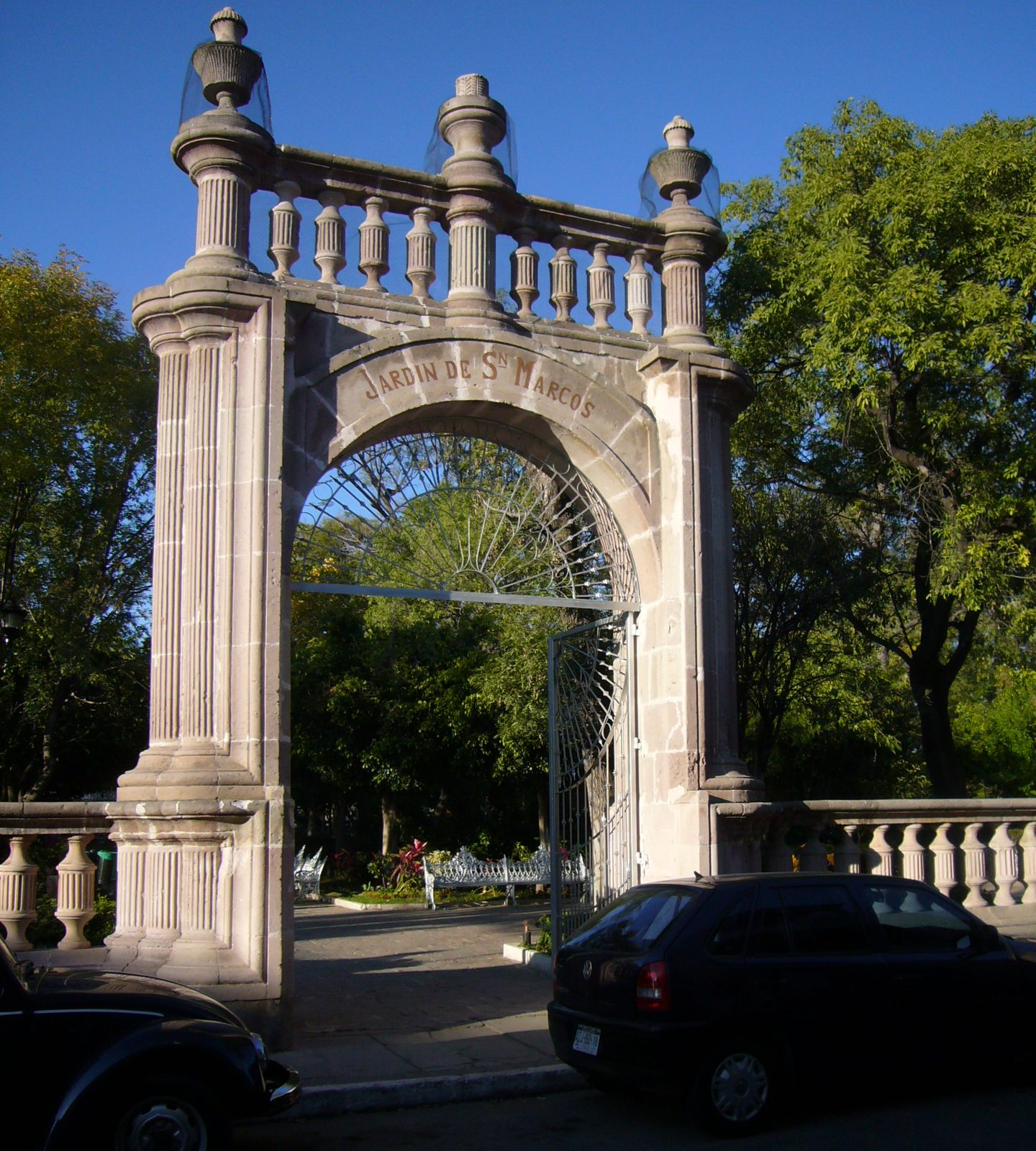
- Garden South Entrance (Manuel M. Ponce Street)
- Interactive map of San Marcos Garden
- Location: Aguascalientes Historic Centre, Aguascalientes City, Aguascalientes, Mexico
- Coordinates: 21.879576°N 102.303240°W
- Open: 3 May 1843
- Status: Operating

The Jardín de San Marcos (English: San Marcos Garden; St. Mark Garden) is a public garden located in the Barrio de San Marcos in the historic centre of Aguascalientes, Aguascalientes, Mexico, Has a various types of plant and tree species. It has paths throughout the garden which have on their sides the iconic bronze statues representatives of the regional culture.

For the 434th Anniversary of the foundation of Aguascalientes City, the Garden would close its doors for a remodeling. It will reopen on October 22, 2009 where some bronze statues would be included which would be placed throughout the Garden representing the residents of the barrio in those years. The garden is used mainly during the Feria Nacional de San Marcos and which also gives the name to this Fair.

== History ==
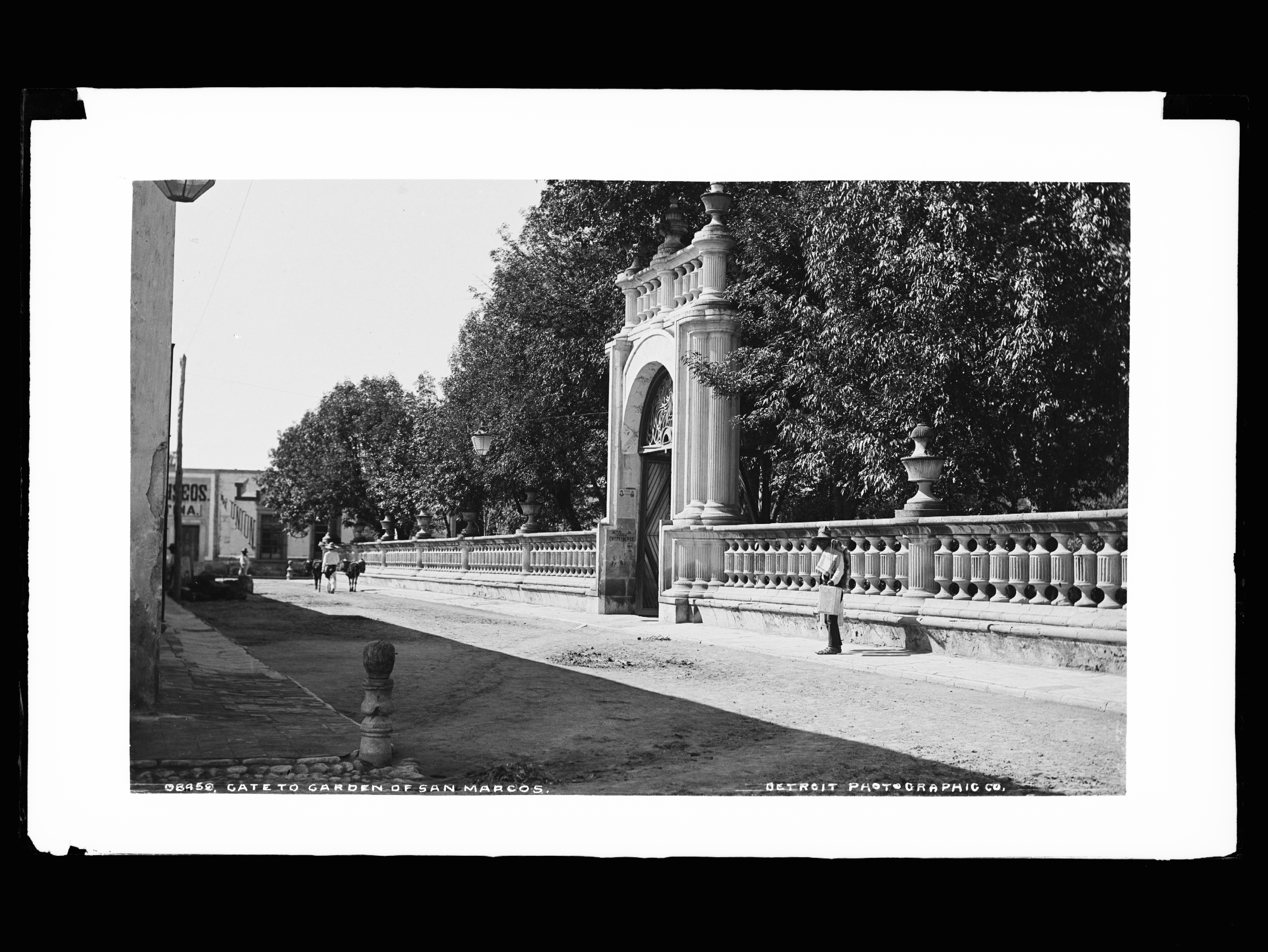
The Gate of Garden of San Marcos (photo by William Henry Jackson, c.1898)

Since the expansion and incorporation of San Marcos to the Aguascalientes City, it only had a small square, the residents would ask the City Council for a larger recreation area to meet the needs of the inhabitants.

On May 3, 1842, the land would be granted to create a park. A central roundabout, a flagpole and some benches surrounded by rose bushes were built on it.

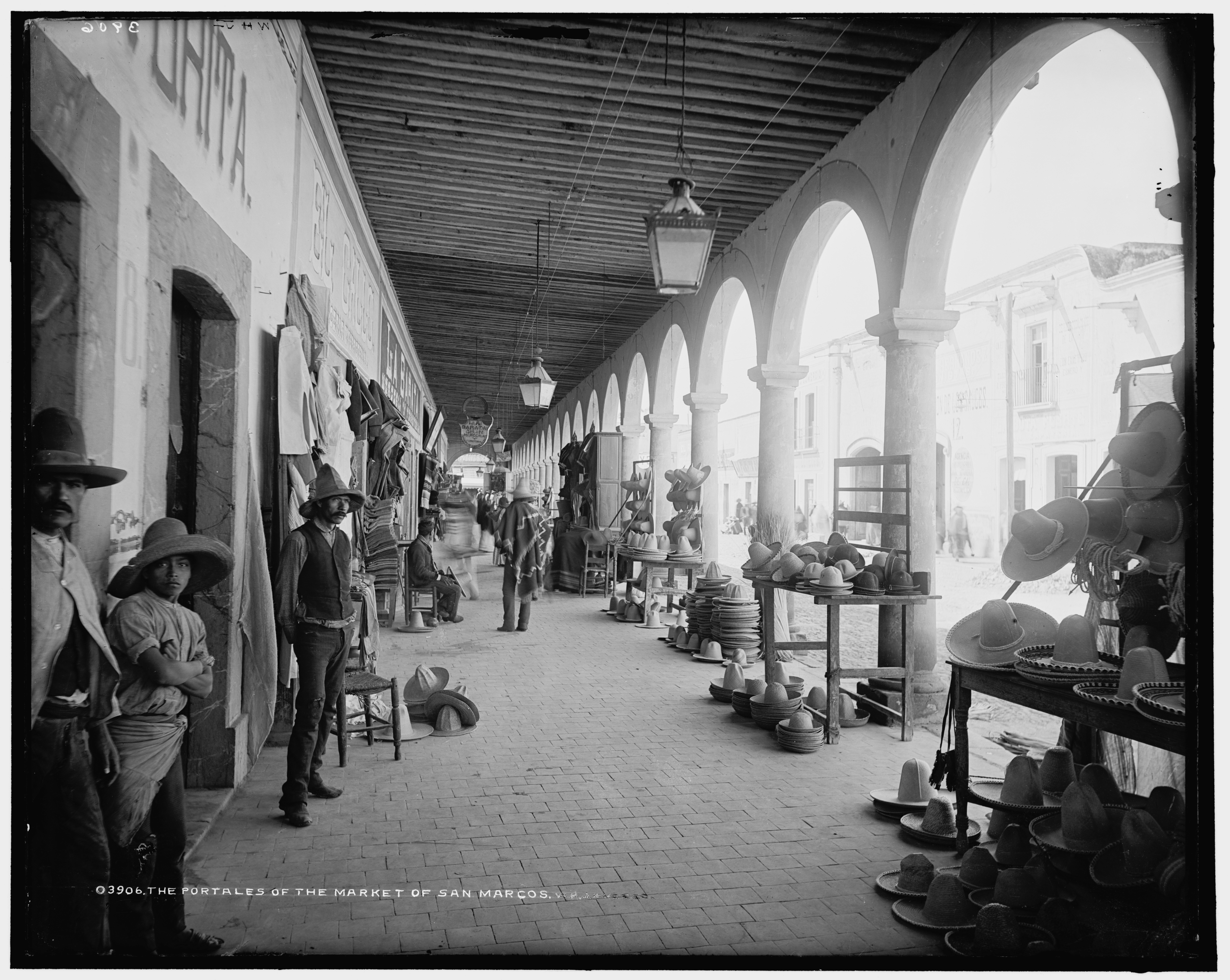
Portales of the Market of San Marcos (by William Henry Jackson)

The construction of the balustrade began in 1842, promoted by the Governor of Aguascalientes Nicolás Condell and the magnum opus would end in 1842. The balustrade is neoclassical in pink quarry, with four entrances, one on each side of the garden, facing the four cardinal points.

In 1887, four fountains distributed in each corner of the garden were added, ninety iron benches were also added. The surface that made up the Garden formed a rectangle, each side measuring 168 meters long by 88 meters wide. The inauguration of the kiosk took place in 1891, being it made of cast iron, twenty vases and a fountain.

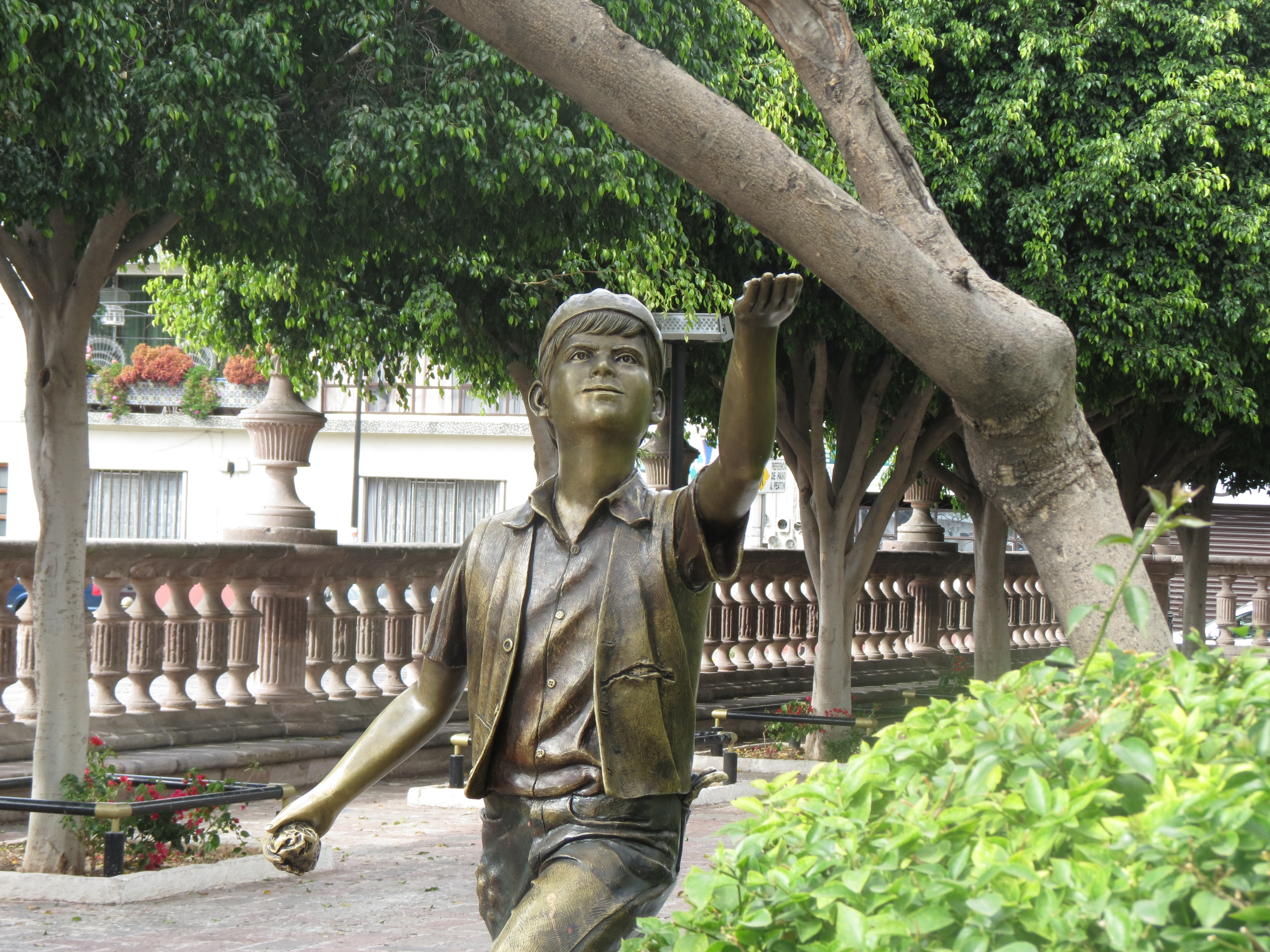
De Pinta [To walk] Sculpture

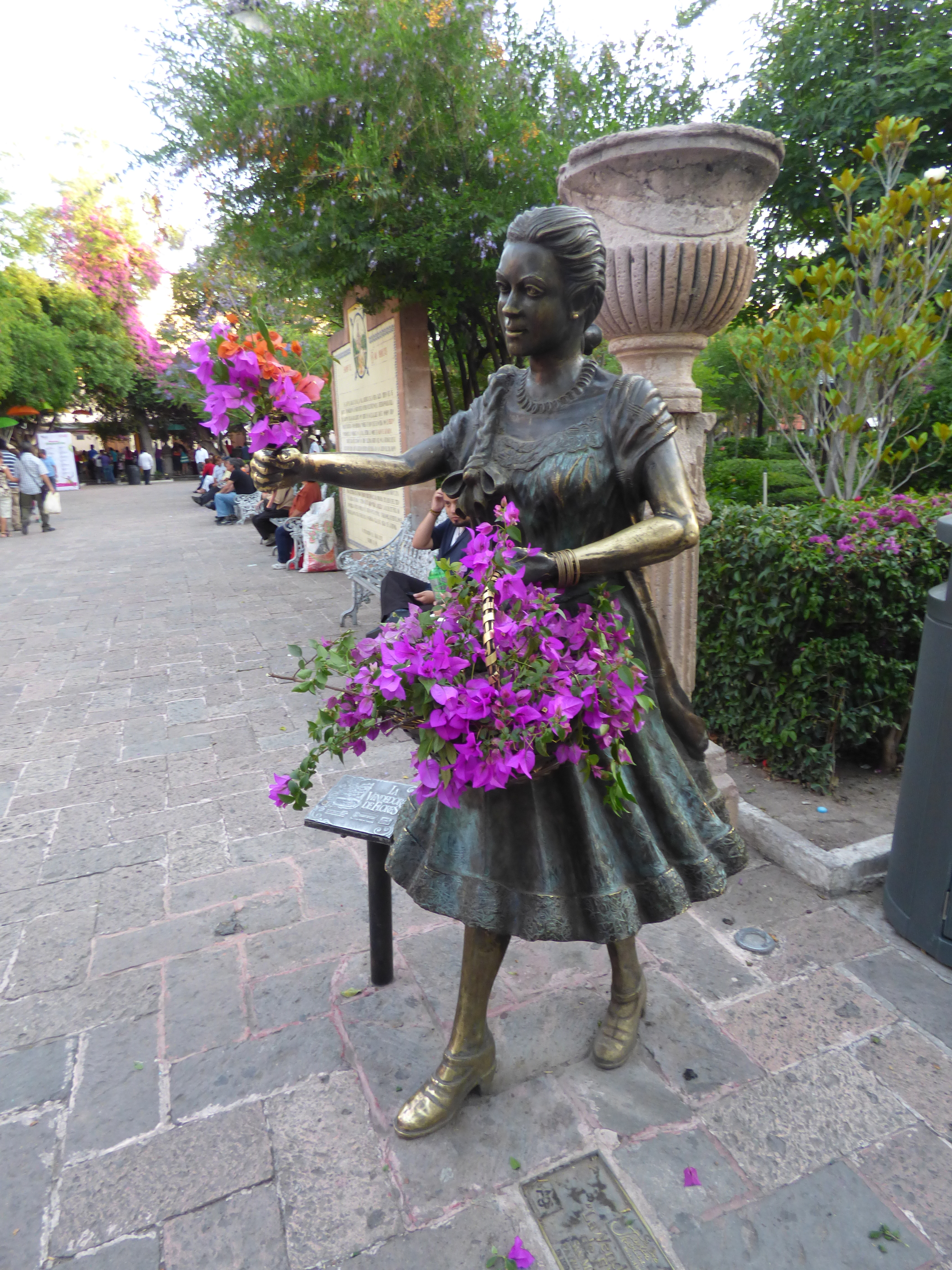
La Vendedora de Flores [The Florist] Sculpture

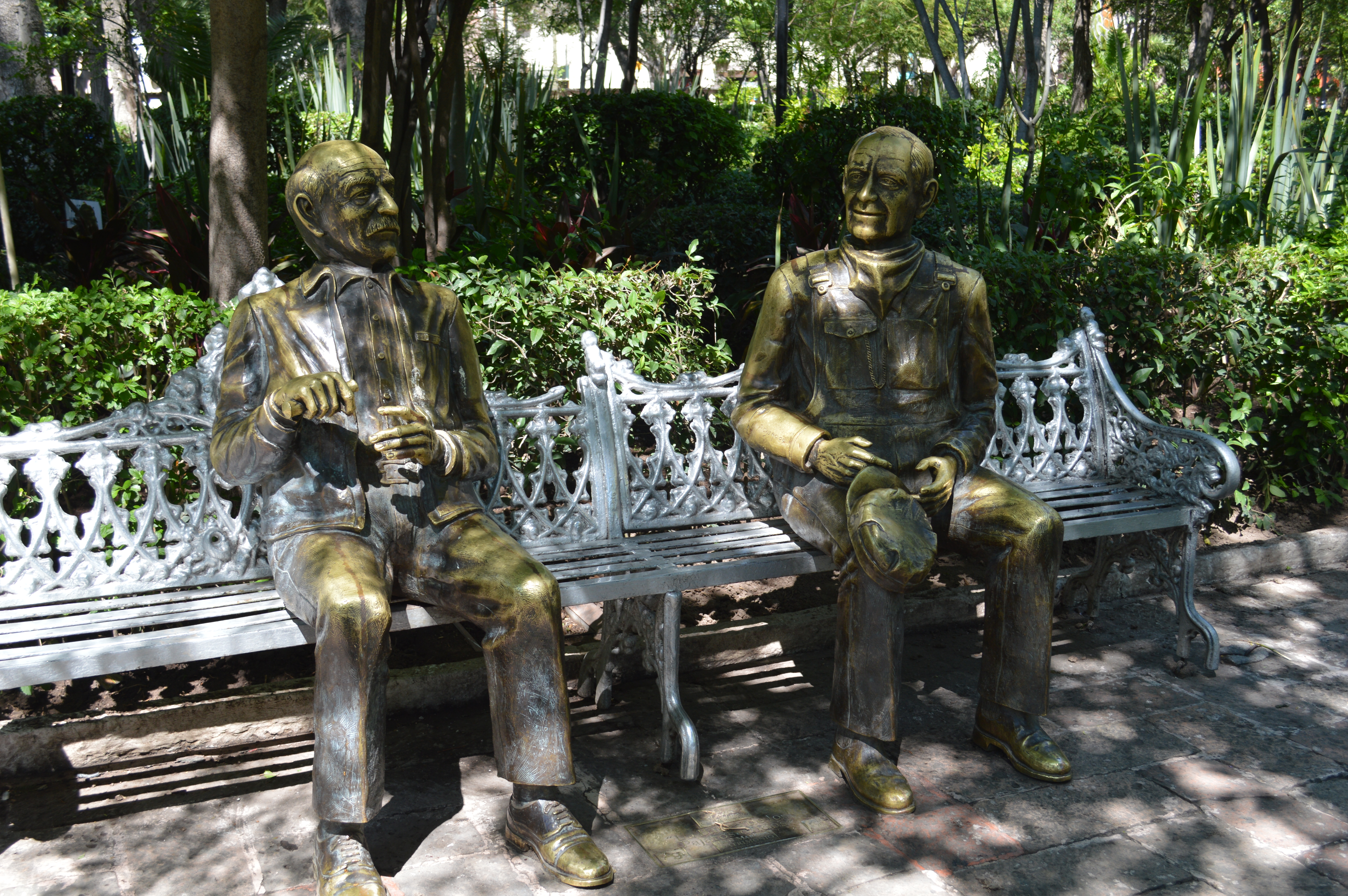
Bench with two sculptures "sitting" on it in the Jardin de San Marcos

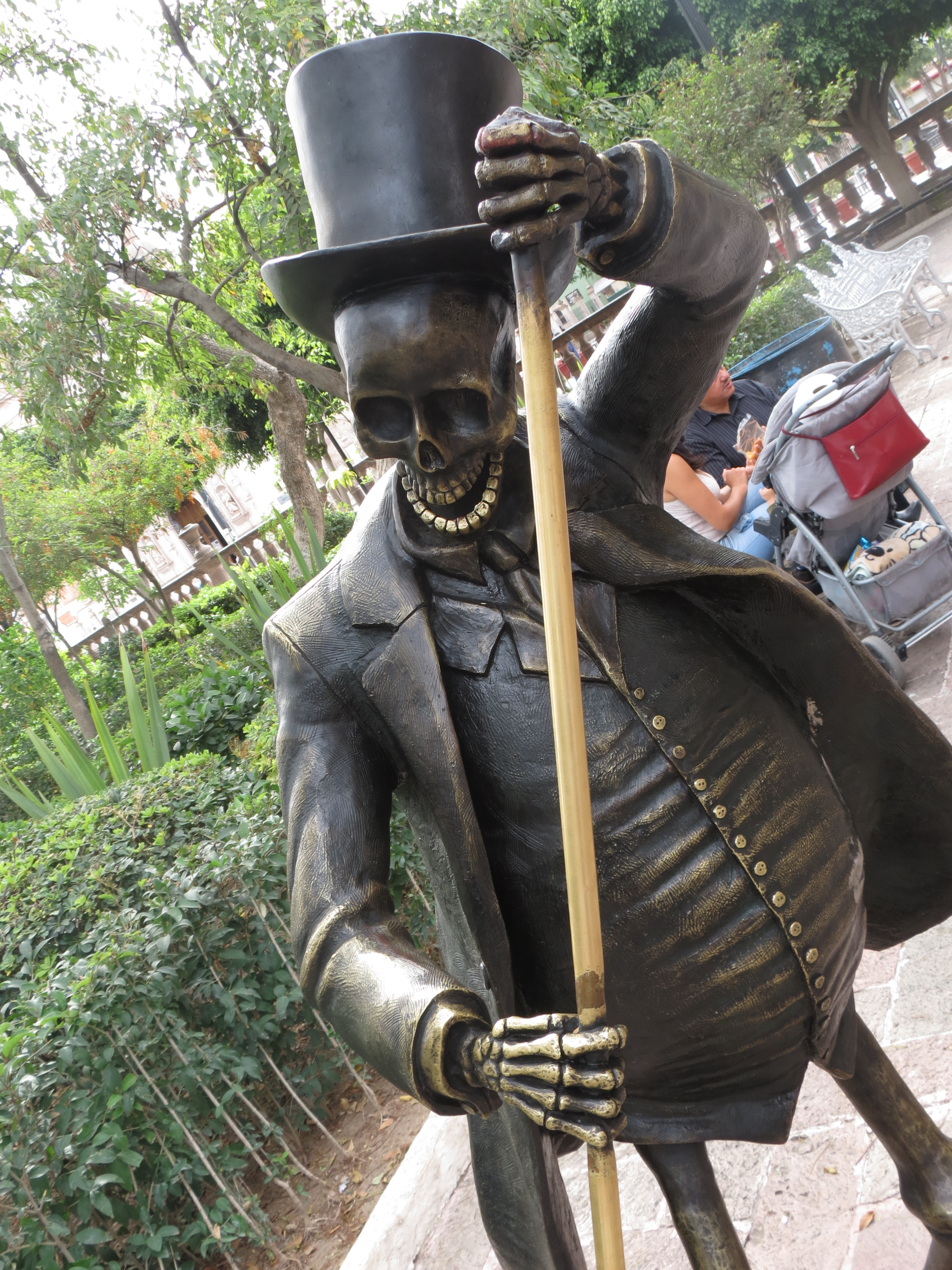
La Muerte [The Death] of Guadalupe Posada

On October 22, 2009, it was extensively remodeled. One of the most relevant transformations of the garden was the placement of bronze sculptures that represented the inhabitants of Aguascalientes from the old Barrio. Inside the sculptures there is a flower seller, children playing, galleros, boleros, bullfighters and others. some statues based on works by prominent Aguascalientes artists such as Saturnino Herrán and José Guadalupe Posada.

== In the culture ==
- The architect Mario Pani during the construction of the Conjunto Urbano Nonoalco Tlatelolco (Nonoalco Tlatelolco Urban Complex) would build an exact replica of the San Marcos, called the Jardín Santiago, due to their accuracy these gardens are known as Los Jardines Gemelos (The Twin Gardens).
- The Aguascalientes-based dairy company, Leche San Marcos owes its name to both the garden and the neighborhood.
