= Ofrenda =

Traditional home altar in Mexico

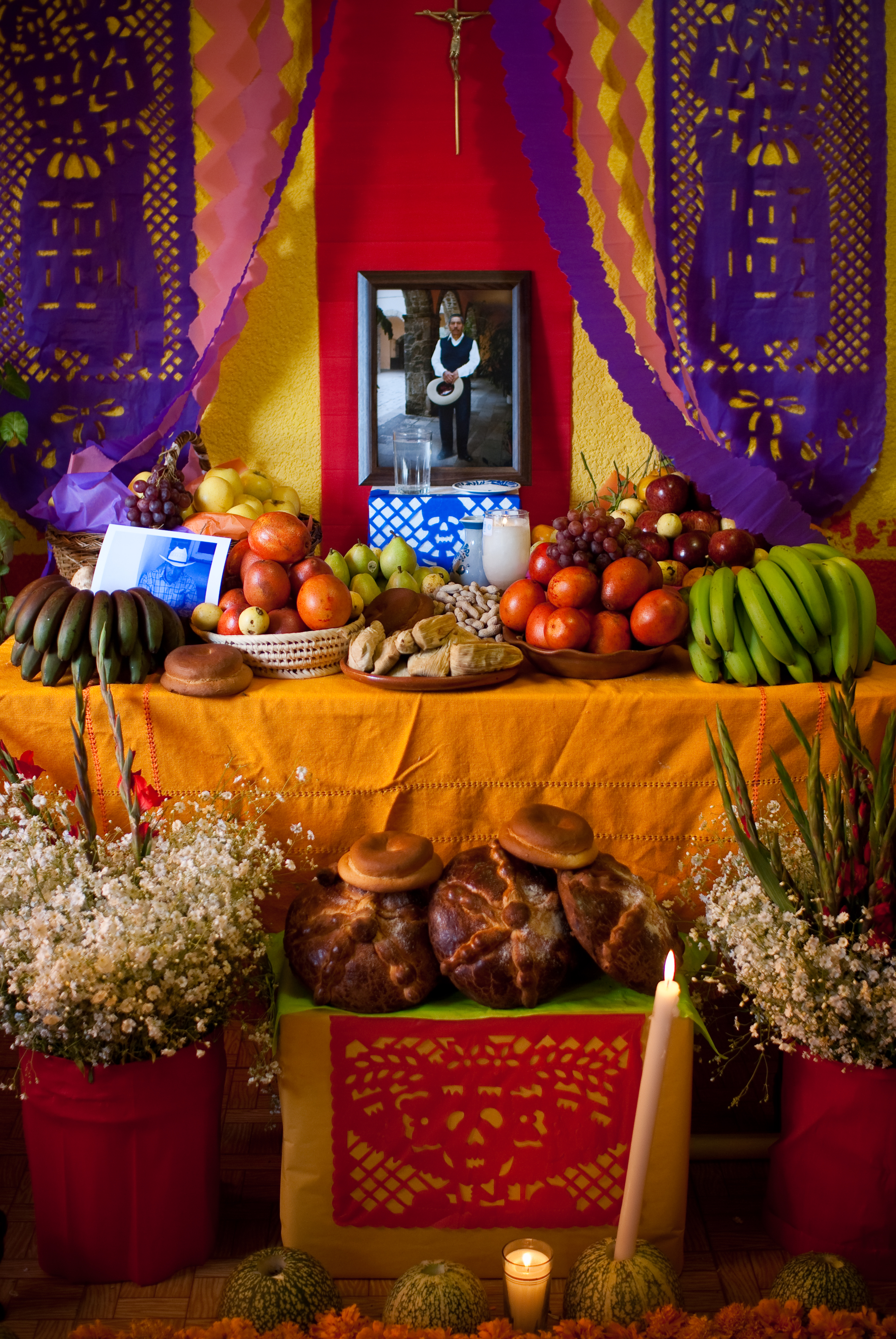
Pan de muerto altar commemorating a deceased man in Milpa Alta, Mexico City

An ofrenda (Spanish: "offering") is the offering placed in a home altar during the annual and traditionally Mexican Día de los Muertos celebration. An ofrenda, which may be quite large and elaborate, is usually created by the family members of the person who has died and is intended to welcome the deceased to the altar setting.

== Background ==
This display coincides with the Día de Muertos, which is a tradition some believe originated with the Aztecs, though others dispute this. The Aztec culture considered souls to continuously live and enter different realms when a body would die. This view the Aztecs held was commingled with the Christian beliefs that the soul is eternal (whether it be in heaven, purgatory, or hell) during the Spanish conquest of the Aztec Empire when the two cultures were merged. The ofrenda is presented in one's home in order to commemorate the souls of loved ones in the family.

== Regional variations ==
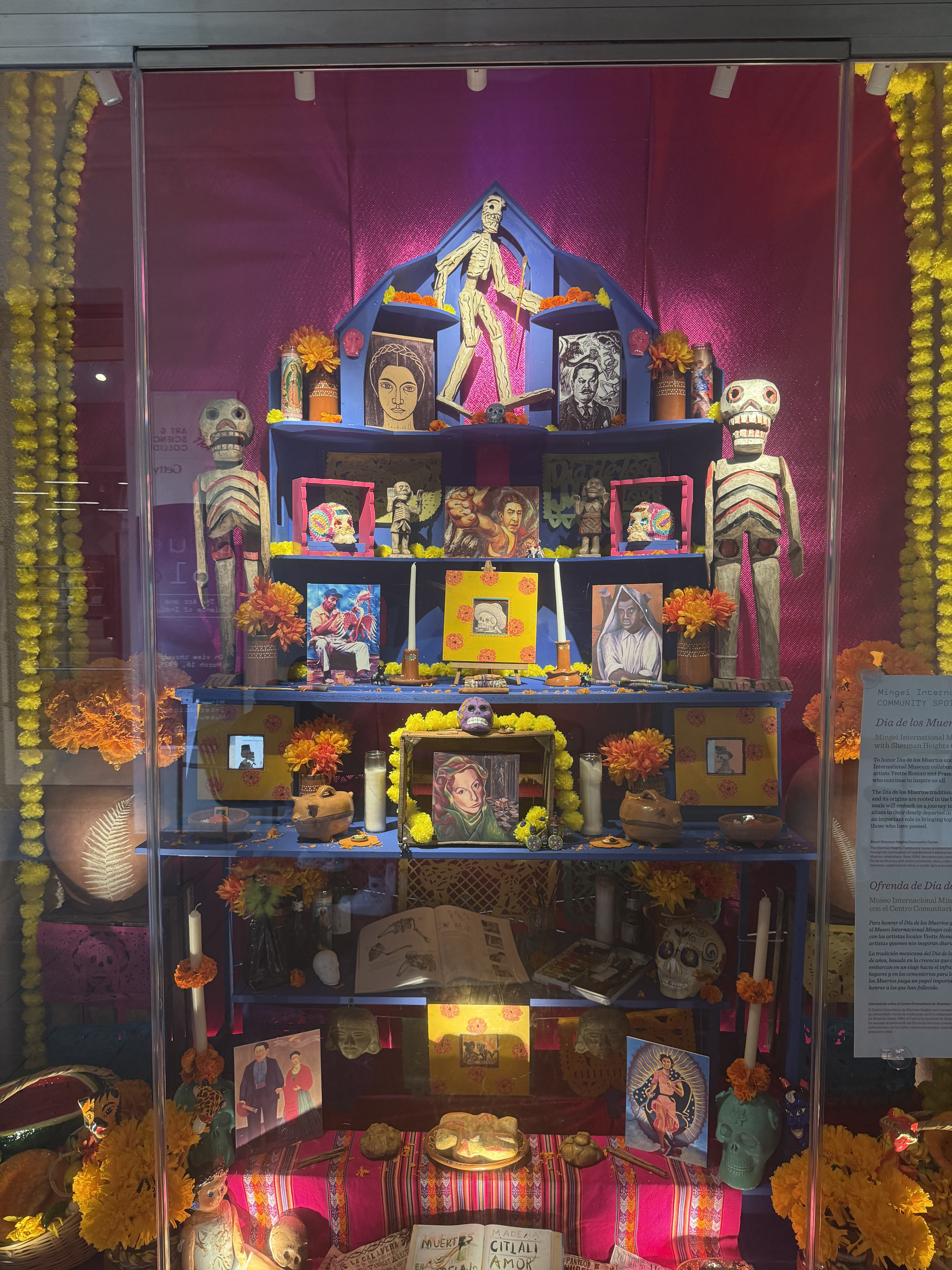
Ofrenda in Balboa Park, 2024

Different regions create their ofrendas in different ways. Some examples of these regional variances are in Oaxaca, Michoacan, Veracruz, Puebla, and Mexico City. In the state of Oaxaca, ofrendas are usually decorated with paper mache decorations called alebrijes. They are usually colourful and help to bring life into the ofrenda. Ofrendas in Michoacan can be adorned with sugar skulls and papel picado. Marigold petals, called cempasuchil, are also used to add colour and fragrance to the ofrenda. In the coastal region of Veracruz, seashells, fish, and seaweed are often added to ofrendas to represent the significance of the sea in the lives of the local communities. Veracruz also has the Guinness World Record for Largest Day of the Dead ofrenda. The culinary heritage of Puebla plays a big role in the decoration of the ofrendas in the region. Traditional foods such as mole poblano, a flavourful sauce, are commonly used in ofrendas. In large cities like Mexico City, ofrendas can be influenced by both modern and traditional items. The urban setting facilitates a dynamic fusion of historical homage and present-day creative expression, showcasing the city's cultural evolution.

== Components of the offering ==
A common format for an ofrenda contains three levels or tiers. The topmost tier identifies the dead person who is being invited to the altar, frequently with photos of the deceased, along with images of various saints, statuettes of the Virgin Mary, crucifixes, etc. which are positioned in a retablo which forms the back of the altar; on the second tier are things placed to encourage the dead to feel at home and welcome: the deceased person's favorite food items might go here, including such things as mole, candy, pan dulce, and especially a sweet bread called pan de muerto. For deceased adults, the ofrenda might include a bottle or poured shot glasses of tequila or mezcal, while if the deceased is a child a favorite toy might be placed here. The bottom-most tier almost always contains lit candles, and might also have a washbasin, mirror, soap, and a towel so that the spirit of the deceased can see and refresh themselves upon arrival at the altar. Throughout the altar are placed calaveras (decorated candied skulls made from compressed sugar) and bright orange and yellow marigolds (cempazuchitl), an Aztec flower of the dead. According to cultural descriptions of the celebration, the smell from the Marigolds helps guide the dead to the ofrenda, and the petals are often picked and spread in a pathway to lead the way. Ofrendas are constructed in the home as well as in village cemeteries and churches.

The ofrenda typically features types of decorations that are representative of the four elements. For example, candles are lit on the table to symbolize the element of fire. Papel picado represents the element air because it is so light weight, you can see how the wind moves it. Since food is solid and is grown in the ground, it represents the element earth. The element of water is represented by the glasses of water. It is thought that because the journey to the land of the living is a long one, water is left out to satisfy the thirst of those who made the journey. Incense from the resin of copal trees are also used in the offering in order to produce smells that will scare away evil spirits.

== In culture ==
A non-fiction children's book called Day of the Dead: A Mexican-American Celebration was written by Diane Hoyt-Goldsmith. The book is about a Mexican-American family celebrating the Day of the Dead (Día de los Muertos) in California and is focused on two young twins in the family. The twins help the family create an ofrenda for their loved ones, as well as a larger ofrenda for their community.

An ofrenda at the Museo del Instituto de Geología de la UNAM themed around fossils and geology

An ofrenda forms a central plot theme in the 2017 animated film Coco.

Another animated film that showcases ofrendas is The Book of Life. The movie incorporates colorful and vibrant ofrendas as part of the visual representation of the Day of the Dead celebration.

The James Bond film Spectre includes a scene set during the Day of the Dead celebration in Mexico City, featuring elaborate ofrendas and traditional costumes.

In Season 15 of Grey's Anatomy, the family of a patient build an ofrenda in her hospital room to mark the Día de los Muertos. The episode contains several other references to the holiday, including many of the doctors meditating on dead loved ones and multiple appearances of marigolds.

On episode 1 of season 3 of the TV series Breaking Bad includes a scene showing Mexican characters crawling towards a shrine of Santa Muerte.

In the 1998 PC adventure game Grim Fandango, which is set in the Land of the Dead during the Day of the Dead, one of the supporting characters is named Olivia Ofrenda. The game is also largely based around Mexican folklore and traditions such as the Día de Muertos, as well as some Aztec mythology.

In Season 2, Episode 18 of Vampirina, featured on Disney Junior, Vampirina learns about Día de los Muertos and how to construct an ofrenda.

Rooms for the Dead, a labyrinth of over 25 altars are featured each year at the Yerba Buena Center in the San Francisco. The display was curated and created in 1972 by artist and activist Rene Yanez.

In the game Cyberpunk 2077, an ofrenda is held as part of an optional mission.
