= Westcott =

Westcott may refer to:

== Places ==
=== United Kingdom ===
- Westcott, Buckinghamshire
  - Rocket Propulsion Establishment
  - RAF Westcott
- Westcott, Devon
- Westcott, Surrey
- Westcott Barton, Oxfordshire
- Westcott House, Cambridge, a theological college affiliated to the University of Cambridge

=== United States ===
- Westcott, Missouri, a ghost town
- Westcott, Syracuse, a neighborhood in Syracuse, New York
- Westcott, Rhode Island, a neighborhood in West Warwick, Rhode Island
- Westcott House (Springfield, Ohio), a Frank Lloyd Wright designed house in Springfield, Ohio
- Westcott Bay, San Juan Islands, Washington

== People ==
- Westcott (surname)

== Others ==
- Westcott factors two factors g and s describing neutron capture. Named after Carl H. Westcott.
- Westcott (automobile) (United States, 1920s)
- J. W. Westcott II, a mailboat operated out of Detroit, Michigan, USA
- Westcott Rule Company, an office supply company that specializes in rulers

== See also ==
- Wescott (disambiguation)
