= Richmond (automobile) =

Defunct American motor vehicle manufacturer

Two Brass era automobiles named Richmond were produced in Richmond, Indiana. A Steam car was made by the Richmond Automobile Company in 1902 and 1903. The Wayne Works produced the Richmond automobile from 1904 to 1917.

== Richmond Automobile Company ==
The Richmond steam car engine was claimed to be simple and the most compact steam vehicle engine on the market. The two-cylinder engine had a 2.5" bore and 3.5" stroke and weighed just 46 pounds. This engine produced its maximum 6 horsepower at 960 rpm. The engine was believed to have been designed by Isham Sedgwick and the steam car was developed by R. L. Sackett. Just the engine was manufactured in 1901, with production of the entire car commencing the following year. The Richmond was a chain-driven dos-a-dos four-seater. By 1903, Richmond Automobile Company ended automobile production, though it is believed that engine production continued past this date.

== Wayne Works - Richmond Automobile ==
Richmond
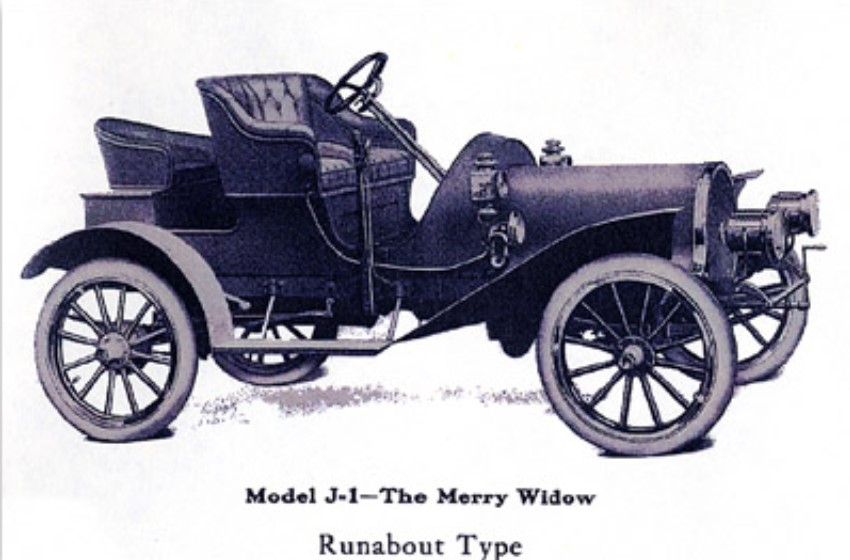
- 1908 Richmond Model J from brochure

Overview
- Type: Touring car, Roadster
- Manufacturer: Wayne Works, Inc.
- Production: 1904–1917
- Designer: Jack St. John

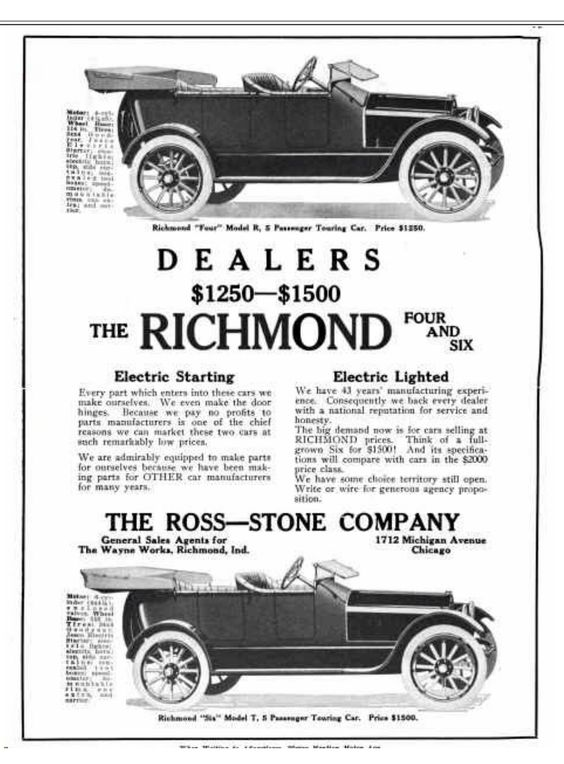
1914 Richmond automobile advertisement

The Wayne Works, Inc. had been making farm implements since the 1870s, and supposedly in 1901 the company president, Walter W. Schultz, asked the chief engineer Jack St. John to design an automobile "because everyone else is." Richmond, Indiana would be home to several car makes including Davis, Pilot and Westcott. St. John designed a two-cylinder air-cooled touring car, which was sold to a local businessman. A subsequent car was sold the next year, but full-scale manufacture did not begin until 1904.

The Richmond entered production with four-cylinder engines with round radiators for most of its production. The Richmond was a mid-priced car of the time, well regarded locally for its reliability and hill-climbing abilities. The biggest change to the Richmond occurred in 1910, when the engine became water-cooled instead of air-cooled. A six-cylinder model was offered from 1914 until 1916, with outputs rising from 45-hp to 50-hp. Horsepower for the earlier air-cooled fours ranged from 20 to 30-hp, while the water-cooled engines produced 22.5 to 40-hp.

In 1915 Herff-Brooks contracted with Wayne Works to provide Richmonds that would be badged as Herff-Brooks. This ended in 1916. In 1917, the automobile department was closed, and the Wayne Works continued production of commercial truck bodies and agricultural tools. An estimated 1,348 Richmonds were built.

Three Richmonds are known to be extant. Two at the Wayne County Historical Museum and one in Spain at the Malaga Motor Museum.

== See also ==
- Richmond Model J at All-Andorra
- Old Cars Weekley article - 1907 Richmond
