= Wescott =

Wescott may refer to:

== Places ==
- Wescott, Minnesota
- Wescott, Nebraska
- Wescott, Wisconsin
- John Wescott Three-Decker, historic triple decker in Worcester, Massachusetts
- Wescott Infant School, infant school in Wokingham, Berkshire, England

== People with the surname ==
- Blake Wescott, American musician
- Glenway Wescott, American novelist
- John W. Wescott, American politician from New Jersey
- Leo Wescott, Australian footballer
- Lloyd Wescott, American agriculturalist
- Samuel Wescott, American politician from New Jersey
- Seth Wescott, American snowboarder
- Teackle T. Wescott, American politician and soldier from Virginia

== See also ==
- Westcott (disambiguation)
