= Richmond Square =

Richmond Square may refer to:

- Richmond Centre (mall), formerly Richmond Square, in Richmond, British Columbia, Canada
- Richmond Mall, formerly Richmond Square, in Richmond, Indiana, US
