= Westcott (surname) =

Westcott is an English surname. Notable people with the name include:

- Anarcha Westcott (c. 1828 – unknown), enslaved woman experimented on by physician J. Marion Sims
- Brooke Foss Westcott (1825–1901), British bishop, biblical scholar and theologian
- Burton J. Westcott (1868–1926), American businessman based in Ohio
- Carl Westcott (born 1939), American businessman
- Carlia S. Westcott, American marine engineer
- Carrie Westcott (born 1969), American model and actress
- David Westcott (born 1957), British hockey player and cricketer
- David M. Westcott (ca 1769–1841), New York politician
- Dick Westcott (1927–2013), South African cricketer
- Duvie Westcott (born 1977), Canadian ice hockey player
- Frederic Westcott (died 1861), English botanist
- Frederick John Westcott, known as Fred Karno (1866–1941), British theatre impresario
- Genevieve Westcott (1955–2020), Canadian-born New Zealand journalist and television presenter
- Gordon Westcott (1903–1935), American actor
- Helen Westcott (1928–1998), American actress
- Lisa Westcott, Award-winning British makeup artist
- Payton Westcott (born 2009), American racing driver
- Stukely Westcott (1592–1677), Founding settler of Rhode Island
- William Westcott (aviator), USAF flying ace during the Korean War
- William Wynn Westcott (1848–1925), co-founder of the Hermetic Order of the Golden Dawn
- The Westcott family of Florida:
  - James Westcott (1802–1880), U.S. senator from Florida
  - James Westcott III (1839–1887), justice of the Supreme Court of Florida
  - John S. Westcott (1807–1888), surveyor general of Florida, state representative, and Confedeate officer
