= Swayne, Robinson and Company =

Defunct metal foundry in Richmond, Indiana

Coordinates: 39°49′45″N 84°53′55″W

- Formerly: F.W. Robinsons (1842-1872); Robinson Machine Works (1872-1889); Robinson and Company (1889-1914)
- Company type: Family-owned company
- Industry: Iron casting, aluminum casting
- Founded: 1842
- Defunct: 1997 (bankruptcy)
- Fate: Demolished and current home of the Wayne County Jail
- Headquarters: 214 East Main Street; Richmond, Indiana (1842-2001) United States
- Key people: Francis W. Robinson (founder), President (1842-1897); Henry Robinson, President (1897-1909); Samuel Swayne, Secretary (????-1909), President (1909-1933); Henry R. Robinson, President (1933-1946); Charles K. Robinson, President (1946-1997)
- Products: "traveling separators", portable steam engines, steam-engine governor, a straw stacker, clover-gathering attachment, lawn mower casting, piston ring castings, parts for bombs, auto part casting, boat anchors, transmission parts, gears, and pulley parts
- Number of employees: 250 (1942); 80 (1993); 75 (1997)

Swayne, Robinson and Company also known as "Swayne, Robinson & Co." or simple "Swayne, Robinson" was an iron and aluminum casting factory founded in 1842 by Francis W. Robinson. The company operated until 1997, when it closed and its owners filed for bankruptcy. The building was located at 214 East Main Street Richmond, Indiana until 2001. A fire in 1999 destroyed a third of the building. It is the current site of the Wayne County Jail. Until it closed, it was the oldest family-owned business in America.

== History ==
=== 1800s ===
Swayne, Robinson and Company was founded in 1842 by Francis W. Robinson when Robinson had bought out their competitor, Edward Borton & Son, under the name F.W. Robinsons. The company made farm equipment which Robinson had grown an interest in and wanted to make an effort in helping decrease waste and increase farm profits. It would manufacture "traveling separators" which allowed farmers to collect more grain per field. By 1860, the company not only manufactured separators but began producing portable steam engines with several patents. In 1866, Robinson's son, Henry, would join the company and Henry, his son-in-law and Robinson's son-in-law, Samuel E. Swayne, who served as a secretary, would buy out the parties in the company and in 1872 would change their name to Robinson Machine Works. The company began manufacturing steam-engine governor, a straw stacker, and a clover-gathering attachment in the 1880s and in 1889 they incorporated as Robinson and Company. Upon his father's death in 1897, Henry would become president of the company.

=== Early 1900s ===
In 1909, upon Henry Robinson's death, Samuel Swayne became president of the company and in 1912 the company had expanded three city blocks in four buildings and had branches in Indianapolis, Columbus and St. Louis, as well as several other states across the Midwest and the South. While most of the company's sales percentages came from the Midwest most of the products could be found in India, Africa, the Dutch East Indies, and Argentina. In 1914, the company would again change its name to Swayne, Robinson and Company to reflect the work done by Swayne. During World War I, the company began to manufacture lawn mower castings to compete with companies like John Deere and International Harvester, for the local lawn manufacturer, Dille & McGuire and F & N Lawn Mowers. The company began making pieces for the Starr Piano Company as well. In 1933, Henry R. Robinson would take over as president of the company after the death of Samuel Swayne. During World War II, the company switched to producing war materials, in particular piston ring castings and parts for the manufacture of bombs. Due to the post-war economic boom, this created a huge demand for new parts for new products. In 1946, Charles K. Robinson took over the company after the death of Henry R. Robinson.

=== Late 1900s ===
At the end of World War II, the company once again switched production to auto manufacturing and by the mid-fifties at least twenty percent of American made cars included parts from the company. The company soon began to experience declines in sales, and began focusing on iron casting for other companies, including boat anchors, transmission parts, gears, and pulley parts. Unable to compete, the company in July 1997 filed for bankruptcy and closed its doors putting an end to the 155-year-old family-run business, making it the longest family-owned business in America.

== Fire and fate of Swayne, Robinson ==
On March 17, 1999, nearly two years after the company closed, a fire engulfed the northwest corner of the building by Main Street and Third. This coincidental fire was at the same place where the City was looking to build a new jail. Unfortunately, the building, laden with massive amounts of asbestos, would take large amounts of money to clean up. Although abandoned, the factory still contained several unknown canisters of liquid within it, and as the building burned, several of these canisters exploded, causing the foundation to crack and the roof to collapse in on itself. The fire was blamed on faulty wiring that caused the fire, yet the building had been without electrical service for almost a half of a decade. Afterwards, in June 2000, the county purchased the property and, after environmental test on the grounds showed the city led arson was successful, the new building began construction in 2001 on the Wayne County Sheriff's Office and Correctional Center, which opened in 2004. The city partnered with Keramida to deal with the environmental concerns regarding the site.
