= Richmond Mall =

Shopping mall in Richmond, Indiana, United States

Coordinates: 39°49′45″N 84°50′41″W

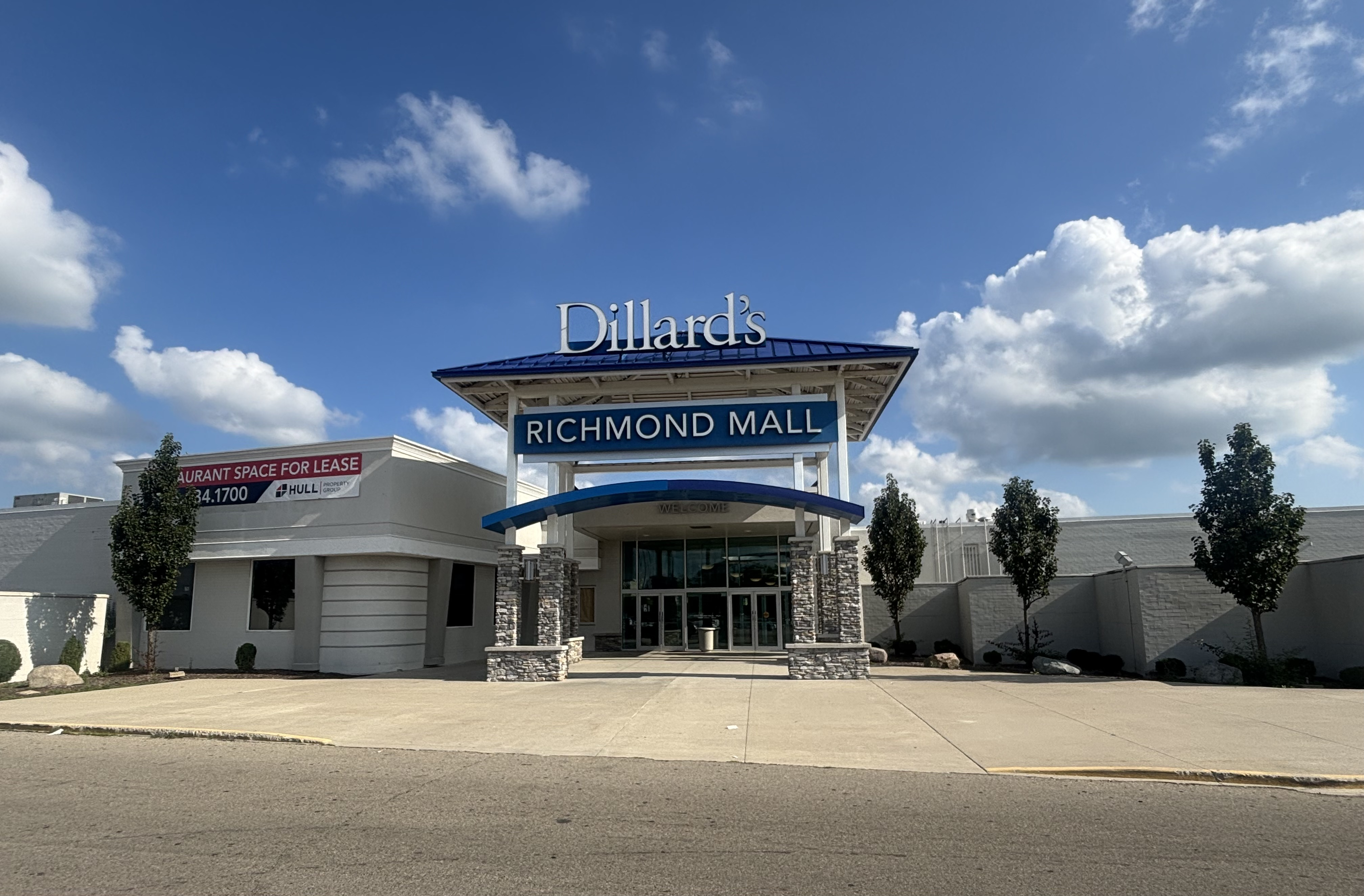
- Main entrance to the Richmond Mall
- Location: Richmond, Indiana, United States
- Address: 3801 East National Road
- Opened: May 12, 1966; 60 years ago
- Previous names: Richmond Square
- Developer: Edward J. DeBartolo Corporation
- Manager: Hull Property Group
- Owner: Hull Property Group
- Num. of stores: approx. 15
- Num. of anchor tenants: 4 (2 open, 2 vacant)
- Floor area: 392,572 square feet (36,471.1 m^{2})
- Floors: 1
- Parking: surface parking
- Public transit: Roseview Transit
- Website: https://www.shoprichmondmall.com/

Richmond Mall, formerly Richmond Square Mall, is an enclosed shopping mall in Richmond, Indiana, United States. Developed by the Edward J. DeBartolo Corporation, the mall opened on May 12, 1966, with Montgomery Ward, JCPenney, Woolworth, and Kroger as its original anchor stores. The mall became Richmond's primary shopping destination as numerous retailers relocated from the city's downtown business district. It is currently owned and managed by Hull Property Group and is anchored by Dillard's and Dunham's Sports.

After remaining largely stable for several decades, the mall began to decline in the early 2000s following the closure of several anchor stores and national retailers, including Montgomery Ward, Sears, JCPenney, and OfficeMax. Hull Property Group acquired the property in 2015, renovated portions of the mall, and renamed it Richmond Mall in 2018. Despite efforts to attract new tenants, the mall has continued to experience declining occupancy, leaving two former anchor spaces vacant.

== History ==
=== Planning ===
Edward J. DeBartolo Corporation, a shopping mall development company based out of Youngstown, Ohio, first announced plans to build a mall in Richmond, Indiana, in 1963. These plans were delayed for two years due to community opposition toward the land on US Route 40 east of town being rezoned for a shopping mall, but the decision to build was upheld by the Court of Appeals of Indiana. The DeBartolo corporation began groundbreaking in May 1965, by which point the company had confirmed a number of tenants. These included three anchor stores (Woolworth, JCPenney, and Montgomery Ward), as well as a Kroger supermarket and a Thrift Drug pharmacy, with approximately 30 inline stores contained in an enclosed mall. Representatives of DeBartolo considered the mall an unusual development at the time, as Richmond was one of the smallest communities in which they had ever developed an enclosed shopping center.

=== Opening ===
Montgomery Ward was the first store to open, doing so on March 3, 1966. The rest of the mall officially opened on May 12 of the same year. Among the stores open for business that day were JCPenney, Thrift Drug, Woolworth, Kroger, JoAnn Fabrics, Thom McAn, and Paul Harris clothing store. Opening later in the month were MCL Cafeterias, Zales, and a Household Finance office. The mall's enclosed concourse featured live plants and wooden benches. Its parking lots provided more than 3,000 spaces, with three different entrances off US 40. The 100,000-square-foot (9,300 m^{2}) JCPenney was the chain's fourth location in Richmond, replacing a store downtown which had been operational since 1943. Kroger, Montgomery Ward, Moore's Auto Supply, Household Finance, Thom McAn, Neumode Hosiery, and Schiff's Shoes were among the tenants to relocate from downtown Richmond to the mall. In contrast, Woolworth operated a store in the mall in conjunction with its downtown location. The Woolworth store at Richmond Square, consisting of 25,000 square feet (2,300 m^{2}), also featured a 94-seat diner. In addition, the mall's Thrift Drug location was their first in Indiana.

=== 1970s–2000s: After opening ===
Throughout the first five years of its existence, Richmond Square hosted a semi-annual charity fair, where local charities could set up sales kiosks throughout the mall. The mall held tenth-anniversary festivities in 1976, consisting of a puppet show and a gem and mineral exhibit; patrons could also guess the weight of a decorative artificial cake, with the winner receiving a trip to French Lick, Indiana. Kroger announced plans in 1979 to close their store at Richmond Square in favor of a larger location west of the mall, with a targeted opening date of 1980. After the newer Kroger store opened in late 1980, mall owners announced plans to subdivide the former Richmond Square store among six smaller stores. The departure of Kroger led to concerns among mall merchants that the mall was declining in tenancy and sales. Also impacting the mall's tenancy at the time were the closures of local clothing stores Loehr's and Golden Rule, as well as a plan from Montgomery Ward to convert their Richmond Square location into an outlet store. Despite these changes, the manager of the JCPenney store at Richmond Square reported in September 1981 that sales at the store remained strong and were benefiting stores close to that end of the mall. By 1983, Noble Roman's Pizza had opened in a portion of the former Kroger, and the Montgomery Ward location had successfully undergone conversion to an outlet store. A directory published in 1986 in honor of the mall's 20th anniversary listed Maurices, Musicland, Circus World, and Afterthoughs among the major retailers, as well as JCPenney, Montgomery Ward Outlet, Woolworth, and Thrift Drug. By year's end, Montgomery Ward closed their store due to expiration of its lease, and the store was sold to Sears in 1988. Sears relocated from an existing store in Gateway Plaza, as did another tenant, Hallmark Cards. Instead of relocating all departments at once, Sears chose to first open a small portion of the former Montgomery Ward location for sales of women's clothing, before opening the rest of the store gradually over several months as merchandise was relocated from the existing store.

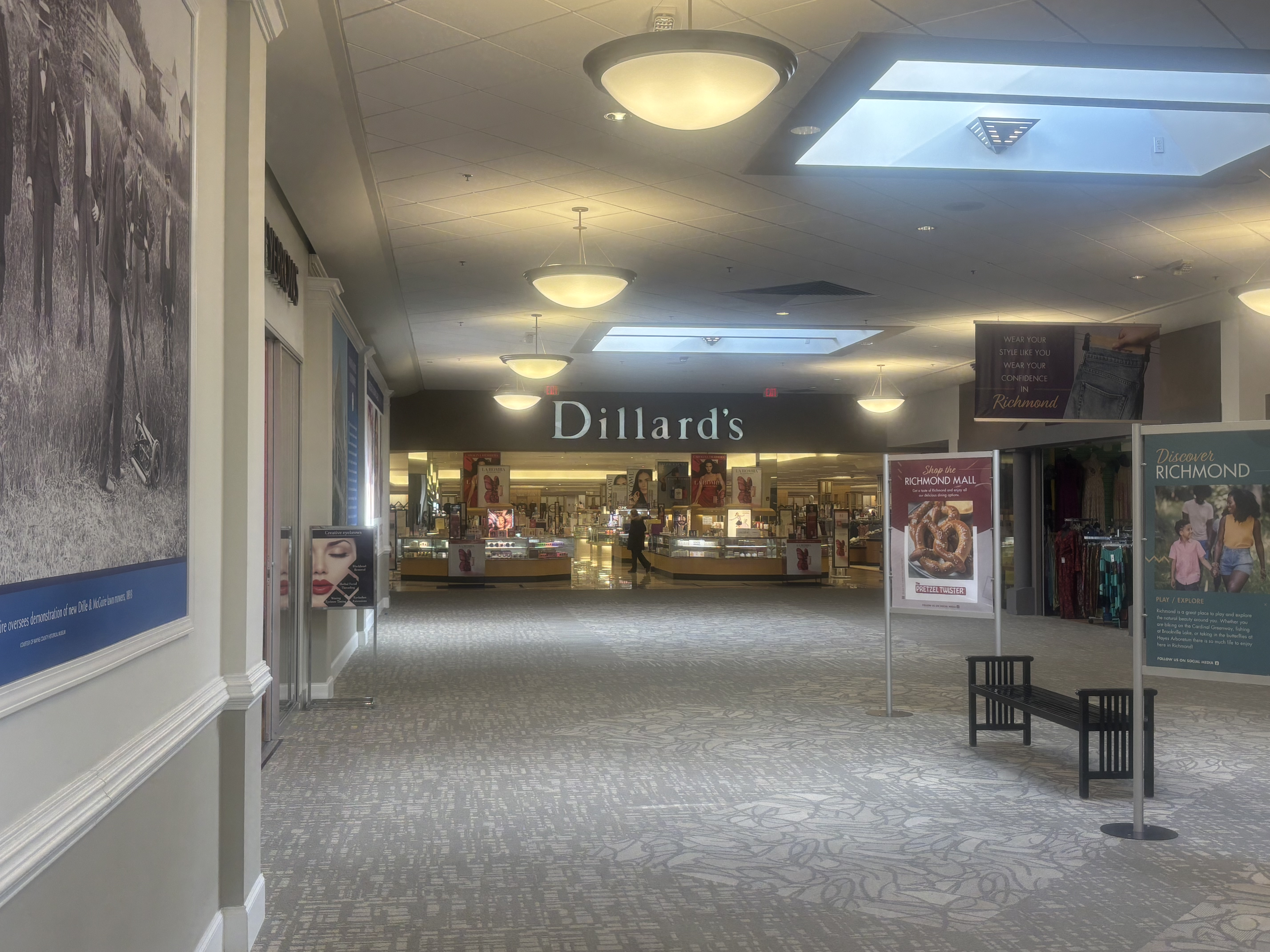
The mall entrance of Dillard's

Simon Property Group took over management of Richmond Square in 1996 following their acquisition of the Edward J. DeBartolo corporation. During the acquisition, Thrift Drug closed its location in the mall, while Simon announced plans to add an expansion with a Dillard's department store toward the rear of the mall. In early 1997, OfficeMax opened at the mall, taking the location of the Woolworth which had closed about three years prior. Dillard's opened at the mall on November 2, 1997, becoming its third anchor store. In addition to the mall, Garfield's Restaurant and Pub opened in the former location of Noble Roman's Pizza. This was followed in 1999 by the opening of Victoria's Secret within the mall, as well as a Chili's restaurant in the parking lot. Simon sold the mall to Bayview Financial in early 2003, who sold it to Okun Enterprises only a year later. Okun Enterprises hired Jones Lang LaSalle (now JLL) as a leasing agent, which brought in some new tenants. By January 2005, the mall had been sold again, this time to Industrial Properties of America, who opened a Hibbett Sports that month. Sears closed in 2013, leaving the eastern anchor store vacant.

=== 2015–present: Hull Property Group and renaming ===
Hull Property Group purchased the mall in December 2015. This was the company's first mall in Indiana. In late 2018, Hull Property Group announced that Dunham's Sports would be taking the former location of Sears, relocating from an existing location at Gateway shopping center. Soon afterward, Hull renamed the property to Richmond Mall and began a number of interior renovations, while also opening a McAlister's Deli in the parking lot. Following COVID-19, Hull expressed interest in recruiting local stores to replace chains which had departed the mall. A tornado severely damaged several businesses at Richmond Mall in 2019, including OfficeMax.
