= Pilot Motor Car Company =

American automobile manufacturer (1909–1924)

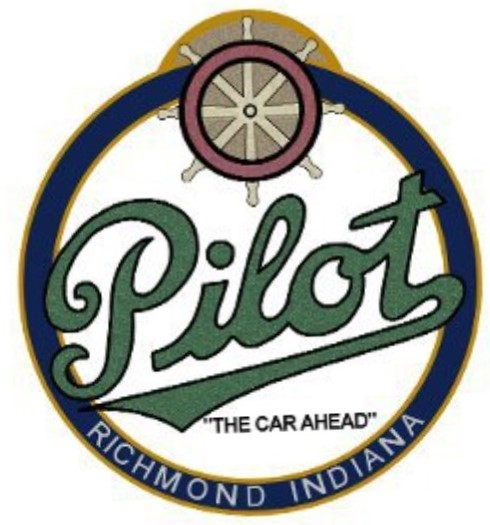
- The Car Ahead
- Formerly: Seidel Buggy Company
- Type: Incorporation (business)
- Industry: Automotive
- Founded: 1909; 117 years ago
- Founder: George Seidel
- Defunct: 1924; 102 years ago
- Fate: Bankruptcy
- Headquarters: Richmond, Indiana, United States
- Products: Automobiles
- Production output: 5,282 (1910-1924)

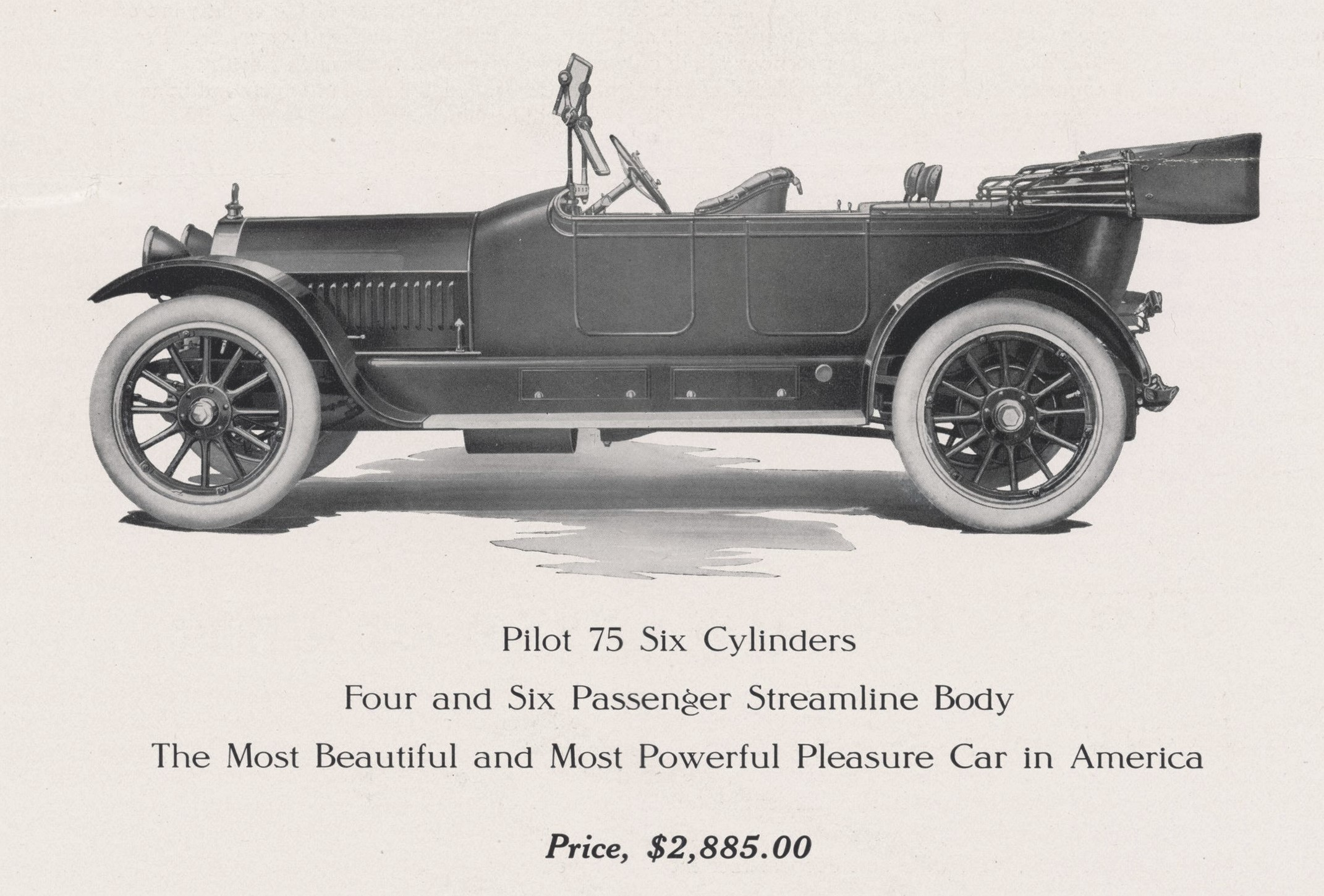
1914 Pilot Model 75 from Pilot Motor Car Company brochure

The Pilot Motor Car Company of Richmond, Indiana, was an American automobile manufacturer founded in 1909 and headed by George Seidel, of the Seidel Buggy Company.

== History ==
Initially, the cars were built in the Seidel Buggy factory while a stand-alone factory was constructed across town. The origin of the makes name is believed to have come from Seidel's desire to become a river boat pilot. They were marketed under the advertising slogan "The Car Ahead". The new factory, once completed, had an initial capacity of 500 cars per year, though in some later years, production approached 1,000. The firm was one of the first in the automotive field to hire women, though mainly for upholstery and curtain work.

== Models ==
At first, 4-cylinder Teetor-Hartley engines were the motive force of the cars. In 1913, a 6-cylinder engine was added to the line-up. From 1915 to 1924, only six-cylinders were offered, except for 1916, when a V8 engine made a one-year appearance as an engine choice. In 1913, the six-cylinder car cost $2,500, as opposed to the mid-priced $1,500 to $1,800 (equivalent to $58,636 in 2025) four-cylinder cars. In 1920, a larger Herschell-Spillman six was added. A Sportster model was introduced in the summer of 1922, with barrel headlights and no running boards.

Pilots were durable cars, and were regularly exported. Seidel received a letter in the 1940s from a car dealer in South America, who inquired if any Pilots were still available, and their price. Seidel was proud supporter of his hometown industries, as evidenced by the cars he drove during his lifetime: first, a Richmond; then a Pilot, and finally, a Davis.

== Lorraine and Pilots demise ==
The firm took over the local Lorraine automobile manufacturer, but that could not help it survive long beyond the 1920-21 depression. A few Lorraine hearses were produced before that marque was discontinued. The Pilot Motor Car Company was forced into receivership in 1923 by what Seidel described as "cut-throat tactics of Eastern money interests." The last Pilots were produced in early 1924, and the factory was then sold to a local businessman for $28,500.

== Advertisements ==
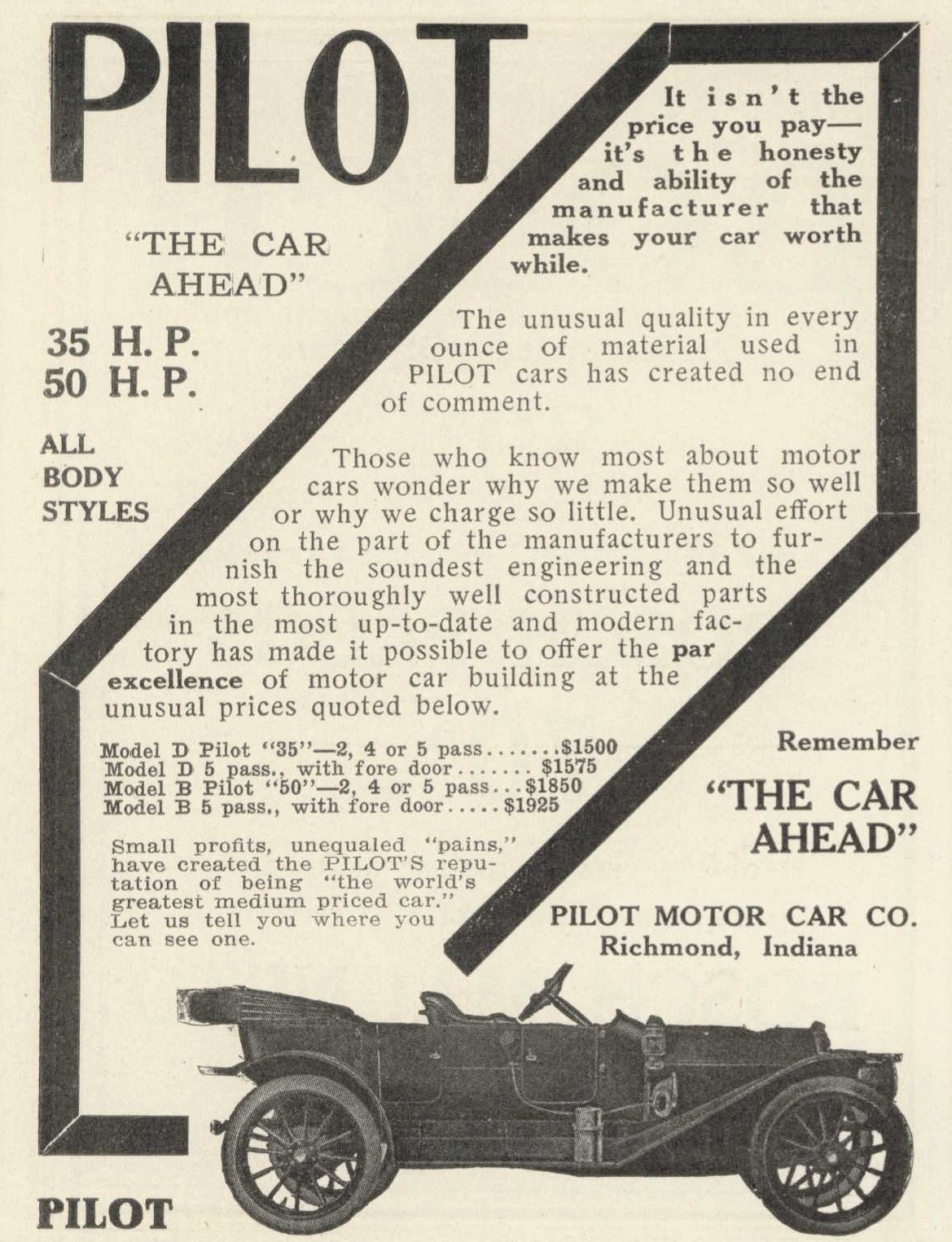
1911 Pilot 35-hp and 50-hp advertisement - Motor Age

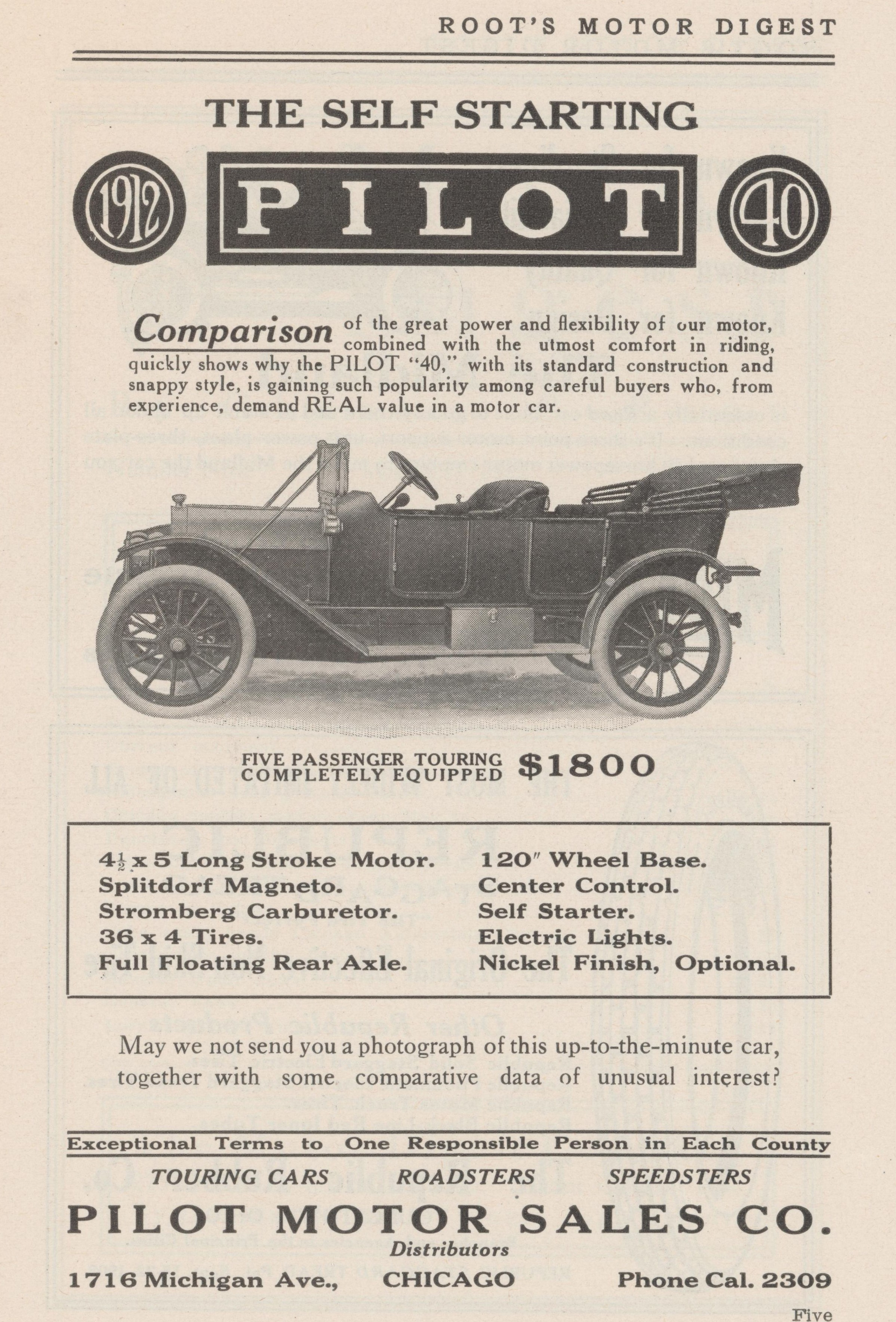
1912 Pilot Model 40 advertisement - Roots Motor Digest

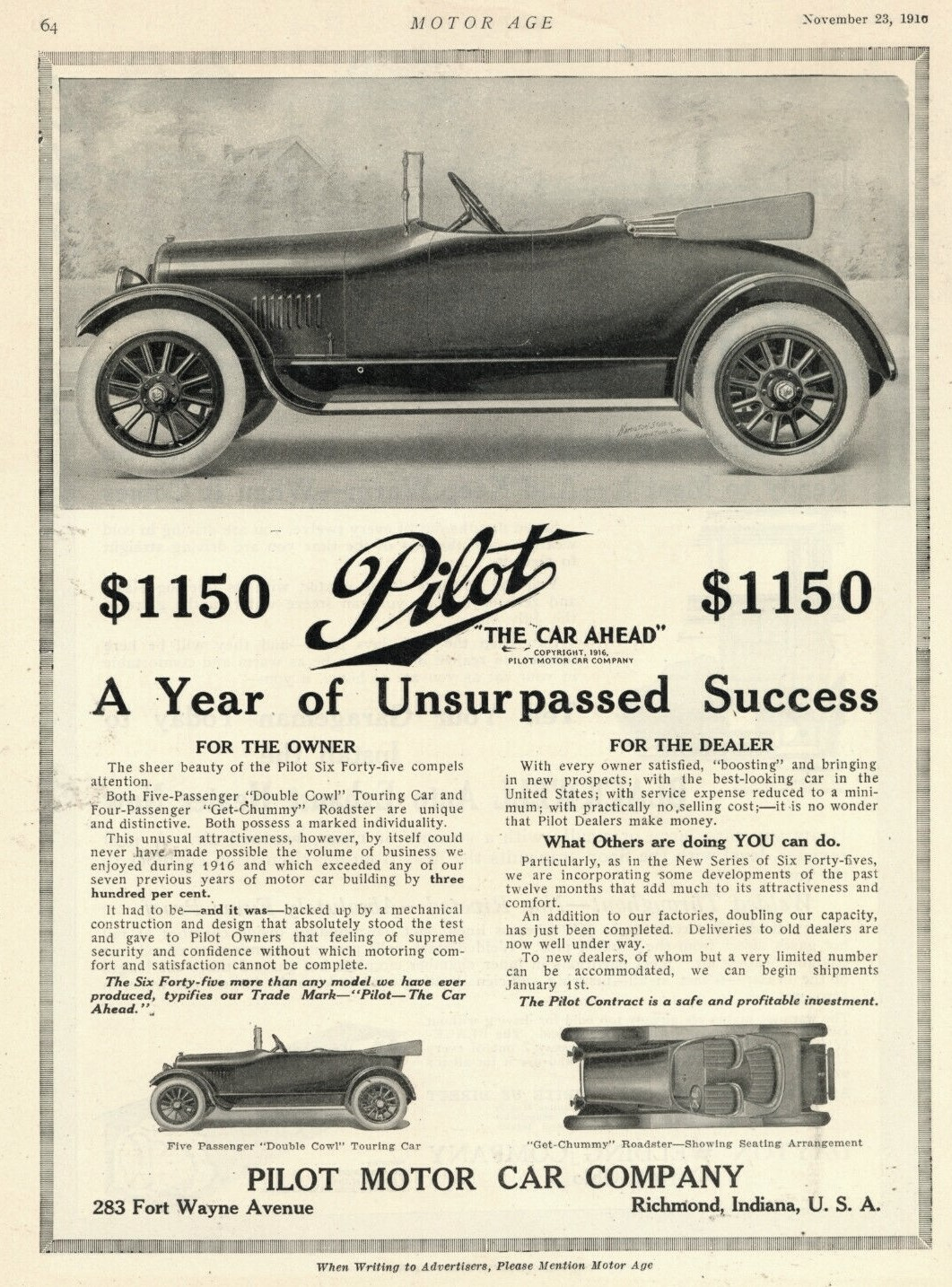
1916 Pilot 6-45 Double Cowl Roadster - Motor Age

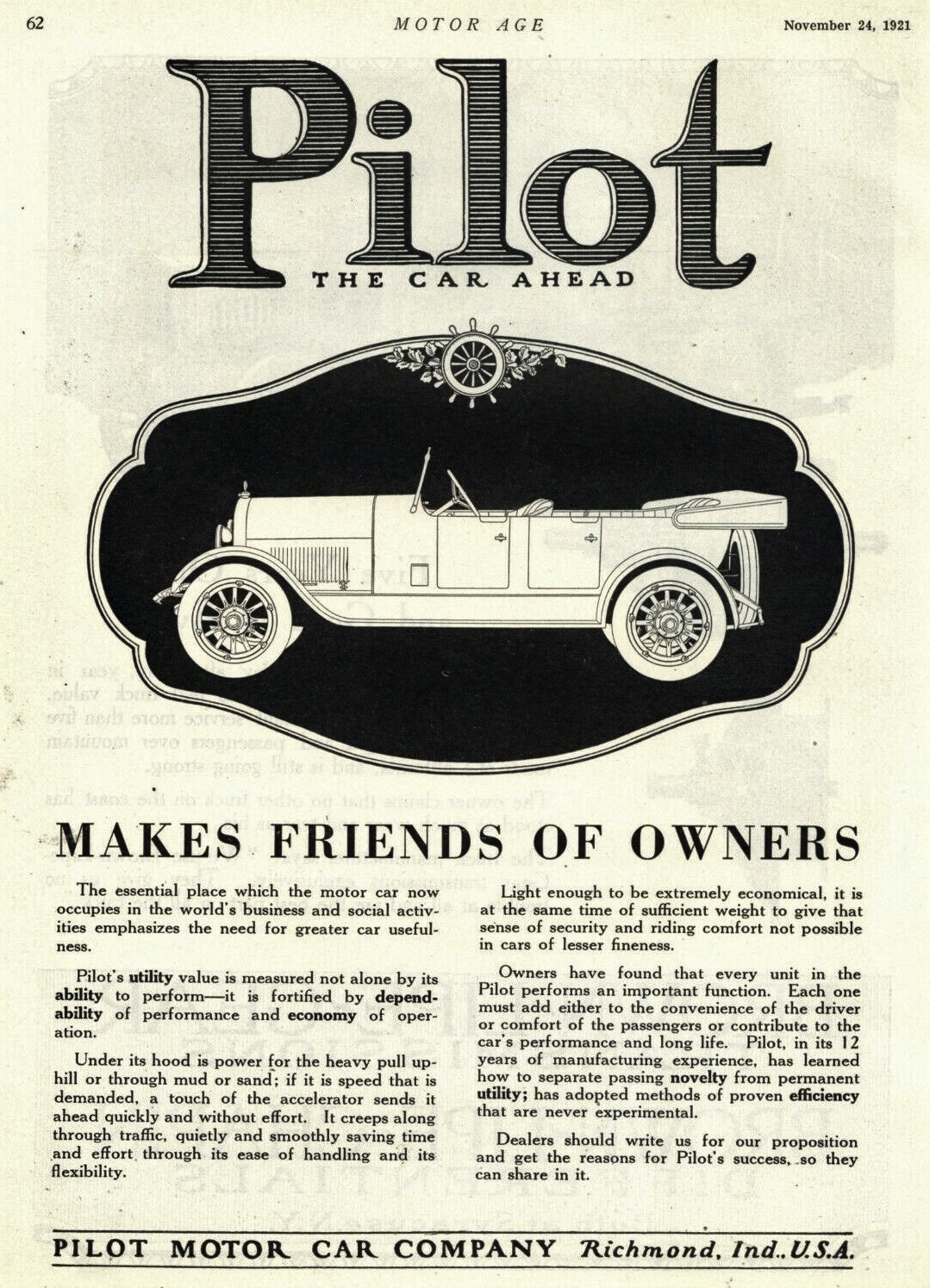
1921 Pilot Touring Car advertisement - Motor Age

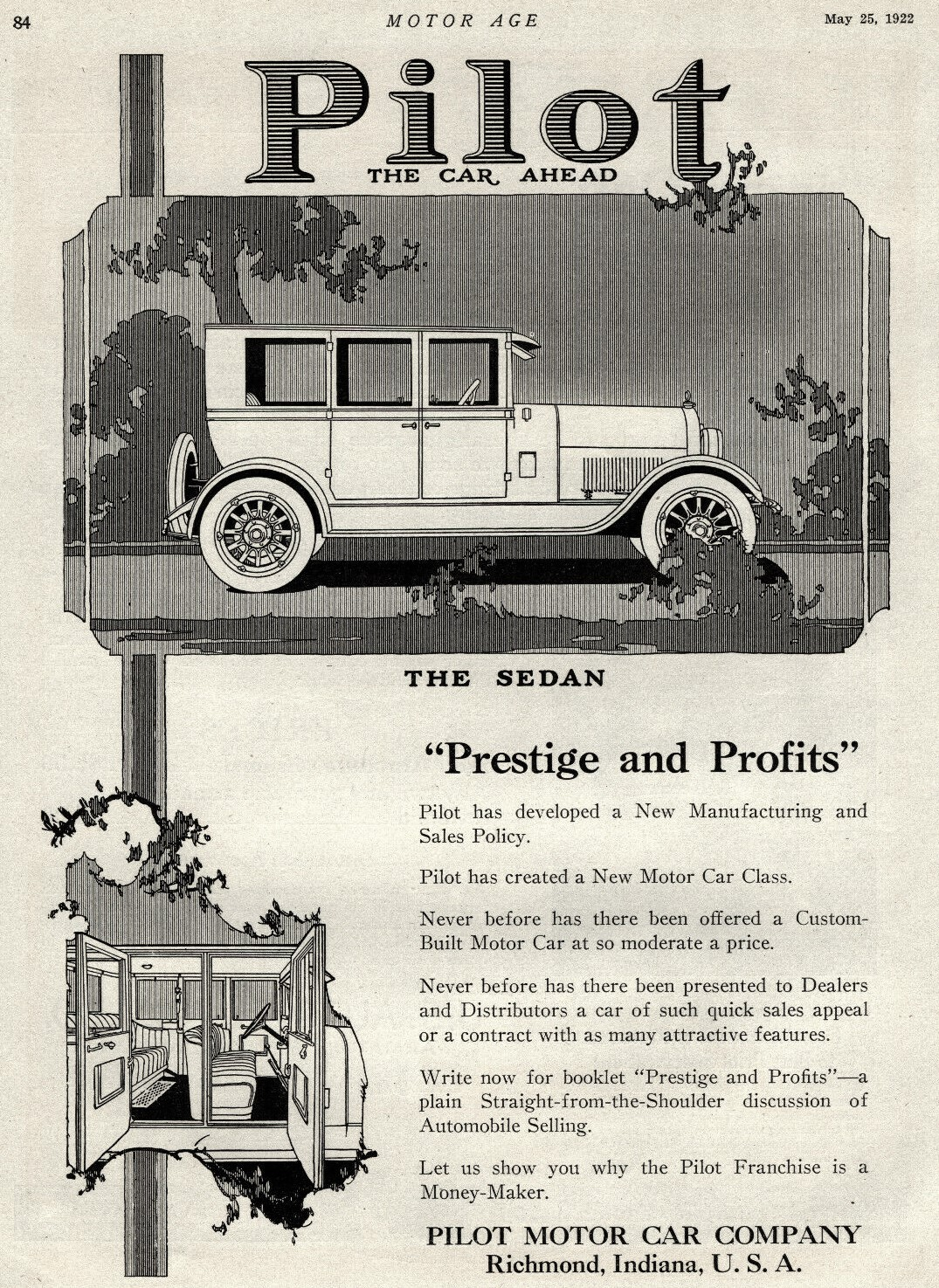
1922 Pilot Sedan advertisement - Motor Age
