= Boston Township, Wayne County, Indiana =

Boston Township
- Township
- Location in Wayne County
- Coordinates: 39°45′30″N 84°52′22″W
- Country: United States
- State: Indiana
- County: Wayne

Government
  - Type: Indiana township

Area
  - Total: 24.79 sq mi (64.2 km^{2})
  - Land: 24.67 sq mi (63.9 km^{2})
  - Water: 0.12 sq mi (0.31 km^{2}) 0.48%
- Elevation: 1,089 ft (332 m)

Population (2020)
  - Total: 941
  - Density: 36/sq mi (14/km^{2})
- Time zone: UTC-5 (Eastern (EST))
  - Summer (DST): UTC-4 (EDT)
- Area code: 765
- GNIS feature ID: 453131

Boston Township is one of fifteen townships in Wayne County, Indiana, United States. As of the 2010 census, its population was 887 and it contained 404 housing units.

== History ==
Boston Township was formed in 1835.

== Geography ==
According to the 2010 census, the township has a total area of 24.79 square miles (64.2 km^{2}), of which 24.67 square miles (63.9 km^{2}) (or 99.52%) is land and 0.12 square miles (0.31 km^{2}) (or 0.48%) is water. The streams of Boston Creek, Cream Run, Lick Creek and Tea Creek run through this township.

=== Cities and towns ===
- Richmond (Municipal Airport)
- Boston

=== Unincorporated towns ===
(This list is based on USGS data and may include former settlements.)

=== Cemeteries ===
The township contains at least two cemeteries, Glen Haven Memorial Gardens and Elkhorn Cemetery. There are also a couple of small burial grounds in the southern part of the township.

=== Major highways ===
- U.S. Route 27
- Indiana State Road 227

=== Airports and landing strips ===
- Richmond Municipal Airport
