= Westcott House (Springfield, Ohio) =

Historic house in Ohio, United States

- U.S. National Register of Historic Places
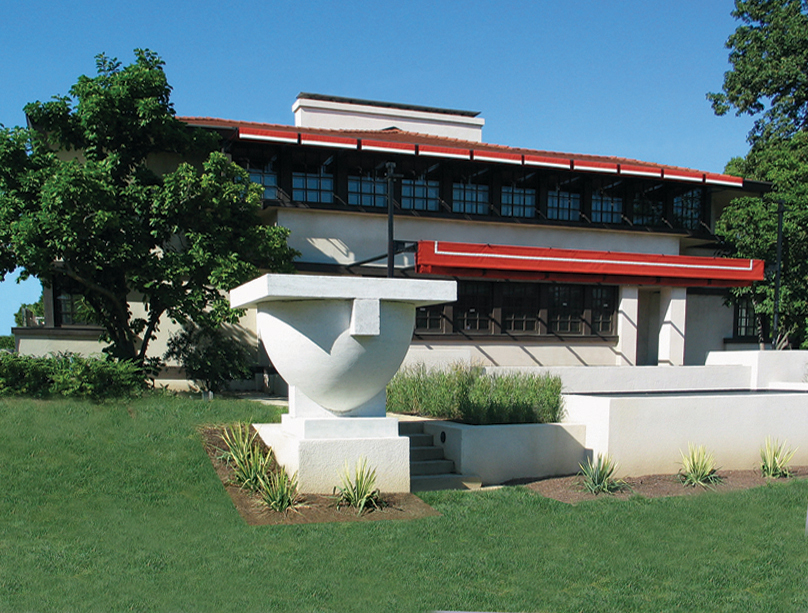
- Westcott House

- Location within Ohio Location within the United States
- Location: 1340 E. High St., Springfield, Ohio
- Coordinates: 39°55′17.38″N 83°47′20.94″W
- Built: 1908
- Architect: Wright, Frank Lloyd
- Architectural style: Prairie School
- NRHP reference No.: 74001413
- Added to NRHP: July 24, 1974

The Westcott House is a Prairie Style house designed by Frank Lloyd Wright in Springfield, Ohio. The house was built in 1908 for Mr. Burton J. Westcott, his wife Orpha, and their family. The Westcott property is the only Prairie style house designed by Wright in the state of Ohio. The grounds include the main house and a garage with stables connected by an extensive pergola.

== History ==
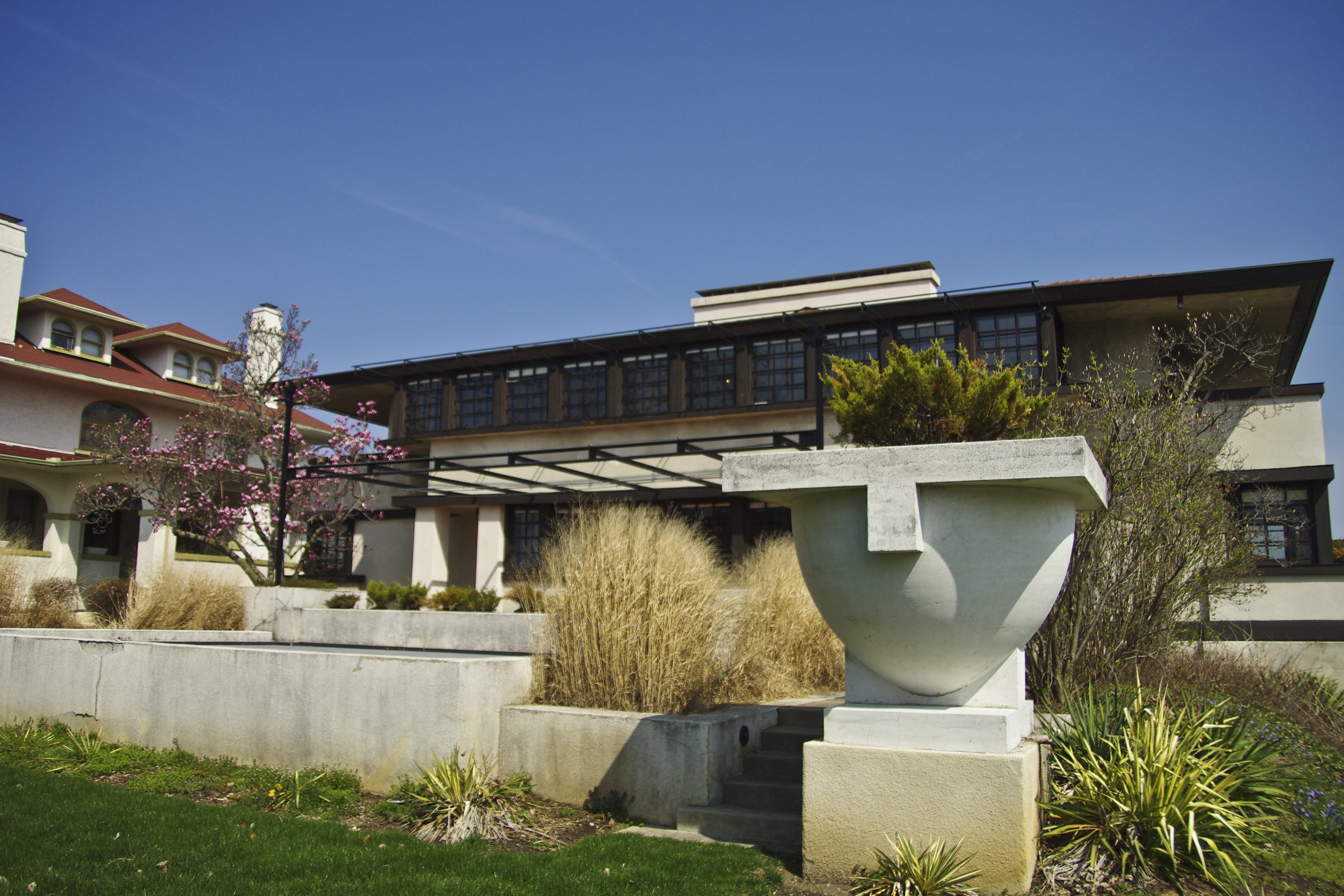
The Westcott House by Frank Lloyd Wright (2014)

In 1903, as part of a merger, Burton J. Westcott came to Springfield, Ohio, as Treasurer of The American Seeding Machine Company. He would hold the position for 21 years.

In 1916, Burton brought the Westcott Motor Car Company to Springfield, Ohio, from Richmond, Indiana. He was president of the company until 1925. Wright designed a detached garage which included a design for a large turntable (never installed), similar to at a railroad yard. The garage also included two pony stables and was connected to the main house by a pergola.

Burton's wife, Orpha, was from Hamilton, Ohio. The Westcotts had two children: Jeanne born in Richmond, Indiana, in 1895, and John born in Springfield, Ohio, in 1903. Orpha L. Westcott was considered one of Springfield's most prominent and progressive women, and is credited with suggesting Frank Lloyd Wright as the architect for their new home.

In 1918, the Westcotts built the only addition to their home, a summer porch on the second floor and a room below in keeping with the original design of the Prairie style architecture of Frank Lloyd Wright. By 1920, Jennie was no longer living in the Westcott House; she married Richard Rodgers from Springfield, Ohio. Their wedding was held at the house. The only other residents of the house were a cook named Nora and a housemaid named Margaret, both middle-aged and originally from Ireland.

The 1920s proved to be unhappy years for the Westcott family. Orpha died suddenly in April 1923 following a minor surgical procedure in Philadelphia. At the same time, Burton's company was failing. He resigned as treasurer of the American Seeding Machine Company in order to invest more time for the failing Westcott Motor Car Company. Attempts to save the ailing car company had exhausted his finances. With no other option Burton sold out. The severe stress in his life took its toll on his health. He died in 1926 in his home on East High Street, aged 57, while under the care of his sister from Richmond, Indiana. Funeral services were held at the Westcott residence; he was buried in Richmond.

Following the death of Burton in 1926, the Westcott House was sold to Roscoe Pierce. He lived in the house until his death in 1941. Eva Linton bought the house in 1944. She subsequently subdivided the main house into five apartments. Linton also had the stables remodeled, adding a kitchen and bathroom, and converted the garage into her place of residence. Over the next 37 years the house fell into a state of disrepair and decline. Eva Linton died in 1980, and her estate was passed to her niece Dorothy Jane Snyder. Dorothy inherited the property in 1981 and maintained it until 1988 when she sold it to her son Ken Snyder and his wife Sherri.

=== Westcott House Foundation ===
In 1991, Ken died unexpectedly in a car accident. Sherri struggled to manage and maintain the house until she sold the house in 2000. The Frank Lloyd Wright Building Conservancy acquired the decaying Westcott House from Mrs. Snyder for $300,000 through the use of their Lewis-Haines revolving loan program, and as part of the predefined purchase arrangement the house was subsequently sold on May 11, 2001, to the newly formed non-profit The Westcott House Foundation.

The Westcott House Foundation was organized by a devoted group of Springfield preservationists and benefactors, bolstered with a multi-year $3.5 million grant from the local Turner Foundation, they bought the house from the Conservancy and committed to restore the all-but-lost historic residence. Chambers, Murphy and Burge of Akron, Ohio, and Schooley Caldwell Associates of Columbus, Ohio, were secured to be the lead architectural firms for the project. The nearly 5-year, $5.8 million, restoration of the Westcott House was completed in 2005, and was governed by goals and objectives set forth by the Westcott House Foundation and the Frank Lloyd Wright Building Conservancy. More than four hundred architects, engineers, craftspeople and volunteers contributed to the effort. Original stucco was restored, paint was removed from brick walls, and the original Ludowici tiles were replaced with new ones. The Westcott House opened to the public on October 15, 2005, in a ceremony attended by the Westcotts' grandchildren.

As of 2019, the Westcott House Foundation sponsors a lecture series, an array of educational programs for student, adults and educators, design exhibits, immersive art/multi-media events, design workshops, and social activities. The foundation strives to promote a greater understanding of Frank Lloyd Wright architecture, particularly about Wright's concept of organic architecture, design process thinking, and design education. Guided tours are offered Wednesdays through Sundays.

Since the 2005 opening, the Wescott House has received grants from the National Endowment for the Arts, Institute of Museum and Library Services and National Endowment for the Humanities.

== See also ==
- List of Frank Lloyd Wright works
- National Register of Historic Places listings in Clark County, Ohio
