= Luvena Wallace Dethridge =

American singer

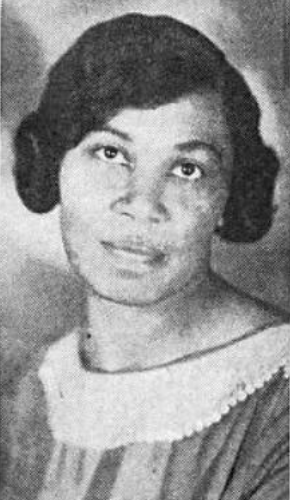
- Dethridge, from a 1930 publication
- Born: Mary Luvena Wallace; March 22, 1894; Richmond, Indiana, U.S.
- Died: September 27, 1988 (aged 94)
- Occupation: Concert singer

Mary Luvena Wallace Dethridge (March 22, 1894 – September 27, 1988) was an American concert singer based in Indiana.

== Early life and education ==
Dethridge was born in Richmond, Indiana, the daughter of Luther Wallace and Laura Wallace. Her mother died young, and Dethridge was raised by her paternal grandparents, Samuel and Mary J. Wallace. She studied with Samuel B. Garton of Earlham College, and traveled with Garton and his wife to Rome for further training in 1928 and 1930.

== Career ==
Dethridge, a lyric soprano, was a concert singer in the 1930s and 1940s, including appearances in Rome and at New York's Town Hall venue. In 1933 she sang at the Century of Progress Exposition in Chicago. In 1937, 1938, and 1939, she sang and spoke at Quaker programs in Indiana. "Incidentally, we have learned the secret of how to secure a large audience—take Mrs. Dethridge along to sing," wrote the program organizers in 1938. Also in 1938, she sang the lead in The Nightingale, when the opera was produced in Richmond. An Ohio newspaper in 1948 noted her ability to sing in a range of languages "with much feeling and clear enunciation and perfect diction", and that "her power of the pianissimo is extraordinary."

In 1961, during the centenary of the start of the American Civil War, Dethridge spoke and gave an oral history interview about her grandfather, who was born into slavery in Virginia, and who taught her some of the traditional spirituals she sang. "Grandfather often said that the master could own the body but not the soul of the slave," she recalled.

== Personal life ==
Wallace married Boston D. Dethridge in 1909. She and her husband worked in a hospital. Her husband died in 1979, and she died in 1988, at the age of 94. Her papers were collected during the Black Women in the Middle West Project, and are in the library of the Indiana Historical Society.
