= Boston, Indiana =

- Town
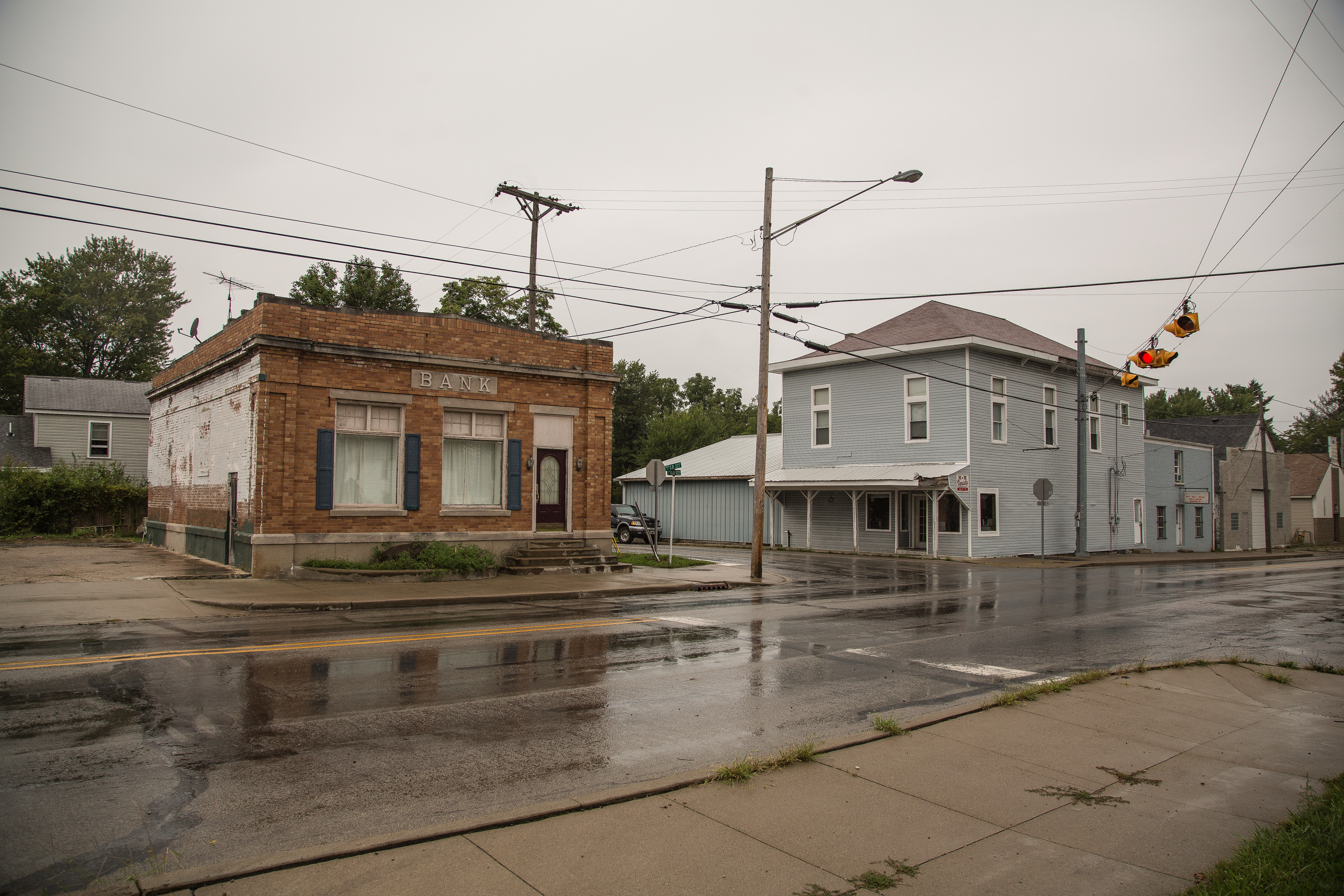

- Location of Boston in Wayne County, Indiana.
- Coordinates: 39°44′28″N 84°51′06″W
- Country: United States
- State: Indiana
- County: Wayne
- Township: Boston

Area
  - Total: 0.22 sq mi (0.58 km^{2})
  - Land: 0.22 sq mi (0.58 km^{2})
  - Water: 0 sq mi (0.00 km^{2})
- Elevation: 1,132 ft (345 m)

Population (2020)
  - Total: 150
  - Density: 672.5/sq mi (259.65/km^{2})
- Time zone: UTC-5 (Eastern (EST))
  - Summer (DST): UTC-5 (EST)
- ZIP code: 47324
- Area code: 765
- FIPS code: 18-06652
- GNIS ID: 2396597

Boston is a town in Boston Township, Wayne County, Indiana, United States. As of the 2020 census, Boston had a population of 150.

== History ==
Boston was named after Boston, Massachusetts.

Boston was originally called New Boston, and under the latter name was laid out and platted in 1832. The first post office in Boston was established in 1837.

On June 26, 1849, a cholera outbreak began, with the first death occurring the following day. Of the 120 residents at the time, 53 residents died over the following 5 weeks.

The Boston Township Council is composed of five members with a council president.

== Geography ==
According to the 2010 census, Boston has a total area of 0.21 square miles (0.54 km^{2}), all land.

== Demographics ==
Historical population
Census	Pop.	Note	%±
1880	137		—
1890	146		6.6%
1900	134		−8.2%
1910	122		−9.0%
1920	190		55.7%
1930	184		−3.2%
1940	182		−1.1%
1950	257		41.2%
1960	240		−6.6%
1970	210		−12.5%
1980	189		−10.0%
1990	159		−15.9%
2000	177		11.3%
2010	138		−22.0%
2020	150		8.7%
U.S. Decennial Census

=== 2010 census ===
As of the 2010 census, there were 138 people, 60 households, and 41 families living in the town. The population density was 657.1 inhabitants per square mile (253.7/km^{2}). There were 67 housing units at an average density of 319.0 per square mile (123.2/km^{2}). The racial makeup of the town was 97.8% White, 0.7% Native American, and 1.4% Asian.

There were 60 households, of which 30.0% had children under the age of 18 living with them, 58.3% were married couples living together, 6.7% had a female householder with no husband present, 3.3% had a male householder with no wife present, and 31.7% were non-families. 25.0% of all households were made up of individuals, and 11.7% had someone living alone who was 65 years of age or older. The average household size was 2.30 and the average family size was 2.68.

The median age in the town was 42 years. 22.5% of residents were under the age of 18; 5% were between the ages of 18 and 24; 26.7% were from 25 to 44; 26% were from 45 to 64; and 19.6% were 65 years of age or older. The gender makeup of the town was 52.2% male and 47.8% female.

=== 2000 census ===
As of the 2000 census, there were 177 people, 67 households, and 52 families living in the town. The population density was 838.5 inhabitants per square mile (323.7/km^{2}). There were 70 housing units at an average density of 331.6 per square mile (128.0/km^{2}). The racial makeup of the town was 99.44% White, and 0.56% from two or more races. Hispanic or Latino of any race were 0.56% of the population.

There were 67 households, out of which 37.3% had children under the age of 18 living with them, 68.7% were married couples living together, 7.5% had a female householder with no husband present, and 20.9% were non-families. 17.9% of all households were made up of individuals, and 9.0% had someone living alone who was 65 years of age or older. The average household size was 2.64 and the average family size was 3.02.

In the town, the population was spread out, with 24.9% under the age of 18, 8.5% from 18 to 24, 34.5% from 25 to 44, 22.0% from 45 to 64, and 10.2% who were 65 years of age or older. The median age was 35 years. For every 100 females, there were 98.9 males. For every 100 females age 18 and over, there were 92.8 males.

The median income for a household in the town was $50,625, and the median income for a family was $46,875. Males had a median income of $35,625 versus $20,179 for females. The per capita income for the town was $19,852. None of the families and 2.5% of the population were living below the poverty line.

== Infrastructure ==
Richmond Municipal Airport is located near Boston.

== Notable people ==
- De Scott Evans, artist
