= Richmond Municipal Airport =

- IATA: RID; ICAO: KRID; FAA LID: RID

Summary
- Airport type: Public
- Owner: Richmond BOAC
- Serves: Richmond, Indiana
- Elevation AMSL: 1,140 ft / 347 m
- Coordinates: 39°45′22″N 084°50′34″W

Map

Runways
Direction	Length		Surface
Direction	ft	m	Surface
6/24	5,502	1,677	Asphalt
15/33	4,999	1,524	Asphalt

Statistics (2018)
- Aircraft operations: 14,720
- Based aircraft: 40
- Source: Federal Aviation Administration

Richmond Municipal Airport (IATA: RID, ICAO: KRID, FAA LID: RID) is six miles southeast of Richmond near Boston, in Wayne County, Indiana. It is owned by the Richmond Board of Aviation Commissioners. The National Plan of Integrated Airport Systems for 2011–2015 called it a general aviation facility.

The first airline flights were TWA and Delta DC-3s in late 1947; Lake Central replaced them in 1950-51 and dropped Richmond in 1965.

== Facilities ==
The airport covers 702 acres (284 ha) at an elevation of 1,140 feet (347 m). It has two asphalt runways: 6/24 is 5,502 by 150 feet (1,677 x 46 m) and 15/33 is 4,999 by 100 feet (1,524 x 30 m).

In the year ending December 31, 2018 the airport had 14,720 aircraft operations, average 40 per day: 97% general aviation, 2% air taxi, and 1% military. 40 aircraft were then based at the airport: 34 single-engine, 4 helicopter, and 2 multi-engine.

== Accidents and incidents ==
- On December 15, 1952, a Lake Central Airlines Douglas DC-3 and a Cessna 170 collided as both aircraft landed simultaneously on intersecting runways at Richmond Municipal Airport in light snow and fog. The Cessna was destroyed and the pilot was killed but all nine occupants on the DC-3 survived with no injuries. The DC-3 received minor damage and was later returned to service.
- On February 11, 2019, a chartered Beech 400 corporate jet overran the runway and crossed a field and a road before coming to rest; the two crew and sole passenger were uninjured. The National Transportation Safety Board determined the aircraft touched down 3,200 feet down the 5,502 foot runway with snow on the runway surface and a tailwind. After the landing the pilots discovered the airport was closed at the time.

== See also ==
- List of airports in Indiana
