= Carole Wantz =

Indiana painter and sculptor (born 1940)

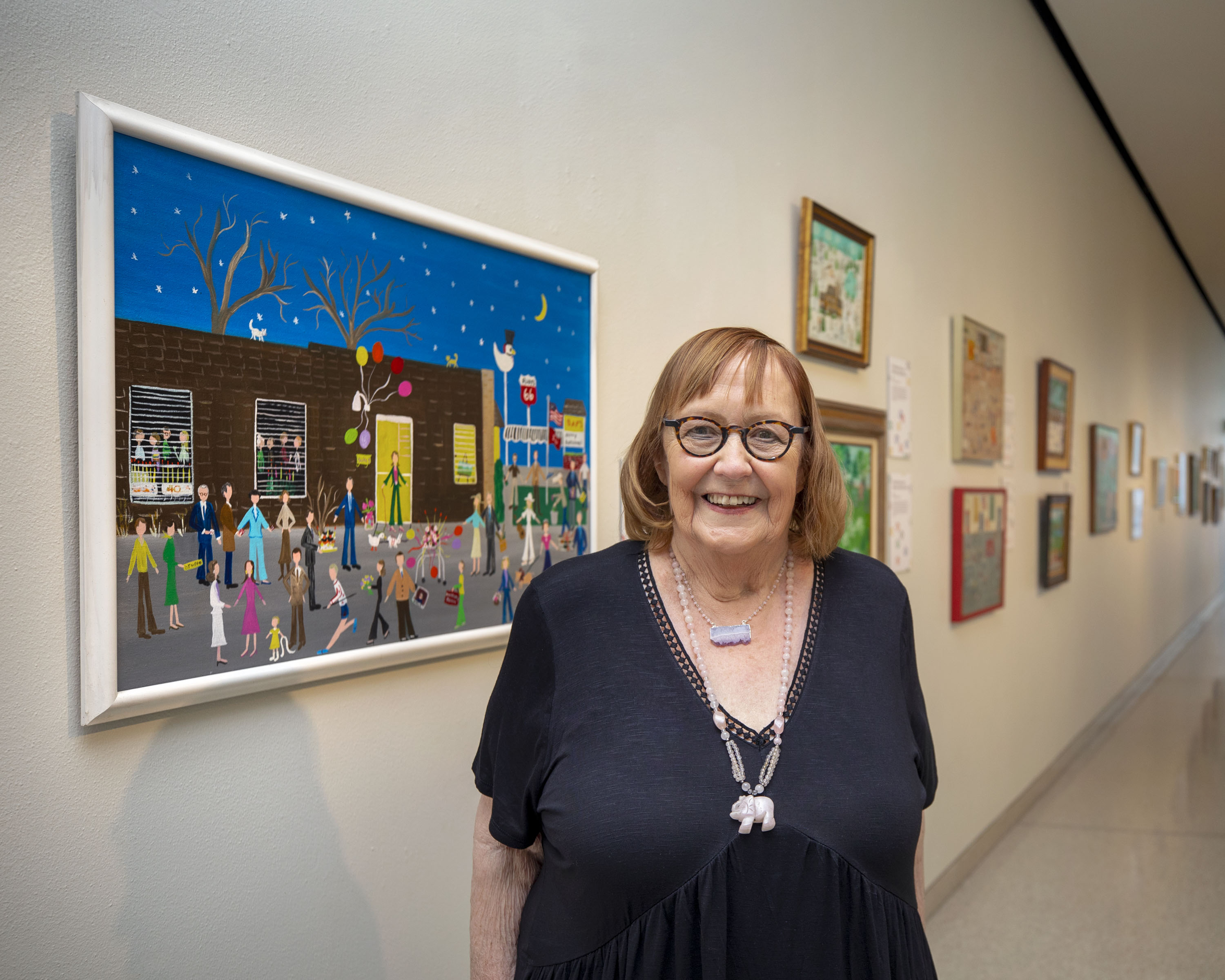
- Carole Wantz at the Indiana State Museum in 2021 in front of one of her artworks.
- Born: Carole Golay; 25 March 1940; Richmond, Indiana
- Known for: Painting, drawing, printmaking
- Movement: Contemporary art
- Children: Betsy Maddox; John Wantz

Carole Wantz is a folk artist from Richmond, Indiana. She specializes in creating portrait paintings of people and families that highlight their lives, accomplishments, and contributions to their communities.

== Background and history ==
She began painting in her early thirties following an art class taught by Anthony Vestutto. She found inspiration in the work of Grandma Moses. One of her first commissioned portraits was for J. Irwin Miller, an industrialist in Columbus, Indiana, and a prominent figure at Cummins. She was also commissioned by the Columbus Chamber of Commerce to create a painting to depict Miller's life story.

After being commissioned by Miller to create a portrait for his home, Wantz completed the painting, which he hung in his home. Wantz went on to complete over 150 commissioned art pieces in the 1970s and 1980s.

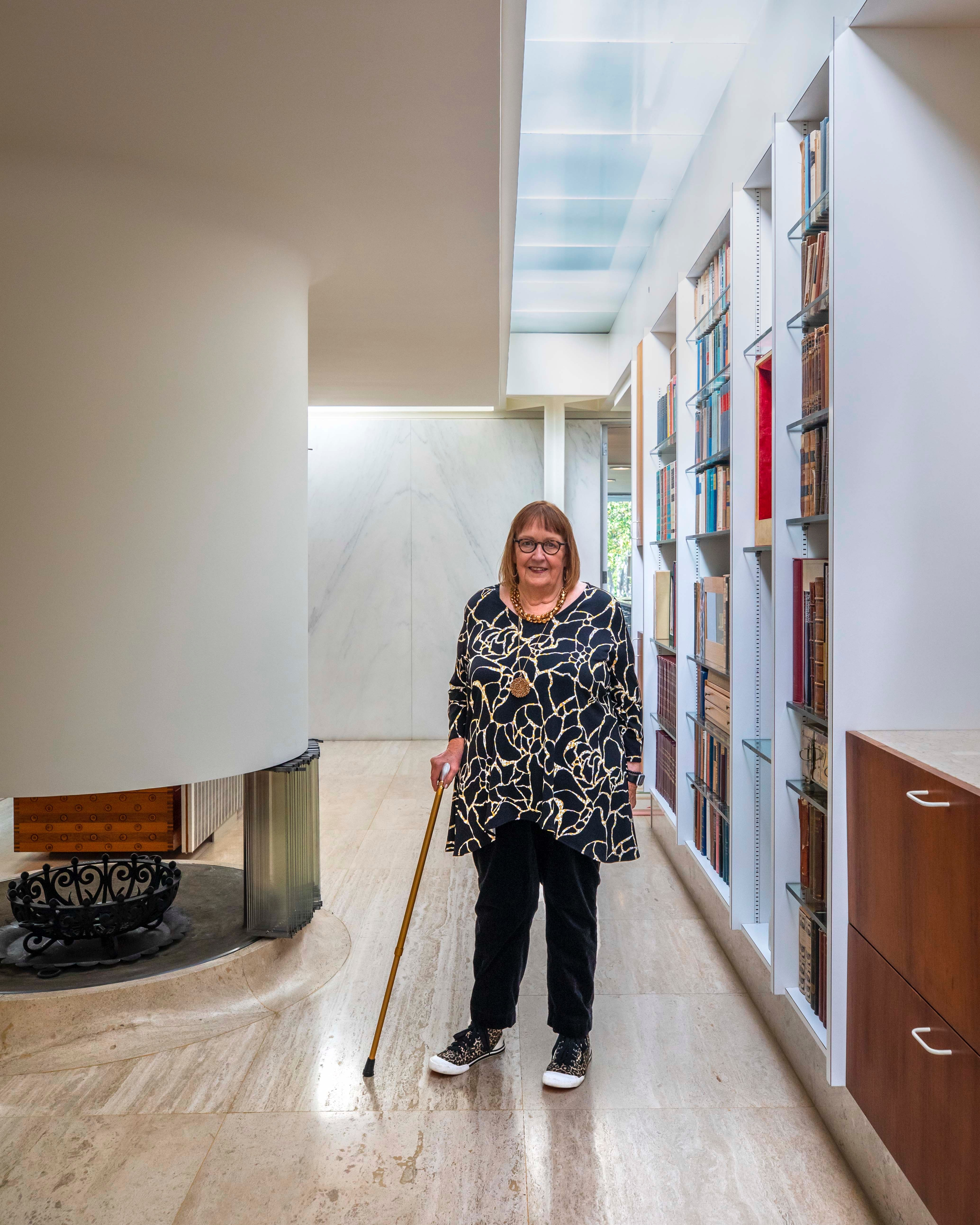
Carole Wantz inside the Miller House in Columbus, Indiana

== Artistic approach ==
Wantz's artistic style draws inspiration from everyday life, portraying people engaged in playful activities. She conducts research and interviews the subject beforehand, gathering details about their life, achievements, and relationships, often studying family home videos of her subjects.

Her portraits incorporate background elements depicted in equal scale to foreground items, and incorporates recognizable Columbus landmarks into her work, such as the Cleo Rogers Memorial Library, the Large Arch sculpture, the tower of First Christian Church, and North Christian Church. Another characteristic of her work is the faces of individuals in her portraits lack distinct features. Wantz's portraits often include the subject as well as significant figures from their life, such as family members or pets.

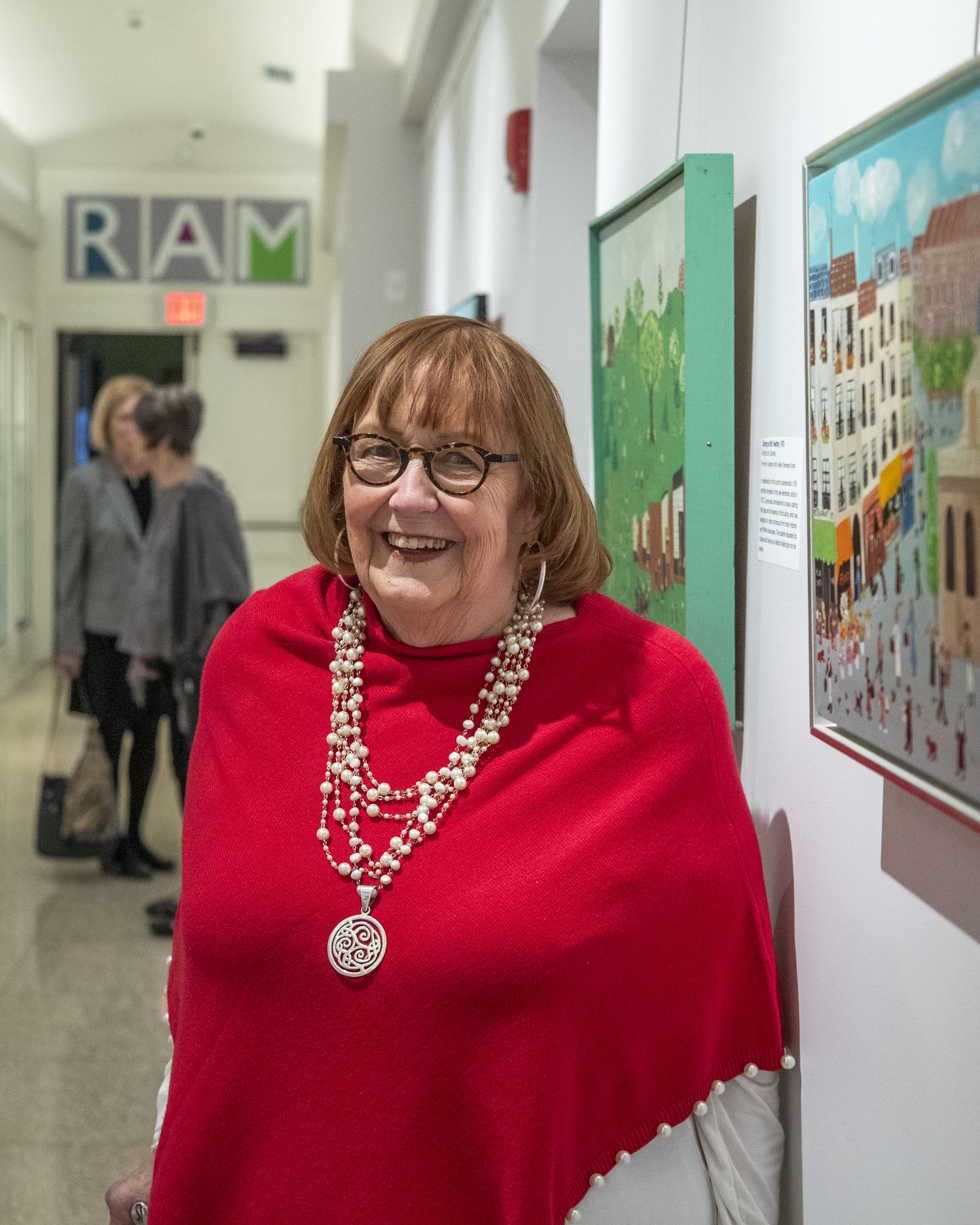
Carole Wantz at the Richmond Art Museum in 2022

== Exhibitions ==
Wantz's work has been featured in several media outlets and exhibited in various art museums. In 2021, her portraits were displayed at the Indiana State Museum in a collection called The Artwork of Carole Wantz: Collected Stories from Columbus, Indiana, as well as in a temporary exhibition at the Richmond Art Museum from February to April 2022. Her paintings were also displayed at the Bartholomew County Historical Society, where her paintings were used contributed to frame Columbus's history. Wantz was also featured in an article in The New York Times in May 2021.

== Collections ==
Wantz's work is held in the permanent collection of the Indiana State Museum.
