= Burton J. Westcott =

American businessman (1868–1926)

Burton J. Westcott (1868–1926) was an American automobile manufacturer and politician from Ohio. He served as the president of the town council of Springfield, Ohio.

== Life ==
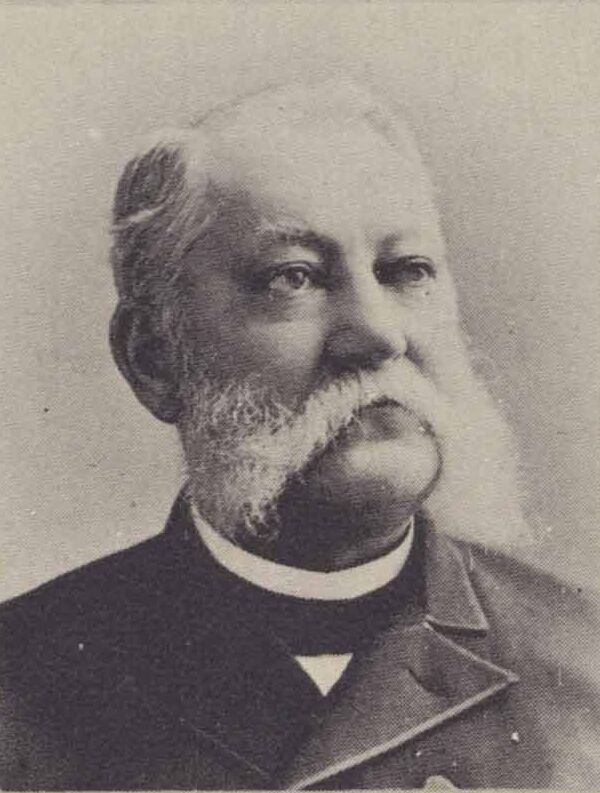
Portrait of John M. Westcott in an 1893 publication

He was born in Richmond, Indiana, a son of John M. Westcott, who was the founder and president of the Hoosier Drill Company, a noted manufacturer of farm implements. A lover and breeder of horses, the elder Westcott founded the Westcott Carriage Company in 1896, and his son took an active interest in both businesses. Educated at DePauw University and Swarthmore College, Burton Westcott proved a capable executive and eventually rose to become treasurer of the Hoosier Drill Company. A 1903 corporate merger involving Hoosier Drill, Superior Drill, and several other firms created the American Seeding Machine Company. Its executive offices were located in Springfield on the southwest corner of Liberty Avenue and Plum Street. That year Burton Westcott, newly elected treasurer of the corporation, arrived to make his home in Springfield. It was a position he would hold for the next twenty-one years.

=== Years in Springfield, Ohio ===
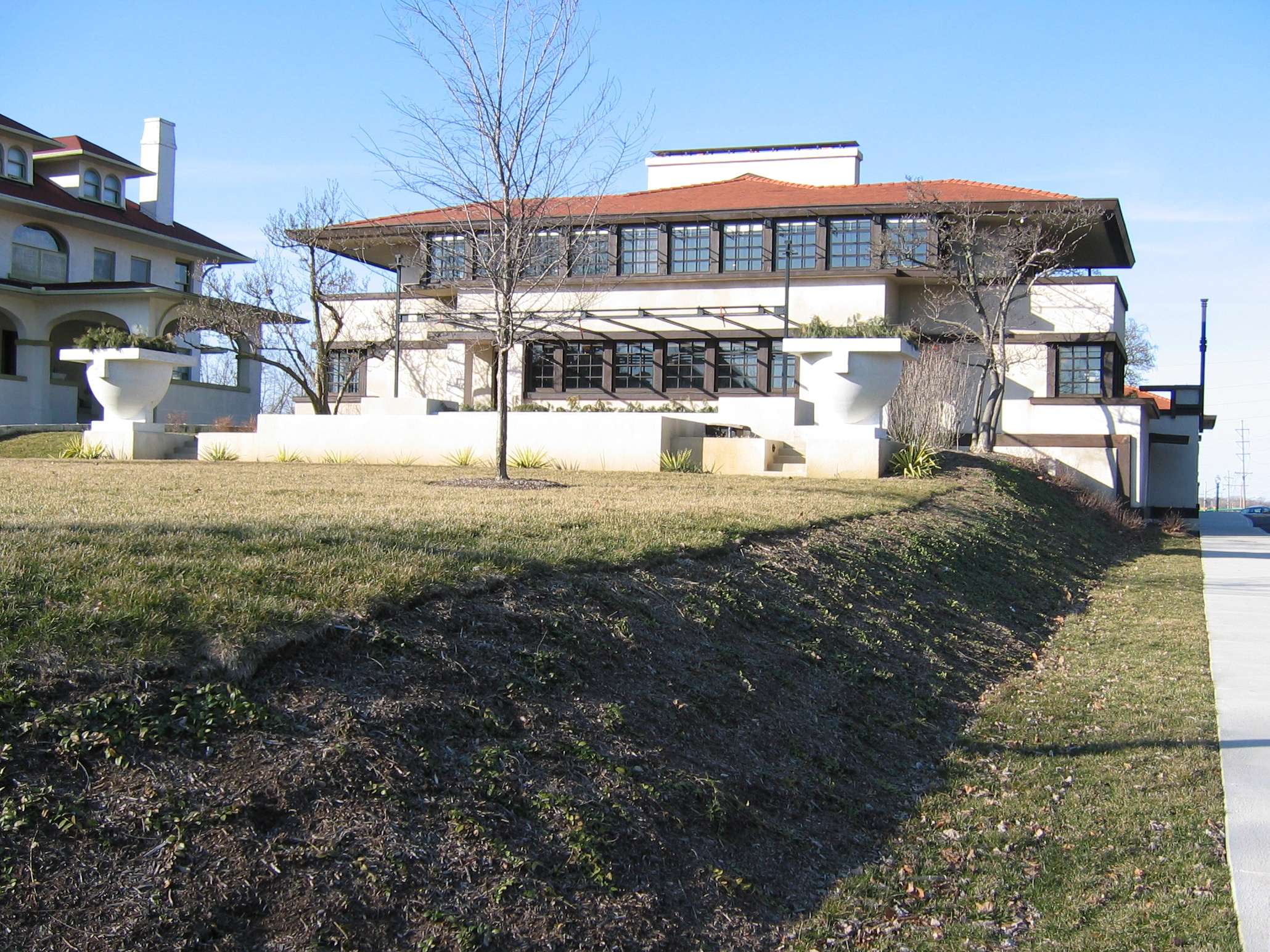
Westcott's house in Springfield

The elder Westcott continued to prefer horses to motor cars, and, in 1916, Burton Westcott brought the Westcott Motor Car Company to Springfield, presiding over the firm as president until 1924. The Westcott Carriage Company continued in Richmond as a separate corporation, while the Springfield firm began to manufacture luxury touring cars, which enjoyed a brief popularity in this country after World War I. Few automobiles of this time tended to rival the Westcott touring car in its splendor and appointments, as a full-page advertisement in the October 9, 1920, Saturday Evening Post touted. Hand-assembled from parts manufactured elsewhere, the Westcott motor car was produced in large buildings, valued at more than $150,000, on Warder Street.

Westcott was an early member of the Springfield Country Club and a director of the Lagonda National Bank. He served on the Springfield Town Council from 1916 to 1922. He was elected president of the Town Council in 1921, a position equivalent to mayor. A staunch Republican, he had admirers from both political parties, and there was general agreement that he helped to curb fairly widespread corruption in the city's administrative affairs, thereby placing Springfield on a firm financial foundation.

Westcott's home, Westcott House designed by Frank Lloyd Wright, has been restored as a museum in Springfield.

=== Passing ===
Somewhat despondent over the sudden death of his wife in 1923, Westcott saw his own health begin to fail. The Westcott Motor Car Company was placed in receivership in January 1925, and was sold at auction to a syndicate of local Springfield businessmen in April of that year. After a series of illnesses, Burton Westcott died in his home on East High Street on January 10, 1926.

== See also ==
- Westcott House
