= Richmond, Indiana =

- City
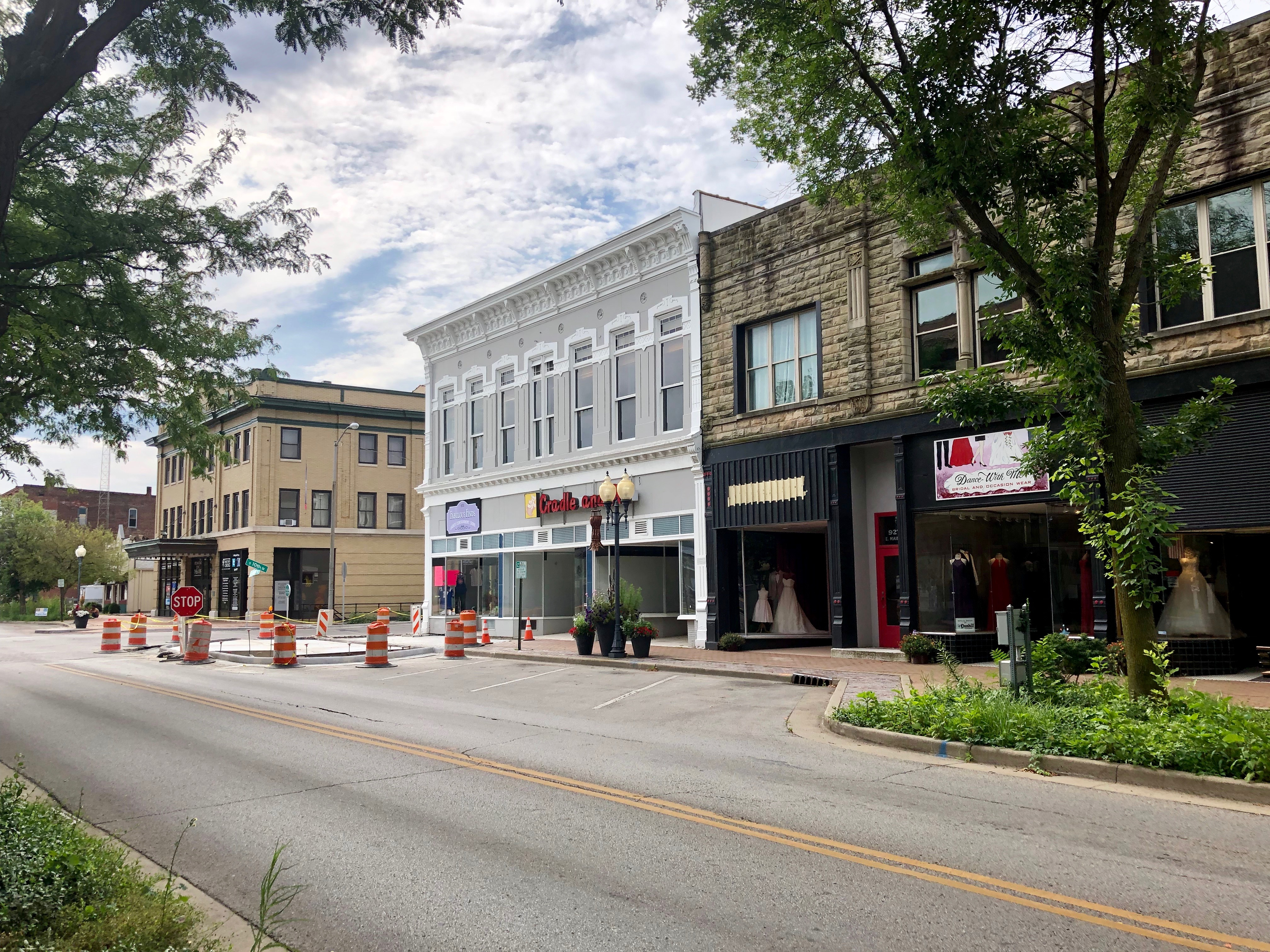
- Richmond Downtown Historic District

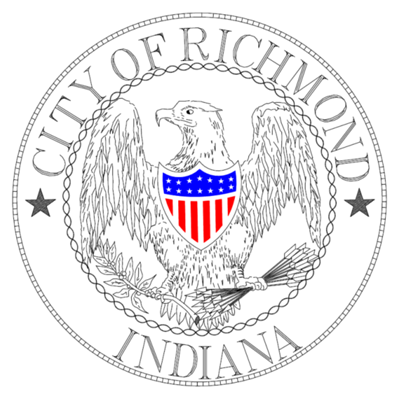
- Flag Seal
- Nickname: City of Roses
- Location of Richmond in Wayne County, Indiana.
- Coordinates: 39°49′54″N 84°52′26″W
- Country: United States
- State: Indiana
- County: Wayne
- Townships: Boston, Center, Wayne, Webster

Government
  - Mayor: Ron Oler (R)

Area
  - Total: 24.15 sq mi (62.56 km^{2})
  - Land: 24.00 sq mi (62.17 km^{2})
  - Water: 0.15 sq mi (0.39 km^{2})
- Elevation: 978 ft (298 m)

Population (2020)
  - Total: 35,720
  - Density: 1,488.1/sq mi (574.54/km^{2})
- Time zone: UTC−5 (EST)
  - Summer (DST): UTC−4 (EDT)
- ZIP codes: 47374-47375
- Area code: 765
- FIPS code: 18-64260
- GNIS feature ID: 2396366
- Website: richmondindiana.gov

Richmond (/ˈrɪtʃmənd/) is a city in eastern Wayne County, Indiana, United States. Bordering the state of Ohio, it is the county seat of Wayne County. In the 2020 census, the city had a population of 35,720. It is the principal city of the Richmond micropolitan area. Situated largely within Wayne Township, its area includes a non-contiguous portion in nearby Boston Township, where Richmond Municipal Airport is located.

Richmond is sometimes called the "cradle of recorded jazz" because the earliest jazz recordings and records were made at the studio of Gennett Records, a division of the Starr Piano Company. Gennett Records was the first to record such artists as Louis Armstrong, Bix Beiderbecke, Jelly Roll Morton, Hoagy Carmichael, Lawrence Welk, and Gene Autry. The city has twice received the All-America City Award, most recently in 2009.

== History ==
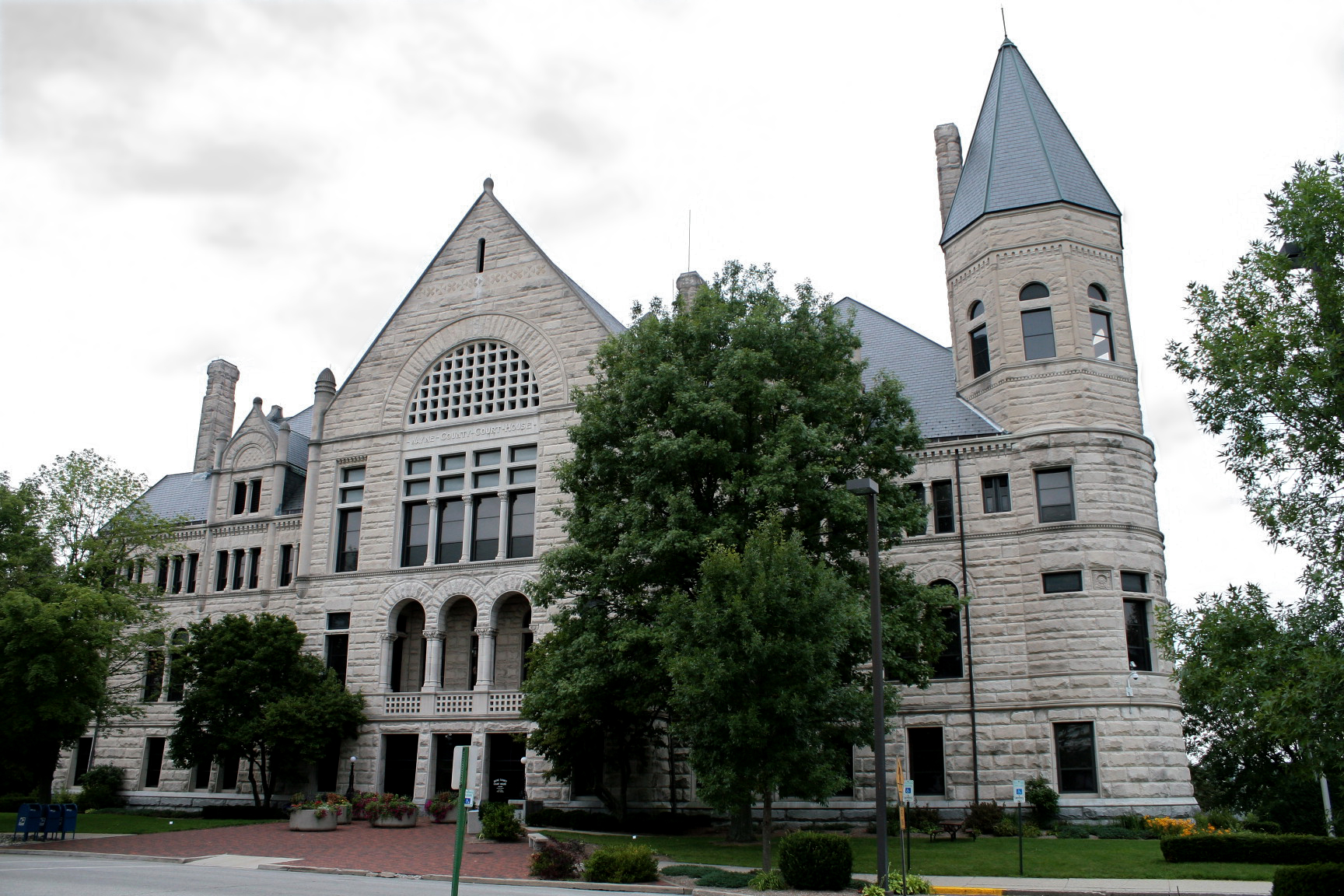
Wayne County Courthouse

In 1806 the first European Americans in the area, Quaker families from the state of North Carolina, settled along the East Fork of the Whitewater River. This was part of a general westward migration in the early decades after the American Revolution. John Smith and Jeremiah Cox were two of the earliest settlers, and the area that was to become Richmond was originally divided into the towns of Smithville and Coxborough (also known as Jericho). Richmond is still home to several Quaker institutions, including Friends United Meeting, Richmond Friends School, Earlham College and the Earlham School of Religion.

In 1818, Smithville amalgamated with Coxborough and incorporated as the town of Richmond. The name is believed to refer to the area's "rich soil" (from the Old French riche (rich/wealthy) and mont (hill)). The first post office in Richmond was established in 1818 with Robert Morrison as the first postmaster. The town was officially incorporated as a city in 1840, with John Sailor elected the first mayor.

Early cinema and television pioneer Charles Francis Jenkins grew up on a farm north of Richmond, where he began inventing useful gadgets. As the Richmond Telegram reported, on June 6, 1894, Jenkins gathered his family, friends and newsmen at his cousin's jewelry store in downtown Richmond and projected a filmed motion picture for the first time in front of an audience. The motion picture was of a vaudeville entertainer performing a butterfly dance, which Jenkins had filmed himself. Jenkins filed for a patent for the Phantoscope projector in November 1894 and it was issued in March 1895. A modified version of the Phantoscope was later sold to Thomas Edison, who named it Edison's Vitascope and began projecting motion pictures in New York City vaudeville theaters, raising the curtain on American cinema.

Joseph E. Maddy is credited with founding the country's first complete high school orchestra at Richmond, and later founded the National High School Orchestra Camp, which became the Interlochen Center for the Arts in Michigan.

Hoagy Carmichael recorded "Stardust" for the first time in Richmond at the Gennett recording studio. Famed trumpeter and singer Louis Armstrong was first recorded at Gennett as a member of King Oliver and his Creole Jazz Band. Many other internationally famous musicians recorded at Gennett's Richmond facility, including Jelly Roll Morton, Bix Beiderbecke, Duke Ellington, and Fats Waller. Gennett also recorded Klan musicians.

A group of artists in the area in the late 19th and early 20th centuries came to be known as the Richmond Group. They included John Elwood Bundy, Charles Conner, George Herbert Baker, Maude Kaufman Eggemeyer and John Albert Seaford. The Richmond Art Museum has a collection of regional and American art. Many consider the most significant painting in the collection to be a self-portrait of Indiana-born William Merritt Chase.

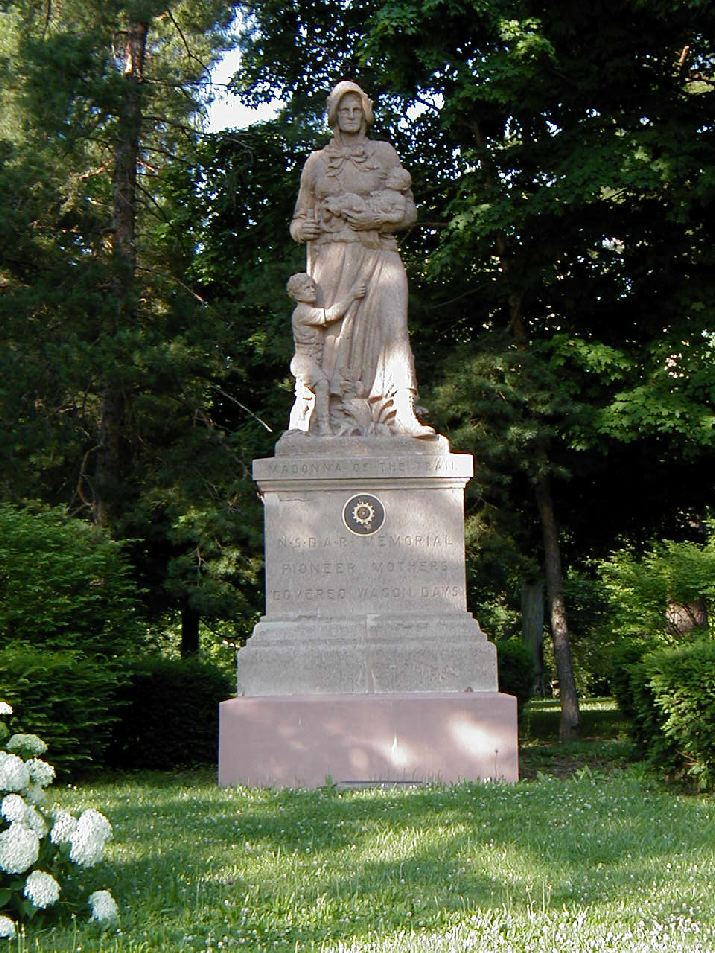
Madonna of the Trail, one of a series of 12 identical monuments dedicated to the spirit of pioneer women in the United States

The city was connected to the National Road, the first road built by the federal government and a major route west for pioneers of the 19th century. It became part of the system of National Auto Trails. The highway is now known as U.S. Route 40. One of the extant Madonna of the Trail monuments was dedicated at Richmond on October 28, 1928. It sits in a corner of Glen Miller Park adjacent to US 40.

Richmond's cultural resources include two of Indiana's three Egyptian mummies. One is held by the Wayne County Historical Museum and the other by Earlham College's Joseph Moore Museum, leading to the local nickname "Mummy capital of Indiana".

The arts were supported by a strong economy increasingly based on manufacturing. Richmond was once known as "the lawnmower capital" because it was a center for manufacturing of lawnmowers from the late 19th century through the mid-20th century. Manufacturers included Davis, Motomower, Dille-McGuire and F&N. The farm machinery builder Gaar-Scott was based in Richmond. The Davis Aircraft Co., builder of a light parasol wing monoplane, operated in Richmond beginning in 1929.

After starting out in nearby Union City, Wayne Agricultural Works moved to Richmond. Wayne manufactured horse-drawn vehicles, including the "kid hack", a precursor of the motorized school bus. From the early 1930s through the 1940s, Richmond had several automobile designers and manufacturers. Among the automobiles locally manufactured were the Richmond, built by the Wayne Works; the "Rodefeld"; the Davis; the Pilot; the Westcott; and the Crosley. In the 1950s Wayne Works changed its name to Wayne Corporation, by then a well-known bus and school-bus manufacturer. In 1967 it relocated to a site adjacent to Interstate 70. The company was a leader in school-bus safety innovations, but closed in 1992 during a period of school-bus manufacturing industry consolidations.

Richmond was known as the "Rose City" because of the many varieties once grown there by Hill's Roses. The company had several sprawling complexes of greenhouses, with a total of about 34 acres (14 ha) under glass. The annual Richmond Rose Festival honored the rose industry and was a popular summer attraction.

=== Downtown explosion ===
On April 6, 1968, an explosion triggered by a natural gas leak destroyed or damaged several downtown blocks and killed 41 people; more than 150 were injured. The event is documented in the book Death in a Sunny Street: The Civil Defense Story of the Richmond, Indiana Disaster, April 6, 1968, compiled by Esther Kellner.

== Geography ==
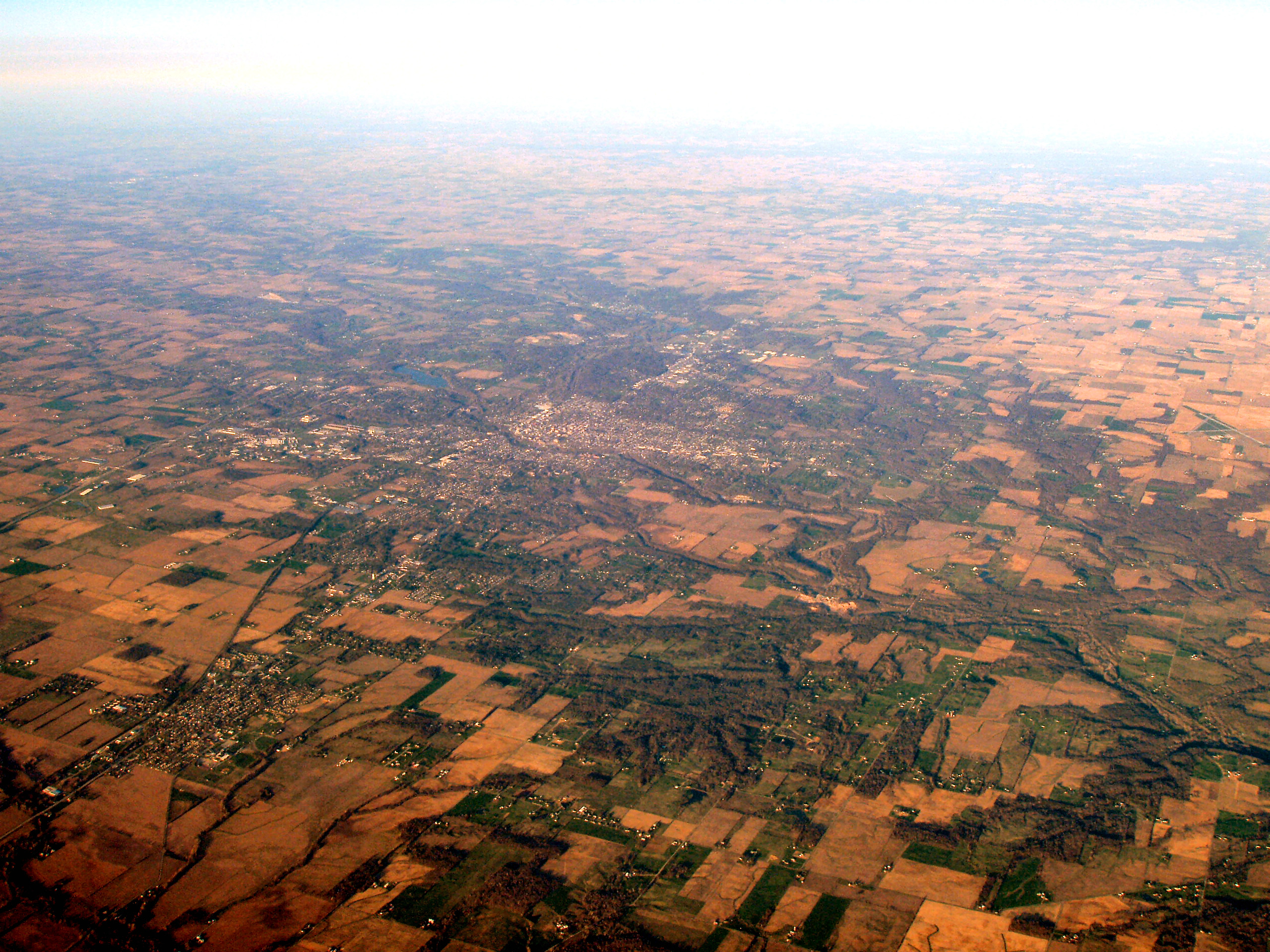
Richmond lies on the flatland of eastern Indiana

According to the 2010 census, Richmond has a total area of 24.067 square miles (62.33 km^{2}), of which 23.91 square miles (61.93 km^{2}) (or 99.35%) is land and 0.157 square miles (0.41 km^{2}) (or 0.65%) is water.

Richmond is located about 12 miles S of Hoosier Hill, the highest point in Indiana.

=== Cityscape ===
Richmond is noted for its rich stock of historic architecture. In 2003, a book entitled Richmond Indiana: Its Physical Development and Aesthetic Heritage to 1920 by Cornell University architectural historians, Michael and Mary Raddant Tomlan, was published by the Indiana Historical Society. Particularly notable buildings are the 1902 Pennsylvania Railroad Station designed by Daniel H. Burnham of Chicago and the 1893 Wayne County Court House designed by James W. McLaughlin of Cincinnati. Local architects of note include John A. Hasecoster, William S. Kaufman and Stephen O. Yates.

The significance of the architecture has been recognized. Five large districts, such as the Depot District, and several individual buildings are listed in the National Register of Historic Places, the Historic American Buildings Survey and the Historic American Engineering Record.

=== Climate ===
Climate data for Richmond, Indiana (1991–2020 normals, extremes 1968–present)
Month	Jan	Feb	Mar	Apr	May	Jun	Jul	Aug	Sep	Oct	Nov	Dec	Year
Record high °F (°C)	67 (19)	78 (26)	85 (29)	87 (31)	94 (34)	104 (40)	102 (39)	100 (38)	100 (38)	91 (33)	80 (27)	72 (22)	104 (40)
Mean maximum °F (°C)	58.3 (14.6)	63.0 (17.2)	72.5 (22.5)	81.1 (27.3)	88.0 (31.1)	92.2 (33.4)	92.6 (33.7)	91.7 (33.2)	90.0 (32.2)	82.7 (28.2)	70.2 (21.2)	61.5 (16.4)	94.5 (34.7)
Mean daily maximum °F (°C)	36.2 (2.3)	40.3 (4.6)	50.8 (10.4)	63.8 (17.7)	73.7 (23.2)	82.0 (27.8)	84.8 (29.3)	83.6 (28.7)	77.6 (25.3)	65.5 (18.6)	51.7 (10.9)	40.4 (4.7)	62.5 (16.9)
Daily mean °F (°C)	27.9 (−2.3)	31.2 (−0.4)	40.8 (4.9)	52.2 (11.2)	62.6 (17.0)	71.1 (21.7)	74.2 (23.4)	72.7 (22.6)	65.9 (18.8)	54.2 (12.3)	42.2 (5.7)	32.6 (0.3)	52.3 (11.3)
Mean daily minimum °F (°C)	19.6 (−6.9)	22.2 (−5.4)	30.8 (−0.7)	40.7 (4.8)	51.5 (10.8)	60.2 (15.7)	63.5 (17.5)	61.8 (16.6)	54.2 (12.3)	42.9 (6.1)	32.7 (0.4)	24.7 (−4.1)	42.1 (5.6)
Mean minimum °F (°C)	−3.8 (−19.9)	1.9 (−16.7)	11.9 (−11.2)	24.7 (−4.1)	35.4 (1.9)	47.0 (8.3)	52.5 (11.4)	51.0 (10.6)	40.1 (4.5)	28.1 (−2.2)	17.8 (−7.9)	5.5 (−14.7)	−7.5 (−21.9)
Record low °F (°C)	−27 (−33)	−20 (−29)	−9 (−23)	14 (−10)	26 (−3)	36 (2)	42 (6)	41 (5)	30 (−1)	16 (−9)	6 (−14)	−22 (−30)	−27 (−33)
Average precipitation inches (mm)	3.20 (81)	2.25 (57)	3.42 (87)	4.27 (108)	4.63 (118)	4.80 (122)	4.32 (110)	3.27 (83)	3.12 (79)	3.16 (80)	3.32 (84)	3.10 (79)	42.86 (1,089)
Average precipitation days (≥ 0.01 in)	13.0	10.5	11.5	11.9	13.5	11.4	10.6	8.4	8.7	9.8	9.5	12.4	131.2
Source: NOAA

== Demographics ==
Historical population
Census	Pop.	Note	%±
1840	2,070		—
1850	1,443		−30.3%
1860	6,608		357.9%
1870	9,445		42.9%
1880	12,742		34.9%
1890	16,608		30.3%
1900	18,226		9.7%
1910	22,824		25.2%
1920	26,765		17.3%
1930	32,493		21.4%
1940	35,147		8.2%
1950	39,539		12.5%
1960	44,149		11.7%
1970	43,999		−0.3%
1980	41,349		−6.0%
1990	38,705		−6.4%
2000	39,124		1.1%
2010	36,812		−5.9%
2020	35,720		−3.0%
Source: US Census Bureau

=== 2020 census ===
As of the 2020 census, Richmond had a population of 35,720. The median age was 39.4 years. 21.5% of residents were under the age of 18 and 19.2% of residents were 65 years of age or older. For every 100 females there were 91.1 males, and for every 100 females age 18 and over there were 88.0 males age 18 and over.

99.4% of residents lived in urban areas, while 0.6% lived in rural areas.

There were 15,167 households in Richmond, of which 26.1% had children under the age of 18 living in them. Of all households, 32.6% were married-couple households, 22.4% were households with a male householder and no spouse or partner present, and 35.8% were households with a female householder and no spouse or partner present. About 37.7% of all households were made up of individuals and 15.4% had someone living alone who was 65 years of age or older.

There were 17,429 housing units, of which 13.0% were vacant. The homeowner vacancy rate was 3.4% and the rental vacancy rate was 10.9%.

Racial composition as of the 2020 census
Race	Number	Percent
White	28,368	79.4%
Black or African American	2,865	8.0%
American Indian and Alaska Native	148	0.4%
Asian	591	1.7%
Native Hawaiian and Other Pacific Islander	13	0.0%
Some other race	1,163	3.3%
Two or more races	2,572	7.2%
Hispanic or Latino (of any race)	2,015	5.6%

=== 2010 census ===
As of the census of 2010, there were 36,812 people, 15,098 households, and 8,909 families residing in the city. The population density was 1,539.0 inhabitants per square mile (594.2/km^{2}). There were 17,649 housing units at an average density of 737.8 per square mile (284.9/km^{2}). The racial makeup of the city was 83.9% White, 8.6% African American, 0.3% Native American, 1.1% Asian, 0.1% Pacific Islander, 1.9% from other races, and 4.0% from two or more races. Hispanic or Latino of any race were 4.1% of the population.

There were 15,098 households, of which 28.8% had children under the age of 18 living with them, 37.5% were married couples living together, 16.3% had a female householder with no husband present, 5.3% had a male householder with no wife present, and 41.0% were non-families. 34.2% of all households were made up of individuals, and 13.5% had someone living alone who was 65 years of age or older. The average household size was 2.29 and the average family size was 2.91.

The median age in the city was 38.4 years. 22.1% of residents were under the age of 18; 11.4% were between the ages of 18 and 24; 24.4% were from 25 to 44; 25.6% were from 45 to 64; and 16.5% were 65 years of age or older. The gender makeup of the city was 47.9% male and 52.1% female.

=== 2000 census ===
As of the census of 2000, there were 39,124 people, 16,287 households, and 9,918 families residing in the city. The population density was 1,685.3 inhabitants per square mile (650.7/km^{2}). There were 17,647 housing units at an average density of 760.2 per square mile (293.5/km^{2}). The racial makeup of the city was 86.78% White, 8.87% African American, 0.27% Native American, 0.80% Asian, 0.06% Pacific Islander, 1.09% from other races, and 2.14% from two or more races. Hispanic or Latino of any race were 2.03% of the population.

There were 16,287 households, out of which 27.8% had children under the age of 18 living with them, 43.1% were married couples living together, 13.9% had a female householder with no husband present, and 39.1% were non-families. 33.0% of all households were made up of individuals, and 13.7% had someone living alone who was 65 years of age or older. The average household size was 2.29 and the average family size was 2.89.

In the city, the population was spread out, with 23.4% under the age of 18, 11.0% from 18 to 24, 27.5% from 25 to 44, 21.6% from 45 to 64, and 16.4% who were 65 years of age or older. The median age was 36 years. For every 100 females, there were 88.7 males. For every 100 females age 18 and over, there were 84.2 males.

The median income for a household in the city was $30,210, and the median income for a family was $38,346. Males had a median income of $30,849 versus $21,164 for females. The per capita income for the city was $17,096. About 12.1% of families and 15.7% of the population were below the poverty line, including 22.8% of those under age 18 and 10.8% of those age 65 or over.

== Points of interest ==
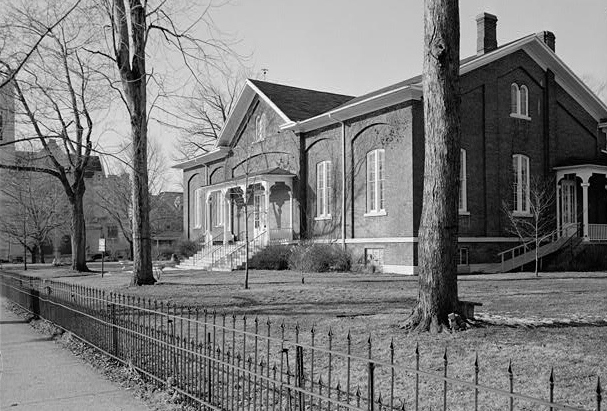
Hicksite Friends Meeting House, 1150 North A Street, Richmond, Indiana. Now houses the Wayne County Historical Museum.

- Hayes Arboretum
- Cope Environmental Center
- Wayne County Historical Museum
- Richmond Art Museum
- Indiana Football Hall of Fame
- Gaar Mansion (house museum)
- Joseph Moore Museum at Earlham College
- Glen Miller Park and Madonna of the Trail statue
- Richmond Downtown Historic District
- Old Richmond Historic District
- Starr Historic District
- Richmond Railroad Station Historic District
- Reeveston Place Historic District
- East Main Street-Glen Miller Park Historic District
- Don McBride Stadium baseball ballpark built in 1936
- Reid Memorial Presbyterian Church (Louis Comfort Tiffany-designed interior and windows, Hook and Hastings organ)
- Bethel AME Church (oldest AME church in Indiana: founded 1868)
- Old National Road Welcome Center (convention and tourism bureau)
- Whitewater Gorge Park and Gennett Walk of Fame
- Cardinal Greenway hiking trail
- Marceline Jones gravesite, Earlham Cemetery (Jim Jones's wife, who died in the Peoples Temple mass suicide)
- Richmond Civic Theatre (plays, classic movies, and children's theater)
- Madonna of the Trail statue at Glen Miller Park
- Gennett Records Walk of Fame
- Richmond Mall, shopping mall

== Education ==
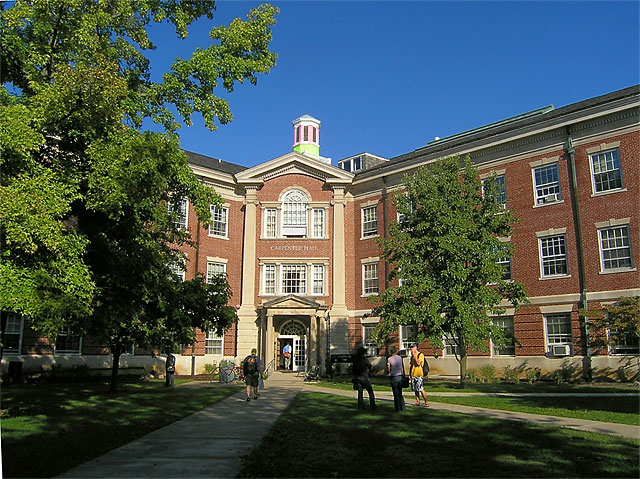
Carpenter Hall at Earlham College, founded in 1847

Richmond is home to four colleges: Earlham College, Indiana University East, Ivy Tech Community College of Indiana, and the Purdue Polytechnic Institute – Richmond. It is also home to two seminaries, the Quaker Earlham School of Religion and Church of the Brethren Bethany Theological Seminary.

Richmond High School includes the Richmond Art Museum and Civic Hall Performing Arts Center. Seton Catholic High School, a junior and senior high school, is a religious high school. It is based in the former home of St. Andrew High School (1899–1936) and, more recently, St. Andrew Elementary School, adjacent to St. Andrew Church of the Richmond Catholic Community.

The town has a lending library, the Morrisson Reeves Library.

== Religious groups ==
Richmond is the headquarters of Friends United Meeting, and hosts the Quaker Hill Conference Center, of the Religious Society of Friends (Quakers).

== Media ==
The daily newspaper is the Gannett-owned Palladium-Item.

Full-power radio stations include WKBV, WFMG, WQLK, WKRT, and Earlham College's student-run public radio station WECI. Richmond is also served by WJYW which is repeated on 94.5 and 97.7. Area NPR radio stations include WBSH in Hagerstown, Indiana, and WMUB in Oxford, Ohio.

Richmond is considered to be within the Dayton, Ohio, television market and has one full-power television station, WKOI, which is an Ion owned and operated station. The city also has one county-wide public, educational, and government access (PEG) cable television station, Whitewater Community Television. Richmond's Xfinity system supplements the area with Indianapolis stations.

== Transportation ==
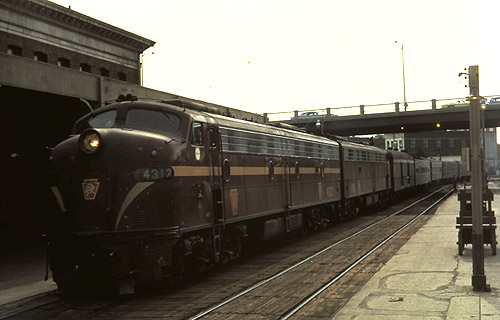
A Penn Central passenger train at Richmond's Pennsylvania Railroad station in 1968

Richmond Municipal Airport is a public-use airport five nautical miles (6 mi, 9 km) southeast of Richmond's central business district. It is owned by the Richmond Board of Aviation Commissioners. It is also an exclave of Richmond. Richmond's closest airport with commercial service is Dayton International Airport.

Richmond is served by Interstate 70 at exits 149, 151, 153, and 156.

Established in 1902, Richmond's Pennsylvania Railroad station was a hub for Pennsylvania Railroad, and later, Penn Central trains into the late 1960s. The last train at the station was Amtrak's National Limited between Kansas City and New York City, which ended service in 1979. Richmond was also home to a Chesapeake and Ohio Railway station.

Public transit service is provided by city-owned Roseview Transit, operating daily except Sundays and major holidays.

== Notable people ==
=== Academia ===
- J. Gayle Beck, clinical psychologist, Lillian and Morrie Moss Chair of Excellence and Professor at the University of Memphis
- Landrum Bolling, president of Earlham College, humanitarian, diplomat
- Mary Haas (1910–1996), linguist and professor at University of California-Berkeley
- Ella Bond Johnston (1860–1951) art administrator and educator.
- Wendell Stanley, biochemist, virologist, Nobel Prize winner

=== Actors ===
- Timothy Brown, professional football player, television/film actor and recording-artist
- Norman Foster, actor, director
- Sarah Purcell, actress
- Elizabeth Reller, old-time radio actress

=== Artists and designers ===
- George Herbert Baker, Impressionist painter
- John Elwood Bundy, Impressionist painter
- Charles Fremont Conner, Impressionist painter
- Maude Kaufman Eggemeyer, Impressionist painter
- Marcus Mote, painter
- Carole Wantz, folk artist
- Gaar Williams, cartoonist

=== Business ===
- Sarah Iliff Davis, early charity worker
- Micajah C. Henley, businessman, roller skate pioneer
- Charles Francis Jenkins, pioneer of early cinema and one of the inventors of television
- Addison H. Nordyke, industrialist and co-founder of Nordyke Marmon & Company.
- Daniel G. Reid, industrialist, financier, and philanthropist
- Burton J. Westcott, businessman, automobile manufacturer of Westcott Motor Car Company

=== Musicians ===
- May Aufderheide, ragtime composer
- Luvena Wallace Dethridge, soprano
- George Duning, musician and composer
- Harry "Singin' Sam" Frankel, radio star, minstrel
- Baby Huey, rock and soul vocalist
- Jeff Hamilton, jazz drummer
- Harold Jones, has performed with many notables, including Tony Bennett and Count Basie
- Melvyn "Deacon" Jones, blues organist
- Rich Mullins, singer/musician
- Sondra Radvanovsky, opera singer
- Ned Rorem, composer and Putlizer Prize winner
- The Will-O-Bees, pop music trio in the 1960s

=== Politicians, activists, and civic leaders ===
- Bill W. Balthis (1939–2016), Illinois state representative and businessman
- Thomas W. Bennett, Richmond mayor, Governor, congressional delegate of Idaho territory.
- John A. Bridgland (1826–1890), diplomat, businessman and soldier; colonel in the Union Army
- Levi Coffin, underground railroad organizer, and director of a local Richmond bank
- David W. Dennis, U.S. Congressman
- Jehu Elliott, Justice of the Indiana Supreme Court
- Gregory Lee Johnson (born 1956), American political activist.
- John F. Kibbey, Indiana Attorney General
- Ida Finney Mackrille (1867–1960) suffragist and a women's political leader in the State of California.
- Dan Mitrione, Richmond police chief from 1956 to 1960, and U.S. adviser who trained police in the use of torture in Uruguay.
- Oliver P. Morton, Indiana's Civil War governor
- Susan Porter Rose, Chief of Staff to the First Lady of the United States (1989–1993)

=== Religion and related ===
- John Wilbur Chapman, Presbyterian evangelist
- Jim Jones, founder-leader of Peoples Temple
- William Paul Quinn, an African Methodist Episcopal Bishop
- D. Elton Trueblood, Quaker theologian

=== Science ===
- Charles A. Hufnagel, M.D. artificial heart valve inventor
- Wright brothers, aviation pioneers

=== Sports ===
- Desmond Bane, NBA, Selected 30th overall by the Memphis Grizzlies in the 2020 NBA draft
- Claude Berry, MLB catcher
- Weeb Ewbank, coach of 1958 and 1959 NFL champion Baltimore Colts and the Super Bowl III champion New York Jets
- Vagas Ferguson, NFL running back
- Paul Flatley, NFL wide receiver (Minnesota Vikings)
- Del Harris, professional basketball coach
- Bob Jenkins, Motorsports announcer
- Daniel Kinsey, hurdler, Olympic gold medalist
- Jim Logan
- Lamar Lundy, football player, one of the L.A. Rams' "Fearsome Foursome"
- Bo Van Pelt, professional golfer

=== Writers and journalists ===
- Christopher Benfey, literary critic
- Mae Bramhall, actress, writer
- William Dudley Foulke, lawyer, author

== Sister cities ==
- Serpukhov, Russia
- Unnan, Shimane Prefecture, Japan

== See also ==
- Swayne, Robinson and Company
- Richmond, Indiana facility fire
- Richmond Mall
