= Teackle T. Wescott =

American state legislator in Virginia

Teackle Turner Wescott was an American soldier, school superintendent and state legislator in Virginia. He represented Accomack County in the Virginia House of Delegates from 1883 to 1887.

Wescott was a Lieutenant in the Accomack regiment of the Confederate States Army. He lived in Grangerville. He married and had two daughters.

Wescott was the maternal grandfather of John Teackle Holland.
