= Westcott, Missouri =

Extinct town in the American state of Missouri

Coordinates: 37°58′19″N 91°53′55″W

Westcott is an extinct town in northwestern Phelps County, in the U.S. state of Missouri. The community lies on Missouri Route C approximately three quarters of a mile east of Tick Creek and three miles north-northwest of Doolittle and I-44.

== History ==
A post office called Westcott was established in 1893, and remained in operation until 1906. It is unknown why the name Westcott was applied to this community.
