= Roseview Transit =

Provider of mass transportation in Wayne County, Indiana

- Headquarters: 401 S Q St
- Locale: Richmond, Indiana
- Service area: Wayne County, Indiana
- Service type: Bus service, paratransit
- Routes: 6
- Hubs: Municipal Parking Garage
- Fleet: 6 buses
- Annual ridership: 197,998 (2019)
- Website: Roseview Transit

Roseview Transit is the primary provider of mass transportation in Richmond, Indiana, with six routes serving the region. As of 2019, the system provided 197,998 rides over 24,079 annual vehicle revenue hours with six buses and three paratransit vehicles.

== History ==
Public transit in Richmond began with horsecars in 1873, with the Richmond City Railway Co. In 1889, the horsecars were replaced with streetcars, which in turn were replaced by buses in 1938. In early 2022, buses were installed with translation devices, in order to better accommodate riders for whom English is not their primary language. Later that year, a driver shortage forced the agency to reduce weekday operating hours temporarily. At the time, Saturday service continued from 9:00 A.M. to 5:00 P.M., however, as of September 2023, Saturday service has been eliminated, while weekday service has returned to normal.

== Service ==
Roseview Transit operates six regular weekday bus routes on a pulse system with five routes serving the Municipal Parking Garage at 15 past the hour and four routes departing there at 45 past the hour.

Hours of operation for the system are Monday through Friday from 6:15 A.M. to 5:45 P.M. There is no service on Saturdays and Sundays. Regular fares are $1.75.

=== Routes ===
- Route 1 (Fairview Bus/East Main Street Bus)
- Route 2 (East Main Street Bus/South 13th, 5th and Q Street Bus)
- Route 3 (Reid Hospital/IUEast/Ivy Tech Bus)
- Route 4 (South 8th and Country Club Bus/National Road/West Richmond Bus)
- Route 5 (State Hospital/Earlham Bus/North 8th/Glenn Miller Bus)
- Route 6 (East Main Shuttle Route)

== Fixed route ridership ==
The ridership statistics shown here are of fixed route services only and do not include demand response services.

== See also ==
- List of bus transit systems in the United States
- Richmond Railroad Station Historic District
