= Davis (automobile) =

Defunct American motor vehicle manufacturer

The Davis was an American cyclecar manufactured in Detroit, Michigan, by the Davis Cyclecar Company in 1914. The car used a two-cylinder Spacke air-cooled engine, and featured three-speed selective transmission and a double chain drive on a 93-inch wheelbase. The Davis was similar to the French Bédélia in that the driver sat in the rear seat. The tandem two-seater cost $425, but designer William Norris Davis was unable to secure the capital to undertake production. He moved to the West Coast and joined the Los Angeles Cyclecar Company.
