= Westcott (automobile) =

American manufacturer (1909–1925)

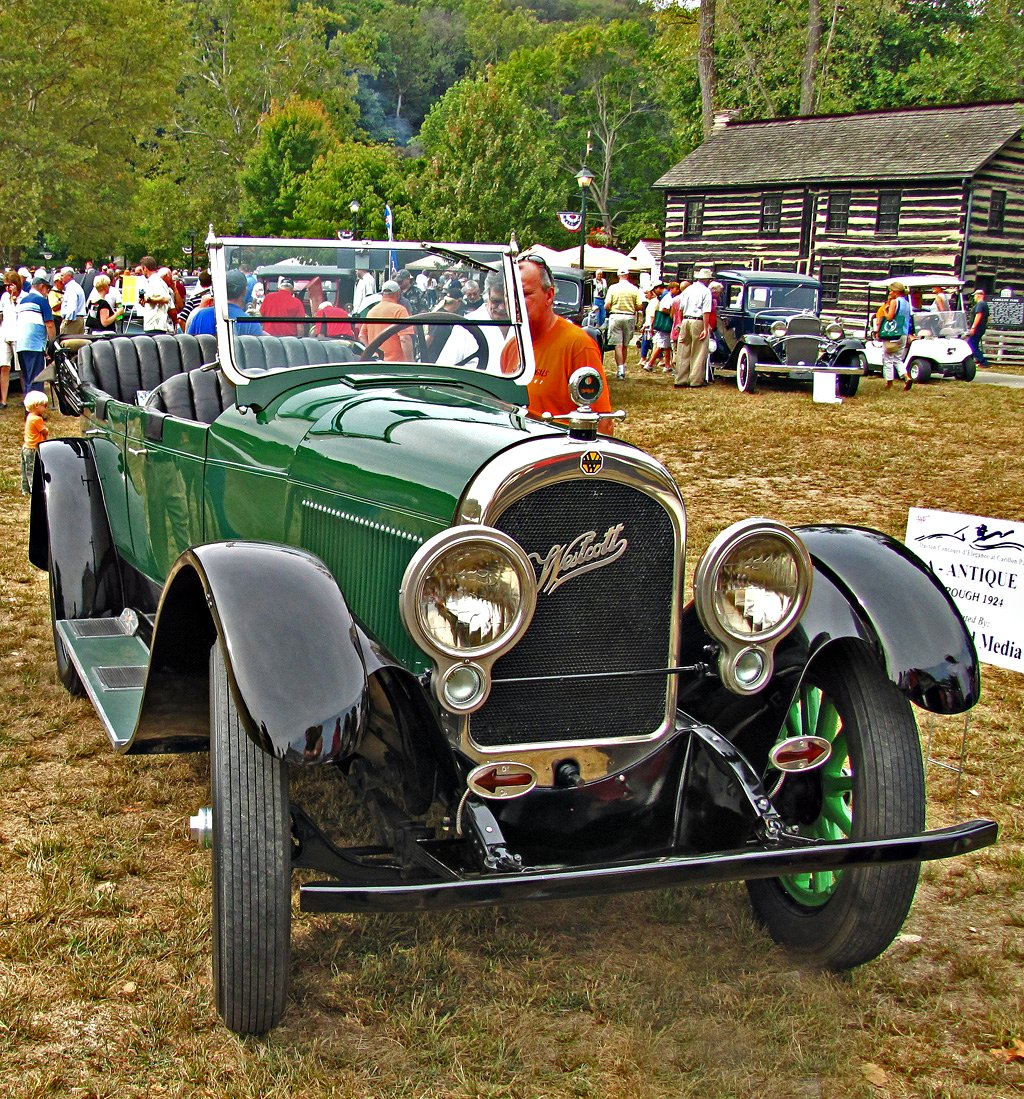
1920 Westcott

The Westcott was an automobile produced in Richmond, Indiana, and Springfield, Ohio, in the United States between 1909 and 1925 by the Westcott Motor Car Company. The car company was named for its founder, John Westcott.

== Westcott Motor Car Company ==
The company originated from John Westcott's Westcott Carriage Company which was founded in Richmond, Indiana in 1896. It was reorganized as the Westcott Motor Car Company in 1909. John Westcott sold his interest to Burton J. Westcott in 1916 and production moved to Springfield. In 1917 output reached 2,000 cars with it peaking in 1920.

The last known advertisement for Westcott cars was April 5, 1925 and the same day a newspaper reported that the company had been sold the previous day to J. B. Cartmell, Arthur Hill, and George Cugley for $81,000. Production had stopped as the company was unable to pay debts of $825,000 owed to suppliers of parts used in the cars. Burton Westcott had been unable to save the company and died a year later in January 1926. Westcotts were hand built and the company had not adapted to the cost saving production line techniques being used by other manufacturers.

Burton Westcott was known as a client of architect Frank Lloyd Wright, who designed a Prairie School style house for the Westcott Family in Springfield, Ohio in 1904. Restoration of the Westcott House began in 2004.

== Westcott motor cars ==
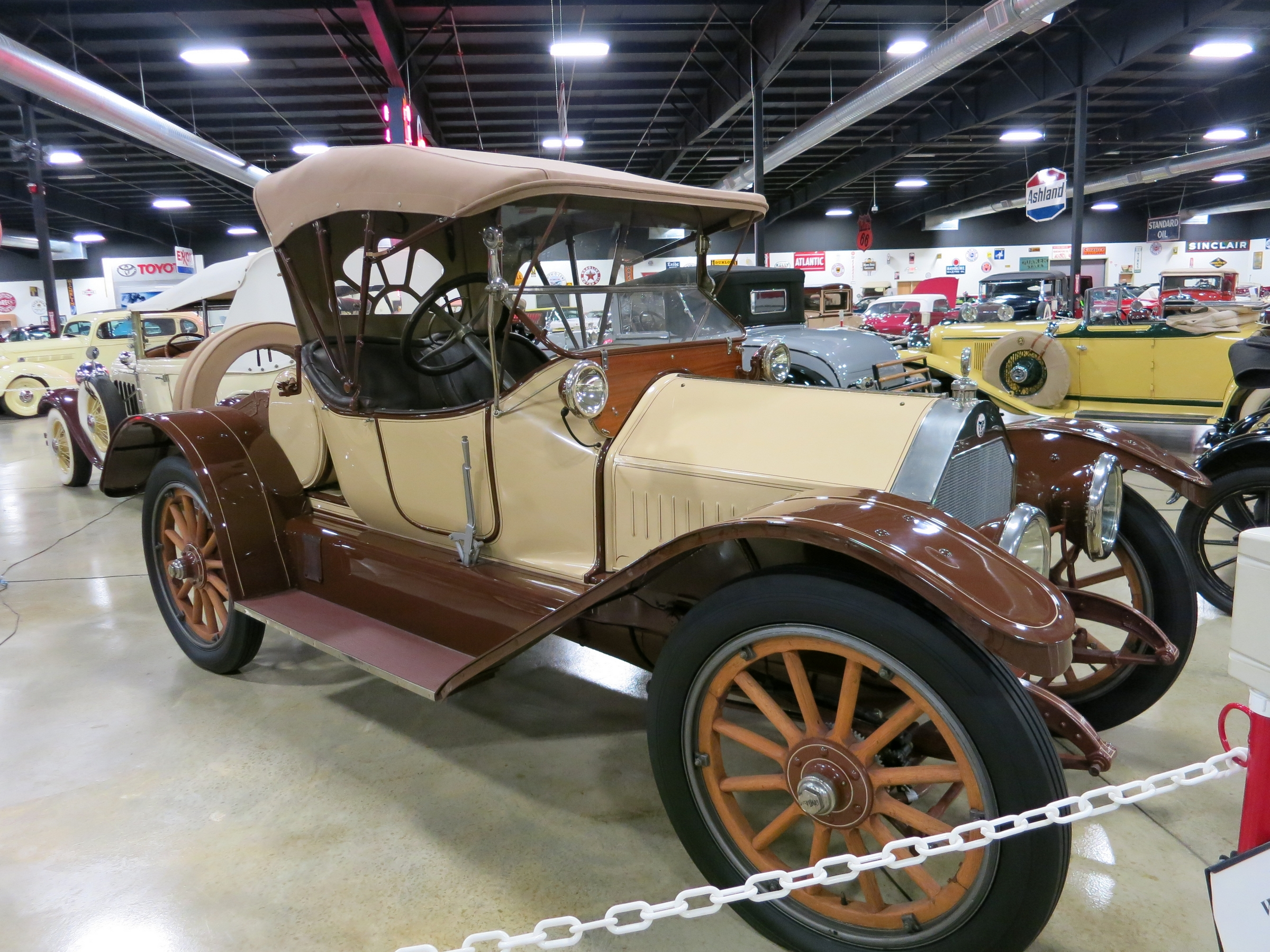
1914 Westcott Roadster

The Westcott was advertised as "the car with the longer life". Westcotts were powered by Continental engines, and rode at least two wheelbases, 125 in (3,175 mm) and 118 in (2,997 mm). In 1923, the company released a model named the Closure, which was a touring car with hard panels that could be removed from the sides of the car during the summer months. According to the company, the average lifespan of a Westcott car was 10 years, which was three and a half years higher than the national average.

=== Models ===
- 1909 14 hp water-cooled engine buggy that rode on 38 inch solid rubber tires
- 1913 coupe
- 1914 Model 4-48 four-cylinder engine 48 hp five-passenger touring car, four-passenger touring car, two-passenger roadster all costing $1,985
- 1914 Model 6-50 six-cylinder engine 67 hp seven-passenger touring car $2,535, five-passenger touring car $2,485, two-passenger roadster $2,485
- 1916 Model 42
- 1917 Popular
- 1917 roadster four-seat
- 1919 A-48
- 1920 Lighter six - 118 inch wheelbase - two-seat roadster, three-seat coupe, five-passenger touring car, and a five-passenger sedan
- 1920 Larger six - 125 inch wheelbase a five- or seven-seat touring car, and a seven-seat limousine
- 1923 five-passenger standard touring, sport touring, and sedan priced from $1,690 to $2,690
- 1923 seven-passenger standard touring, sedan, and limousine priced from $1,890 to $3,090

== Overview of production figures ==
| Year | Production | Model | Engine displacement | HP |
|---|---|---|---|---|
| 1909 | | Motor Buggy | | |
| 1910 | | F | | |
| 1911 | | S | | |
| | | R | | |
| | | U | | |
| 1912 | | K | | |
| | | L | | |
| | | M | | |
| | | R | | |
| 1913 | | 4-40 | | |
| | | 6-50 | | |
| 1914 | | 4-40 | | |
| | | 6-50 | | |
| | 83 | O-30 | | 19.6 |
| 1915 | 245 | O-35 | | 19.6 |
| | | U | | |
| 1916 | 198 | 41 | | 25.35 |
| | 399 | 42 | | 25.35 |
| | 401 | 51 | | 29.4 |
| 1917 | 789 | 17 | | 29.4 |
| 1918 | 908 | 18 | | 29.4 |
| 1919 | 800 | B 38 | | 25.35 |
| | 903 | A 48 | | 29.4 |
| 1920 | | C 38 | | 25.35 |
| | | C 48 | | 29.4 |
| 1921 | | C 38 | | 25.35 |
| | | C 48 | | 29.4 |
| 1922 | | C 38 | | 25.35 |
| | | A 44 | | 27.34 |
| | 150 | C 48 | | 29.4 |
| | 1999 | D 48 | | 29.4 |
| 1923 | 700 | B 44 | | 27.34 |
| | 50 | D 48 | | 29.4 |
| 1924 | | C 44 | | 27.34 |
| | 220 | 60 | | 25.35 |
| | | D 48 | | 29.4 |
| 1925 | | C 44 | | 27.34 |
| | | D 48 | | 29.4 |
| | | 60 | | 27.34 |
| Sum · · | | | | |

== Motor racing ==
Westcotts competed in the Glidden Tour of 1910 from Cincinnati to Chicago via Dallas and the first Indy 500 of 1911. The Westcott, driven by Harry Knight was running in third place in the Indy race when on lap 90 it crashed while avoiding a mechanic who had fallen from Joe Jagersberger's car. Knight's mechanic was injured in the crash.
