= The Painters' Club of Los Angeles =

Defunct male-only arts organization

The Painters' Club of Los Angeles was a short-lived arts organization that existed from 1906 to 1909, and allowed only men as members. When the group disbanded a number of artists who had been members reorganized themselves as the California Art Club, including Charles Percy Austin (1883–1948), Franz Bischoff (1864–1929), Carl Oscar Borg (1879–1947), Benjamin Brown (1865–1942), Hanson Puthuff (1875–1972), Jack Wilkinson Smith (1873–1949), and William Wendt (1845–1946). Beginning with its founding in December 1909, the new California Art Club widened its membership guidelines to include female painters and sculptors of any gender.

== Before The Painters' Club ==
Four artists in Indiana, Albert Clinton Conner (1848–1929), his brother Charles Fremont Conner (1857–1905), Frank J. Girardin (1856–1945), and Micajah Thomas Nordyke (1847–1919) were responsible for founding the Rambler's Sketch Club (c. 1881); they soon added John Elwood Bundy (1853–1933) to their small art group. The Rambler's Sketch Club became the Richmond Art Association (founded 1898), which eventually became the Richmond Art Museum. One of these artists, Albert Clinton Conner, moved to California sometime around 1902 and settled in Manhattan Beach.

== Founding ==
On March 10, 1906, several Los Angeles area painters got together with the idea of forming a club. Many of them had met each other casually at exhibition openings, but they wanted to create a more formal association. A week later, on March 17, eleven of the group, including Albert Clinton Conner met at the Los Angeles studio of artist William Swift Daniell (1865–1933), where The Painters' Club of Los Angeles was officially created. The intended mission of the club was "to meet in the spirit of comradeship and good temper for mutual criticism and suggestion on one another's recent work." Albert Clinton Conner was elected President and Antony Anderson, the Los Angeles Times' first art critic, was chosen to be the first Secretary and Treasurer. Membership was limited to male painters; no women were allowed to join, nor were sculptors of either gender. "It may be that women painters will be admitted later on, but at present they are not eligible."

The eleven founding members of The Painters' Club of Los Angeles present that evening include: Antony E. Anderson (1863–1939), Carl Oscar Borg (1879–1947), William Henry Cole (1870–1955), Albert Clinton Conner (1848–1929), Frank C. Conner, David H. Dunn, William Swift Daniell (1865–1933), Frank Elwin Evans, Frank Rensselear Liddell (1864–1923), Hanson Puthuff (1875–1972), and George Thomas Winterburn (1865–1953).

== Meetings ==
Club meetings were held in various member's studios or at art organizations around Los Angeles, often at the Art Students' League. Members brought their sketches and paintings to be discussed at each meeting: "So far, nobody's feelings have been hurt, though all have been criticised unmercifully. The work brought in each week shows splendid results from this raking fire of criticism."

== Exhibitions ==
Soon after its formation, The Painters' Club was given a small gallery in the art store of Ford, Smith, & Little Co., located at No. 313 Broadway, Los Angeles, for its exclusive use in presenting exhibitions. "Members' pictures will hang there...to see and to buy...there will be no dearth of new pictures from the facile brushes of our own home painters. Drawings in black and white will also be shown, and everything, it is promised, will be of the best."

The Club presented four or five exhibitions at Ford Smith & Little's, starting in December 1906 and continuing with new exhibitions monthly through January, February, March, and April 1907.

- Ford Smith & Little's, Dec. 1–31, 1906
- Ford Smith & Little's, Jan. 1-31, 1907
- Ford Smith & Little's, Feb. 1-28, 1907
- Ford Smith & Little's, March 1–31, 1907 (Not known if this was a separate exhibit or a continuation of the February exhibit)
- Ford Smith & Little's, April 1–30, 1907

The Club later held two large annual exhibitions at the Blanchard Art Gallery in Los Angeles. The First Annual Exhibition was held October 7 – 22, 1908 and showcased eighty-eight pieces of artwork.

The Second Annual Exhibition was held November 1 – 13, 1909. It included "...almost 100 pictures in oil and watercolor, the work of 20 painters." The work included was not juried, as members could choose what work they wanted to exhibit.

== Membership ==
During the course of its three-year existence, The Painters' Club of Los Angeles had around 53 members. A number of them went on to become major artists in California Impressionism as well as significant members of the California Art Club, including its first three Presidents. A membership card was designed by Martin Jacob Jackson. Some of the more prominent members are listed below.

- AUSTIN, Charles Percy (1883–1948), Active Member
- BISCHOFF, Franz (1864–1929), Active Member
- BORG, Carl Oscar (1879–1947), Charter Member
- BROWN, Benjamin Chambers (1865–1942), Active Member
- CONNER, Albert Clinton ("Pops") (1848–1929), Charter Member
- DANIELL, William Swift (1865–1933), Charter Member
- JACKSON, Martin Jacob (1871–1955), Active Member
- KILPATRICK, Aaron Edward (1872–1953), Active Member
- LIDDELL, Frank Rennsselear (1864–1923), Charter Member
- PUTHUFF, Hanson Duvall (1875–1972), Charter Member
- SMITH, Jack W. (1873–1949), Active Member
- WENDT, William (1845–1946), Active Member

Membership Source:

== Disbanding ==
In December 1909 the Los Angeles Times announced that The Painters' Club was disbanding; in the next paragraph a new organization is announced: "...to be called the California Art Club."

Despite this seemingly sudden breakup, which happened soon after their second Annual Exhibition, there might be some clues. On at least two instances - August 24 and December 12, 1908 - members of the male-only Painters' Club visited the studios of William Wendt and Julia Bracken Wendt. William Wendt had been elected as a member just weeks before their visit on August 4, 1908, but due to club rules regarding women artists, Julia Wendt was never a member, despite the fact that she was a successful sculptor who was exhibiting and working on commissions on a national level. During their first visit the men viewed new paintings by Mr. Wendt and "recent bits of modeling" by Mrs. Wendt, before members of the club were treated to lunch. On the second occasion, the club threw the Wendts a surprise party.

Tucked in with the announcements of the ending of one art club and the start of another, Antony Anderson casually dropped a snide comment about the new club's decision to allow women artists to join, as if to say we may as well allow them to join because they would find a way to get in anyway. Two swift responses to it were printed as Open Letters in the Times: the first by J. B. Wendt in January 1910 and the second by one L. Pinkham, February 1910.

Along with these rebukes, another successful female artist was exhibiting at Blanchard Art Gallery, though not of course with The Painters' Club. Helma Heynsen Jahn (1874–1925), later a member of the California Art Club, participated in another exhibition that followed just on the heels of the Second Annual Exhibition. Referred to only as "...the second annual exhibition of works by representational oil painters of Southern California...," it ran from November 16 – December 4, 1909, and though "...only 15 painters in oils have contributed to this exhibition...", that included work by major artists Franz Bischoff, Carl Oscar Borg, Hanson Puthuff, and William Wendt. Perhaps The Painters' Club felt it would ultimately be better to allow women to join and unify the strongest artists, regardless of gender, into one group.
