= Maude Kaufman Eggemeyer =

American artist (1877–1959)

- Born: December 9, 1877; New Castle, Indiana
- Died: December 1, 1959 (aged 81); Asheville, North Carolina
- Spouse: Elmer Eggemeyer

Maude Kaufman Eggemeyer (December 9, 1877 – December 1, 1959) was an early 20th Century painter associated with the Richmond Group of artists in Richmond, Indiana.

== Early life and education ==
She was born in New Castle, Indiana in 1877. Eggemeyer is the daughter of architect William S. Kaufman. She studied first studied architectural drawing under her father's instruction for three years. Eggemeyer also studied under John Elwood Bundy while attending Earlham College. At the Art Academy of Cincinnati, where she received the first scholarship awarded to a woman, she studied under Frank Duveneck and Lewis Henry Meakin. Then at the Overbeck School of Pottery, she studied with the Overbeck Sisters in Cambridge City, Indiana. She also studied with J. Ottis Adams at the Hermitage in Brookville, Indiana.

== Career ==
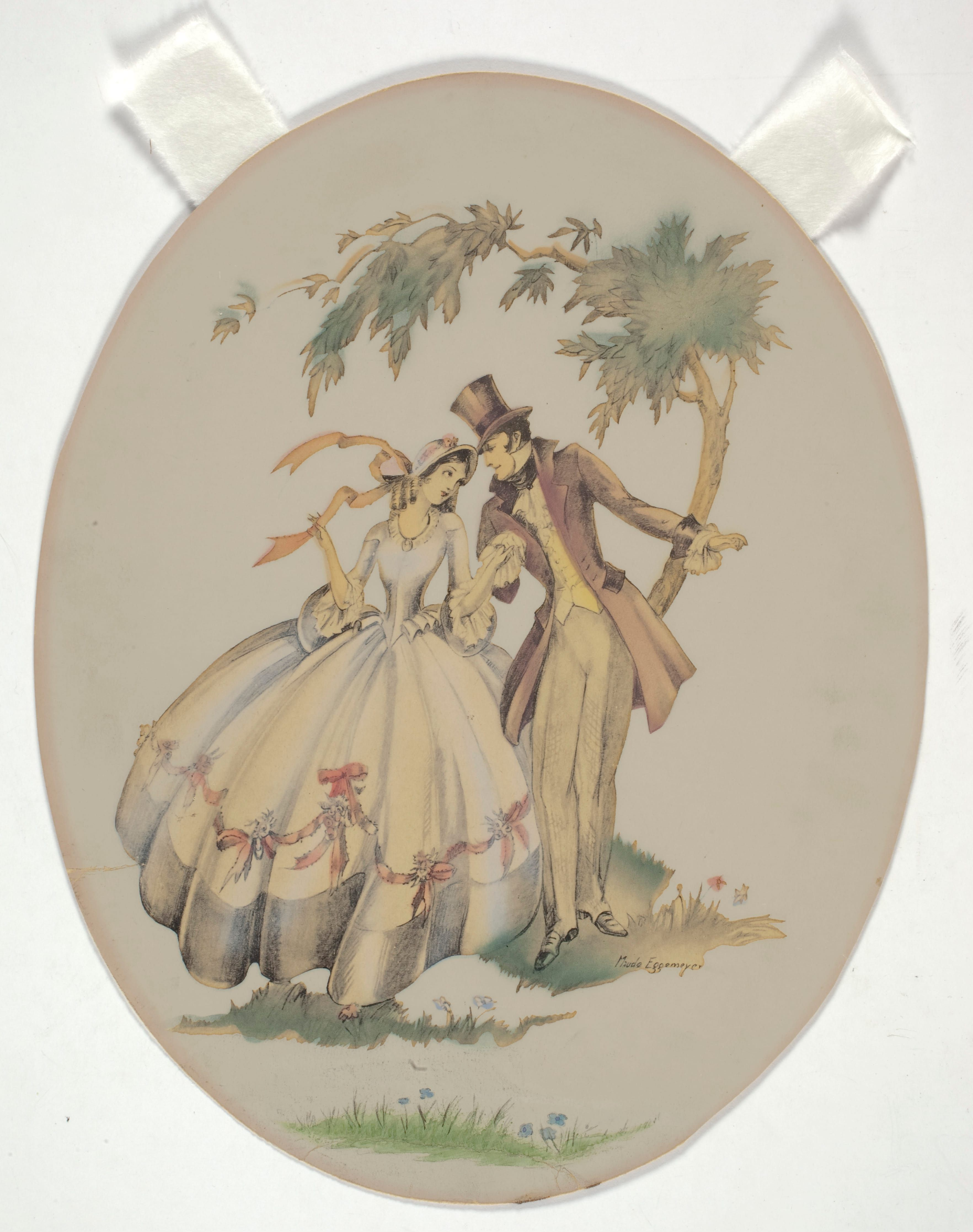
Hand-colored lithograph by Maude Eggemeyer of a couple in mid-nineteenth century dress.

Eggemeyer was a versatile painter and is best known for her oil paintings of backyard gardens, landscapes, and still life scenes, though she also equally adept at portraiture. She was also known to travel to paint the gardens of well-known families in the neighboring state of Ohio. Eggemeyer exhibited her works at the Richmond Art Association every year from 1906 through 1924, and in 1910 and 1914, she was awarded the coveted Richmond Prize.

She married Elmer Eggemeyer the postmaster of Richmond, Indiana and painted in the studio of their home at South 18th and A Streets in Richmond which she helped her father design. She also painted in Provincetown, Massachusetts, where the Eggemeyers had a summer home. Elmer killed himself in 1931 and she stopped painting about that time. She died in 1959 in Asheville, North Carolina, at the home of her sister where she had gone to live.

Today her paintings are held in a number of private collections and museums, including the Haan Mansion Museum of Indiana Art, Richmond Art Museum, Indiana State Museum and the Louise and Alan Sellars Collection of Art by American Women in Indianapolis. She is buried in the Kaufman family plot at Earlham Cemetery in Richmond, Indiana.
