= Albert Clinton Conner =

American painter

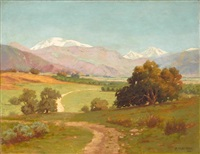
Snowcapped mountains near Pasadena

Albert Clinton Conner (September 5, 1848 – April 13, 1929) was an American Impressionist painter who was an integral part of the Richmond Group of painters in the late 19th and early 20th centuries. After moving to California, Conner helped found The Painters' Club of Los Angeles in 1906, which lay the groundwork for the creation of the California Art Club three years later in 1909.

== Early years ==
Albert Clinton Conner was born in Fountain City, Indiana on September 5, 1848. He was a self-taught painter who spent most of his career in Indiana. Albert Conner and his brother Charles Conner (1857-1905) founded the Rambler's Sketch Club (c.1881) along with Frank J. Girardin (1856-1945) and Micajah Thomas Nordyke (1847-1919), and soon added John Elwood Bundy (1853–1933) to their group. The Rambler's Sketch Club later metamorphosed into the Richmond Art Association (founded 1898, but had exhibited art in schools as early as 1896), which subsequently became the Richmond Art Museum.

Albert Conner moved to the Los Angeles area in October 1887 and became involved in the local art scene, exhibiting in local galleries. His address is listed as 232 South Griffin Avenue in Los Angeles, CA. In circa 1909 he moved his family to Manhattan Beach, CA with his residence recorded as 609 13th St, Manhattan Beach, CA.

== The Painters' Club of Los Angeles ==
On the evening of March 17, 1906, eleven artists met at the studio of William Swift Daniell (1865-1933) with the intention of forming an art club; that night The Painters' Club of Los Angeles was born. Albert Clinton "Pops" Conner was elected President of the new art club, and Antony Anderson, the first art critic for the Los Angeles Times, was selected to be the first Secretary and Treasurer. No women or sculptors were allowed, as the group was limited to male painters. "...the Painters’ Club has been formed...The president of the club is A.C. Conner."

The Painters' Club of Los Angeles soon acquired a club gallery at Ford Smith & Little’s, No. 313 Broadway, and began to present one to two-month-long exhibits of members' work. (See Exhibitions below for a complete listing of Albert Conner's work exhibited at Ford Smith & Little's.)

After a break over the summer of 1907, The Painters’ Club held its first meeting of the year on November 20, 1907 at the home studio of Albert Clinton Conner on S. Griffin Ave. On November 26, 1907, Albert Conner is re-elected President of the club.

The Painters' Club held two larger annual exhibitions; Conner participated in both of them, held at the Blanchard Art Gallery. The First Annual Exhibition was held in late 1908; after that, on December 1, 1908, Conner is unanimously re-elected president. The Second Annual Exhibition was held in late 1909. (For full details see Exhibitions below.) Soon after this, The Painters' Club is disbanded.

== The California Art Club ==
The California Art Club (CAC) was created almost in the same moment that The Painters' Club ended in December 1909. At this point, "Pops" Conner was in his 60s, but he continued to exhibit with the new group, including venues like the Long Beach Public Library Art Gallery (1910), an exhibit at the new Royar and Neighbours Gallery (1912), a CAC Exhibition of Sketches (1912), a CAC Spring Exhibition (1912),

Conner also participated in the four initial Annual CAC Exhibitions; the first two were held in 1911. The Second Annual exhibition pamphlet lists Conner under a small category of exhibiting Honorary Members along with a handful of other members of The Painters' Club; elsewhere in the same pamphlet Conner is also listed as Honorary President. Both the Third (1912) and Fourth (1913) Annual Exhibitions were first exhibited in Los Angeles and then traveled for a second showing to The San Francisco Institute of Art

Conner often painted the coast near Manhattan Beach where he lived. In 1912, he was elected city treasurer of the newly incorporated town. Conner died in Manhattan Beach on April 13, 1929.

== Memberships ==
- The Painters' Club of Los Angeles (President - first and only)
- California Art Club

== Exhibitions ==
- Ruskin Art Club (Los Angeles), 1905
- Ford Smith & Little's, Dec. 1–31, 1906 (Painters' Club exhibit); Conner exhibited "The Oaks […] A Gray Day."
- Ford Smith & Little's, Jan. 1-31, 1907 (Painters' Club exhibit); Conner exhibited "A Mountain Stream" and "Foggy Morning."
- Ford Smith & Little's, Feb. 1-28, 1907 (Painters' Club exhibit); Conner exhibited "The Rustic Bridge" and "Oak-strewn Mountain Side."
- Ford Smith & Little's, April 1–30, 1907 (Painters' Club exhibit); Conner exhibited "Lake Elsinore" and "Study of Oaks."
- The First Annual Exhibition of The Painters' Club, Blanchard Art Gallery, Los Angeles, Oct. 7 – 22, 1908. Conner exhibited two works, "Midwinter in the San Gabriel Valley" and "Across the Channel," the latter a marine painting.
- The Second Annual Exhibition of The Painters' Club, Blanchard Art Gallery, Los Angeles, Nov. 1-13, 1909. Conner exhibited two oil paintings, "The Mesa Meadow" and "Along the Beach."
- 1st Annual Exhibit of the Chautauqua Association of Southern California, July 16 – Sept. 15, 1910, Long Beach Public Library Art Gallery, 101 Pacific Avenue, Long Beach, CA. Conner's work is unnamed.
- First Annual CAC Exhibition, Jan. 31 – Feb. 25, 1911, California Art Club Gallery and Club-Room, 10th and Figueroa Streets, Hotel Ivins, Los Angeles. Conner exhibited two oil paintings, "Sunshine and Mist" and "Manhattan Beach."
- Royar and Neighbours Gallery, Feb. 5 – 25, 1912, No. 744 Hill Street, Los Angeles. Conner exhibited two unnamed oil paintings at the new gallery.
- Exhibition of Sketches, March 21 – 30, 1912, Blanchard Gallery, Los Angeles. Conner's work is unnamed.
- Second Annual CAC Exhibition, Nov. 22 – Dec. 6, 1911, Blanchard Gallery, Los Angeles. Conner exhibited two paintings, "An Arroyo Memory" and "Where the Lupines Grow." He is listed in the exhibition pamphlet under a special category of Honorary Members along with a handful of other members of The Painters' Club; elsewhere in the same pamphlet Conner is also listed as Honorary President.
- CAC Spring Exhibition, May 3 – 31, 1912, Friday Morning Club, Los Angeles. Conner exhibited "A Shady Pool."
- Third Annual CAC Exhibition, Nov. 18 – Dec. 30, 1912, Blanchard Hall Gallery, Los Angeles. Conner exhibited "A Shady Pool." The Third Annual Exhibition traveled for a second showing to The San Francisco Institute of Art, Dec. 8, 1912 – Jan. 2, 1913.
- Fourth Annual CAC Exhibition, October 20 – November 8, 1913, Blanchard Hall Gallery, Los Angeles. Conner exhibited "Lupines." The Fourth Annual Exhibition traveled for a second showing to The San Francisco Institute of Art December 8–20, 1913.
- San Francisco Art Association, 1911–13
- Gardena (CA) High School, 1933

== Collections ==
- Manhattan Beach Historical Society
- Santa Fe Railway
