= Douglas David =

American painter

Douglas David (born July 9, 1957) is a fine art painter. He is an American impressionist, known for his landscapes, still lifes, and seascapes. As an Indiana artist who includes familiar Midwestern, New England and Southeastern scenes and subjects among his work, he is recognized for his loose, fluid style of painting. He is a resident of Indianapolis, Indiana.

David was born and grew up in Kokomo, Indiana. He graduated from Taylor High School, which in 2012 named David to the Taylor High School Hall of Fame as a Titan of Taylor. David graduated with honors from Indiana University's Herron School of Art and Design in 1979 with a Bachelor of Fine Arts. He joined the creative department of shopping mall developer Simon Property Group (previously known as Melvin Simon & Associates), working his way from a graphic designer, to art director, to creative director.

In 1988 he left Simon to open Douglas David Design, his own graphic design and advertising agency, working with clients in retail, real estate development and health care.

During the mid-1990s he began painting, studying the palette of Frank Vincent DuMond during the summers in Vermont with Frank Mason of the Art Students League of New York. In 1997 David began painting full-time, building his stature as an Indiana artist. His work follows in the tradition of other Indiana artists, including Richmond Group artist John Elwood Bundy, who used farm animals and Indiana landscapes and nature as their subjects.

David has had numerous one-man shows, including:

- Richmond Art Museum,
- Fort Wayne Museum of Art
- Palette & Chisel Academy of Fine Art
- Indianapolis Museum of Art’s In Indiana Gallery
- Captiva Community Center
- Indiana State Fair
- Indiana University/Kokomo
- Honeywell Center/Clark Gallery
- Mackinac Island Public Library
- Captiva Yacht Club
- Bok Tower Gardens

In 2001 one of his Indiana landscapes was chosen as the winner of the state’s license plate design contest and in 2006, Gov. Mitch Daniels selected 23 of David’s paintings for gifts on Daniels’ trade mission to Japan and South Korea. Daniels awarded David the Distinguished Hoosier Award in 2006. His work hangs in the Indiana Governor's Residence, and at the request of Karen Pence, wife of Vice President and former Indiana Governor Mike Pence, one of David's landscapes of an Indiana peony now hangs in the vice presidential residence.

David has also been an instructor, teaching at Herron School of Art, as well as various art centers across the United States, including:

- Marco Island Center for the Arts
- Bryan Memorial Gallery
- Art Association of Nantucket
- Old Town Art Center/Chicago
- Longboat Key Center for the Arts at the Ringling College of Art and Design
- Vero Beach Museum of Art
- Oliver Art Center
- Boca Grande Art Center
- Naples Art Association
- The Center for the Arts Bonita Springs
- Glen Arbor Art Association
- Rowayton Art Center
- Holland Arts Council
- Big Arts Sanibel Island
- Southern Vermont Art Center
- Richmond Art Museum
- The Studios of Key West
- Ocean Reef Art League

In addition, David works to increase awareness of art, including in Indianapolis. He painted Ebb and Flow, a public mural on the exterior of a downtown Indianapolis building as part of a program of the Arts Council of Indianapolis.
