= George Herbert Baker =

American painter

George Herbert Baker (February 14, 1878 – March 11, 1943) was an American Impressionist artist who worked primarily in the Richmond, Indiana area and was a member of the "Richmond Group" of painters. He worked in oil, watercolor and pastels. He worked for a time in Brown County, Indiana and is sometimes associated with that group of artists.

Born in Muncie, Indiana, Baker lived in Richmond and Centerville most of his life. He studied with John Elwood Bundy, at the Cincinnati Art Academy and the Boothbay Art School. In 1925 he was a visiting instructor at Miami University.

His work is represented in the collections of the Indianapolis Museum of Art, Haan Mansion Museum of Indiana Art, Richmond Art Museum, Earlham College, Miami University Art Museum, Morrisson-Reeves Library, Centerville, Indiana Library and a devoted group of private collectors. A painting titled "November Meadows" painted during the time he was an instructor at Miami University hangs today over the mantle in the formal living room of the Miami president's home, Lewis Place.

The Richmond Art Museum held a retrospective of his work in 2001 and was said to be the largest exhibition of his work ever mounted.
