= Ella Bond Johnston =

American art administrator and educator (1860–1951)

- Born: Ella Bond; November 19, 1860; Webster, Indiana
- Died: April 24, 1951 (aged 90); Richmond, Indiana

Ella Bond Johnston (November 19, 1860 – April 24, 1951) was an art administrator and educator. She is known for promotion of art and art appreciation into the education curriculum of Richmond, Indiana, at the end of the 19th century.

Johnston née Bond was born in Webster, Indiana on November 19, 1860. She studied at Earlham College and began a career as an educator in the Richmond Public School. She married Melville F. Johnston in 1889, with whom she had one child.

In 1898 Johnston co-founded the Richmond Art Association. Other founders included Strickland Gillilan and William Dudley Foulke. The association assembled a collection of art that was available to all in the community The collection included pieces from the Richmond Group art colony. Johnston served as president of the Richmond Art Association from 1899 through 1915.

In 1915 Johnston was appointed the senior docent in the art galleries of the Panama-Pacific International Exposition held in San Francisco. She also served as the chair of the art department of the General Federation of Women’s Clubs and the Indiana Federation of Art Clubs. Johnston was the author of The Art Movement in Richmond, Indiana: A History and an article in the October 1907 issue of the Journal of Education, "An Art Association for the People".

Johnston died on April 24, 1951, in Richmond, Indiana.
