= Micajah Thomas Nordyke =

Micajah Thomas Nordyke (March 9, 1847 – May 15, 1919) was a noted painter and member of the Richmond Group. Nordyke was a student of Frank Duveneck at the Cincinnati Academy of Art and a student at Earlham College, 1865–66. He also served as Richmond City Clerk.

Micajah Thomas Nordyke founded the Rambler's Sketch Club (c. 1881) along with three other painters, brothers Albert Clinton Conner (1848–1929) and Charles Fremont Conner (1857–1905), and Frank J. Girardin (1856–1945). John Elwood Bundy (1853–1933) soon joined their group. The Rambler's Sketch Club later became the Richmond Art Association (founded 1898, but had exhibited art in schools as early as 1896), which subsequently became the Richmond Art Museum.
