= Charles Conner =

Charles Conner may refer to:

- Charles Fremont Conner (1857–1905), American artist
- Charles Franklin Conner (born 1957), American lobbyist and former acting U.S. Secretary of Agriculture

== See also ==
- Charles Connors (disambiguation)
