= Ebb and Flow (mural) =

Mural by Douglas David in Indianapolis, Indiana

- Artist: Douglas David
- Year: 2006
- Type: Exterior house paint
- Location: Consolidated Building; Indianapolis, Indiana, United States

Ebb and Flow, is a 2006 public mural by American artist Douglas David, located on the exterior of the Consolidated Building in downtown Indianapolis, Indiana. It was painted by David using exterior house paint.

== Description ==
The mural, which is painted over five wood panels, covers windows of an un-used storefront. Ebb and Flow consists of primarily white, blue and green exterior house paints. The mural features the image of a cloud filled sky and green fields.

Signage sits to the bottom left of the mural featuring information about the work.

== Information ==
Douglas David painted Ebb and Flow at the location in 2006 as part of the Arts Council of Indianapolis' attempt to bring more public art to Indianapolis.

== Artist ==
Indiana artist Douglas David is known for his landscapes and still life paintings. David has a BFA in Visual Communication from Herron School of Art in 1979 and has studied under painters John P. Osborne and John C. Traynor. David has received numerous regional awards, most notably the Distinguished Hoosier Award presented by Indiana Governor Mitch Daniels. In 2003 he won the public vote for the Indiana state license plate, which remained in production through 2008.

In regards to his mural Ebb and Flow Douglas states: "As I paint simple subjects that remind us of the romance of everyday life, I have designed a very simple flowing landscape. It will focus on a breathtaking sky and a flowing pasture. I feel it is a wonderful depiction of the Midwest and captures the essence of Indiana and its natural beauty. As it will literally flow from panel to panel with the grace of the wind, I am naming it Ebb and Flow."

== Location history ==
Painted on location by the artist, Ebb and Flow is located in the heart of downtown Indianapolis on N. Pennsylvania St. An un-used storefront, the building provides an excellent canvas for passers-by in cars or on foot.
