= Lindley Hall =

Lindley Hall may refer to:

Places in the United Kingdom

- The former Lindley Hall in Leicestershire, England, later the site of RAF Lindley and now the proving ground of the Motor Industry Research Association
- Lindley Hall, London, one of the Royal Horticultural Halls

Places in the United States

- Lindley Hall at Ohio University, named for its first president, Jacob Lindley
- The former Lindley Hall at Earlham College in Richmond, Indiana, designed by William S. Kaufman
- The former Lindley Hall, first dormitory of the University of Idaho

== See also ==
- Lindley Hall Farm, one of the centre points of the United Kingdom
- Linley Hall at Linley, Shropshire
- Linley Hall at Talke, Staffordshire
