= Charles O'Connor =

Charles O'Connor may refer to:

- Charles O'Connor (politician) (1878–1940), American lawyer and politician
- Charles O'Connor (judge) (1854–1928), Irish judge, the last Master of the Rolls in Ireland
- Charles S. O'Connor (1879–1948), American politician
- C. Y. O'Connor (Charles Yelverton O'Connor, 1843–1902), Irish-born engineer of New Zealand and Australia
- Charles O'Connor (musician) (born 1948), English musician, member of the Irish group Horslips
- Charlie O'Connor (born 1946), Irish politician
- Charlie O'Connor (footballer) (1882–1936), Australian rules footballer

== See also ==
- Charles O'Conor (disambiguation)
- Charles Connor (disambiguation)
