= Cambridge City =

Cambridge City may refer to either of the following:

- Cambridge City, Indiana, a town in the United States
- Cambridge City F.C., an English football team
