= Marcus Mote =

American painter

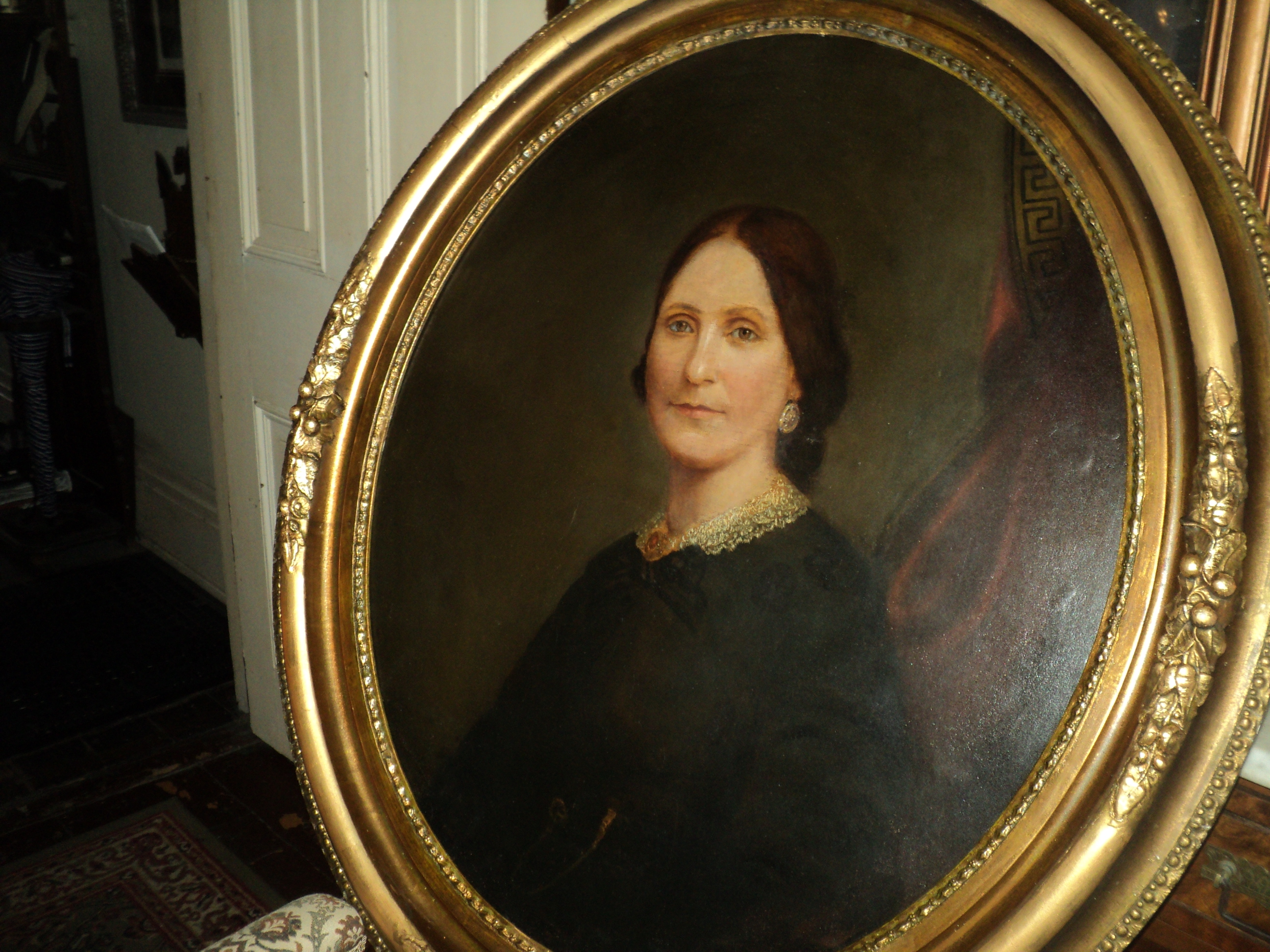
Oil portrait by Marcus Mote (1870)

Marcus Mote (1817 — February 26, 1898) was a Quaker artist who worked in Ohio and Indiana.

== Biography ==
Mote was born in West Milton, Ohio in 1817. In 1844 he moved to Lebanon, Ohio where he established a studio. He worked there as an itinerant artist. He opened a studio there, in 1864 he removed to Richmond, Indiana. He began teaching art to a few students in his Lebanon studio, which he expanded in Richmond. He called his new venture "Richmond Academy of Design," during his time in Richmond he campaigned for general art education. in public schools.

Mote's work includes landscapes, still lifes, religious paintings, portraits and photographs. He painted portraits of at least three governors, Jeremiah Morrow and Tom Corwin of Ohio and Oliver P. Morton of Indiana.

Marcus Mote died Feb. 26, 1898 and is buried in the Earlham Cemetery, Richmond, Wayne County, Indiana.

His works can be found in the collections of the Richmond Art Museum, Wayne County Historical Museum, Haan Mansion Museum of Indiana Art, Earlham College, the Warren County [Ohio] Historical Society, Glendower State Memorial and the Ohio Statehouse.
