= William S. Kaufman =

American architect

- Born: 1849; Union County, Indiana
- Died: 1916 (aged 66–67)
- Occupation: Architect
- Spouse: Eva Peed Kaufman
- Children: Maude Kaufman Eggemeyer; Thomas Kaufman
- Parent(s): Elias Kaufman; Mary Rhodes

William S. Kaufman (1849–1916) was an American architect known for designing a number of public buildings, primarily in Indiana and Ohio.

== Life and work ==
Kaufman was born in Union County, Indiana to Elias and Mary (Rhodes) Kaufman, who were Pennsylvania natives and early Indiana settlers. He attended school in Brownsville, Indiana and trained as a carpenter and stair-builder in Cambridge City, Indiana. He studied architectural drafting in Indianapolis and remained there until 1876, when he moved to New Castle and opened an office, later moving his practice to Richmond, Indiana. His son, Thomas, joined him in the architecture business for a time and then moved to Indianapolis and later to California with his wife, the noted Ragtime composer May Aufderheide Kaufman. A daughter, Maude Kaufman Eggemeyer became an accomplished artist of the Richmond Group of painters.

== Notable works ==
- Westmoreland County Courthouse, Greensburg, Pennsylvania
- The Westcott Hotel, Richmond, Indiana (demolished)
- Richmond State Hospital, Richmond, Indiana (superintendent of construction for architect E. H. Ketcham
- Lindley Hall at Earlham College (burned)
- Parry Hall at Earlham College
- Fayette County, Indiana Courthouse, Connersville, Indiana renovation
- Wayne County Courthouse (Indiana) (superintendent of construction for architect James McLaughlin
- Winchester, Indiana Friends Meeting House
- Wysor Street Depot, Muncie, Indiana
- Greenville Carnegie Library, Greenville, Ohio
- Central Christian Church, Lebanon, Indiana
- Henry Henley Public Library, Carthage, Indiana

== Sources ==
- Tomlan, Mary Raddant and Michael A. Richmond, Indiana: Its Physical and Aesthetic Heritage to 1920, Indianapolis: Indiana Historical Society, 2003
- Kieser, David L. "Carthage Historic District Study", Indianapolis: Kieser Consulting Group, LLC, 2015
