= Beulah Brown =

Beulah Brown may refer to:

- Beulah Brown (character), lead character of the radio and TV series Beulah
- Beulah H. Brown (1892–1987), Hoosier painter, educator, and textile designer
