= Charles Connors =

Charles or Chuck Conner, Conners, Connor, or Connors may refer to:

- Charles Connor (MP) (1840–1914), Irish member of parliament
- Charles Fremont Conner (1857–1905), American artist
- Chuck Connors (1921–1992), American TV actor and professional basketball and baseball player
- Charles Connor (1935–2021), American R&B drummer who worked with Little Richard
- Charles Connor (actor), Irish stage actor
- Charles Franklin Conner (born 1957), American lobbyist, U.S. deputy secretary of agriculture, acting secretary of agriculture
- Stompin' Tom Connors (Charles Thomas Connors, 1936–2013), Canadian country and folk musician
- Charles Raymond Connors, American jazz trombonist, member of Duke Ellington's orchestra
- George Washington "Chuck" Connors, American Tammany Hall politician

== See also ==
- Charles O'Conor (disambiguation)
- Charles O'Connor (disambiguation)
