= Charles O'Conor =

Charles O'Conor may refer to:

- Charles O'Conor (historian) (1710–1791), Irish writer, historian, and antiquarian
- Charles O'Conor (priest) (1764–1828), Irish priest and historian, grandson of the above
- Charles O'Conor (American politician) (1804–1884), American lawyer and 1872 presidential candidate
- Charles Owen O'Conor (1838–1906), Irish MP

== See also ==
- Charles O'Connor (disambiguation)
- Charles Connor (disambiguation)
