= Midwest Museum of American Art =

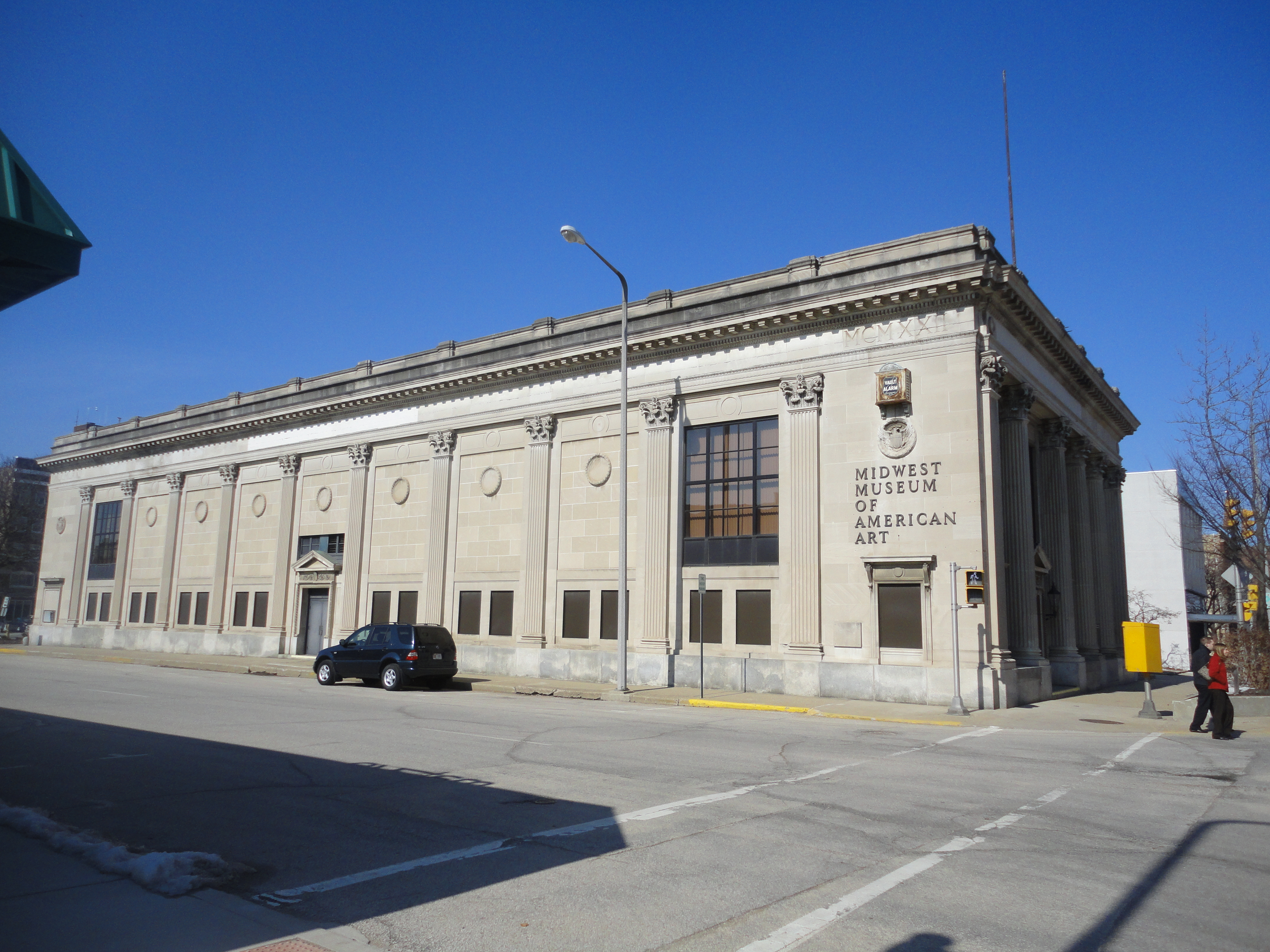
- Established: 1979
- Location: 429 South Main Street, Elkhart, Indiana, US, 46516 (574) 293-6660
- Coordinates: 41.6832°N 85.9718°W
- Type: Art museum
- Website: midwestmuseum.us

The Midwest Museum of American Art is a non-profit public art museum located in downtown Elkhart, Indiana, United States.

The museum's 25,000-square-foot (2,300 m^{2}) space houses a collection focusing on 19th and 20th century American art. Its collection includes selections of Abstract expressionism, American Impressionism, the Chicago Imagists, Overbeck art pottery, Pop art, Regionalism, the Ashcan School, and Western art (art from the American West). Artworks in the collection include works by Norman Rockwell, Hans Hofmann, Edward Moran, Roger Brown, Grant Wood, Arthur Bowen Davies, Ralph Albert Blakelock and many others.

Each fall the museum hosts the Elkhart Juried Regional competition. The museum publishes a quarterly newsletter and published its first Catalogue of the Permanent Collection in 2004.
