= Charles Fremont Conner =

American painter

- Born: February 4, 1857; Wayne County, Indiana
- Died: February 15, 1905 (aged 48); Fountain City, Indiana
- Resting place: Earlham Cemetery
- Notable work: Wet Night in February
- Style: Impressionism
- Movement: Richmond Group
- Patrons: Emil Deitz

Charles Fremont Conner (1857–1905) was an American artist who was one of the most important painters in the Richmond Group in Richmond, Indiana.

Conner is considered as one of the most talented early Richmond artists. He was self-taught and began his career as an industrial painter for the Hoosier Drill Company where he painted decorations and small landscape scenes on farm machinery.

Along with artists Frank J. Girardin (1856–1945), Micajah Thomas Nordyke (1847–1919), and his brother Albert Clinton Conner (1848–1929), Charles helped found the Rambler’s Sketch Club (c.1881); John Elwood Bundy (1853–1933) soon joined their group. The Rambler’s Sketch Club later metamorphosed into the Richmond Art Association (founded 1898, but had exhibited art in schools as early as 1896), which subsequently became the Richmond Art Museum.

Conner became a close friend to painter John Elwood Bundy and exhibited his works alongside the Richmond Group artists. He was a plein-air painter and often spent long periods of time living in a tent and painting outdoors. In 1887, he moved to California with his brother Albert, also a painter. He spent the next eight years painting the Pacific Coast before he would return to Richmond. It was during this time that his painting improved immensely.

In 1904, Conner made a place for himself in the art world by having his masterpiece, Wet Night in February exhibited in the main hall of the St. Louis World’s Fair alongside works by nationally recognized artists.

Yet despite his talent and recognition, the most Conner ever received in his lifetime for a work was $150. This work, The Old Swimming Hole was purchased in part by Indianapolis philanthropist, Emil Deitz and the school children of his hometown, Fountain City, Indiana who collected $50 worth of pennies to purchase the work. The painting is still owned by the Northeastern Wayne School Corporation.

In 2007, the Richmond Art Museum mounted the largest exhibition of his work ever compiled.
