= Barton S. Hays =

American painter

Barton Stone Hays (April 5, 1826 in Greenville, Ohio – March 14, 1914 in Minneapolis, Minnesota) was an early Indiana artist and teacher.

He was a self-taught artist who was known for his portraits, landscapes and still life paintings. While working in Indiana from 1850 to 1882, Hays taught such important young artists as William Forsyth, John Elwood Bundy and William Merritt Chase. Hays' portrait of Indiana Territorial Governor William Henry Harrison is part of the official collection of portraits of Indiana governors.
