= Cambridge City Historic District =

Historic district in Indiana, United States

- U.S. National Register of Historic Places
- U.S. Historic district
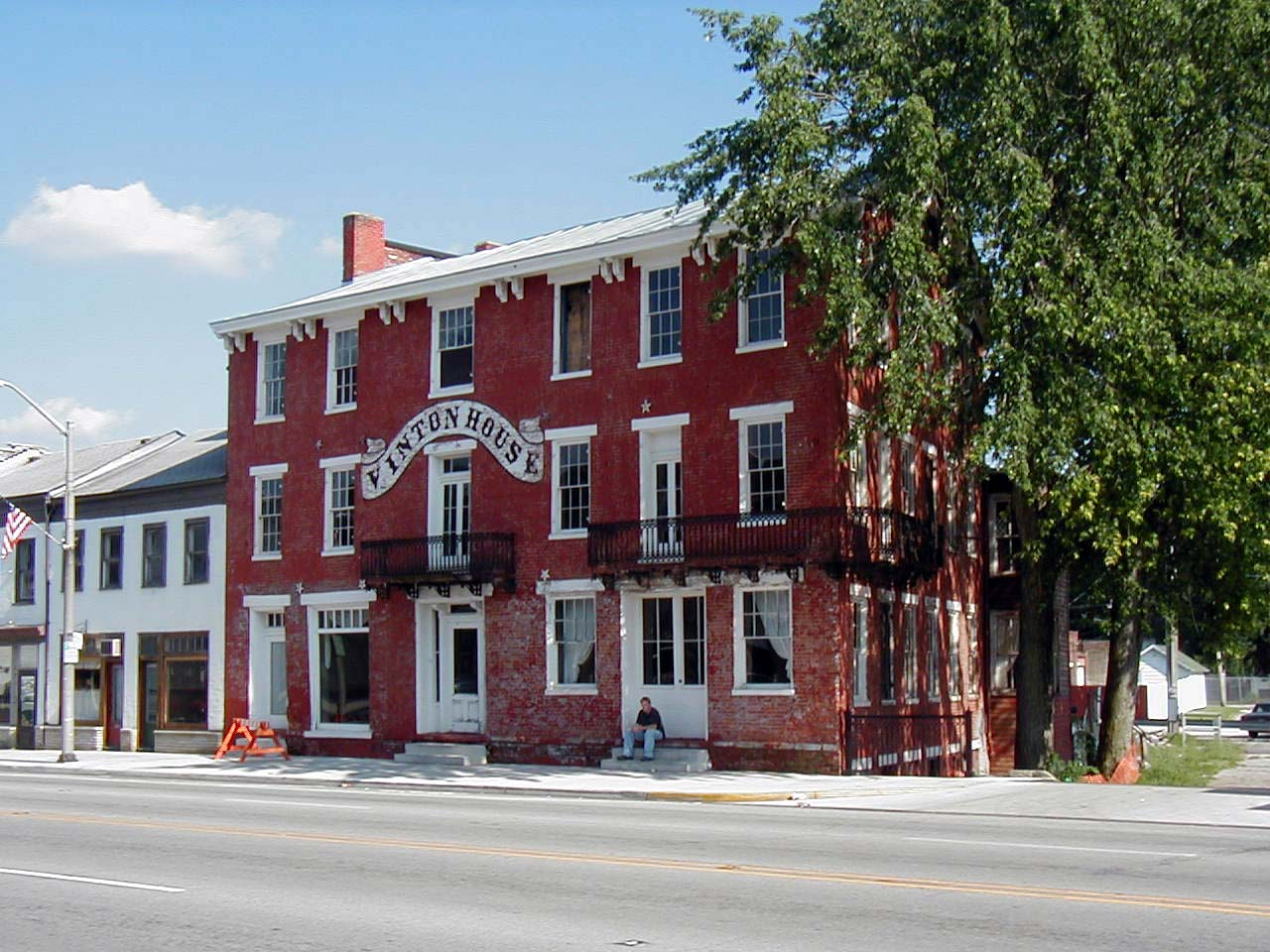
- Vinton House, May 2004

- Location within Indiana Location within the United States
- Location: Roughly bounded by Boundary, Maple, High and Fourth Sts., Cambridge City, Indiana
- Coordinates: 39°48′41″N 85°10′16″W
- Area: 170 acres (69 ha)
- Architectural style: Greek Revival, Italianate, Federal
- NRHP reference No.: 91000787
- Added to NRHP: June 14, 1991

Cambridge City Historic District is a national historic district located at Cambridge City, Indiana. The district encompasses 572 contributing buildings and two contributing structures in the central business district and surrounding residential sections of Cambridge City. It developed between about 1838 and 1939 and includes representative examples of Greek Revival, Italianate, and Federal style architecture. Located in the district are the separately listed Conklin-Montgomery House and Lackey-Overbeck House. Other notable contributing buildings include the Vinton House (1849), Opera House (1876), Western Wayne Bank (c. 1884), Grand Theater (c. 1880), Knights of Pythias Building (1899), Public Library (1936), U.S. Post Office (1940), City Building (1901), Crum-Swiggett House (c. 1840), Old Bertsch Foundry (1853), Presbyterian Church (1858), St. Elizabeth's Roman Catholic Church (1880), and Central School (1935).

The district was added to the National Register of Historic Places in 1991.
