= Francis Focer Brown =

American painter

- Born: January 19, 1891; Glassboro, New Jersey
- Died: April 14, 1971 (aged 80); Muncie, Indiana
- Known for: Painting
- Spouse(s): Beulah Elizabeth (Hazelrigg) Brown (1892–1987), married January 4, 1916

Francis Focer Brown (January 19, 1891 – April 14, 1971) was an American Impressionist painter, as well as professor and head of the Fine Arts Department at Ball State Teachers College (present-day Ball State University) in Muncie, Indiana from 1925 until his retirement as Professor Emeritus in 1957, and was director of the Ball State Art Gallery until 1946. He exhibited his work at the Hoosier Salon shows between 1922 and 1964, winning several awards for his oils, pastels, and watercolors between 1925 and 1945. He also won prizes for works he exhibited at the John Herron Art Institute and the Richmond Art Museum in 1922. In addition, he exhibited his work at the Herron School of Art Museum, Ball State University, Indiana Art Club shows, and the Indiana State Fair, as well as exhibitions at the Pennsylvania Academy of Fine Arts in 1922 and 1923, and Cincinnati Museum of Art between 1922 and 1925.

Brown studied with Hoosier Group painter J. Ottis Adams while still a high school student before enrolling at the John Herron Art Institute, where he studied under Hoosier Group painter William Forsyth. Brown also studied at Ball State, and earned a Master of Arts degree from Ohio State University. Brown was a member Indiana Art Club and the Hoosier Salon. His work is held in collections at John Herron Art Institute (present-day Indianapolis Museum of Art), Ball State University, the Richmond (Indiana) Art Museum, and in various schools and libraries throughout Indiana.

== Early life and education ==
Francis Focer Brown was born in Glassboro, New Jersey, on January 19, 1891. He later relocated with his family to Muncie, Indiana, where he attended school. Brown's talent in art was apparent at an early age. He began formal art training with private art instruction from Hoosier Group painter J. Ottis Adams at The Hermitage (Adams's home in Brookville, Indiana) The course that Adams offered lasted only seven weeks, so Brown rented a room to be near Adams, whom he described in later years as "a wonderfully kind and inspiring teacher"

After high school, Brown enrolled at the John Herron Art Institute, where he studied under Hoosier Group painter William Forsyth, and graduated from Herron in 1916. Brown also studied at Earlham College in Richmond, Indiana, Ball State University, and later earned a Master of Arts degree from Ohio State University. In addition to Adams and Forsyth, James R. Hopkins was another of Brown's instructors.

== Marriage and family ==
While a student at the Herron Art Institute in 1915, Brown met Beulah Hazelrigg. They married on January 4, 1916, about three months after they first met. Hazelrigg (1892–1987), an Indiana native, taught school for two years at Oolitic, Indiana, and graduated from Cincinnati Conservatory of Music in 1913 before enrolling at the Herron Art Institute on scholarship in the fall of 1915. Brown and Hazelrigg were students of William Forsyth, who felt that art students should make art their priority and remain single. Ignoring their art teacher's advice, they married while they were still students. The Browns spent the remainder of their lives together as artists and educators. They also had two sons: Hillis Alvin (1919–1983) and Folger Wescott (1922–??). During the Great Depression, Brown's widowed mother-in-law moved in with the family to help with the housekeeping and childcare, so that he and his wife could pursue their careers.

== Career ==
After graduating from the John Herron Art Institute in 1916, Brown taught at Wingate and Mitchell, Indiana, for two years. In 1918 he became a teacher at Richmond, Indiana, where the Browns remained for the next seven years. Brown joined the faculty at Ball State Teachers College (present-day Ball State University), in 1925. The family, which now included two sons, moved to Muncie, Indiana, which remained Brown's home until his death in 1971. In 1932, the Browns had an art studio added to the rear of their home, where they worked on their art. The studio was also a gathering place for their two sons and their friends. Brown was a professor and director of Ball State's Fine Arts Department from 1925 to 1957, when he retired as Professor Emeritus. He was also director of the Ball State Art Gallery until 1946.

As Brown pursued a career as an art educator, his artistic progress earned him recognition as a talented painter. Brown regularly exhibited his art at Hoosier Salon shows between 1922 and 1964, where he won a number of cash awards for his oils, pastels, and watercolors in 1925, 1926, 1928, 1929, 1937, and in 1945. He also exhibited his work at the Pennsylvania Academy of Fine Arts in 1922 and 1923, the Indiana Art Club, the John Herron Art Institute, the Cincinnati Museum of Art, the Richmond Art Association, and the Indiana State Fair. Brown won prizes at a Richmond Art Association exhibition and at a Herron exhibition in 1922. He also exhibited his work at Western Art Association shows, as well as the Cleveland Museum of Art and other local, regional, and national art exhibitions and organizations, including the Richmond Group, a well-known collective of Indiana artists working in the Richmond, Indiana, area.

Brown was diagnosed with glaucoma in 1949 and retired from teaching at Ball State in 1957. Brown gave up his studio at Ball State, but continued to paint in retirement in the home studio he shared with his wife. In his later years, as he began working more hours at home, Brown switched from oils to water-based media such as tempera, acrylic, watercolor, pastel, charcoal and pencil, largely because oils irritated Beulah Brown's allergies. Only a small percentage of his work was created in encaustics or oils.

== Lifeworks ==
During his formative years as an educator, Brown developed a personal style that bordered on Impressionism. His juxtaposed strokes of contrasting color later lead him to better understand and assimilate his own version of Impressionism. Unlike many other impressionists of the era, Brown expanded the boundaries of Impressionism beyond many of his contemporaries, including departures that encompassed both the Fauve and Expressionist movements. In his artistic expressions, Brown experimented with bold colors and, often, nearly formless subject matter that was intertwined with atmospherics and light in a manner similar in stubstance to Charles Burchfield's watercolors and Vincent van Gogh's signature style, especially when Brown worked in egg tempera or in oils.

Throughout his life, Brown maintained a consistent pattern of experimentation, clearly demonstrating his intention to move beyond Impressionism. Brown's subject matter often focused on the Hoosier countryside using atmospheric effects and light. Works undertaken later in his later years were much more broadly brush stroked that his earlier works, often focusing on life pictures that reveal a spontaneity to those in his early landscapes.

Among his peers, Brown's interpretation of atmospherics was regarded as vastly superior to many of his older colleagues, who largely sacrificed their conservative palettes in order to exploit a more decorative artificiality. Brown's use of brightly pigmented tempera, which created a depth and texture similar to that found in many of the great Post-Impressionist painters, appears to amplify the effects of atmospherics and light. Brown's subject matter was equally far reaching, including portraits, still life, marine art, landscape art, architectural art, and industrial scenes.

Brown's work, particularly in several spontaneous pieces, depicted aspects of the Midwestern environment and everyday life. His brushwork and use of bright pigments simplified elements and forms within his compositions.

== Death and legacy ==
After his death on April 14, 1971, at the age of eighty, the Muncie Star described Brown's work as art which "didn’t attempt to cure the World’s ills or point out a message."

Brown's imagery and style greatly expanded the scope of basic Midwestern impressionism far beyond those of his contemporaries.

Brown's works are in the collections of the Ball State University Museum of Art, the Indianapolis Museum of Art (formerly the Herron Art Institute), and the Richmond Art Museum.

Brown's portrait was painted by Wayman Elbridge Adams, who studied at the Herron School of Art and was known for his portraiture that included prominent artists, political leaders, and authors such as Booth Tarkington.

== See also ==
- Who's Who in American Art
