= Beulah H. Brown =

American artist

Beulah Hazelrigg Brown
- Born: Beulah Elizabeth Hazelrigg; November 24, 1892; Napoleon, Ripley County, Indiana, U.S.
- Died: March 26, 1987 (aged 94); Muncie, Delaware County, Indiana, U.S.
- Education: Art Academy of Cincinnati; John Herron Art Institute
- Known for: Textile design and painting

Beulah Elizabeth Hazelrigg Brown (November 24, 1892 – March 26, 1987) was a Hoosier painter, educator, and textile designer who is best known for her bold, colorful, abstract patterns for fabrics, as well as figure, genre, landscapes, and floral still-life paintings in watercolor, her preferred media. Winter snow scenes, which she began painting in 1949, were another of her specialties. She also made decorative naïve paintings in her later years.

Born in Napoleon, Indiana, and a longtime resident of Muncie, Indiana, where she maintained an art studio in her home, Brown graduated from the Cincinnati Conservatory of Music in 1913 and trained in art at the John Herron Art Institute in 1915–16 with William Forsyth, an art educator and a Hoosier Group member of Impressionist painters. Brown also taught in several schools in Indiana and became supervisor of occupational therapy and a teacher of art and music at the New Castle State Hospital in New Castle, Indiana. She was married to Francis Focer Brown, an American Impressionist painter and a professor and director of Ball State University's Fine Art Department from 1925 to 1957 and also a former student of Forsyth.

== Early life and education ==
Beulah Elizabeth Hazelrigg was born on November 24, 1892, in Napoleon, Indiana, and grew up in Mitchell, Indiana. Hazelrigg became a student of art in 1915, after spending two years as an art and music teacher at a school in Oolitic, Indiana, and graduating from the Cincinnati Conservatory of Music in 1913. She had studied art briefly at the conservatory and became interested enough to seek additional training. In 1915, after beginning her career as a teacher, Hazelrigg enrolled on a scholarship at the John Herron Art Institute where Hoosier Group painter William Forsyth was her teacher, and remained an art student at Herron until 1916. Following her marriage to Francis Focer Brown in 1916 and their relocation to Muncie, Indiana, in 1925, she continued art studies at Ball State University, although she never earned a formal art degree there. In addition to her instruction with Forsyth, her other art instructors included Otto Stark, Clifton Wheeler, and Harold Haven Brown.

== Marriage and family ==
Beulah Hazelrigg married Frances Focer Brown, a fellow student at Herron, on January 4, 1916, about three months after they met. Brown (1891–1971), a native of New Jersey, grew up in Muncie, Indiana, and studied painting with Hoosier Group painter J. Ottis Adams before enrolling at Herron, where Brown and Hazelrigg both studied under William Forsyth, also a noted Hoosier Group painter and American impressionist artist. Forsyth did not approve of married women pursuing a career as professional artists. He also felt that art students should make art their priority and remain single. If women artists married, Forsyth thought they should focus on family life. Hazelrigg and Brown ignored Forsyth's advice and married while they were still students at Herron. The Browns spend the remainder of their lives together and continued their careers as painters and art educators. They also had two sons, Hillis Alvin (1919–1983) and Folger Wescott (1922–??).

== Career ==
After Francis Brown graduated from Herron in 1916, the couple taught art for two years around Indiana before finally settling in New Richmond and in Mitchell, Indiana. In 1918 Francis Brown took a teaching position at Richmond, Indiana, where the Browns resided for the next seven years. While her husband taught in Richmond, Beulah Brown taught art and music at rural schools in the area. In 1925, when Francis Brown joined the faculty of Ball State Teachers College (present-day Ball State University), the Brown family, which now included two sons, moved to Muncie, Indiana. Francis and Beulah Brown remained Muncie residents until their deaths.

During the Great Depression, Beulah Brown's widowed mother moved in with the family to assist with the housework and childcare, allowing Beulah and her husband to continue painting and earning an income from teaching. Francis Brown was a professor and director of Ball State's Fine Art Department from 1925 to 1957, when he retired as Professor Emeritus. Beulah Brown also taught to supplement the family's household income, becoming supervisor of occupational therapy and a teacher of art and music at the New Castle State Hospital in New Castle, Indiana. In 1932, the Browns had an art studio added to the rear of their home, where Beulah and Francis often worked on their art projects. It was also a family gathering place, with their two sons and children from the neighborhood were welcome to play.

== Later years ==
Francis Brown was diagnosed with glaucoma in 1949 and retired from teaching at Ball State in 1957. Beulah Brown retired from her position as supervisor and teacher at the New Castle State Hospital the following year. In their retirement years, the Browns continued to paint in their home studio. Because her husband's poor eyesight, Beulah Brown would prepare his palette, arranging the colors in a specific order. Sales from her paintings helped supplement the family income after he retired from teaching and his painting career was curtailed because of his failing eyesight. Francis Brown died in 1971, and Beulah Brown continued painting in the home studio she had shared with him.

== Artworks and influences ==
Brown is best known for her work as a textile designer, with a special interest in fabric design, and for her figure, genre, landscape, winter snow scenes, and floral still-life paintings. Her preferred media was watercolor, largely because oils irritated her allergies. Brown's allergies also shaped the other media in which she and her husband worked. In addition to watercolor, she also made crayon drawings and paintings. Her husband also painted in watercolor, especially after his retirement from Ball State, when he began to spend more time painting in their home studio.

Brown's bold, colorful, abstract patterns, frequently drawing upon her flower garden for ideas, were used in various textiles and fabric designs. She sold her designs to companies in Saint Louis, Missouri, and in New York City. Brown also made floral still-life paintings in watercolor that were slightly stylized and more realistic than her textiles. In December 1949, she began to paint snow scenes, which became a well-known theme among her works. Brown's winter snow scenes and genre scenes were regarded as her specialty. In her later years, she did a series of decorative naïve paintings, dismissing the comparisons of her works to those by Grandma Moses. Brown did not think there were similarities, pointing out that she had formal art training while Moses was a self-taught, American folk artist.

Brown's distinctive style later led to her inclusion in the "Group of Twelve," contemporary Indiana women artists whose works blend physical, intellectual, and emotional intensity. In addition to Brown, this group of artists include, among others, Betsy Stirratt, Charlene Marsh, Karen Thompson, and Bonnie Sklarski. Highlights of this group's art were later illustrated in Matter, Mind, Spirit: 12 Contemporary Indiana Women Artists, a catalog of an exhibit curated and assembled by Indiana University – Purdue University Indianapolis, Herron School of Art and Design professor Jean Robertson.

== Death and legacy ==
Beulah Brown died on March 26, 1987, at Muncie, Indiana. Her art has been exhibited at shows in Mitchell, New Castle, and Hanover, Indiana; Ball State University in Muncie; Earlham College in Richmond; in public libraries in Richmond and New Castle, Indiana; at the Indiana State Fair; and in 1958 and 1964 at the Hoosier Salon exhibition in Indianapolis, Indiana.Brown's art is also included in the collection of the Richmond Art Museum in Richmond, Indiana.

== Honors and awards ==
- Honorable Mention, Richmond Art Association exhibition, 1955
- Hallmark-Art Association Award, 1971

== Memberships ==
Brown was a member of the Hoosier Salon Patron's Association, the Delaware County [Indiana] Artists, the Muncie Art Association, and the Allied Arts Club (New Castle, Indiana).
