= Mary Foulke Morrisson =

American suffragist (1876–1971)

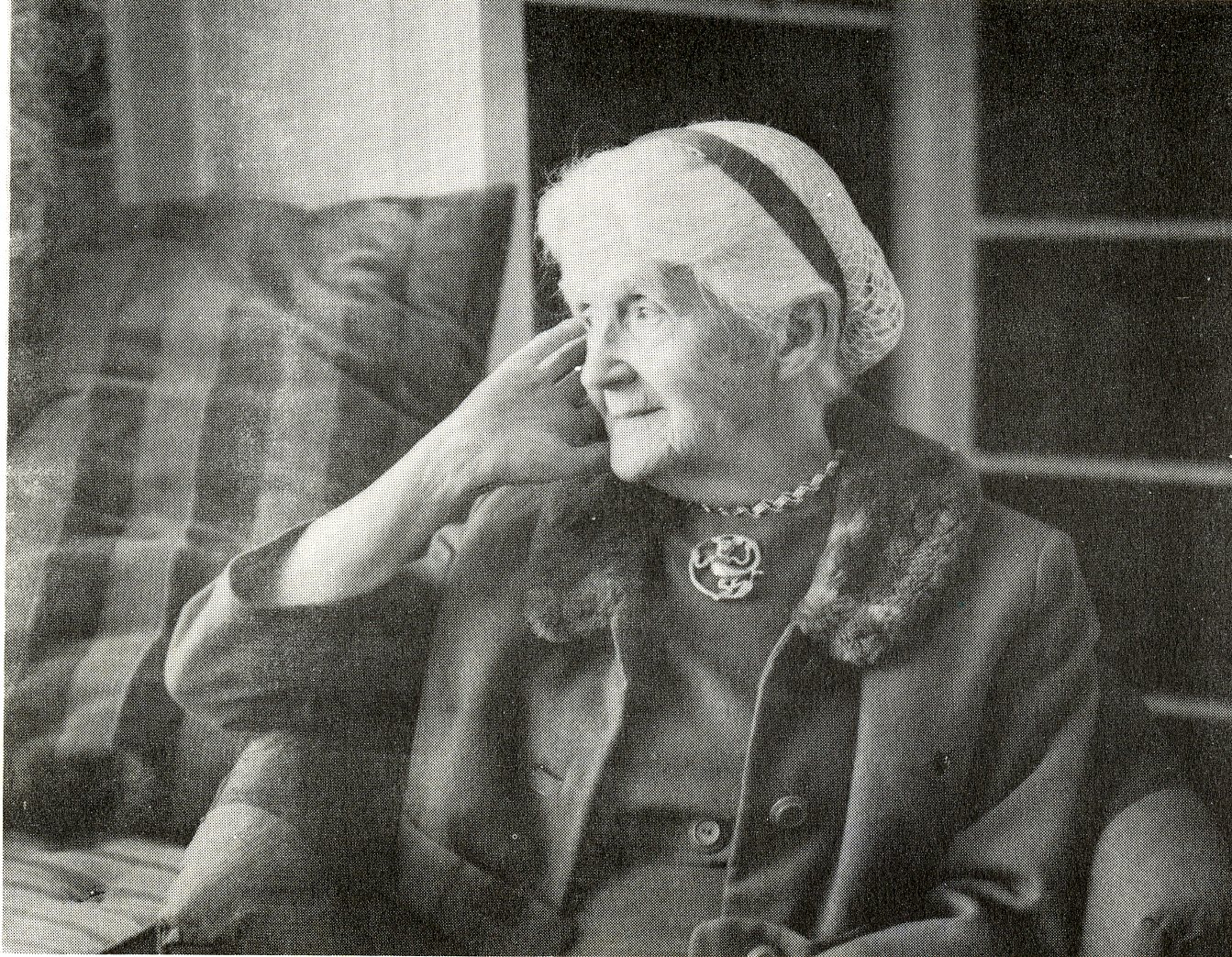
- Mary Foulke Morrisson c. 1960
- Born: Mary Taylor Reeves Foulke; November 14, 1879; Richmond, Indiana
- Died: March 9, 1971 (aged 91)
- Education: Bryn Mawr College
- Occupations: Suffragist, social activist
- Spouse: James William Morrisson (m. 1900)
- Parent(s): William Dudley Foulke; Mary Taylor Reeves Foulke

Mary Taylor Reeves Foulke Morrisson (November 14, 1879 - March 9, 1971) was an American suffragist and social activist. She was a pioneer in the Women's rights movement and was a prominent member of the Board of Trustees at Connecticut College for 28 years. Morrisson graduated from Bryn Mawr College in 1899, where she studied chemistry, biology, and government. In 1900, she married James William Morrisson, president of Fuller-Morrisson Co., wholesale druggists.

== Career ==
Morrisson began civic work in 1904, then started making contributions to women's political advancement starting in 1905 in Richmond, Indiana. She was one of the nation's earliest social workers working with Jane Addams in creating the nation's first settlement house: Hull House in Chicago, Illinois. Her work at Hull House helped improve job conditions in shops and factories. Morrisson then moved on to the suffrage movement, devoting her career to helping women gain the right to vote. Morrisson was one of the nation's earliest anti-war advocates, as a member of the National Committee on the Cause and Cure of War. This committee was the largest American women's peace group in the 1920s. The United States government called upon Morrisson to be a spokeswoman at high-level meetings at home and abroad for peace. A highlight of her peace work came when Morrisson represented the United States at the Conference on the Cause and Cure of War at the signing of the Kellogg Briand Peace Pact at the Paris Conference in 1928. This pattern of civic work, suffrage movement, and anti-war activism that Morrisson followed was common among upper and middle-class women, directly linked to family responsibilities. She moved to Connecticut to start the Connecticut League of Women Voters. Morrisson found herself at home as she started work at "Connecticut College for Women" advancing young women's education. Morrisson joined the Connecticut College Board of Trustees in 1937 and was Secretary of the Board from 1938 to 1965. She also was on the state board of Connecticut at different times and then went onto the Board of Groton and New London Leagues. She was the President of New London League from 1935 to 1944.

== Career in the suffrage movement ==
Morrisson began her work in the suffrage movement by working formally with Carrie Chapman Catt, president of the American Woman Suffrage Association. Morrisson was named the Secretary of the Chicago Women's Suffrage Assn. from 1912 to 1915, then President from 1915 to 1919. In 1916, she organized a suffrage parade for the National American Woman Suffrage Association (NAWSA) through Chicago to that year's Republican National Convention where she obtained the first women's suffrage plank in the G.O.P. national platform. Morrisson, served as recording secretary of the organization and fundraised by speaking at fifty fund-raising occasions in multiple states including Illinois, Indiana, Iowa, and the Mississippi conference. Morrisson went on to help found the League of Women's Voters in which she then held national, state, and local offices. Then, Morrisson established the Illinois and Connecticut League of Women's Voters, of which she was the president from 1925 to 1928 Morrisson was also the first Vice President of the National League of Women's Voters. After working with many others towards the 19th Amendment, she went onto second the nomination of Herbert Hoover at the 1920 Republican National Convention in the first American election in which women we able to exercise their right to vote. In 1960, Morrisson appeared on a CBS News in a program called "Women And The Vote" a documentary which demonstrated how women got the vote and what suffrage has meant in the political life of the United States. Ted Holmes F.Y.I of CBS News called Mrs. Morrisson, "an invaluable asset in the brining the passions, defects and victories of the suffrage movement to light for our audience."

== Honors and awards ==
Morrisson was awarded The Connecticut Medal for Distinguished Civilian War Service in November 1944, The Civilian and Military Certificate of Appreciation for recreation work in Groton, from the U.S. Navy in 1946, Jane Addams Memorial Medal, and The Distinguished Citizen Award from the Men's Club Beth El, Newon. Morrisson was named an Honorary Alumni at Connecticut College in 1960.

== Legacy ==
In 1965, the Connecticut League of Women Voters established the Morrisson Internship Program, providing summer internships for Connecticut College students at the League of Women Voters headquarters in Washington, DC. This Internship was dedicated to Morrisson to highlight her work at the League of Women's Voters during the suffrage movement. The Mary Morrisson School in Groton is dedicated to her because of the immense recreational work she did in Groton, where she lived for 60 years. The Mary Foulke Morrisson House at Connecticut College is named after her because of her dedication to advancing the college. Morrisson also has an annual lectureship with the focal point foreign policy named after her: "Mary Foulke Morrisson Lectureship".
