= Conklin-Montgomery House =

Historic house in Indiana, United States

- U.S. National Register of Historic Places
- U.S. Historic district – Contributing property
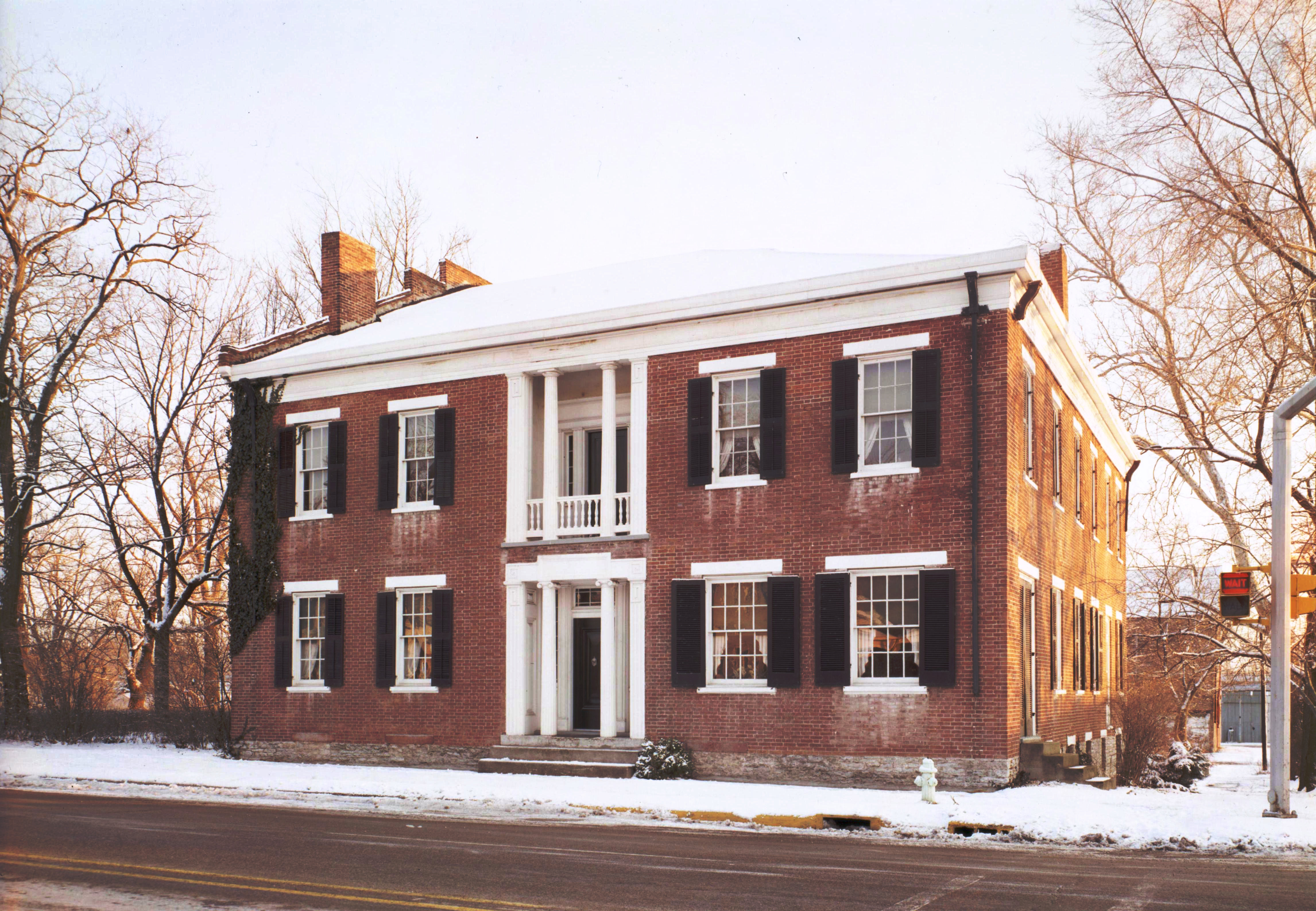
- Conklin-Montgomery House, January 1975

- Location within Indiana Location within the United States
- Location: 302 E. Main St., Cambridge City, Indiana
- Coordinates: 39°48′45″N 85°9′52″W
- Area: 0.5 acres (0.20 ha)
- Built: c. 1836-1838
- NRHP reference No.: 75000033
- Added to NRHP: February 24, 1975

Conklin-Montgomery House is a historic home located at Cambridge City, Indiana. It was built between about 1836 and 1838, and is a two-story, five-bay, brick hip and end gable roofed townhouse. It features a two-story, in antis, recessed portico with a second story balcony supported by Ionic order and Doric order columns. Also on the property is a contributing pre-American Civil War gazebo.

It was listed on the National Register of Historic Places in 1975. It is located in the Cambridge City Historic District.
