= William Dudley Foulke =

American literary critic and journalist

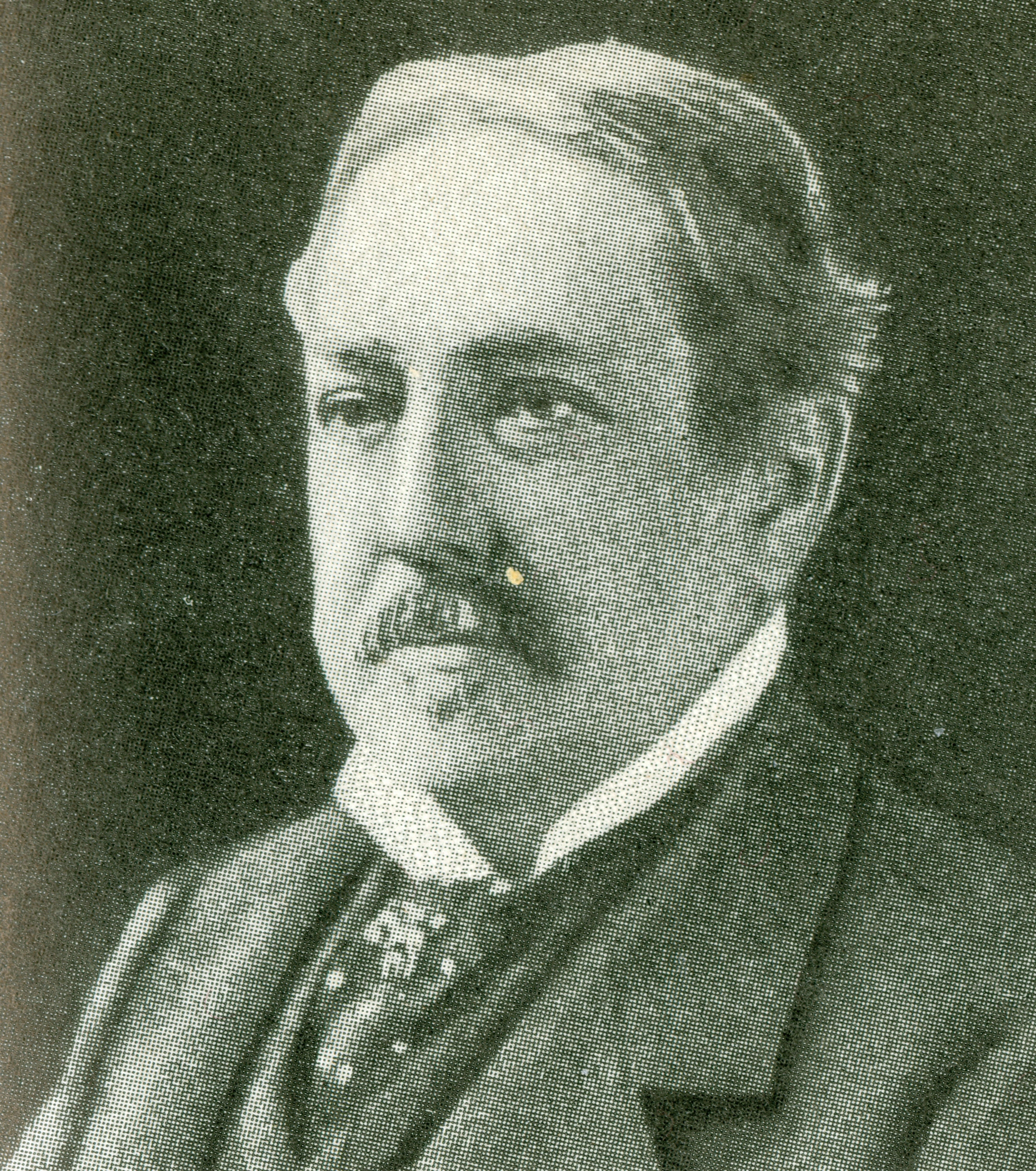
- Born: November 20, 1848; New York City, New York, U.S.
- Died: May 30, 1935 (aged 86); Richmond, Indiana, U.S.
- Education: Columbia University; Columbia Law School
- Spouse: Mary Taylor Reeves Foulke (m. 1872)
- Children: Mary Foulke Morrisson

William Dudley Foulke (November 20, 1848 – May 30, 1935) was an American literary critic, journalist, poet, and reformer.

== Biography ==
Maya: a Story of Yucatan book published in 1901

William Dudley Foulke was born in New York City on November 20, 1848. He graduated Columbia University in 1869, where he was a member of the Philolexian Society, and Columbia Law School in 1871. He practiced law in New York until 1876, when he moved to Richmond, Indiana, and married Mary Taylor Reeves.

Foulke became involved in local politics and was elected to the Indiana Senate, serving from 1882 to 1886. As a senator, he introduced bills to reform the state's civil service system. In addition, he investigated abuses against inmates and employees at the state hospital for the insane. He served on the Platform Committee of the Progressive Party. In 1889 he was asked by the National Civil Service Reform League to investigate the U.S. Federal civil service. President Theodore Roosevelt appointed Foulke a Commissioner in the Civil Service Commission in 1901.

He was a critic of the Ku Klux Klan, which had strong membership in Richmond and was threatened with flogging for his views.

He was also one of the early presidents of the American Woman Suffrage Association, the first president of the Proportional Representation League, and (for five years) president of the National Municipal League.

As a writer, Foulke wrote on several diverse subjects. In 1898, he published a biography of Oliver Hazard Perry Morton. Later, he translated the medieval History of the Lombards by Paul the Deacon. His other works include Biographical Introduction to Some Love Poems of Petrarch (1916). Some of his poems include Honor to France. Foulke wrote two memoirs: Fighting the Spoilsmen (1919), where he recounted his career in fighting for civil service reform. There followed a more general reminiscence, A Hoosier Autobiography (1922).

Foulke was a major supporter of the Richmond Group of artists and was one of the founders of the Richmond Art Museum in 1898. He loaned paintings for early exhibitions and donated many works to the museum's permanent collection.

He died at his home in Richmond on May 30, 1935, and was buried at Spring Grove Cemetery in Cincinnati.

== Friend of Russian Freedom ==
Foulke was interested in Russia and Russian history since the 1880s. He was scared by the encroachments of the Russian Empire in Central Asia and the Far East. He supposed that Russian ambitious foreign politics would be a great menace to "free Institutions". In 1887 he published a pamphlet "Slav or Saxon", showing the aggressive intentions of the Tsarist regime. At that time he also protested against the ratification of the Russian-American Extradition treaty, but all efforts were in vain. In 1893 the treaty was ratified.

In 1903 Foulke became the president of the Society of Friends of Russian Freedom. The society was re-established in Boston by Alice Stone Blackwell. As Foulke recalled, "This association had no very definite organization, but acted as occasion offered". Foulke and other notable Americans (Blackwell, Wald, Howe, Addams) who endorsed Russian revolutionists and liberals in their fight against the autocracy encouraged Russian emigre Breshko-Breskovskaya in 1904–1905 when she arrived in the US for tapping moral support and some money.

== In popular culture ==
Foulke appears as a supporting character in Harry Turtledove's alternate history novel series Southern Victory, where he follows a military career rather than in writing and politics.

== Works ==
- — (1919). Fighting the Spoilsmen: Reminiscences of The Civil Service Reform Movement. New York: G. P. Putnam's Sons.
- —; Paulus Diaconus (1906). History of the Langobards. New York: Longmans, Green & Co.
