= Lackey-Overbeck House =

Historic house in Indiana, United States

- U.S. National Register of Historic Places
- U.S. Historic district – Contributing property
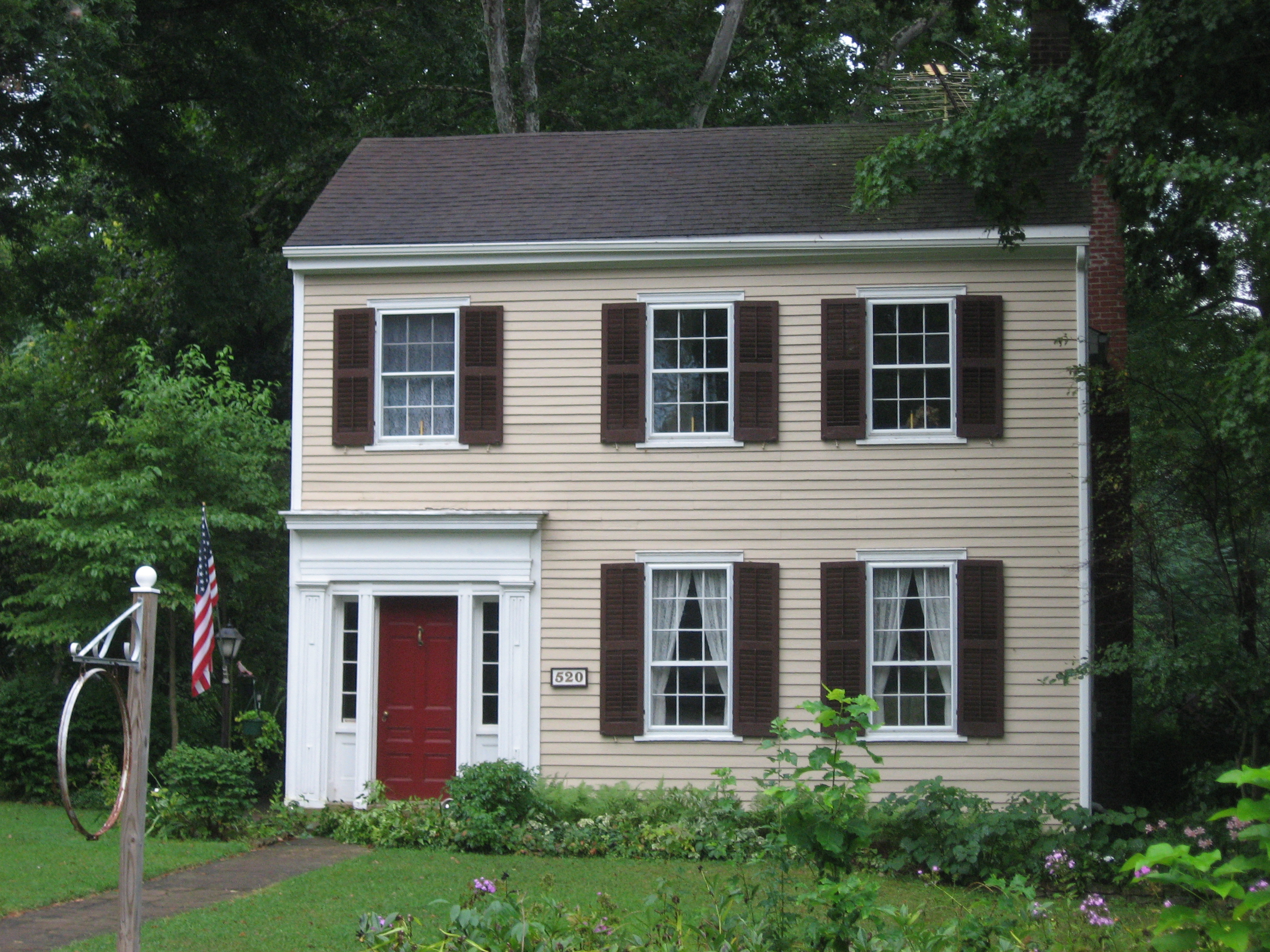
- Lackey-Overbeck House, August 2011

- Location within Indiana
- Location: 520 E. Church St., Cambridge City, Indiana
- Coordinates: 39°48′42″N 85°9′42″W
- Area: less than one acre
- Built: c. 1835, c. 1850
- Built by: Lackey, Ira
- Architectural style: Greek Revival, Federal
- NRHP reference No.: 76000030
- Added to NRHP: May 28, 1976

The Lackey-Overbeck House, also known as the Lackey-Cockefair-Overbeck-Matheis House, is a historic home located in the Cambridge City Historic District in Cambridge City, Indiana. Built around 1835 by architect Ira Lackey, the house incorporates elements typical of canal boom-era homes. It is a two-story, three-bay, frame dwelling with Federal and Greek Revival style design elements. A two-story rear wing was added in about 1850.

In 1882, the property was purchased by the Overbeck family. Following their parents' deaths, four of the Overbeck daughters—Margaret, Hannah, Elizabeth, and Mary Frances—repurposed the house as a pottery studio, which they named Overbeck Pottery. They constructed a workshop in the basement, and Margaret, who had been an art teacher at DePauw University, conducted classes. Their pottery was widely recognized for its unique colors and glazes, the formula for which was kept secret. Today, their art is featured in museum collections across the country.

The house was listed on the National Register of Historic Places in 1976.
