= Consolidated Building (Indianapolis) =

Office and residential building in Indianapolis, Indiana, U.S.

Penn Street Tower
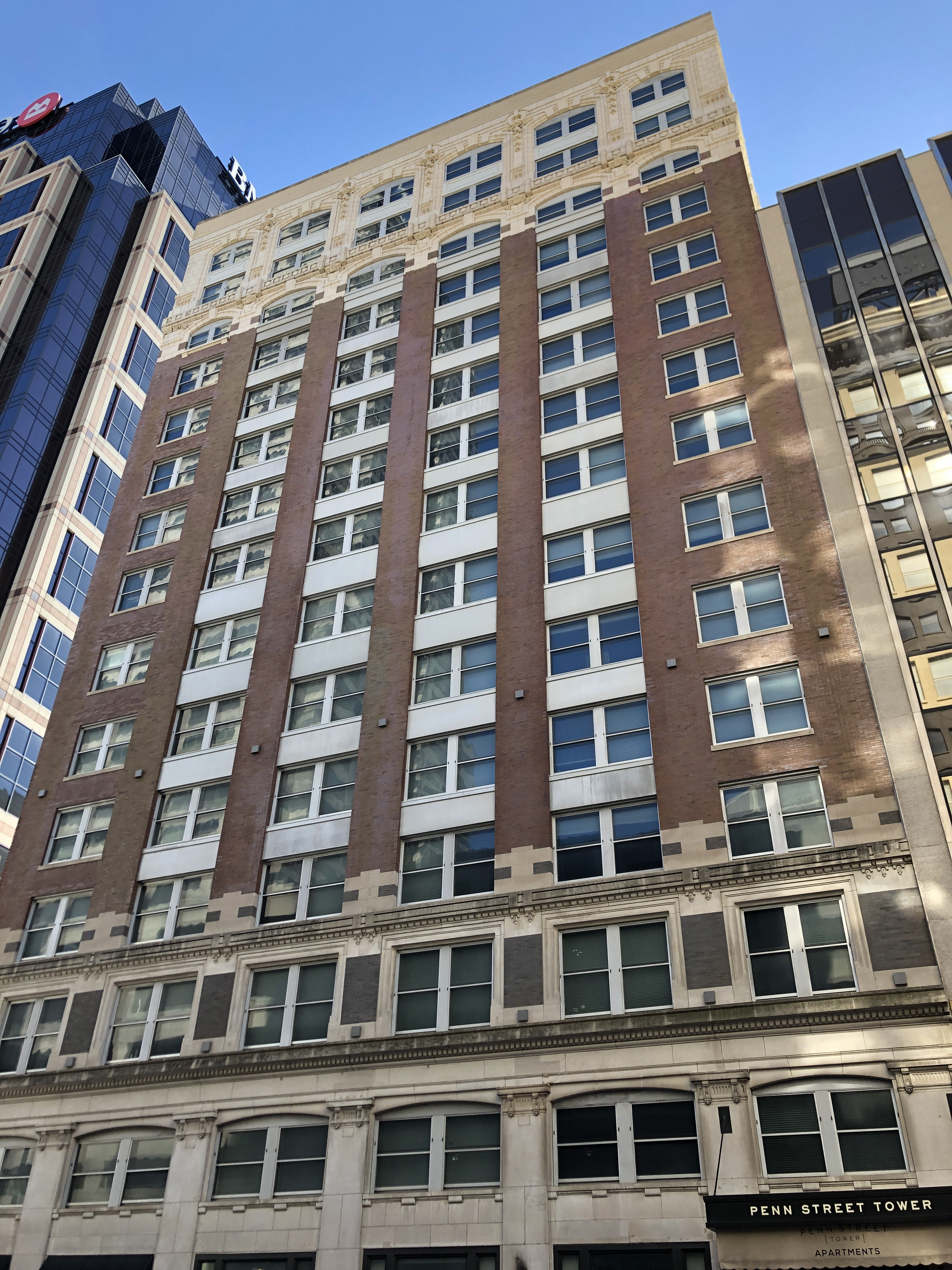

General information
- Type: Offices/Residences
- Location: 115 North Pennsylvania St., Indianapolis, Indiana
- Coordinates: 39°46′08.4″N 86°09′21.47″W
- Completed: 1910
- Owner: Whitsett Group

Height
- Roof: 191 ft (58 m)

Technical details
- Floor count: 15

Design and construction
- Architect(s): R. P. Daggett & Company

The Consolidated Building is a 15-story building at 115 North Pennsylvania Street in downtown Indianapolis, Indiana. It was constructed as an annex to the neighboring Lemcke Building and was known as the Lemcke Annex. For a number of years the building housed the headquarters of the Consolidated Insurance Company. From about 1995 it sat mostly vacant because the owner ran into financial difficulties.

In 2014 the building was sold and renovation to apartments was begun. In May 2015 the building reopened as the Penn Street Tower, with 98 apartments on 14 floors. The first floor will be used for retail and office space. The total cost of the acquisition and renovation was about $14 million.
