= Charlie O'Connor (footballer) =

Australian rules footballer

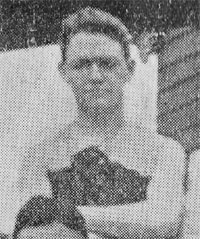
- O'Connor during his Carlton career

Personal information
- Full name: Charles Edward O'Connor
- Born: 27 May 1882; Richmond, Victoria
- Died: 4 November 1936 (aged 54); Fitzroy, Victoria
- Original team: Brunswick CYMS (CYMSFA)

Playing career^{1}
Years	Club	Games (Goals)
1902–04	Carlton	20 (0)
- ^{1} Playing statistics correct to the end of 1904.

Charles Edward O'Connor (27 May 1882 – 4 November 1936) was an Australian rules footballer who played with Carlton in the Victorian Football League (VFL).
