= William Swift Daniell =

American painter

- Born: 1865; San Francisco, California, U.S.
- Died: June 28, 1933 (aged 67–68); Los Angeles, California, U.S.
- Occupation: Painter
- Spouse: Annie Laurie Lantz

William Swift Daniell (1865 – June 28, 1933) was an American painter, and the founder of The Painters' Club of Los Angeles. He built the second studio in the art colony of Laguna Beach, California.

== Life ==
Daniell was born in 1865 in San Francisco, California. He was educated in Boston and Paris.

Daniell opened a studio in Los Angeles, where he painted watercolors. He also founded The Painters' Club of Los Angeles. He later moved to the new art colony of Laguna Beach, California, where he opened the second studio after George Gardner Symons built the first one.

Daniell married Annie Laurie Lantz. He died on June 28, 1933, in Los Angeles, California, at age 68.
