= Overbeck Sisters =

Sibling group of artists

The Overbeck sisters (Margaret, Hannah, Elizabeth, and Mary Frances) were American women potters and artists of the Arts and Crafts Movement who established Overbeck Pottery in their Cambridge City, Indiana, home in 1911 with the goal of producing original, high-quality, hand-wrought ceramics as their primary source of income. The sisters are best known for their fanciful figurines, their skill in matte glazes, and their stylized designs of plants and animals in the Art Nouveau and Art Deco styles. The women owned and handled all aspects of their artistic enterprise until 1955, when the last of the sisters died and the pottery closed. As a result of their efforts, the Overbecks managed to become economically independent and earned a modest living from the sales of their art.

Examples of their art have been exhibited at the Panama–Pacific International Exposition (1915) and the Century of Progress (1933), as well as in exhibitions hosted by the General Federation of Women's Clubs, Museum of Fine Arts, Boston, the Los Angeles County Museum of Art, and at other venues in Paris, France, and the United States. In addition, their art is included in several museum collections, and has been featured in ceramic arts and collectibles magazines and a 2006 episode of Antiques Roadshow. The Overbeck family's Cambridge City home/studio was listed on the National Register of Historic Places in 1976; the present-day home is maintained as a private residence.

== Early life and family ==
The four Overbeck sisters who became involved in making pottery were: Margaret (July 3, 1863 – August 13, 1911); Hannah Borger (March 14, 1870 – August 28, 1931); Elizabeth Gray (October 21, 1875 – December 1, 1936); and Mary Frances (January 28, 1878 – March 20, 1955). Their other siblings were Ida Alice (September 22, 1861 – 1946), Harriet Jane (January 17, 1872 – 1951), and an only brother, Charles (February 1, 1881 – 1913). The siblings changed the spelled of their surname from "Overpeck" to Overbeck around 1911.

Their parents, John Arehart Overpeck (1828–1904) and Sarah Ann (Borger) Overpeck (1840–1906), moved to Jackson Township, Wayne County, Indiana, from Overpeck, Butler County, Ohio, in 1868. The family relocated to a home on the east side of present-day Cambridge City, Indiana, in 1883. John Overpeck, a farmer and amateur cabinetmaker, was of German ancestry; Sarah Ann Overpeck, a homemaker who made quilts, rugs, and lace, was of Austrian and German ancestry. Their children grew up in Cambridge City and attended local public elementary and high school schools. At home the family was involved in creative arts, such as music, woodworking, textile arts, painting, and eventually ceramics.

Sarah Ann Overpeck discouraged her daughters from marrying; she felt that marriage would "limit their ability to fulfill their creative potential." Although Ida and Charles would later marry, Margaret, Elizabeth, Hannah, Mary Frances, and Harriett Overbeck chose not to marry. After the death of their parents in the early 1900s, the siblings retained ownership of their parents' property in common. Ida and her husband, Martin Funk, and Charles and his wife, Hallie (Hill) Overbeck, relinquished their rights to the family's Cambridge City home to Hannah, Elizabeth, Harriet, and Mary Frances after Margaret's death in 1911.

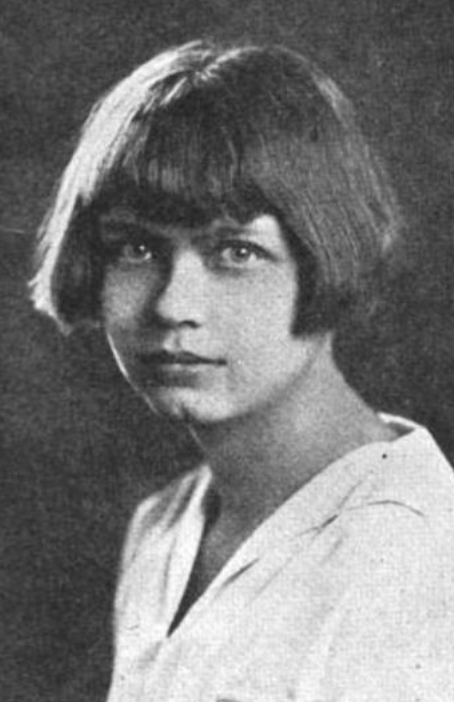
Margaret Overbeck, from a 1926 publication

=== Margaret Overbeck ===
Margaret attended the Art Academy of Cincinnati in the 1890s. She also studied with the influential designer, Arthur Wesley Dow, of Columbia University, and with Marshall Fry, a New York china painter and potter. Margaret may have taught art to her younger sisters before she began work as an art instructor at private schools, including the Sayre Institute in Lexington, Kentucky, and Megguier Seminary in Boonville, Missouri. In 1899 Margaret took a faculty position at DePauw University in Greencastle, Indiana, where she taught art, but left the university in 1907 after suffering serious head injuries in an automobile accident in Chicago, Illinois. Margaret returned to the family home in Cambridge City to recuperate.

In addition to her work as an art teacher, Margaret exhibited a watercolor at the World's Fair in St. Louis, Missouri in 1904. She was also a contributor to Keramic Studio, a china-painting publication. Her designs appeared in several issues of the specialty magazine between 1903 and 1913, most notably the March 1907 issue.

After working at a Zanesville, Ohio, pottery studio during the summer of 1910, Margaret returned home to Cambridge City, where she established an art-pottery studio with her sisters, Elizabeth, Hannah, and Mary Frances. Margaret is generally credited with the idea of the sisters establishing Overbeck Pottery in the family's Cambridge City home. She lived long enough to see the business established in early 1911, but died in Cambridge City on August 13, 1911, of complications attributed to her earlier injury in an automobile accident.

=== Hannah Overbeck ===
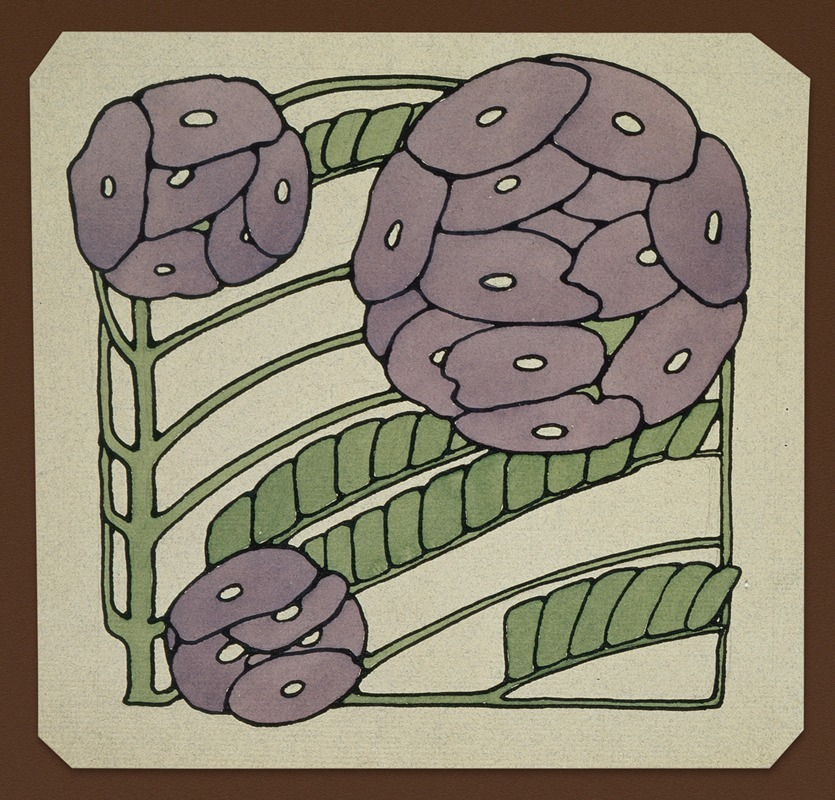
Purple Stylized By Hannah Borger Overbeck

Hannah initially studied photography with her older sister, Ida, before attending Indiana State Normal School (present-day Indiana State University) in Terre Haute, Indiana. After her graduation from college in 1894, Hannah taught school for a year in Clinton, Indiana, but ill health forced her to return home.

Hanna was a skilled sketch artist, who also painted with watercolors. From 1904 to 1916 she contributed designs to Keramic Studio. At the Overbeck pottery studio Hannah and her sister, Mary Frances, were primarily responsible for the pottery's decorative designs. Her original design motifs were inspired from nature. She also made hand-formed pottery without the use of a potter's wheel. Chronic neuritis during the final years of her life made it difficult for Hannah to hold a pencil and draw, but she continued to work on designs until her death on August 28, 1931.

=== Elizabeth Overbeck ===
Elizabeth was an art student of her sister, Margaret. During 1909–10 Elizabeth studied ceramics under the direction of Charles Fergus Binns at the New York School for Clayworking (the present-day New York State College of Ceramics at Alfred University) in Alfred, New York.

Elizabeth, the technician of the Overbeck pottery enterprise, was the only one of the sisters to use a potter's wheel to form her pottery. In addition, she formulated and mixed the ceramic glazes, as well as supervising kiln operations. Elizabeth became especially known for her innovative pottery forms and her skills in developing new glazes and ceramic processes. She died on December 1, 1936, leaving her younger sister, Mary Frances, to continue making pottery on her own.

=== Mary Frances Overbeck ===
Mary Frances, along with her sister, Margaret, studied with Arthur Wesley Dow and Marshall Fry. Mary Frances may also have studied at Indiana State Normal School. Trained as an artist in the mediums of oil, watercolor, and pen-and-ink illustration, Mary Frances's specialty was bird paintings. She also became well known for her bookplate designs. Prior to establishing the pottery studio in Cambridge City with her sisters, Mary Frances taught in the public schools at Boulder, Colorado, and at Cambridge City and Centerville, Indiana. Between 1904 and 1916 Mary Frances contributed flower studies that were published in Keramic Studio.

Mary Frances and her sister, Hannah, designed and decorated the Overbeck sisters' pottery. Their primary role was to paint, finish, and decorate the pottery before Elizabeth fired them in the kiln behind their home. Mary Frances's decorations were highly stylized, mostly geometric designs. She also created unique, one-of-a-kind, handmade pottery forms without using a potter's wheel. In addition, she created small figurines of people, animals, and birds. Mary Frances and her sisters also created fanciful, 4-inch (10 cm) to 5-inch (13 cm) figures they called "grotesques." Mary Frances referred to these small, figural caricatures of people and animals as "humor of the kiln." Mary Frances continued to operate Overbeck Pottery after the deaths of her sisters, but she primarily focused on making decorative figurines instead of large ceramic pieces. She died on March 20, 1955.

=== Other Overbeck siblings ===
Harriet Jane Overbeck trained as a musician in Chicago, Illinois; Cincinnati, Ohio; and at Leipzig, Germany. She was also proficient in French, German, and Italian languages. Harriett gave private lessons in music and foreign languages at the family home in Cambridge City in addition to her role as housekeeper for her sisters. She died in 1947.

Ida Alice, the eldest sister, was the only sister to marry. She established a photography studio in Cambridge City around 1890, and married Martin Funk in 1893. Ida was not involved in the Overbeck pottery business. She died in 1946.

Charles Borger Overbeck, the youngest sibling, was a graduate of Purdue University and became an engineer. He died in 1913. Charles and his wife, Hallie, had two children, Virginia and Charles Jr.

== Career ==
The Overbeck sisters established Overbeck Pottery in their home in 1911 with the goal of producing high-quality, hand-wrought ceramics. The women owned and operated the enterprise until 1955, when the last of the sisters died and the pottery closed.

=== Establishing Overbeck Pottery ===
The Overbeck sisters established their ceramic arts studio in their Cambridge City home in 1911, when the Arts and Crafts movement was expanding in the United States. The movement "afforded middle-class women a profession which was considered respectable and a path into the art community at large," and china painting was viewed as an appropriate artistic activity for "genteel women" to pursue. At that time the center of the Arts and Crafts pottery movement in the United States was Cincinnati, Ohio, where the Rookwood Pottery Company, the best-known of the movement's potteries, was established in 1878.

The American potteries employed women workers, but these businesses were usually owned and managed by men. What made the Overbeck sisters unusual was their intention to produce "an entirely American product, untainted by reference to foreign art and decorative arts." Their goal was to produce high-quality, original artwork with motifs inspired by nature. The Overbecks also placed an emphasis on original designs and experimentation in their work. The small pottery enterprise was also the sisters' primary source of income. The frugal women handled the artistic operation and the financial aspects of the business themselves, and as a result of their efforts they made a modest living from the sales of their art and were economically independent.

The Overbecks trained as artists, and Margaret, Hannah, and Mary had additional training as china painters. However, at the time they established their ceramics studio, the women were inexperienced in pottery-making, even though a number of their early designs had been published in Keramic Studio. When Margaret died in 1911, the same year the women established their studio, Elizabeth, Hannah, and Mary Frances carried on the work. The studio operated with division of labor among the sisters. The sisters set up a design studio on the main floor of their home, a ceramics workshop in the basement, and a coal-fired kiln in a small shed behind the house. Elizabeth created the shapes, while Hannah and Mary Frances created the designs and decorated the pottery. The industrious women lived simply and used only basic tools for their artwork. Although Elizabeth made some wheel-thrown pottery, most of their ceramics were handmade using the coil method. The Overbeck Pottery closed in 1955 when Mary Frances died.

=== Art sales and publicity ===
Because their ceramics were handmade pieces, output was modest, as was the income the sisters earned from their work. In addition to the sales made from the showroom at their home/studio in Cambridge City, outside sales came almost exclusively from L. S. Ayres and Company, a department store in Indianapolis, Indiana, and commissions from individual buyers. To supplement earnings from the sales of their art, the sisters taught ceramics classes during the summer in their home at Cambridge City. Elizabeth also taught ceramics classes in Richmond, Indiana. In addition, they gave demonstrations to women's groups around Indiana. They also created and sold their other handiwork, which included furniture, jewelry, knitted goods, tie-dyed fabrics, enameled copper, and lacework.

Growth was slow because they "could afford little advertising." Most of the notoriety for their pottery and distinctive matte glazes came from word-of-mouth publicity, publication of their designs, through exhibitions, and recognition from the awards they received. Keramic Studio publish their designs, as well as the instructions to create them. The sisters regularly exhibited their art at the Indiana State Fair, where they won several prizes. They also won awards for their entries at the Richmond art fair in 1927 and the Indiana Artists Exhibition in Indianapolis in 1928 and 1928. The sisters were also the recipients of an honorable mention at the Robineau Memorial Ceramic Exhibition at Syracuse, New York, in 1934.

=== Artistic techniques ===
As with other artists of the Arts and Crafts movement, the Overbecks strived to produce simple, functional objects that were handmade, beautiful, and inspired by nature. All of the Overbeck Pottery pieces were hand crafted. No mass-produced products or assembly lines were used, and each piece was unique. Their functional pieces, which included teapots, tea sets, pitchers, vases, and bowls, were mostly undecorated except for glazes. The sisters also produced decorative pieces, as well as small figurines and fanciful figures they called "grotesques," which were popular with buyers.

The sisters' designs were Art Nouveau and later, Art Deco styles. They also experimented with glazes, keeping the formulations they used a secret, and destroyed any pieces that did not turn out as they had planned. While the Overbeck sisters have been recognized for their experiments with glazes, especially their early work that included matte glazes in subdued tones, in later years they produced pieces of more modern styles and developed shiny glazes with brighter hues. Robin's-egg blue became a signature color.

The sisters initially used clay from their Jackson Township farm and from the property behind their Cambridge City home. They also obtained clay from Ohio, Virginia, North Carolina, and Delaware. To produce their pottery the sisters' designs were created on paper, transferred to damp clay forms, and decorated and glazed before the final step of firing the pieces in the kiln. Favored motifs were plants, trees, birds, and animals found in the Midwest. Until Elizabeth's death in 1936, the Overbeck sisters marked their pieces with "OBK" and often included the initials of the potter and the decorator: "E" for Elizabeth, "H" for Hannah, and "F" for Mary Frances. After Elizabeth's death, Overbeck pottery was marked with the monogram, either alone or with an "F" or "MF" for Mary Frances.

== Later years ==
While the Overbeck sisters operated their pottery studio in east-central Indiana, their work was exhibited in Paris, France, as well as in the United States, including Chicago, Illinois; Baltimore, Maryland; Detroit, Michigan; Dayton, Ohio; Indianapolis, Indiana. In addition, the sisters were invited to enter pottery pieces in the Panama–Pacific International Exposition in San Francisco, California, in 1915 and the Century of Progress International Exposition in Chicago, Illinois, in 1933.

After the deaths of Margaret, Hannah, and Elizabeth, Mary Frances operated the family pottery business on her own beginning in 1936. She also became sole heir to the Overbeck property upon the deaths of her siblings and parents. Overbeck Pottery closed after Mary Frances's death in 1955.

== Death and legacy ==
Margaret died in 1911; Hannah in 1931; Elizabeth in 1936; and Mary in 1955. The remains of the Overbeck siblings are buried at Riverside Cemetery, Cambridge City, Wayne County, Indiana.

The Overbeck sisters operated their studio at a time when female roles were confined and limited; however, these women managed to become self sufficient and earned a modest living from their art. The sisters' small, home-based studio became "nationally-recognized for its artistic contributions to the Arts and Crafts movement," despite some critics who saw their work "little more than maiden ladies practicing a quant hobby." The family's Cambridge City home/studio was listed on the National Register of Historic Places in 1976. The present-day home is maintained as a private residence.

Ceramics Monthly described the Overbeck women as "fiercely independent," but each had a specialty in producing their ceramics and worked together as a team. As Flora Townsend Little remarked in Art and Archaeology following a visit to their studio in 1923: "'True artists all, their results show much variety and originality of shape, style of decoration, and glazes.'" In a description of an Overbeck vase appearing in Arts and Crafts Quarterly, another author commented, "This pot eloquently testifies to the superb design and execution talents of the Overbeck sisters." Alan Patrick explained in Indiana Arts Insight (1979) that the Overbecks are best known for their small figurines and fanciful "grotesques," as well as their skill in matte glazes and their stylized designs of plants and animals in the Art Nouveau and Art Deco styles. In addition, the Overbeck sisters were praised for the originality they demonstrated in the simple shapes and decorative styles of their pottery.

Examples of the Overbeck sisters' art have been selected for inclusion in exhibitions, including the nationally traveling collections of the General Federation of Women's Clubs, Baltimore Arts and Crafts, and the American Ceramic Society, as well as in Indiana at the Keramic League and Art Association of Richmond in Richmond; the Wayne County Historical Museum; the John Herron Art Institute (the forerunner to the Indianapolis Museum of Art mounted an exhibition of Overbeck work in 2007. Significant collections of Overbeck work is found at the Richmond Art Museum and in the Cambridge City Public Library, whose core collection was a gift of Overbeck scholar Kathleen Postle. The Midwest Museum of American Art in Elkhart, Indiana has a room devoted to Overbeck pottery. In addition, outstanding pieces are found in the collection of the Los Angeles County Museum of Art and other museums and private collections. A collection of Overbeck pottery was featured on the 2006 episode of the Antiques Roadshow from Houston, Texas.

Overbeck pottery is included in museum collections at the Midwest Museum of Art in Elkhart, Indiana; the Museum of Overbeck Art Pottery at the Cambridge City Public Library; the Richmond Art Museum; the Indianapolis Museum of Art; the Metropolitan Museum of Art; the Ball State University Art Gallery; and the American Ceramic Society's museum at its headquarters in suburban Columbus, Ohio. Their art is also in private collections, including one pottery piece given to Franklin and Eleanor Roosevelt. A number of Overbeck oil paintings, mostly of birds, are also known to exist. Overbeck pottery continues to be valued by collectors. Articles related to the Overbeck sisters' art have appeared in magazines such as Antique Week (April 25, 2005) and Today's Collector (October 1994).

== Honors and tributes ==
Elizabeth was elected an honorary fellow of the American Ceramic Society in 1936.

Ball State University hosted a tribute exhibition called "The Overbeck Potters" from December 7, 1975, to January 25, 1976, at its campus art museum in Muncie, Indiana. In 1987–88 Overbeck Pottery was recognized in a Museum of Fine Arts, Boston, exhibition, "The Art That Is Life: The Arts and Crafts Movement in America, 1875-1920." An Overbeck vase was also selected "as an example of originality in early American pottery" in a multi-city traveling exhibition. In 1990 the Los Angeles County Museum of Art included an Overbeck vase in one of their exhibitions. In addition, a small collection of Overbeck pottery was featured on a 2006 episode of Antiques Roadshow from Houston, Texas.

== Public collections ==
Significant public collections of Overbeck works are housed at:

- Midwest Museum of American Art in Elkhart, Indiana
- Overbeck Museum at the Cambridge City Public Library, Cambridge City, Indiana
- Richmond Art Museum, Richmond, Indiana
