= Frank J. Girardin =

American painter

Francois Joseph Girardin (October 6, 1856 – August 7, 1945) was an American impressionist artist who worked in the areas of Cincinnati, Ohio; Richmond, Indiana; and Los Angeles, California. He was also an early player for the Cincinnati Reds baseball team.

Born in Louisville, Kentucky, Girardin came to Cincinnati in the 1870s and studied under Thomas Satterwhite Noble and later Frank Duveneck at the Cincinnati Art Academy. He was best known for his landscape paintings of both Indiana and southern California.

Girardin played an important role in the development of the Art Association of Richmond (now the Richmond Art Museum) was a prominent member of the Richmond Group of artists. He was a member of the board of directors of the Art Association for several years. It was during his time in Indiana that he received the most recognition for his work. He exhibited three paintings in the Indiana building at the St. Louis World's Fair in 1904 and was a member of the Society of Western Artists.

In 1910, Girardin moved to Redondo Beach, California where he painted local landscapes. His paintings are found in the San Diego Museum of Art; the Haan Mansion Museum of Indiana Art, the Richmond Art Museum; the Art Museum of Greater Lafayette; Morrisson-Reeves Library; Kokomo-Howard County Public Library; Connersville, Indiana Public Library and the Wayne County (Indiana) Historical Museum.

Girardin died in Redondo Beach on August 7, 1945, and was buried there.

== Sources ==
- Burnet, Mary Quick (1921). Art and Artists of Indiana. New York: The Century Company – via Internet Archive.
