= Cambridge City, Indiana =

- Town
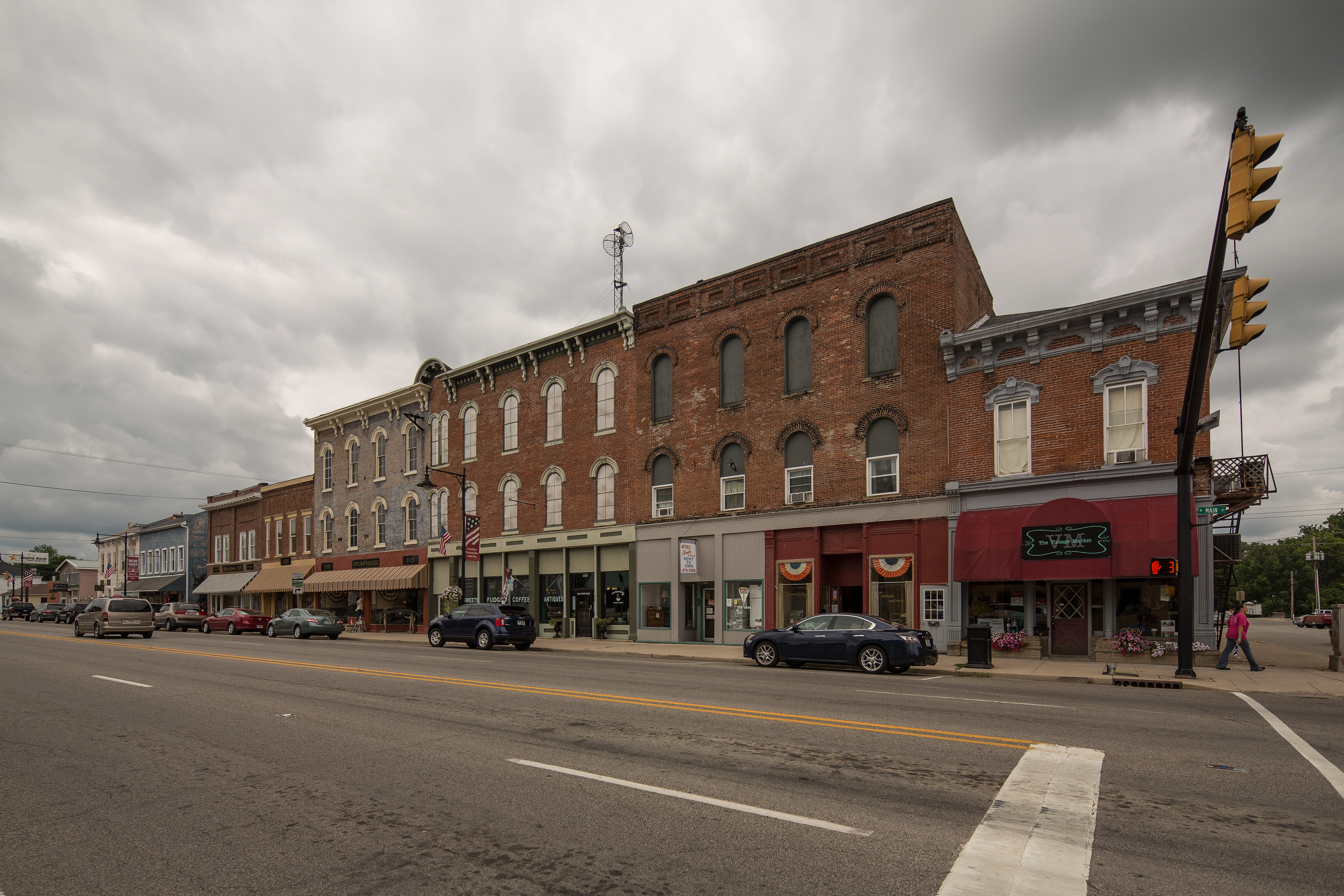

- Logo

- Location of Cambridge City in Wayne County, Indiana.
- Coordinates: 39°48′45″N 85°10′13″W
- Country: United States
- State: Indiana
- County: Wayne
- Township: Jackson

Area
  - Total: 1.02 sq mi (2.63 km^{2})
  - Land: 1.01 sq mi (2.61 km^{2})
  - Water: 0.0077 sq mi (0.02 km^{2})
- Elevation: 932 ft (284 m)

Population (2020)
  - Total: 1,751
  - Density: 1,735.1/sq mi (669.92/km^{2})
- Time zone: UTC-5 (Eastern (EST))
  - Summer (DST): UTC-5 (EST)
- ZIP code: 47327
- Area code: 765
- FIPS code: 18-09874
- GNIS feature ID: 2396623
- Website: www.cambridgecity.in.gov

Cambridge City is a town in Jackson Township, Wayne County, in the U.S. state of Indiana. As of the 2020 census, Cambridge City had a population of 1,751.

== History ==
Cambridge City was laid out and platted in 1836. The community was named after the city of Cambridge, in England.

The Cambridge City post office has been in operation since 1835.

Cambridge City experienced growth when the Whitewater Canal was extended to that point in 1846.

Situated along the historic National Road (U.S. Route 40), Cambridge City is currently a prominent destination for antique seekers.

The Cambridge City Historic District, Conklin-Montgomery House, and Lackey-Overbeck House are listed on the National Register of Historic Places.

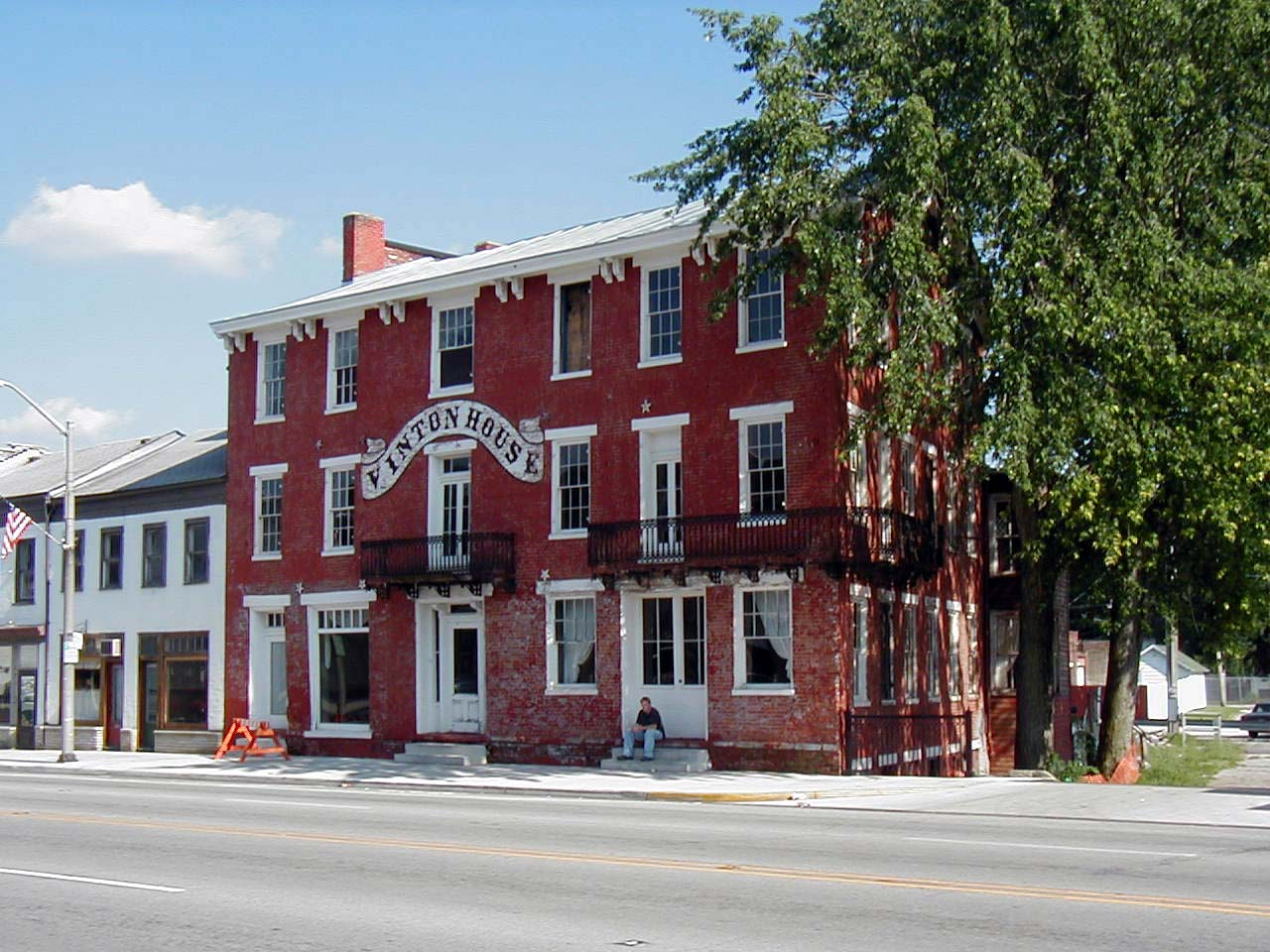
Vinton House, a historic inn on the Whitewater Canal

== Geography ==
According to the 2010 census, Cambridge City has a total area of 1.02 square miles (2.64 km^{2}), of which 1.01 square miles (2.62 km^{2}) (or 99.02%) is land and 0.01 square miles (0.03 km^{2}) (or 0.98%) is water.

== Demographics ==
Historical population
Census	Pop.	Note	%±
1850	1,217		—
1860	1,622		33.3%
1870	2,162		33.3%
1880	2,370		9.6%
1890	1,782		−24.8%
1900	1,754		−1.6%
1910	2,237		27.5%
1920	1,963		−12.2%
1930	2,113		7.6%
1940	2,207		4.4%
1950	2,559		15.9%
1960	2,569		0.4%
1970	2,481		−3.4%
1980	2,407		−3.0%
1990	2,091		−13.1%
2000	2,121		1.4%
2010	1,870		−11.8%
2020	1,751		−6.4%
U.S. Decennial Census

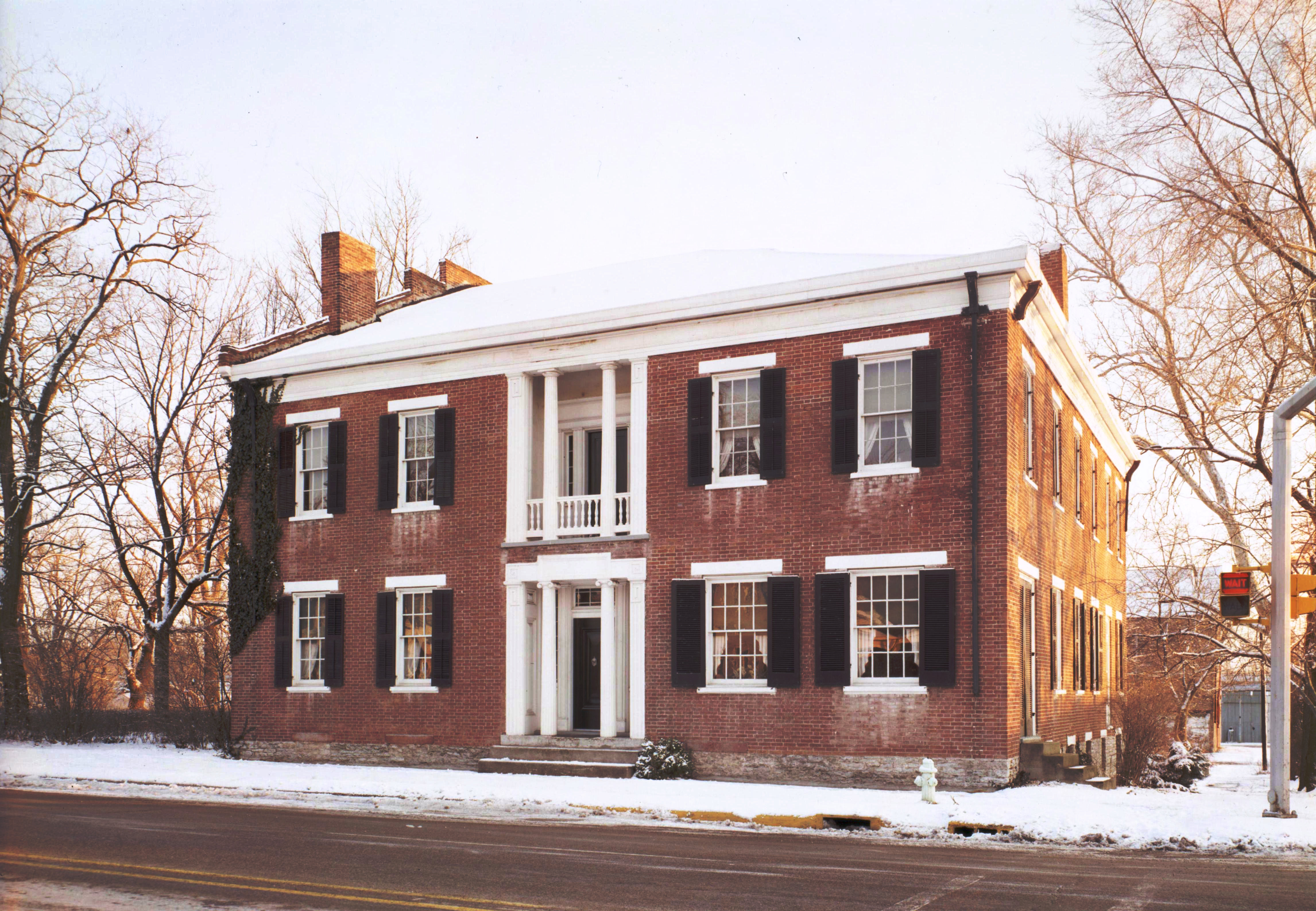
The Conklin-Montgomery House

=== 2020 census ===
As of the 2020 census, Cambridge City had a population of 1,751. The median age was 42.2 years. 22.7% of residents were under the age of 18 and 19.2% of residents were 65 years of age or older. For every 100 females, there were 91.6 males, and for every 100 females age 18 and over, there were 88.8 males age 18 and over.

0.0% of residents lived in urban areas, while 100.0% lived in rural areas.

There were 753 households in Cambridge City, of which 30.7% had children under the age of 18 living in them. Of all households, 39.4% were married-couple households, 19.1% were households with a male householder and no spouse or partner present, and 30.5% were households with a female householder and no spouse or partner present. About 29.6% of all households were made up of individuals, and 13.9% had someone living alone who was 65 years of age or older.

There were 862 housing units, of which 12.6% were vacant. The homeowner vacancy rate was 4.1% and the rental vacancy rate was 6.7%.

Racial composition as of the 2020 census
Race	Number	Percent
White	1,639	93.6%
Black or African American	8	0.5%
American Indian and Alaska Native	6	0.3%
Asian	6	0.3%
Native Hawaiian and Other Pacific Islander	0	0.0%
Some other race	14	0.8%
Two or more races	78	4.5%
Hispanic or Latino (of any race)	28	1.6%

=== 2010 census ===
As of the census of 2010, there were 1,870 people, 785 households, and 514 families living in the town. The population density was 1,851.5 inhabitants per square mile (714.9/km^{2}). There were 893 housing units at an average density of 884.2 per square mile (341.4/km^{2}). The racial makeup of the town was 98.5% White, 0.2% African American, 0.5% Native American, 0.3% Asian, 0.1% from other races, and 0.5% from two or more races. Hispanic or Latino of any race were 0.9% of the population.

There were 785 households, of which 33.5% had children under the age of 18 living with them, 45.1% were married couples living together, 14.6% had a female householder with no husband present, 5.7% had a male householder with no wife present, and 34.5% were non-families. 29.2% of all households were made up of individuals, and 12.6% had someone living alone who was 65 years of age or older. The average household size was 2.38 and the average family size was 2.90.

The median age in the town was 39.8 years. 24.5% of residents were under the age of 18; 7.6% were between the ages of 18 and 24; 24.8% were from 25 to 44; 26% were from 45 to 64; and 17% were 65 years of age or older. The gender makeup of the town was 48.8% male and 51.2% female.

=== 2000 census ===
As of the census of 2000, there were 2,121 people, 904 households, and 602 families living in the town. The population density was 2,030.6 inhabitants per square mile (784.0/km^{2}). There were 956 housing units at an average density of 915.3 per square mile (353.4/km^{2}). The racial makeup of the town was 99.34% White, 0.33% African American, 0.09% Asian, 0.05% Pacific Islander, 0.14% from other races, and 0.05% from two or more races. Hispanic or Latino of any race were 1.04% of the population.

There were 904 households, out of which 29.0% had children under the age of 18 living with them, 49.2% were married couples living together, 13.1% had a female householder with no husband present, and 33.3% were non-families. 29.6% of all households were made up of individuals, and 16.6% had someone living alone who was 65 years of age or older. The average household size was 2.35 and the average family size was 2.85.

In the town, the population was spread out, with 23.8% under the age of 18, 9.4% from 18 to 24, 26.2% from 25 to 44, 21.5% from 45 to 64, and 19.1% who were 65 years of age or older. The median age was 38 years. For every 100 females, there were 88.0 males. For every 100 females age 18 and over, there were 86.4 males.

The median income for a household in the town was $33,750, and the median income for a family was $41,731. Males had a median income of $35,602 versus $23,100 for females. The per capita income for the town was $17,691. About 6.9% of families and 8.6% of the population were below the poverty line, including 14.4% of those under age 18 and 7.0% of those age 65 or over.

== Culture ==
The town celebrates its history and heritage during the second weekend in each September during the annual Canal Days festival, which commemorates the importance of the Whitewater Canal to the formation and growth of Cambridge City in the 19th century.

== Education ==
Cambridge City has two schools: an elementary school and a middle/high school that serve the surrounding areas.

- Western Wayne Elementary School
- Lincoln Middle/High School

The town has a lending library, the Cambridge City Public Library.

== Economy ==
Just south of I-70, Cambridge City is home to the Indiana Gateway Industrial Park which is home to Taconic Biosciences, Dot Foods and Sugar Creek Packaging Co.

== Notable people ==
- Alice Williams Brotherton (1848–1930), writer
- Larry Crockett (1926–1955), Indy car driver
- Edward Wilson Davis (1888–1973), engineer and inventor best known for engineering the process to create taconite pellets
- Arthur Ernest Guedel (1883–1956), anesthesiologist
- Solomon Meredith (1810–1875), a Quaker general in the American Civil War
- Virginia Claypool Meredith (1848–1936), "Queen of American Agriculture"; ran a farm in Cambridge City
- The Overbeck Sisters – four daughters of John and Sarah Overpeck who hand-produced their internationally known Overbeck Art Pottery in Cambridge City from 1911 to 1955

== See also ==
- Whitewater Canal
