= Richmond Group =

Artist collective

The Richmond Group, also known as the Richmond School, is a collective of American Impressionist painters who worked in the Richmond, Indiana, area from the late 19th century through the mid-20th century. Although the Richmond Group lacked a formal organization, many of the artists were affiliated with and exhibited at the Art Association of Richmond, Indiana, now known as the Richmond Art Museum.

Though not definitive, the following is a list of artists considered a part of the Richmond Group:

- George Herbert Baker
- John Elwood Bundy
- Francis Focer Brown
- Charles H. Clawson
- Albert Clinton Conner
- Charles Conner
- Maude Kaufman Eggemeyer
- W. A. Eyden Sr.
- William A. Eyden Jr.
- Edgar Forkner
- Frank J. Girardin
- Albert W. Gregg
- William A. Holly
- Lawrence McConaha
- Ellwood Morris
- Alden Mote
- Anna M. Newman
- Micajah Thomas Nordyke
- Fred Pearce Jr.
- Fred Pearce Sr.
- John Albert Seaford

== See also ==
- Hoosier Group
- Irvington Group
- Richmond Art Museum
