= Haan Mansion Museum of Indiana Art =

Art museum in Lafayette, Indiana, US

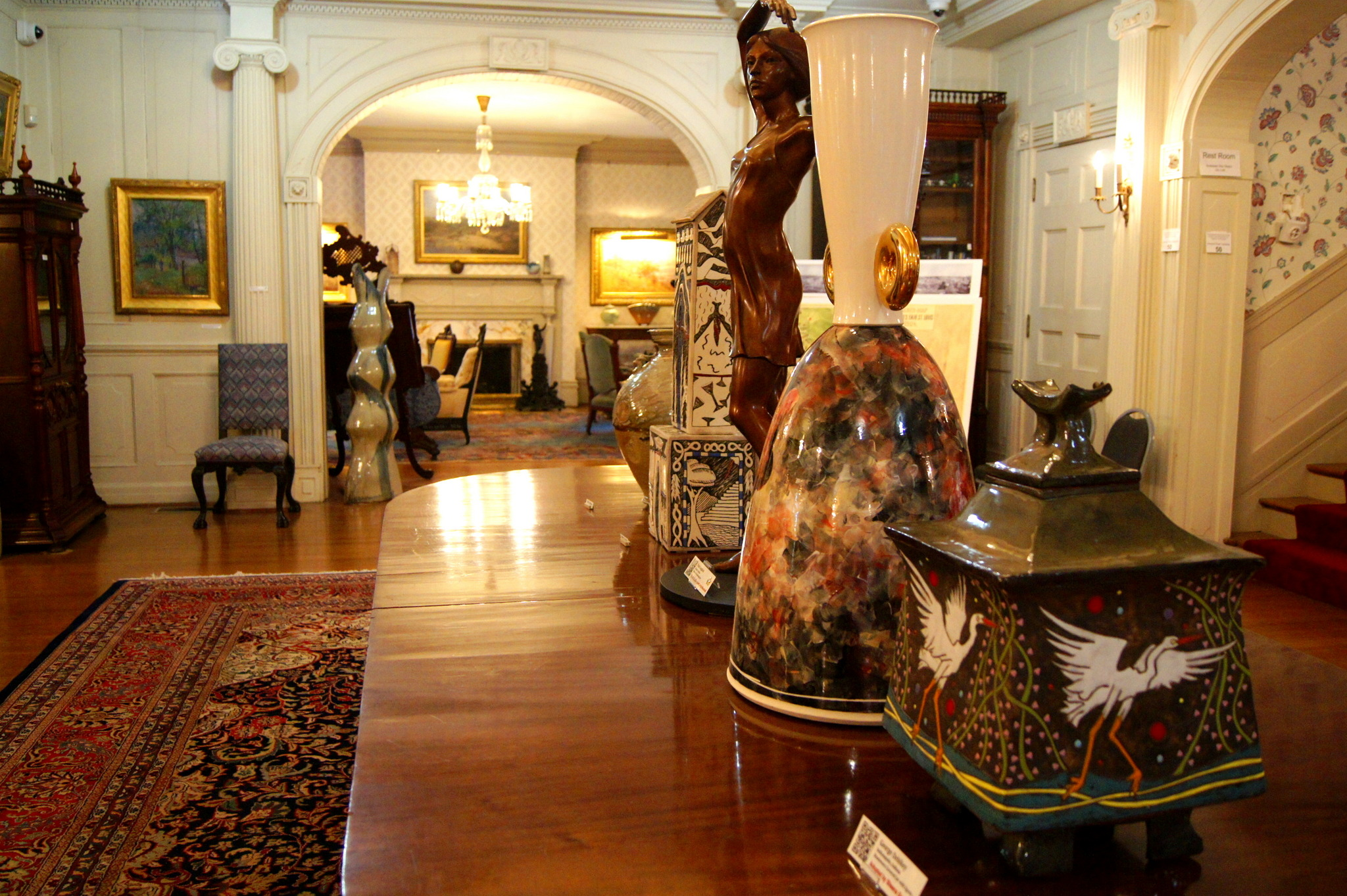
- A view of main hall and drawing room at Haan Mansion Museum of Indiana Art
- Established: 2013
- Location: 920 E. State Street, Lafayette, Indiana, US, 47905 (765) 742-6449
- Coordinates: 40.4128°N 86.8851°W
- Type: Art museum
- Website: haanmuseum.org

The Haan Mansion Museum of Indiana Art is a public museum in Lafayette, Indiana, housing the largest collection of Indiana art anywhere in the world. The museum is located in the Potter-Haan Mansion at 920 E State Street. The museum's collection includes over 100 paintings by Hoosier Group, Indiana Regionalism artists as well as ceramics, antique furniture and decorative items. The museum is a member of American Alliance of Museums.

The museum is based on the private collection of Robert (Bob) and Ellen (Ellie) Haan, the founders and former owners of Haan Crafts Corporation.

== History ==
The Haans bought the mansion in 1984 and started collecting Indiana art in 1992. The formation of the Haan Mansion Museum of Indiana Art was announced in September 2013 when it also opened for monthly public tours. Bob and Ellie Haan signed over the building to the Haan Mansion Museum of Indiana Art in July 2015.

== Architecture ==
The Potter-Haan mansion is a Colonial Revival building designed by the architect Edward T. Hapgood. The mansion was built in 1904 by Wales Lines Co of Meriden, CT for $30,000 and used as the Connecticut Building at the St. Louis World's Fair, and moved to Lafayette, Indiana, at the end of the fair. The front door and entry way as well as interior architectural features were taken from the 1760 Hubbard Slater Mansion and incorporated in the design of the Connecticut Building. Columns and pilasters with ionic capitals are features in the Great Hall, and two of the most outstanding architectural features of the mansion are the open well with a 26 light brass and crystal chandelier in the opening and a double staircase leading to the second floor.

== Collections ==
Suzanne in The Garden (1904) by Otto Stark

The museum has the largest collection of Hoosier Group paintings anywhere in the world. This includes works by all five of the group's members TC Steele, Richard Gruelle, William Forsyth, J. Ottis Adams and Otto Stark. Two still lifes by William Merritt Chase are part of the collection.

Many artists from Brown County Art Colony are represented in Haans' collection, including Ada Walter Shulz.

== Exhibitions ==
Over 60 paintings by Indiana's most important historic artists are on permanent display at all times, as well as works by Indiana's most important historic and contemporary ceramic artists. The mansion is furnished in important large scale American antiques focusing on the period 1860 to 1890. A superior grade Wooton desk and massive Thomas Brooks pier mirror are just two of the outstanding pieces of furniture. A Swiss made cylindrical music box featuring drums, bells, castanets, organ and flute sections is one of the highlights of the museum. The Weller Pottery Company had five monumental vases at the St. Louis World's Fair, and the Haan Museum has the three largest, including the seven foot tall Weller vase that won a Gold Medal for the Arts at the Fair.

A sculpture garden on the grounds features 25 works in bronze, ceramics, steel, stone and glass by Indiana sculptors. The sculptures are displayed in a rolling setting along a wheelchair accessible path with native Indiana plants accenting the trail. Within the Sculpture Garden is a Theater Garden and stage (under construction) used for outdoor performances. A somewhat rugged mile long nature trail featuring 30 native Indiana trees is also an important attraction at the museum. The Sculpture Garden and Nature Trail are open and free to the public every day during daylight hours.

In the summer of 2011, the Indiana State Museum hosted the "Indiana Realities" exhibition, a major show of Indiana paintings from the 1930s and 40s based solely on the works from Haans' collection.

From September to November 2016, the museum hosted its first temporary exhibit “Jim Davis: An Indiana Legend”, dedicated to Hoosier native cartoonist Jim Davis, the creator of Garfield.

In October 2014 the museum hosted the Indiana Ceramics Celebration, exhibiting about 500 pieces by Indiana ceramic artists, including Laura Anne Fry, Marvin Bartel, Mark Goertzen, John Goodheart, Richard Tuck and Alan Patrick.

In April through early July 2017, the museum exhibited "100 Cups: One Artist's Journey" by Julia Livingston.

== Outreach ==
The museum hosts regular guided tours of its collection and guided nature walks. Music concerts are held at the museum lawn during summer months.
