= John Elwood Bundy =

American artist

John Elwood Bundy (May 1, 1853 – January 17, 1933) was an American Impressionist painter known as the "dean" of the Richmond Group of painters in the late 19th and early 20th centuries.

Bundy was born to a Quaker family in Guilford County, North Carolina, and moved by covered wagon to a farm near Monrovia, Indiana, with his family when he was five. He studied briefly in Indianapolis with Barton S. Hays but was primarily self-taught. Bundy traveled to New York to copy paintings at the Metropolitan Museum of Art for a time. He joined the art department of Earlham College in 1887 and took up painting full-time in 1895 from a studio behind his home on West Main Street in Richmond, Indiana. He was a founding member of the Society of Western Artists and was a central influence in the founding of the Richmond Art Museum in 1898. He was known for his portrayal of Indiana landscapes and particularly for his paintings of American beech trees, though he did make brief trips to paint in California and northern Michigan.

Bundy's work continues to be sought after and is found in numerous private collections and museums, including the Haan Mansion Museum of Indiana Art, the Indianapolis Museum of Art, the Indiana State Museum, and the Richmond Art Museum.
