= Richmond Art Museum =

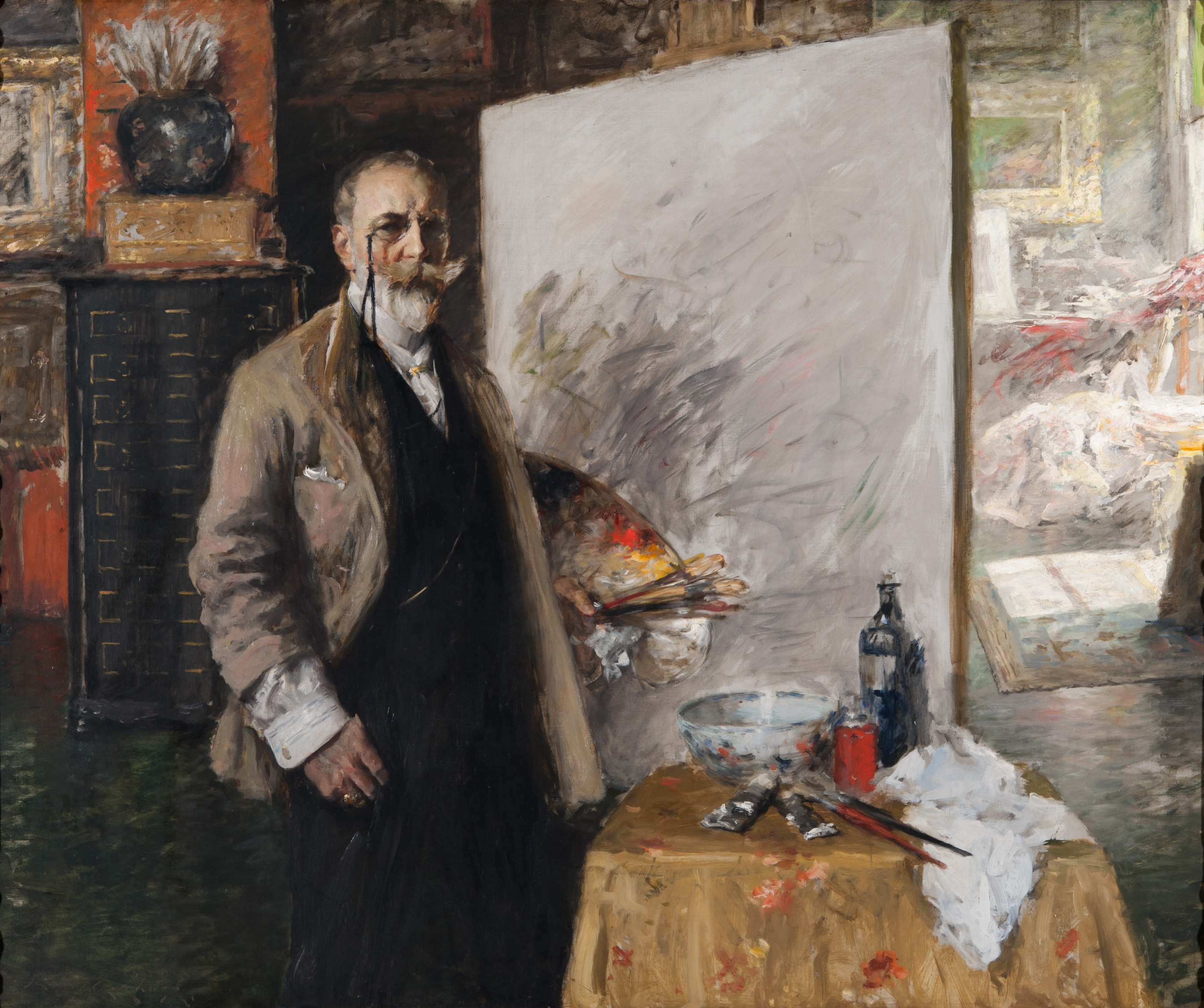
- Self Portrait of William Merritt Chase (1915) from the collection of the Richmond Art Museum
- Established: 1898
- Location: 350 Hub Etchison Parkway; Richmond, Indiana
- Coordinates: 39.8234°N 84.9016°W
- Type: Art Museum
- Website: richmondartmuseum.org

The Richmond Art Museum was founded in 1898 as the Art Association of Richmond, Indiana. Artist John Elwood Bundy and author and attorney William Dudley Foulke were instrumental in the founding.

Ella Bond Johnston served as president of the Richmond Art Association from 1899 through 1915.

== Permanent collection ==
Its collection includes important works of American Impressionists, particularly from the Hoosier Group, the Richmond Group and the Taos School. Important ceramics including a significant collection of the work of the Overbeck Sisters are part of the collection housed in McGuire Memorial Hall at Richmond High School. The museum is believed to be the only public art museum connected with a public high school. An icon of the collection is a very large self-portrait of the American impressionist William Merritt Chase painted for the museum in 1915–16.

Some of the more important artists represented in the collection are:

- William Merritt Chase
- Frank Duveneck
- Henry Mosler
- Walter Shirlaw
- William Aiken Walker
- William Wendt
- Charles Courtney Curran
- William Victor Higgins
- Ben Foster
- Robert Reid
- Asher Durand
- Childe Hassam
- Adam Emory Albright
- E. Irving Couse
- Leonard Ochtman
- John Christen Johansen
- Francis Focer Brown
- Guy Carleton Wiggins
- Jane Peterson
- Janet Scudder
- Paul Weber
- Harry Mills Walcott
- Albert Lorey Groll
- Gordon Grant
- Louis Betts
- De Scott Evans
- Marcus Mote
- Frederick Judd Waugh
- Wayman Elbridge Adams
- Aminah Robinson
- Johann Berthelsen
