= T. C. Steele State Historic Site =

- Theodore Clement Steele House and Studio
- U.S. National Register of Historic Places
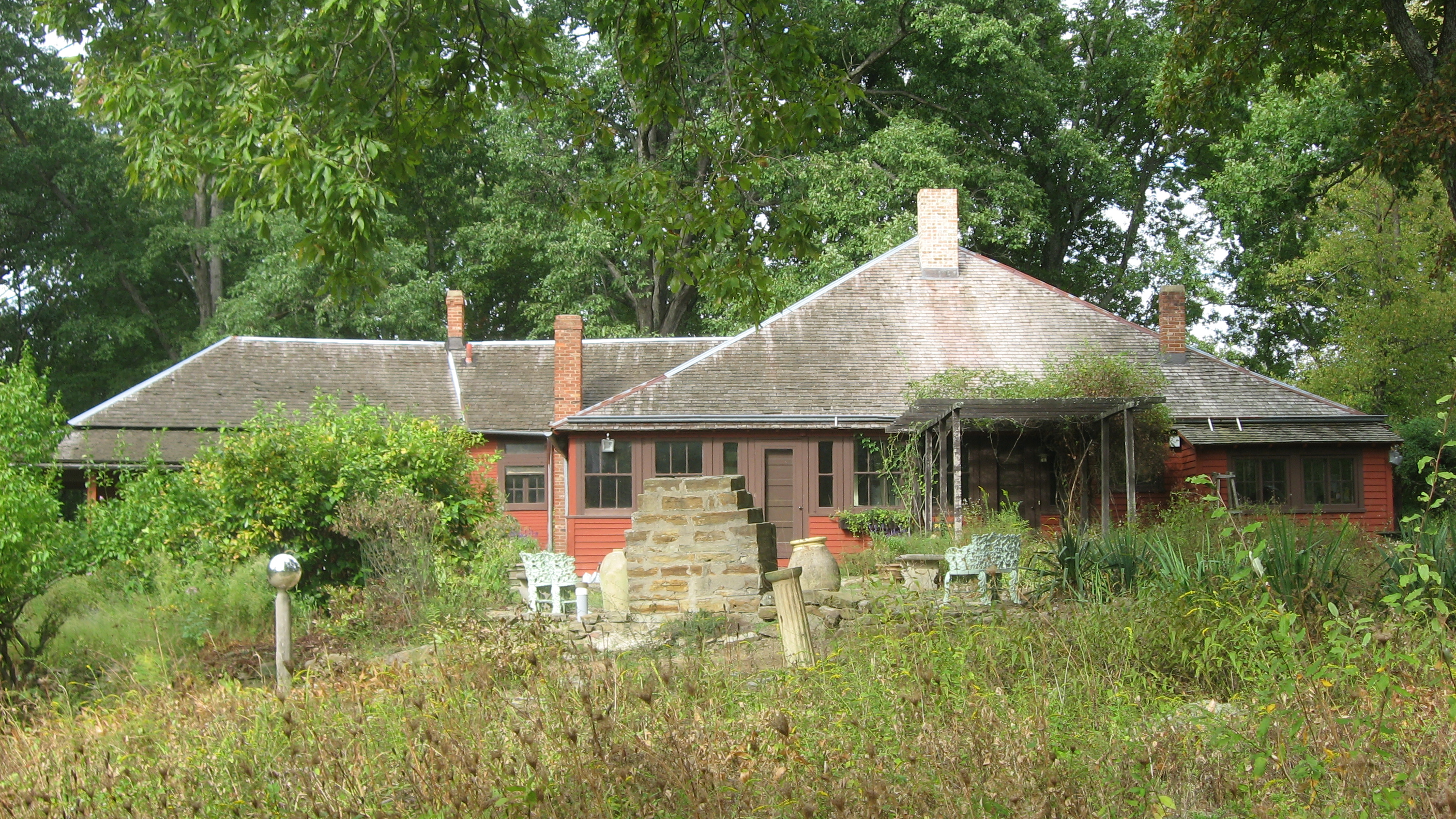
- T.C. Steele House, September 2010

- Location within Brown County, Indiana Location within Indiana Location within the United States
- Location: Southwest of Nashville off State Road 46, Washington Township, Brown County, Indiana
- Coordinates: 39°07′50″N 86°20′19″W
- Area: 211 acres (85 ha)
- Built: 1907
- Built by: Steele, T.C.
- NRHP reference No.: 73000029
- Added to NRHP: October 2, 1973

The T. C. Steele State Historic Site (also called the Theodore Clement Steele House and Studio, and named the House of the Singing Winds by its original owners) is located in rural Brown County, Indiana, one and a half miles south of Belmont, between Bloomington and Nashville, Indiana. The property was the studio and home of Hoosier Group landscape and portrait artist Theodore Clement Steele (1847–1926) and Selma Neubacher Steele (1870–1945), the artist's second wife. Shortly before her death in 1945, Selma donated the property on 211 acres (85 hectares) of land to the Indiana Department of Conservation (the present-day Indiana Department of Natural Resources) to establish a state historic site in memory of her husband. The property was listed on the National Register of Historic Places in 1973 as the Theodore Clement Steele House and Studio. The Indiana State Museum operates the historic site, which is open to the public and offers guided tours of the home and studio.

== History ==
=== The artist ===
Theodore Clement Steele (1847–1926) was a member of the famous Hoosier Group of American regional impressionist painters that also included William Forsyth, J. Ottis Adams, Richard B. Gruelle, and Otto Stark. Born in Owen County, Indiana, Steele began studying art at an early age. He attended Waveland Collegiate Institute in Montgomery County, Indiana, and briefly studied painting in Chicago and Cincinnati before moving to Indianapolis to become a portrait painter. Steele spent five years (1880–85) studying art at the Academy of Fine Arts, Munich, before returning to Indianapolis to resume his career. Although Steele made his living painting portraits, he is best known for his landscapes.

Steele was elected an Associate Artist to the National Academy of Design in New York City in 1913, confirming his standing as the most famous Hoosier artist of his time. Steele was also a former president of the Society of Western Artists. Steele's work has been exhibited across the United States. Three of his paintings were accepted into the prestigious Panama–Pacific International Exposition in San Francisco, California, in 1915. In 1916 Steele was awarded an honorary doctorate from Indiana University.

=== Studio and home ===
Around 1905–06, while Steele was exploring new landscapes to paint, he discovered a scenic and isolated area of Brown County, Indiana. In 1907 he purchased 60 acres (24 hectares) of land approximately one and a half miles south of Belmont, between Bloomington and Nashville, Indiana, and had a hilltop studio and home built on the property. Steele moved into the new summer residence with Selma Neubacher Steele, his second wife, in August 1907.

Steele and his wife developed the property slowly, over time. In 1911 they purchased additional acreage to increase their property to 211 acres (85 hectares) of land, and made further improvements that included an enlarged home surrounded by beautiful gardens, a barn-sized studio and art gallery, and several other outbuildings. The site became their year-round residence in 1912. Although the property in rural Brown County remained Steele's primary residence, he maintained a studio in Indianapolis. Beginning in 1922, when Steele was named IU's artist-in-residence, he also maintained a winter home in Bloomington and a studio on the school's campus.

Following Steele's death in 1926, Selma and her sister, Edith Newbacher, continued to reside on the Brown County property, but they struggled financially. Selma managed the artist's studio, rented out cabins on the property, and sold farm produce and her husband's paintings to earn cash. Selma also established a small museum in a log cabin that she had moved to the property and charged admission for studio tours.

In July 1945 Selma donated the Brown County property of more than 200 acres (81 hectares) to the Indiana Department of Conservation (the present-day Indiana Department of Natural Resources) to establish the historic site in her husband's honor. The property included the house, its furnishings and decorative arts, a large studio, other outbuildings and structures, and more than 300 of her husband's paintings. The site was listed on the National Register of Historic Places in 1973 as the Theodore Clement Steele House and Studio.

=== State historic site ===
The T. C. Steele State Historic Site, the property's present-day name, offers visitors guided tours of the home and large studio. It is open to the public, Wednesday through Sunday from 10 a.m. to 5 p.m. The 211-acre property includes several structures, landscaped grounds and gardens, five hiking trails, and a nature preserve.

== Description ==
=== Home ===
Inspired by the breezes blowing through the cottage's screened porches, T. C. and Selma Steele named their Brown County home the House of the Singing Winds. The home originates from 1907, but it was enlarged in 1908 to include a west wing that served as an art studio. (Steele's first studio on the site was established in the home's present-day living room.) Steele used the studio in the west wing for seven years. Before the large, barn-like studio was built in 1916, he also worked in another outbuilding on the property.

The vernacular-style home has high ceilings, screened porches, a pyramid-shaped roof, and a central fireplace. Selma Steele decorated the home's interior in an eclectic mix of styles that included Arts and Crafts and Rococo Revival. Gustave Baumann, an artist friend, carved an old Gaelic saying below the fireplace mantle: "Every morning I take off my hat to the beauty of the world."

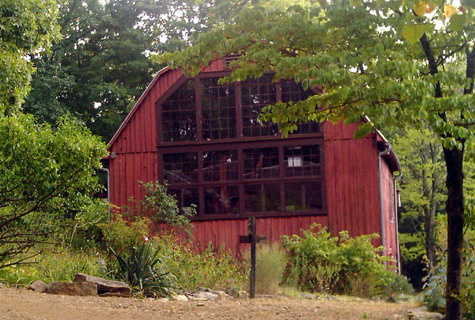
T. C. Steele State Historic Site, Large studio

=== Large studio ===
The large, barn-like studio was built in 1916. Because Steele was primarily a plein-air painter, it served as a gallery to exhibit and sell Steele's works of art. Painted a dark red color, the building measures 30 feet (9.1 m) by 50 feet (15 m) and contains a wall of windows on its north side. The studio continues to display examples of Steele's art.

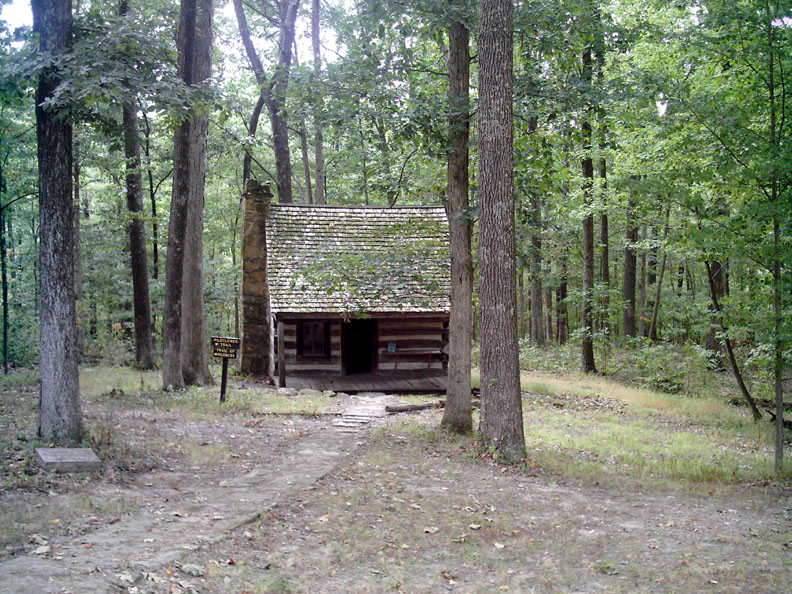
The Dewar log cabin

=== Dewar log cabin ===
Peter Dewar, a Scottish immigrant who settled in Brown County, built the two-story log cabin around 1875 at another location as a wedding gift to his son. In order to save the historic cabin from demolition, Selma had it relocated to the Steele property in the early 1930s, where it became known as the Trailside Museum. She dedicated the small museum in 1934 to the memory of Walter Neubacher, one of her brothers.

=== Other structures ===
One of two temporary studios that T. C. Steele had erected on the property in 1911, has been reconstructed. The Steeles also had guest houses erected on the property to house visitors.

=== Gravesites ===
The remains of T. C. Steele, his wife, Selma, and members of her family are buried in a family cemetery, known as the T. C. Steele Memorial Cemetery, on the property near Belmont.

=== Grounds and gardens ===
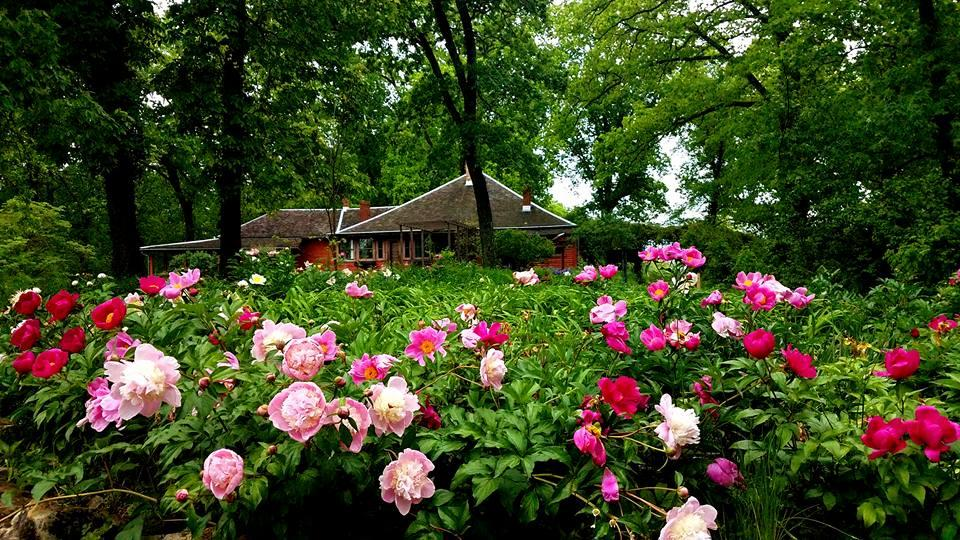
T. C. Steele State Historic Site in bloom

The land, while not suitable for agricultural purpose, provided Steele with "beautiful picturesque woods and hills and valleys." Selma Steele managed the property while her husband focused on painting. She also supervised the gradual development of its landscaped grounds, which included the introduction of new trees, shrubs, and masses of flowers to the hilltop property. It was especially known for the daffodils that covered the hillsides in the spring.

The present-day grounds feature lily ponds, hillside and perennial gardens, and a formal garden. The site also has five hiking trails: the Trail of Silences, Wildflower Trail, Whippoorwill Haunt Trail, Peckerwood Trail, and Inspiration Ridge Trail. The Selma Steele Nature Preserve on 92 acres (37 hectares) of land within the grounds of the state historic site was dedicated in 1990.
