= Otto Stark =

American painter (1859–1926)

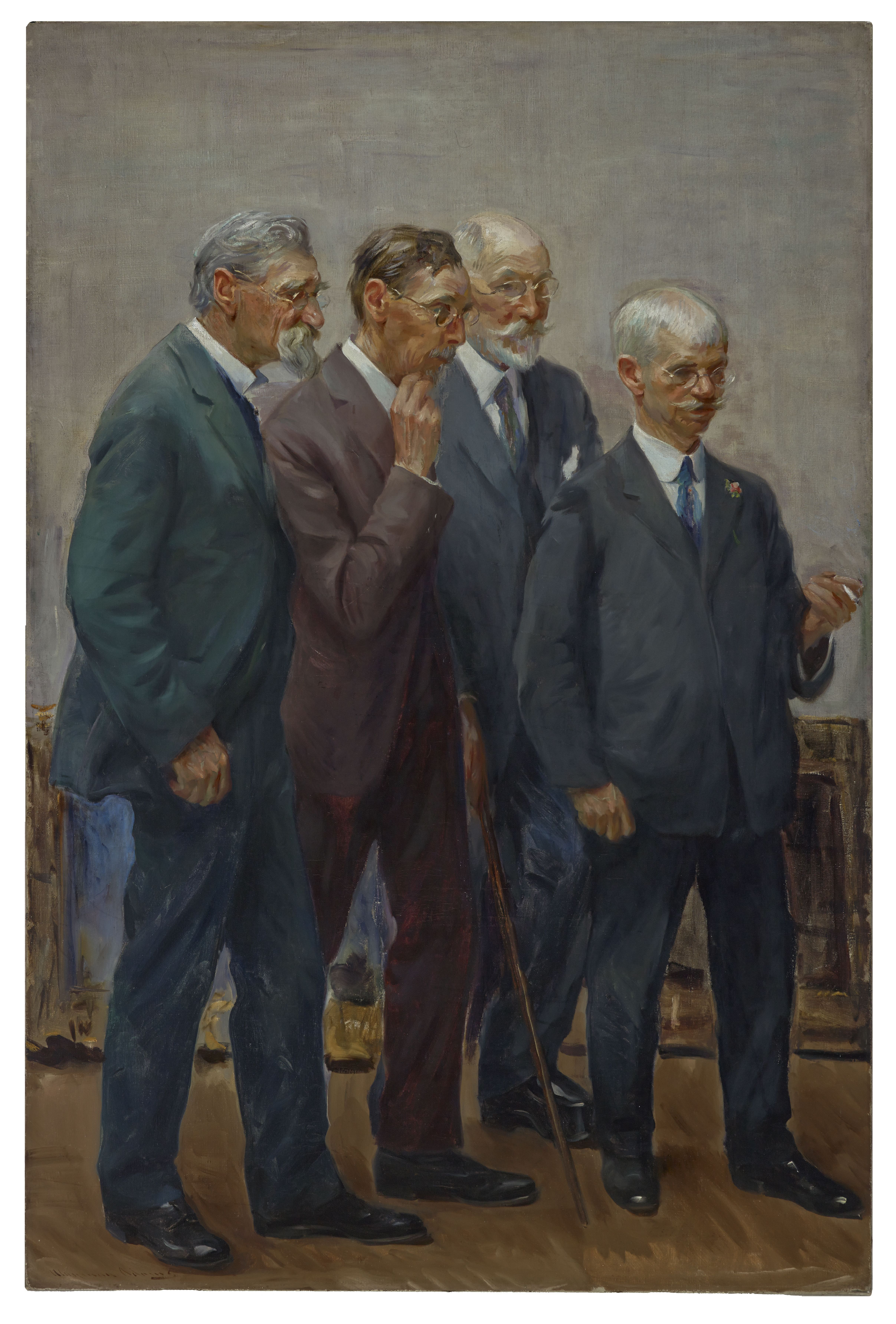
- Stark, pictured second from the left, in "The Art Jury" by Wayman Elbridge Adams (Painting in the collection of the Indianapolis Museum of Art)
- Born: Otto Stark; January 29, 1859; Indianapolis, Indiana, United States
- Died: April 14, 1926 (aged 67); Indianapolis, Indiana, United States
- Resting place: Crown Hill Cemetery and Arboretum, Section 62, Niche Lot 103; Landmark 39.8237353°N 86.169721°W
- Education: Art Academy of Cincinnati; Art Students League of New York; Académie Julien, Paris
- Known for: Painting
- Movement: American Impressionism

Otto Stark (January 29, 1859 – April 14, 1926) was an American Impressionist painter, muralist, commercial artist, printmaker, and illustrator from Indianapolis, Indiana, who is best known as one of the five Hoosier Group artists. Stark's work clearly showed the influence of Impressionism, and he often featured children in his work. To provide a sufficient income for his family, Stark worked full time as supervisor of art at Emmerich Manual High School in Indianapolis from 1899 to his retirement in 1919, and as part-time art instructor on the faculty of the John Herron Art Institute from 1905 to 1919. Stark frequently exhibited his paintings at international, national, regional, and local exhibitions, including the Paris Salon of 1886 and 1887; the Five Hoosier Painters exhibition (1894) in Chicago, Illinois; the Trans-Mississippi Exposition (1898) in Omaha, Nebraska; the Louisiana Purchase Exposition (1904) in Saint Louis, Missouri; and international expositions (1910) in Buenos Aires, Argentina, and Santiago, Chile. He also supervised the Indiana exhibition at the Panama-Pacific International Exhibition (1915) in San Francisco, California. Stark remained an active artist and member of the Indianapolis arts community until his death in 1926.

Stark began his career in the mid-1870s as a lithographer in Cincinnati, Ohio, and attended evening classes at the Cincinnati Art Academy. Beginning in 1888, after completing his formal art training in New York City at the Art Students League of New York, where he studied with William Merritt Chase, among others, and at the Académie Julian in Paris, France, Stark worked as a lithographer, commercial artist, and illustrator in New York City and in Philadelphia, Pennsylvania. He returned to the Midwest after the death of his French wife, Marie, in 1891, and worked as a lithographer in Cincinnati until 189, when he established his home and studio in Indianapolis. Stark raised his four children in Indianapolis and continued his career there as a painter and art educator for the remainder of his life.

== Early life and education ==
Otto Stark was born on January 29, 1859, in Indianapolis, Indiana, to Gustavus Godfrey, a cabinetmaker, and Leone Joas Stark. Otto Stark's paternal grandparents, Christian and Christian Schmidt Stark, had immigrated to Indiana in 1842. Stark, the oldest of the family's seven children, was described as a "sober and intense child."

Although Stark aspired to be an organ builder, he began training for a career in lithography in 1875 while still a teen. Stark received an early education at private schools in Indianapolis before beginning an apprenticeship to a Cincinnati, Ohio, lithographer at the age of sixteen. In 1877, while living with an aunt and uncle in Cincinnati, Stark began art school during the evenings at the Art Academy of Cincinnati, a department of the University of Cincinnati. His first public exhibition occurred in June 1878 at the School of Design's Tenth Annual Exhibition when he was nineteen years old. Stark's entry for the exhibition was Musical Faun, a classical drawing.

Stark moved to New York City in 1879 to continue his art studies at the Art Students League of New York, and supported himself as a lithographer. Stark studied at the Art Students League under William Merritt Chase, James Carroll Beckwith, and Thomas Dewing, among others. During these early years Stark also exhibited his work, including Street Arab at an annual exhibition at the National Academy of Design in New York City, and On the White River at Indianapolis at an annual exhibition of the American Watercolor Society.

In 1885, at the age of twenty-six, Stark enrolled at Académie Julien in Paris, France, where he studied under Gustave Boulanger and Jules-Joseph Lefebvre for three years. Stark also studied in the Paris atelier of Fernand Corman. Although Stark was trained in the traditional academics of art, he experimented with Impressionism, a new style at that time. Stark's Que Vient? (Who Comes?) was selected for the Paris Salon of 1886, and Le Soir (Evening) was selected for the Paris Salon of 1887. He returned to the United States in 1887 to begin his career as a commercial artist in New York City.

== Marriage and family ==
Stark married Marie Nitscheim on December 15, 1886, while he was an art student in France. They later became the parents of four children: two daughters, Gretchen Leone and Suzanne Marie, and two sons, Paul Gustav and Edward Otto. Marie Stark died in New York City on November 11, 1891, leaving Stark a widower with four children to raise on his own.

In late 1891 Stark moved his four children to Indianapolis, Indiana, so that his sister, Augusta, and his widowed father could help raise them. Stark initially worked in Cincinnati, Ohio, but returned to live in Indianapolis in 1893. Stark and his four children established a home in Indianapolis with his unmarried sister, Lydia, and his widowed sister, Amalie "Molly", and her two daughters.

In 1905 Stark leased a home in Southport, a community south of Indianapolis, for himself and his children, but purchased a home on North Delaware Street in Indianapolis in 1910. Stark, who lived at the Delaware Street home for the remainder of his life, built a separate art studio on a lot at the rear of the residence. In addition to painting, Stark loved to read and was known for his sense of humor. He also became a member of the Roberts Park Methodist Episcopal Church in Indianapolis in 1904.

Stark's daughter, Gretchen, became a French teacher in Indianapolis and remained with her father until his death. His three other children married and moved away. Stark's youngest daughter, Suzanne, studied art; his son, Paul, worked for an Indianapolis business; and his son, Edward, was involved in designing the Pathfinder (1912 automobile).

Margaret Stark (1915–1988) received basic instruction in painting from her grandfather, Otto, during her childhood in Indiana. She later became a noted painter and art educator in New York City, and also lived in Europe.

== Career ==
Stark began his career in the mid-1870s as a lithographer in Cincinnati, Ohio, and, after completing his art studies in France in 1888, worked as a lithographer, commercial artist, and illustrator in New York City and in Philadelphia, Pennsylvania. Stark returned to the Midwest after the death of his French wife in 1891, and established his home and art studio in Indianapolis in 1893. Stark was supervisor of art instruction at Emmerich Manual High School in Indianapolis from 1899 to 1919, and worked part-time on the faculty of the John Herron Art Institute from 1905 to 1919. He retired from teaching in 1919 to work as a full-time painter. Stark was an active member of the Indianapolis arts community and frequently displayed his art at numerous exhibitions.

=== Early years ===
Stark began work as a lithographer in Cincinnati, Ohio, in the mid-1870s. After completing his formal art training in New York City and Paris, Stark returned to the United States in 1888 with his French wife, Marie, and one-year-old daughter, Gretchen. Stark found work in New York City as a commercial artist, but supplemented his income with additional work as an illustrator for magazines such as Scribner's Monthly and Harper's Weekly. In 1890 Stark and his family moved to Philadelphia, Pennsylvania, where he continued to work as a commercial artist and illustrator.

Following his wife's death in November 1891, Stark moved his four children to Indianapolis, Indiana, so that his father and sister could care for them while he worked as a lithographer in Cincinnati, Ohio. Stark returned to Indianapolis in late 1893 to establish an art studio and begin his career as an Indianapolis art instructor and continued to paint.

=== Educator ===
In 1899 Stark was named supervisor of art at Emmerich Manual High School in Indianapolis. Stark also taught a summer course at the John Herron Art Institute in Indianapolis in 1902. While continuing to teach full time at Manual High School, Stark joined the Herron Art Institute's faculty in 1905 as a part-time art instructor of composition and illustration. Among his many students were notable artists Marie Goth and William Edouard Scott. Stark resigned both of his teaching positions in 1919 to become a full-time painter.

In addition to a long career as an art instructor, Stark contributed articles and illustrations to the Indianapolis News and wrote "Evolution of Impressionism," which Modern Art magazine published in 1895. Stark was also an active member of the Indianapolis art community. He was elected as an honorary member of the Art Association of Indianapolis (predecessor to the Indianapolis Museum of Art) in 1898. He was also a former president of the Indiana Artists Club and the Portfolio Club. Stark, who became a member of the Society of Western Artists in 1897, served as the group's treasurer from 1906 to 1913. He was also active on six of its exhibition committees. In addition, Stark supervised the Indiana exhibition at the Panama-Pacific International Exhibition in San Francisco, California, in 1915.

=== Artist ===
Stark initially established an art studio in Indianapolis in 1893 to teach art classes, but continued to paint while working as an art instructor. He worked in oil, watercolor, and pastel, and drew on his everyday life experiences as a parent of small children. Stark frequently included young children in his paintings. After his retirement from teaching in 1919, Stark painted on a full-time basis until his death in 1926.

Stark was one of the artists included in the Five Hoosier Painters exhibition that the Central Art Association sponsored in Chicago, Illinois, in December 1894. The exhibition, which was housed in sculptor Lorado Taft's studio in Chicago, comprised more than sixty paintings by Stark, William Forsyth, T. C. Steele, J. Ottis Adams, and Richard Gruelle. These artists were dubbed as the Hoosier Group, in reference to the exhibition. Chicago art critics declared that the group's paintings were "a truly American expression within the modern idiom." Art critics also praised Stark for his "great facility and reserve force." The five artists were professional friends, with some working on collaborative projects and occasionally sharing studio space, but they never formally organized as a group. Each artist maintained their independence and their own artistic styles, while exhibiting their work in many of the same art shows.

Stark's artwork was included in several international, national, regional, and local art exhibitions, including his painting The Committee at the Louisiana Purchase Exposition in 1904 in Saint Louis, Missouri. In 1910 his work was included in international exhibitions in Buenos Aires, Argentina, and at Santiago, Chile. Stark's Sunset over the City was exhibited at an international exposition of art and history in 1911 at Rome, Italy. He also exhibited at annual shows of the Society of Western Artists.

In addition to his numerous paintings, Stark created murals for Indianapolis Public Schools, School Number 60 in 1913 with Indiana artist Carl G. Graf. In 1914, along with Forsyth, Steele, and eleven other artists, Stark painted murals for Indianapolis City Hospital. Stark's contribution for the hospital murals was Toy Parade, a panoramic frieze for a third-floor kindergarten room. In 1914 the Indiana Chapter, Sons of the American Revolution, commissioned Stark to paint a portrait of George Rogers Clark, which was unveiled at the Indiana Statehouse on October 19, 1914. During World War I, Stark joined other area artists to paint life-sized posters to advertise and fundraise for the American Red Cross's war fund. He was also among the artists who painted a Liberty bond mural around 1917 that was hung in Indianapolis's Monument Circle.

== Later years ==
Stark retired from teaching at Manual High School and the John Herron Art Institute in Indianapolis in 1919 to become a full-time painter. Stark continued to paint at his studio in Indianapolis, and took annual painting trips to Leland, Michigan, where he was a guest of the J. Ottis Adams family at their summer home. Stark also painted at "The Hermitage," the Adams' home in Brookville, Indiana, and was a frequent visitor to T. C. Steele's home, "The House of the Singing Winds," in Brown County, Indiana. In addition, Stark painted for two summers at Indiana's Lake Maxinkuckee, and took a three-month painting trip with Adams to New Smyrna Beach, Florida, in 1920–21. Stark also continued to exhibit his work.

== Death and legacy ==
Stark suffered a stroke in April 1926, and died in Indianapolis on April 14, 1926, at the age of sixty-seven.

Stark frequently exhibited his art during his nearly fifty-year painting career, which reached its peak in the 1890s. He submitted more than 750 entries in more than fifty exhibitions, including work exhibited at major exhibitions, such as the Paris Salon of 1886 and 1887, the Trans-Mississippi Exposition at Omaha, Nebraska, in 1898, the Louisiana Purchase Exposition in 1904, international expositions in Argentina and Chile 1910, and the Panama-Pacific International Exposition in 1915 in San Francisco. His work was also exhibited the National Academy of Design in New York City, the Pennsylvania Academy of Fine Arts in Philadelphia, at annual exhibitions of the American Watercolor Society and the Society of Western Artists, and at local exhibitions in his hometown of Indianapolis. Stark's career as an art instructor also influenced his former students, which include several notable Indiana painters, such as Marie Goth, William Edouard Scott, Elmer Taflinger, Evelyn Mess Daily, Emma Eyles Sangernebo, and Bertha Hazelrigg Brown, among others.

== Honors and tributes ==
- In February 1925 Stark's former students honored him with a reception and exhibition at Manual High School.
- Several of Stark's paintings were included in the Indiana State Museum's exhibition, "The Best Years: Indiana Paintings of the Hoosier Group, 1880–1915, Theodore C. Steele, John Ottis Adams, William Forsyth, Otto Stark, Richard Gruelle," from October 11, 1985, through March 16, 1986.
- Stark was one of four surviving members of the Hoosier Group, along with Forsyth, Adams, and Steele, who were the subjects of Wayman Elbridge Adams's life-size portrait, The Art Jury (1921).

== Selected works ==
Stark's work is included in private collections, as well as several art museums in Indiana. These include the Richmond Art Museum, the Evansville Museum of Arts, History and Science, the Indianapolis Museum of Art, the David Owsley Museum of Art Ball State University, and the Indiana State Museum, among others.

- Que Vient? (Who Comes?), selected for the Paris Salon of 1886
- Le Soir (Evening) selected for the Paris Salon of 1887
- Sunset over the City, exhibited at the International Exposition of Art and History in Rome, Italy, in 1911
- The Arsenal Bell, winner of the John Herron Art Institute's first Holcomb prize at the Institute's eighth annual exhibition
- Around the Hearth (1885), exhibited at the Five Hoosier Painters exhibition in Chicago in 1894
- The Art Student (1882), Frank C. Ball Collection, David Owsley Museum of Art, Ball State University, Muncie, Indiana
- Uncle Gus (1893), Richmond Art Museum, Indiana
- Indiana State Fair (1895–1900), Indianapolis Museum of Art, Indiana
- The Backyard (Brookville), (1905–1910), Indiana State Museum, Indianapolis
- Evening Sky (1907), Evansville Museum of Art and Science, Indiana
- A Summer Morning (1909), Indianapolis Museum of Art
- Self Portrait (c. 1925), Indianapolis Museum of Art
