= Selma Neubacher Steele =

American educator and writer (1870–1945)

- Born: Selma Laura Neubacher; October 21, 1870; Indianapolis, Indiana
- Died: August 28, 1945 (aged 74); Indianapolis
- Resting place: Brown County, Indiana
- Education: Pratt Institute
- Occupations: art educator, writer
- Known for: Landscaped grounds and gardens at T. C. Steele State Historic Site
- Spouse(s): T. C. Steele (1846–1926), married 1907–26
- Parent(s): Ludwig (Louis) Neubacher; Margaret Berg Neubacher

Selma Neubacher Steele (October 21, 1870 – August 28, 1945) was an American educator and writer from Indiana who was the second wife of Hoosier Group artist T. C. Steele. She is best remembered for her efforts to landscape the grounds and establish the gardens at the House of the Singing Winds, the Steele home and studio in Brown County, Indiana. It 1945 she donated the property to the Indiana Department of Conservation to established the T. C. Steele State Historic Site. Her remains are buried beside her husband's in the T. C. Steele Memorial Cemetery at the state historic site near Belmont, Brown County, Indiana.

== Early life and education ==
Selma Laura Neubacher, the daughter of Ludwig (Louis) and Margaret Berg Neubacher, was born on October 21, 1870, in Indianapolis, Indiana. Selma's paternal grandfather, Joseph Neubacher, immigrated to the United States from Austria in 1848. Her father was a proprietor of a brass foundry in Indianapolis; her mother was a native of Cincinnati, Ohio.

Selma graduated from Indianapolis High School (later renamed Shortridge High School) in 1887, completing her studies in three and a half years. Selma enrolled in a two-year art education program at the Pratt Institute in Brooklyn, New York, and received a normal art degree in 1905. The coursework prepared her for a career as an art educator and supervisor of art education.

After receiving her degree from Pratt, Selma returned to Indianapolis to teach art. She was also a member of the city's Sketching Club and the Portfolio Club.

== Marriage and family ==
In 1905 Selma's brother, Gustave Neubacher, married Margaret (Daisy) Steele, the daughter of Hoosier Group artist Theodore Clement Steele. At that time T. C. Steele was an established artist in Indiana and a widower whose first wife, Mary Elizabeth (Libbie), had died in 1899.

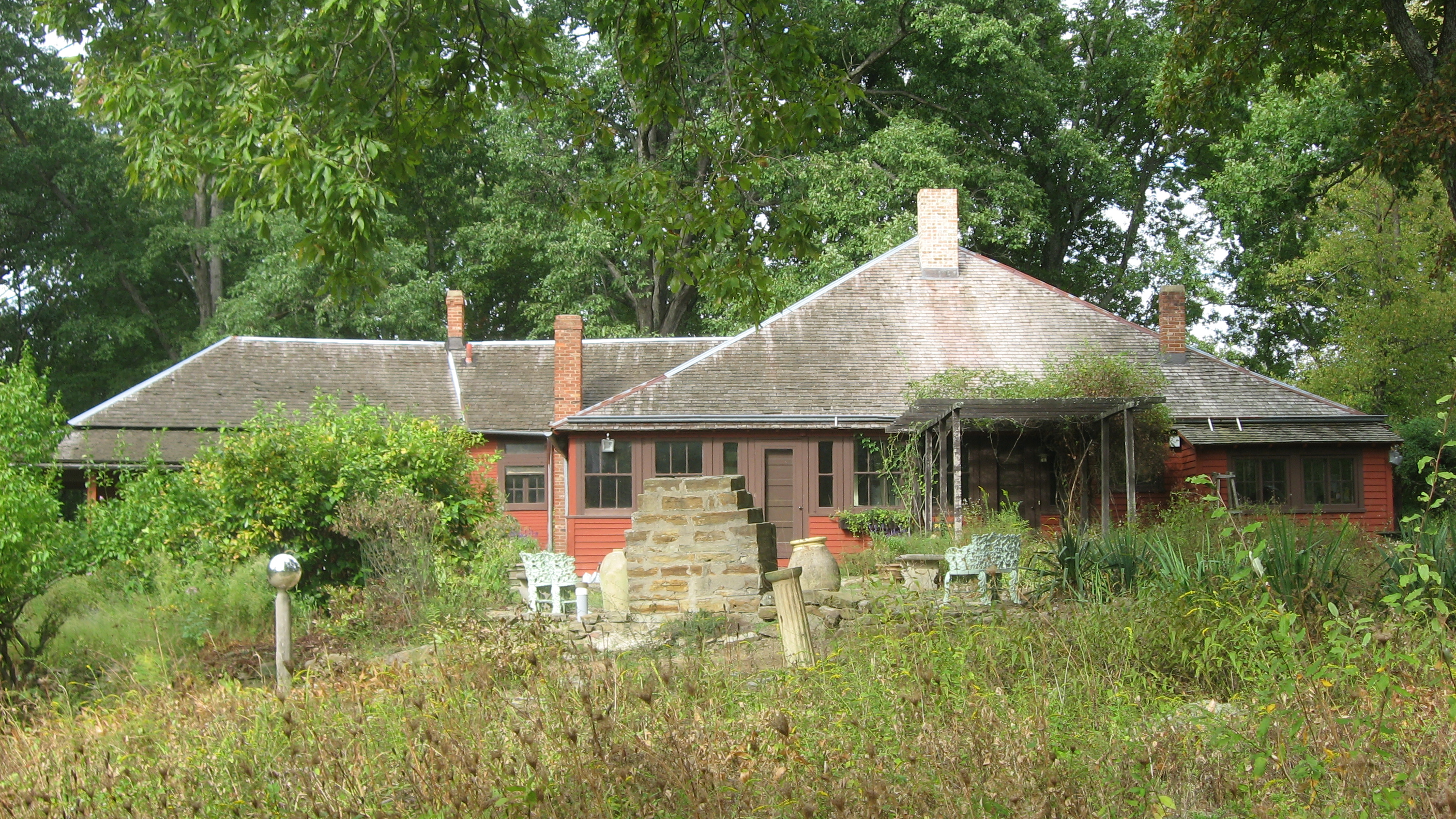
T.C. Steele House

T. C. and Selma had known each other for several years before their marriage on August 9, 1907, in Indianapolis. After the ceremony the couple moved into a newly completed, four-room home and studio on more than 60 acres (24 hectares) of hilltop land in Brown County, Indiana. They named it the House of the Singing Winds.

== Career ==
After graduating from high school in 1887, Selma spent ten years teaching second and third grade in the Indianapolis Public Schools. In 1905, following her graduation from Pratt Institute and a two-year residence in New York, she returned to Indianapolis. Selma became the assistant supervisor of art for the local public schools in 1906, and also taught art classes to educators on Saturdays at the John Herron Art Institute in 1906–07.

In 1907, after her marriage to T. C. Steele, Selma left her teaching career in Indianapolis and moved to Brown County, Indiana. She devoted the remainder of her life to supporting her husband's work as a landscape and portrait artist. Selma became the farm and property manager at the House of the Singing Winds. She maintained and supervised improvements to the Brown County property while Steele focused on his painting. Selma is credited with transforming the grounds surrounding their home into gardens and an artistic landscape "interesting enough to be placed on the painter's canvases." Managing the remote hilltop property proved to be a challenge due to lack of many amenities, including accessible roads, electricity, and running water.

In 1911 T. C. and Selma Steele purchased additional acreage to increase their Brown County property to a total of 211 acres (85 hectares) of land, which became the present-day T. C. Steele State Historic Site. Steele used the landscapes and gardens that Selma created as subjects for several of his paintings.

Over the years Selma supervised several improvements to the property, including the addition of landscaping and flower gardens, a west-wing studio, an enlarged screened porch on the west side, a pergola on the home's east side, and kitchen improvements. Selma also supervised housekeeping and farm labor, managed the farm's livestock (a cow and a horse), and made purchases for the property.

For the first several years the Steeles resided at Brown County during the summer months and returned to Indianapolis for the winter; however, they decided to establish themselves as year-round residents in 1912. After the construction of a large studio on the property in 1916, the Steeles opened their home and its grounds to the public. Over the years Selma served at hostess to more than 30,000 visitors to the hilltop studio/home.

In 1922, when T. C. Steele became artist in residence (honorary professor of art) at Indiana University in Bloomington, Indiana, Selma furnished and decorated a second-floor area in University Library (present-day Franklin Hall) for his use. The converted space became a welcoming art studio and gathering place on campus where Steele and his wife greeted visitors and students could watch the artist at work. The couple resided in Bloomington during the winter months and returned to their home in Brown County in the summer. Although a fire broke out on the grounds of their Brown County property in 1922, the buildings were saved, but Selma retained a fear of forest fires for the remainder of her life and banned campfires on the site.

== Later years ==
Following T. C. Steele's death in 1926, Selma served as executrix of his estate. Part of this effort involved creating an inventory of her husband's paintings and authenticating his unsigned works. Selma and her sister, Edith, continued to live at the Housing of the Singing Winds, but they struggled financially. Selma managed the artist's studio, rented out cabins on the property, and sold farm produce and her husband's paintings to earn cash. She also established a small museum in a log cabin on the property and charged admission for studio tours. In 1934 Selma dedicated the "Trailside Museum" in memory of Walter Neubacher, one of her brothers.

Selma corresponded with leaders at IU as early as 1938 about transferring ownership of the House of the Singing Winds to the school, but the negotiations were never concluded. In July 1945 she donated the entire Brown County property (211 acres (85 hectares) of land) that included the house, its furnishings and decorative arts, a large studio and other buildings, and more than 300 of her husband's paintings to the Indiana Department of Conservation (the present-day Indiana Department of Natural Resources) to establish the T. C. Steele State Historic Site, which was listed on the National Register of Historic Places in 1973 as the Theodore Clement Steele House and Studio.

== Death and legacy ==
Selma died on August 28, 1945. Her ashes were buried beside her husband's on a hillside that was reserved for a family cemetery (the T. C. Steele Memorial Cemetery) at the state historic site near Belmont, Brown County, Indiana.

Art historian Rachel Berenson Perry pointed out that Selma's work in developing and maintaining the Brown County property and transforming it into a public site "helped memorialize T. C. Steele's life and work in perpetuity." The landscaped grounds and flower gardens that she established at the present-day T. C. Steele State Historic Site are open to the public and have been restored, based on photographs, paintings, correspondence, and other historical documents. Perry also credited Selma for her efforts, despite many challenges, to improve the quality of life in Brown County through upgrades to the local infrastructure (especially its roads) and better educational opportunities, as well as supporting nature preservation and soil conservation in the area.

== Honors and tributes ==
The Selma Steele State Nature Preserve on 92 acres (37 hectares) of land within the T. C. Steele State Historic Site in Brown County was dedicated in 1990.

== Published works ==
- "The House of the Singing Winds" in Rachel Berenson Perry, Selma N. Steele, Theodore Steele, and Wilbur D. Peat (2016). The House of the Singing Winds: The Life and Work of T. C. Steele (revised ed.). Indianapolis: Indiana Historical Society. pp. 67–162. ISBN 9780871953988.
