= Fort Wayne Museum of Art =

Art museum in Fort Wayne, Indiana, U.S.

Coordinates: 41°4′52.88″N 85°8′8.85″W

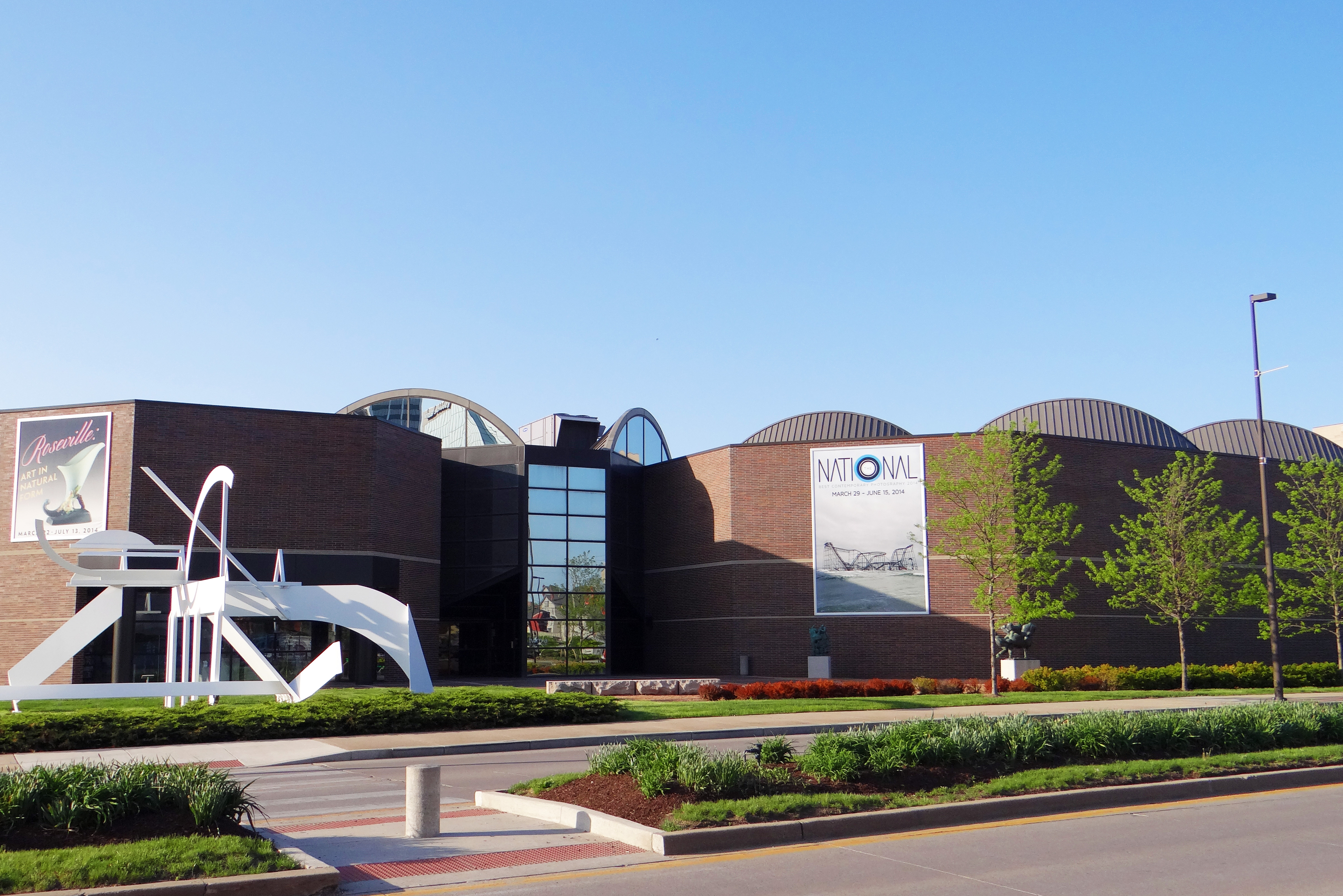
- Established: 1897 (art school); 1921 (museum)
- Location: 311 E. Main St. Fort Wayne, Indiana, U.S.
- Director: Charles A. Shepard III
- Website: www.fwmoa.org

The Fort Wayne Museum of Art (FWMoA) is an American art museum located in downtown Fort Wayne, Indiana, Allen County, United States. The Fort Wayne Museum of Art contains permanent collections and national traveling exhibitions and is accredited by the American Alliance of Museums. FWMoA annually receives about 100,000 visitors.

== History ==
The Fort Wayne Museum of Art was earliest conceived in 1888 when J. Ottis Adams, and later William Forsyth, began teaching informal art classes. By the year 1897, the Fort Wayne Museum of Art School was formally organized from the art classes that had been in session for the past nine years. The function of "museum" was integrated into the school when a collection of ten paintings was donated by Theodore Thieme in 1921. By 1949, the B. Paul Mossman Home at 1202 West Wayne Street in downtown Fort Wayne was donated to the museum, giving the museum an entire facility for the first time in its history to showcase exhibitions and collections. In 1977, the museum separated from the art school, the latter becoming the Department of Fine Arts at Indiana University – Purdue University Fort Wayne.

The Fort Wayne Museum of Art's current home is a structure that opened in 1984 at the intersection of Lafayette Street and Main Street in downtown Fort Wayne. Today, the museum, along with neighboring Arts United Center and Auer Center for Arts and Culture (opened in 2011), serve as the nucleus for downtown's burgeoning Cultural District. After the museum's move in 1984, the B. Paul Mossman Home was converted back to a private residence. In 1995, the homeowners returned the home back to hosting art as the Castle Gallery.

== Facility ==
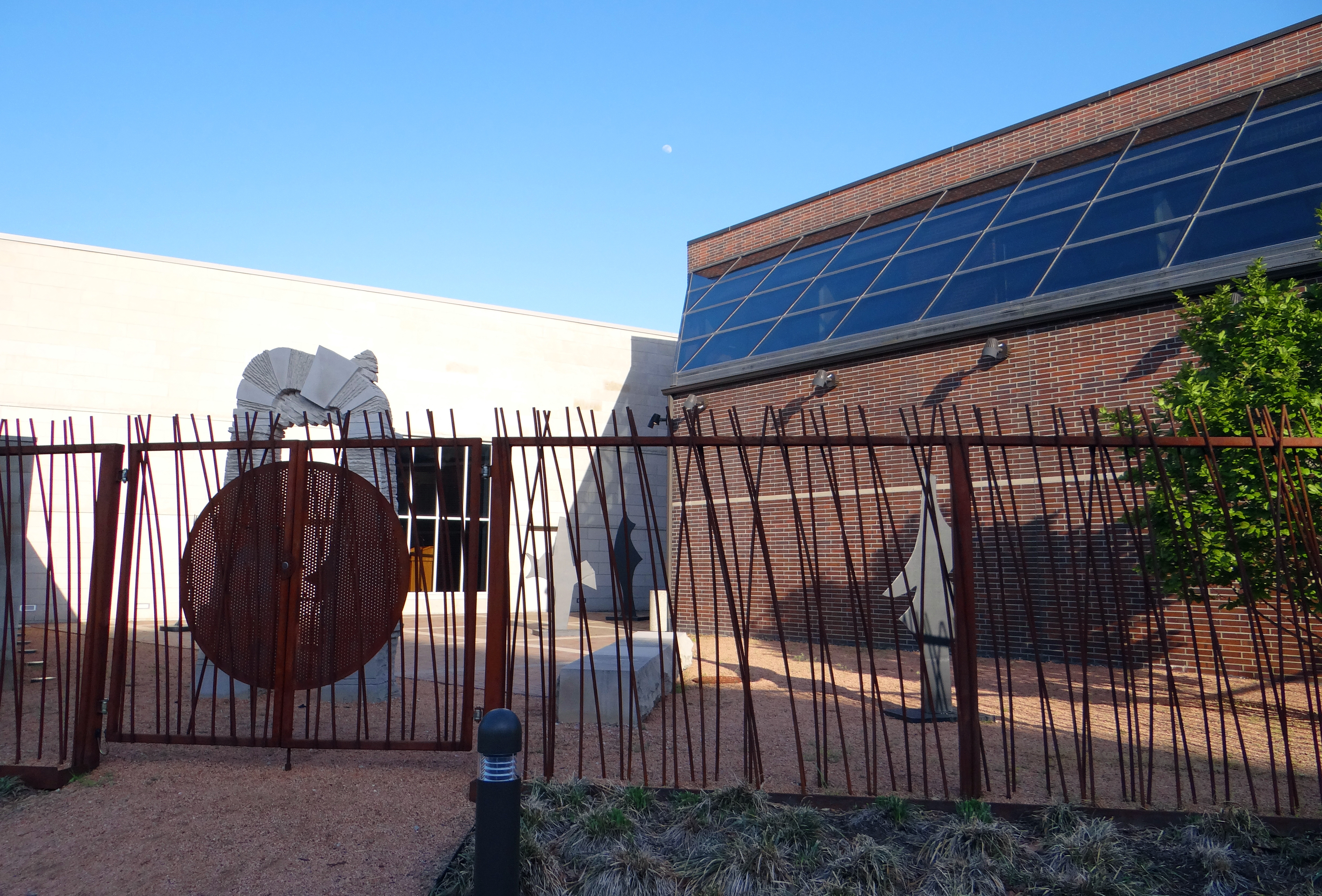
The Sculpture Garden resulted as part of the museum's 2009–2010 expansion.

The current facility of the Fort Wayne Museum of Art, designed by architect Walter Netsch of Skidmore, Owings & Merrill, encompasses 50,000 square feet (4,600 m^{2}) and includes three separate wings: Exhibition/Collection, Education/Administration, and the Auditorium, with an enclosed atrium linking the three wings in the center of the museum. It was announced in May 2008 that the museum would add 10,000 square feet (930 m^{2}) more exhibition space, a bistro, 18,000-volume library, expanded gift shop, and K–12 learning center, along with a complete refurbishment in a $7.5 million capital campaign, all of which was completed by spring 2010.

== Events ==
Annually since 1999, the Fort Wayne Museum of Art has hosted Chalk Walk, as part of the festivities offered during the Three Rivers Festival. During the event, participants are given an assigned "square" on pavement surrounding the museum (either Main Street or the museum parking lot) in which they are to draw with pastels a creation of their own.

== See also ==
- Allen County Public Library
- List of museums in Indiana
