= The Hermitage (Brookville, Indiana) =

Historic house in Indiana, United States

- U.S. National Register of Historic Places
- U.S. Historic district – Contributing property
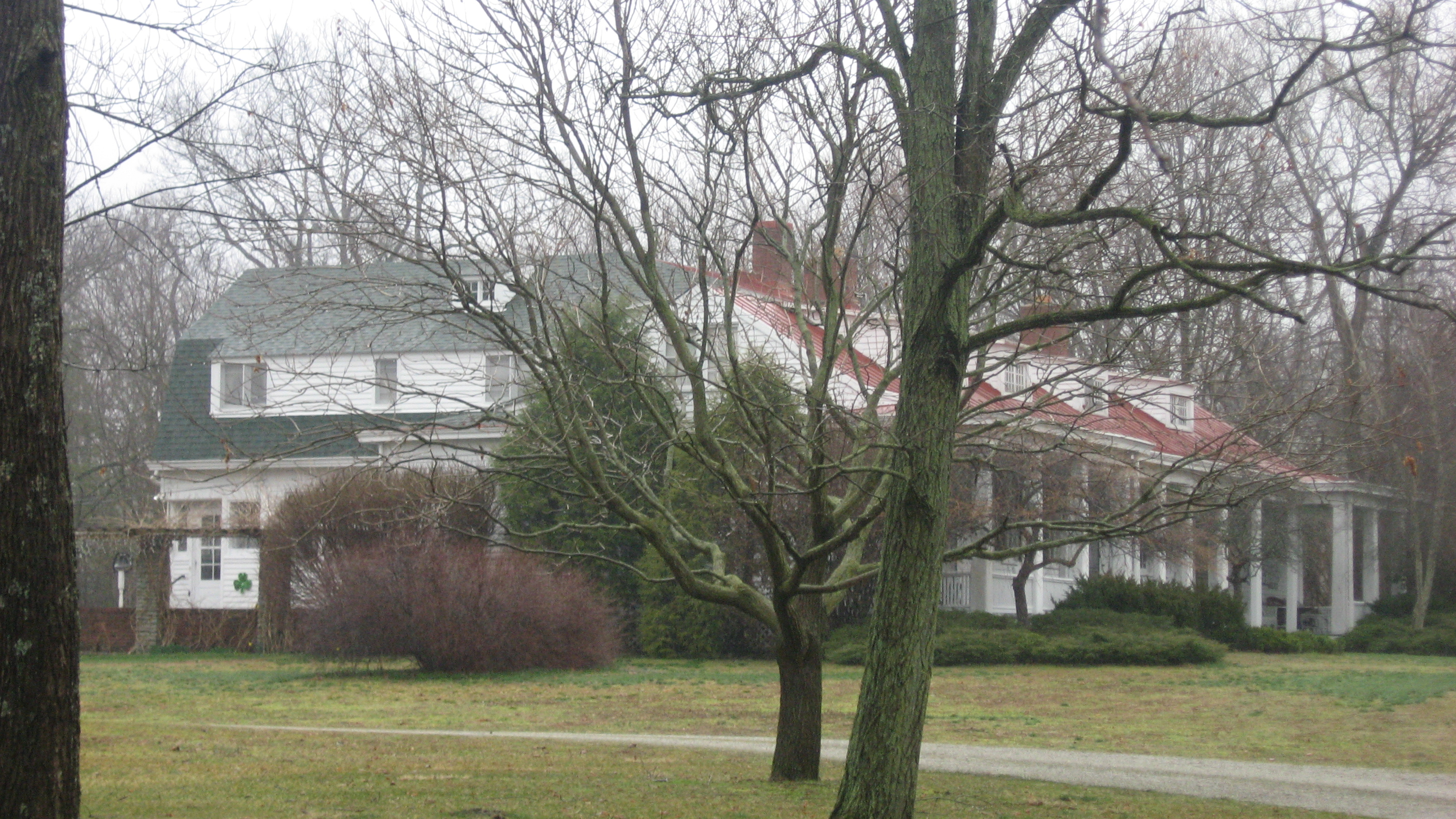
- The Hermitage, March 2012

- Location within Indiana Location within the United States
- Location: 650 E. 8th St., Brookville, Indiana
- Coordinates: 39°25′21″N 85°0′17″W
- Area: 6.1 acres (2.5 ha)
- Built: c. 1835, 1898
- Built by: Adams, John Ottis; et.al.
- Architectural style: Bungalow/craftsman
- NRHP reference No.: 04000209
- Added to NRHP: March 22, 2004

The Hermitage, also known as the John Ottis Adams and Winifred Brady Adams Home and Studio, is a historic home located at Brookville, Indiana. The original house was built about 1835 by well-to-do paper manufacturer James Henry Speer. It was reconfigured in 1898 by John Ottis Adams and his wife Winifred Brady Adams.

It is a 1 1/2-story, Bungalow / American Craftsman inspired frame dwelling sheathed in clapboard. A full-width front porch supported by 17 tapered columns. At each end of the house are artist's studios, built for each of the Adamses. A rear section rises to 2 1/2 stories. Also on the property are the levee built after a flood in 1913, contributing gazebo (c. 1910), pergola (c. 1910), and outhouse.

Originally painter J. Ottis Adams (1851–1927) shared the house and studios with T.C. Steele. By 1899 he and his wife Winifred Brady Adams, a still-life painter, took over full possession of the property.

The Hermitage was listed on the National Register of Historic Places in 2004. It is located in the Brookville Historic District.
