= Constance Forsyth =

Artist, printmaker, and professor of art

- Born: August 18, 1903; Indianapolis, Indiana
- Died: January 22, 1987 (aged 83)
- Resting place: Crown Hill Cemetery and Arboretum Section 39 Lot 298; 39.8183284°N 86.165859°W
- Occupations: Artist, teacher

Constance Forsyth (1903–1987) was an American artist, teacher, and printmaker. Her work is in the permanent collections of several museums, including the Blanton Museum of Art and the Indianapolis Museum of Art.

== Early life and education ==
Forsyth was born on August 18, 1903, in Indianapolis, Indiana. She was the middle child born to her parents, the artist William Forsyth and Alice (Atkinson) Forsyth.

Forsyth attended Shortridge High School and then Butler University in Indianapolis, where she earned a B.A. in chemistry in 1925, Forsyth began formal painting instruction at the John Herron Art Institute, where she studied with Helene Hibben. She subsequently studied at the Pennsylvania Academy of Fine Arts, where she was introduced to grease crayons as a drawing material, and the Broadmoor Art Academy where she studied under Boardman Robinson and John Ward Lockwood.

== Career ==
Forsyth first worked as an instructor at the John Herron Art Institute, Western College for Women, and the University of Texas at El Paso. While at the John Herron Art Institute, she organized her students' work in Indianapolis, though she and her father were part of a group of people who were fired and then allowed to return on a part-time basis.

In 1940, she moved to the University of Texas in Austin where she established a printmaking program, and was part of a cohort of artists joining the university at that time. With supplies limited because of World War II, she made projects work with limited supplies.In 1973, Forsyth was promoted to professor emeritus.

Forsyth is known for her printmaking and her watercolors. She is known for her semiabstract explorations of natural forms like as waves, mountains, and, particularly, clouds. Her subjects included outdoor scenes, such as Westcliffe, Colorado that was shown in the World's Fair in New York in 1939. She helped Thomas Hart Benton with the Indiana murals for the Century of Progress exposition in Chicago in 1933. Forsyth also worked as an illustrator for two books: Charles Garrett Vannest's Lincoln the Hoosier: Abraham Lincoln's Life in Indiana (1928) and Esther Buffler's The Friends (1951). Forsyth's work is in the permanent collection at the Blanton Museum of Art, the McNay Art Museum, the Indianapolis Museum of Art, and the Dallas Museum of Art.

Constance Forsyth died on January 22, 1987.

== Awards and honors ==
Awards won by Forsyth include the Naomi Goldman prize and the Even Clendenin prize from the National Association of Women Artists. The Archer M. Huntington Art Gallery acknowledged her efforts with a combined retrospective with William L. Lester in 1974, one year after her retirement. On March 22, 1985, the Printmaker Emeritus Award was granted to her by the Southern Graphics Council in appreciation of her excellent achievements in the profession.
