= J. Ottis Adams =

American painter (1851–1927)

John Ottis Adams
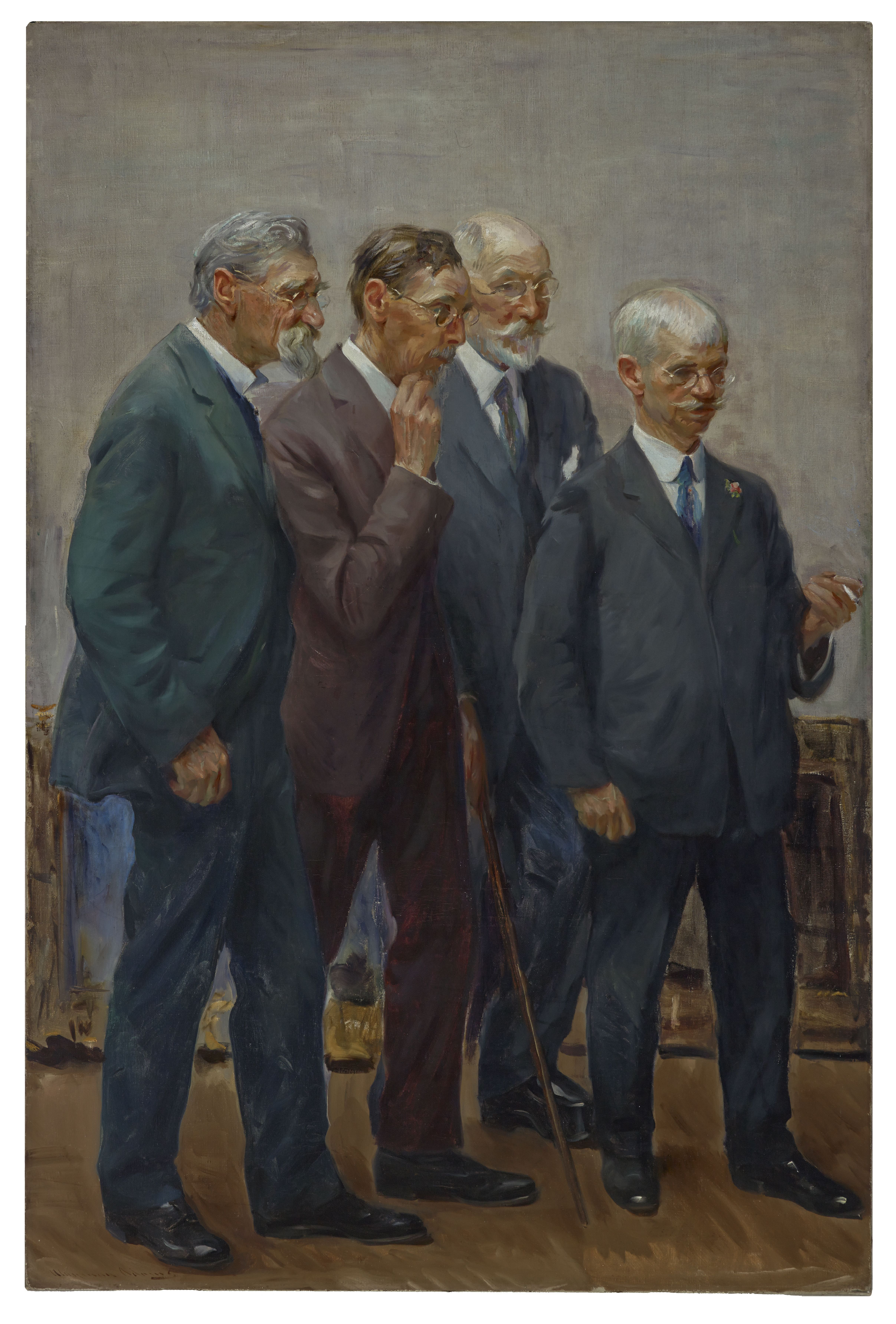
- Adams, depicted third from the left, in The Art Jury by Wayman Elbridge Adams (Painting in the collection of the Indianapolis Museum of Art)
- Born: John Ottis Adams; July 8, 1851; Amity, Johnson County, Indiana, United States
- Died: January 28, 1927 (aged 75); Indianapolis, Indiana, United States
- Education: South Kensington School of Art, London (1872–74); Academy of Fine Arts, Munich (1880–1885)
- Known for: Painting
- Movement: American Impressionism

John Ottis Adams (July 8, 1851 – January 28, 1927) was an American Impressionist painter and art educator who is best known as a member of the Hoosier Group of Indiana landscape painters, along with William Forsyth, Richard B. Gruelle, Otto Stark, and T. C. Steele. In addition, Adams was among a group that formed the Society of Western Artists in 1896, and served as the organization's president in 1908 and 1909.

Adams grew up in central Indiana, but received his formal art training at the South Kensington School of Art in London. He spent seven years in Germany, where he attended the Academy of Fine Arts, Munich. Adams formed the Muncie Art School with Forsyth, but the school closed after two years. Adams also assisted in planning and taught art classes at the John Herron Art Institute, which later became the Indianapolis Museum of Art and the John Herron School of Art in Indianapolis. He also gave informal art lessons at the Hermitage, his home and studio near Brookville, Indiana. In 2004 the building was listed on the National Register of Historic Places; it is also a contributing property to the Brookville Historic District.

Several major exhibitions have included Adams's work: Five Hoosier Painters in Chicago, Illinois, in 1894; the Louisiana Purchase Exposition (World's Fair) in Saint Louis, Missouri, in 1904; the Panama–Pacific International Exposition in San Francisco, California, in 1915; and the first Hoosier Salon in Chicago in 1925. In 1910 Adams exhibited internationally at the Buenos Aires Exposition in Buenos Aires, Argentina and Santiago, Chile, where one of his paintings, A Frosty Morning, received an honorable mention. Adams won several other prizes for his art. Iridescence of a Shallow Stream won a bronze medal at the Louisiana Purchase Exposition (the 1904 World's Fair) and A Winter Morning won the $500 Fine Arts Building Prize at the Society of Western Artists exhibition in Chicago in 1907. Adams's work is represented in the collections of several Indiana civic and cultural institutions.

Today his paintings are held in a number of private collections and museums, including the Haan Mansion Museum of Indiana Art.

== Early life and education ==
John Ottis Adams was born on July 8, 1851, in Amity, Johnson County, Indiana. His parents were Elizabeth Strange and Alban Housley Adams. Because Adams's parents relocated frequently, he spent his youth in Franklin, Shelbyville, and Martinsville, Indiana. The family moved to Franklin shortly after his birth, and then to Shelbyville, where Alban worked as a local merchant and part-time farmer.

Adams attended elementary school at Franklin and Shelbyville, and after the family's move to Martinsville, he graduated from Martinsville High School. One of Adams's teachers at Martinsville recognized his artistic ability and encouraged him to continue to study art. In 1869, when Adams was eighteen years old, he visited the Indiana State Fair, where he saw Still Life with Watermelon, an early work by William Merritt Chase. The painting inspired Adams to become an artist. Although Adams had limited finances, he enrolled at Wabash College in Crawfordsville, Indiana, but attended classes for only two years.

In 1872 Adams left Indiana to study at the South Kensington School of Art in London. A standard part of his training, and a typical exercise for most art students in London, was to paint reproductions of the masters at the National Gallery. During this practice, Adams also saw the work of landscape painters John Constable and J. M. W. Turner. Adams also worked at a London photography studio to help fund his art training. At the completion of his studies in 1873, Adams was awarded a certificate from the school and remained in London to study with John Parker, a landscape and genre painter who primarily worked in watercolor. Adams returned to the United States in late 1874 to begin his career as a painter and art educator.

== Marriage and family ==
On October 1, 1898, Adams married Winifred Brady, a still-life painter and one of his former art students in Muncie, Indiana. Brady, who was twenty years younger than Adams, attended Drexel Institute in Philadelphia and the Art Students League of New York. The couple had three sons: John Alban (born in 1900), Edward Wolfe (born in 1902), and Robert Brady (born in 1904).

== Career ==
In 1874, after completing his art studies in London, Adams returned to the United States to earn a living as a portrait painter. Initially, he lived with his parents again at their home in Seymour, Indiana, and opened a portrait studio.

In the spring of 1875 Adams relocated to Martinsville, and in 1876 he settled in Muncie, Indiana. There he opened a studio and spent four years painting portraits. Muncie's most prominent families were among his clientele. Adams worked for a local photography studio, most likely tinting photographs to add color to the images, to supplement his income.

In 1880 Adams decided to pursue further art studies in Munich, Germany. To fund his additional training, Adams painted reproductions of paintings by the Old Masters that hung in Munich's Alte Pinakothek galleries and sold them on a subscription basis to clients in the United States. Adams sailed from New York City with several other American artists, including fellow Hoosier artists T. C. Steele and Samuel Richards, and spent seven years in Munich. Other American artists in Munich at the same time included William Forsyth, J. Frank Currier, and Benjamin Rutherford Fitz, among others. Adams, Steele, and Forsyth would later become known as members of the Hoosier Group of artists, along with Otto Stark, and Richard B. Gruelle. Adams studied at the Academy of Fine Arts, Munich, from 1880 to 1885. Gyula Benczúr was his drawing instructor; Ludwig von Löfftz was his painting instructor; and Steele was one of his classmates. Adams left the academy in 1885 to set up a studio in Munich. He also served for two years as president of the American Artists Club of Munich.

Adams returned to Muncie in 1887, where he rented a downtown studio. He both painted and taught art classes. He also commuted from Muncie to teach several night classes at Fort Wayne, Indiana. After Forsyth's return from Germany in 1888, he commuted from his home in Indianapolis to help Adams teach art classes at Muncie and Fort Wayne. In 1889, with financial support from fourteen local businessmen, Adams and Forsyth formed the Muncie Art School and served as its instructors. The school closed for undisclosed reasons in 1891. Several of Forsyth's and Adams's students later established the Art Students' League of Muncie. Adams participated in the group as an honorary member.

In 1894 Adams was one of the painters invited to contribute to the Five Hoosier Painters exhibition, sponsored by the Central Art Association in Chicago. Two of Adams's paintings, The Frosty Morning and October, were exhibited at the show. As a result, the five Indiana men (Adams, Forsyth, Gruelle, Stark, and Steele) were identified as the Hoosier Group of painters.

Although the artists maintained their individuality, they often painted together at various sites around Indiana, especially during the period 1895 to 1900. In addition, Adams was among the group that formed the Society of Western Artists in 1896. He was a regular exhibitor at its shows from 1896 through 1914, and served as the organization's president in 1908 and 1909.

Adams spent the fall of 1896 painting with Steele and others at Metamora, Indiana, and returned to the area known as the Whitewater Valley in 1897. Adams and Steele bought property a half-mile from Brookville, Indiana, on the eastern fork of the Whitewater River in 1898. The artists renovated an old home, which Steele's wife, Libby, named the Hermitage. It included separate studios and living quarters, where the artists lived with their families and painted during the warmer months. In early 1899 Adams and his wife, Winifred Brady Adams, a still-life painter, moved into the Hermitage; however, the couple spent the winter months in Indianapolis.

In 1901 Adams became involved in planning a new art school for the Art Association of Indianapolis. Together with a group of local citizens and other members of the Hoosier Group, he founded the John Herron School of Art. This later developed as the Indianapolis Museum of Art and the John Herron School of Art in Indianapolis. The art school officially opened on March 4, 1902, with Adams and Stark serving as faculty members. In addition, Adams rented studio space in downtown Indianapolis with Steele and Gruelle to exhibit their work.

From 1901 to 1906, while Adams was involved in establishing the art institute at Indianapolis and served as an art instructor at the school, he, his wife, and their three sons lived in Indianapolis and at Southport, on the city's south side, during the school term. In 1905 the family built a cottage (which was nicknamed Bluebelle) overlooking Lake Michigan at Indiana Woods, a secluded enclave for wealthy families. Winifred's older sister, Elizabeth, and her husband, Frank Clayton Ball, who was one of the five Ball brothers, also had a summer home at Indiana Woods.

Adams resigned from the institute at the end of the 1905–06 school year, and returned to the Hermitage with his family. In April 1907 Adams bought Steele's ownership interest in the property and made it his family's formal residence.He and his wife continued to paint in the studio spaces at The Hermitage, and Adams also conducted informal art classes there. During the Great Flood of 1913, the Hermitage was partially destroyed by floodwaters. Adams had the undamaged portions rebuilt and continued to use it as a family residence and art studio. While Adams painted at the Hermitage during the summers, his wife and sons took annual trips to Leland, Michigan, where they had a summer cottage. Adams frequently went to Leland to visit and paint.

In 1914 Adams, Forsyth, Stark, Steele, and eleven other artists under Forsyth's direction were invited to create thirty-three murals for Indianapolis's City Hospital. Unlike the other artists, who painted their murals on site, Adams and Steele painted their works at their own studios.

== Later years ==
Although his health began to fail, Adams continued to paint to the end of his life, exploring new landscapes beyond his home in Indiana. In 1915, following orders from his doctor, Adams spent several months south of Saint Petersburg, Florida, on the Gulf of Mexico. It became the first of several annual trips he made to Florida to paint landscapes. While Adams spent the winter months in Florida, his wife and sons resided at their home in Indianapolis.

During the summer, Adams and his family spent time at their cottage in Leland, Michigan, and at the Hermitage, near Brookville, Indiana, which served as a gathering place for his fellow artists and friends, including Stark, Steele, Forsyth, Lewis Henry Meakin, and George Jo Mess. Stark also accompanied Adams on several trips to Leland, as well as excursions to New Smyrna, Florida, where Adams had a studio built in 1922 and purchased property in 1923–24.

== Death and legacy ==
In 1926, following his return to Indiana from a trip to New Smyrna, Florida, Adams suffered a decline in health. He had surgery for an intestinal disorder, but never fully recovered. Adams died at his home in Indianapolis on January 28, 1927. His remains are interred at Beech Grove Cemetery in Muncie, Indiana.

Throughout his life Adams encouraged others to pursue an interest in art. Together with Forsyth, Adams instructed American impressionist artist Francis Focer Brown (1891–1971). He also taught many other students, including Dorothy Morlan, Helen McKay Steele, and Julia Graydon Sharpe.

Adams's years in Muncie coincided with the community's growing interest in the arts, especially among its prominent citizens during the period 1870 to 1892. In a town that was primarily an agricultural and industrial community, Adams's work there in the late nineteenth century, along with its art schools and the local Art Students League, helped stimulate awareness of the visual arts. Further development continued after the turn of the century with the formation of the Muncie Art Association in 1905, the reopening of the Indiana State Normal School–Eastern Division in 1918 (renamed in Ball State University in 1965), development of the college's art curriculum, and the formation of other local arts institutions.

Major exhibitions that included Adams's work included Five Hoosier Painters, Chicago (1894) and the Panama–Pacific International Exposition in San Francisco, California, in 1915. Adams's work was exhibited at the first Hoosier Salon held in Chicago, Illinois, in 1925, along with other distinguished members of the Hoosier Group (Steele, Forsyth, and Stark). Adams also exhibited internationally, winning a prize at the Buenos Aires Exposition in Buenos Aires, Argentina and Santiago, Chile, in 1910. In addition, Adams won prizes for art he exhibited at the Louisiana Purchase Exposition (World's Fair) in Saint Louis, Missouri, in 1904, and the Society of Western Artists exhibition in Chicago in 1907. Adams regularly exhibited his art in the Midwest, including exhibitions sponsored by the Society of Western Artists, Art Association of Indianapolis, Cincinnati Art Museum Association, Muncie Art Association, and the Art Association of Richmond, Indiana, among others.

As Forsyth, a longtime friend, described Adams, "the great love of his soul was the out-of-doors and the open road." According to one art critic's summary of Adams's work, "His interest was less in obvious beauty than in the beauty that often goes unperceived."

== Gallery ==
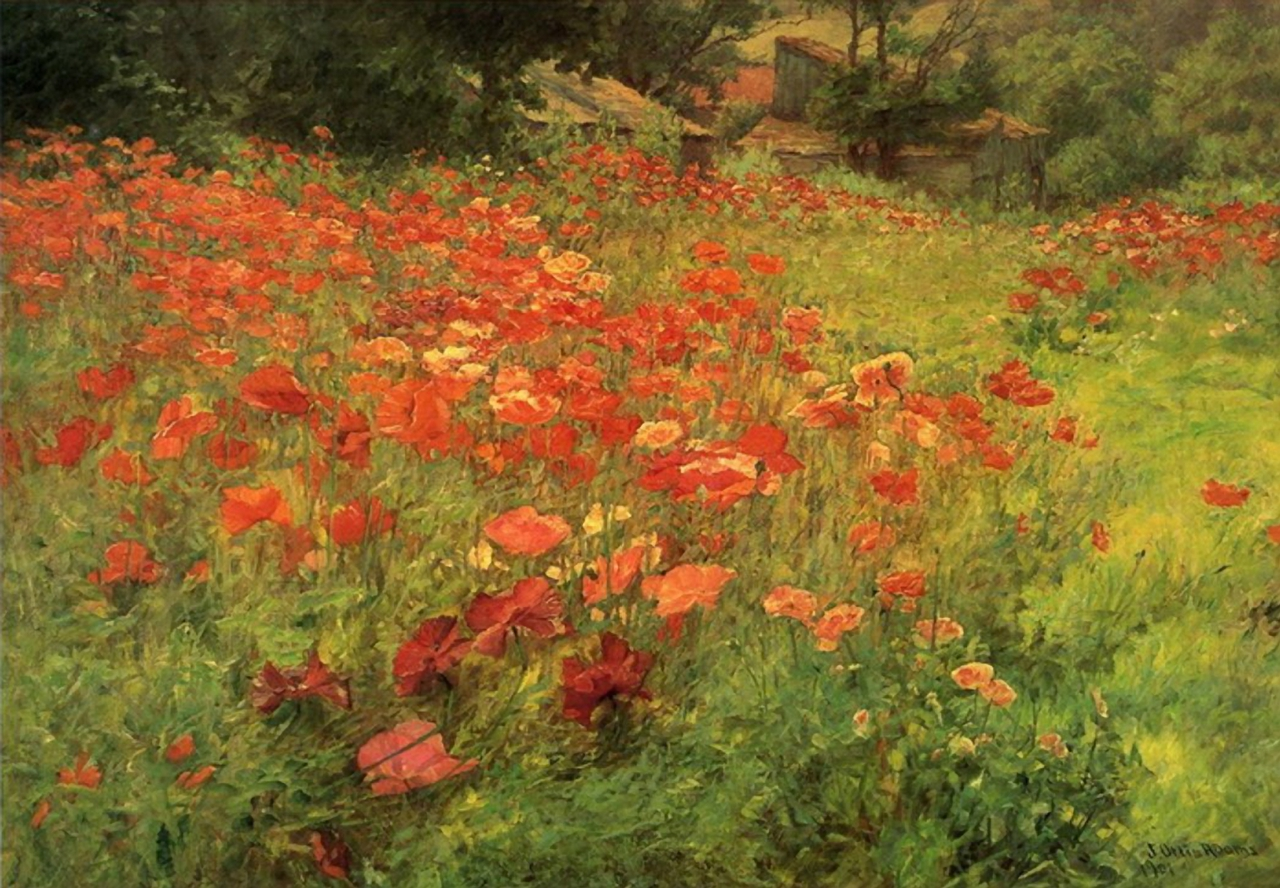
"In Poppyland"

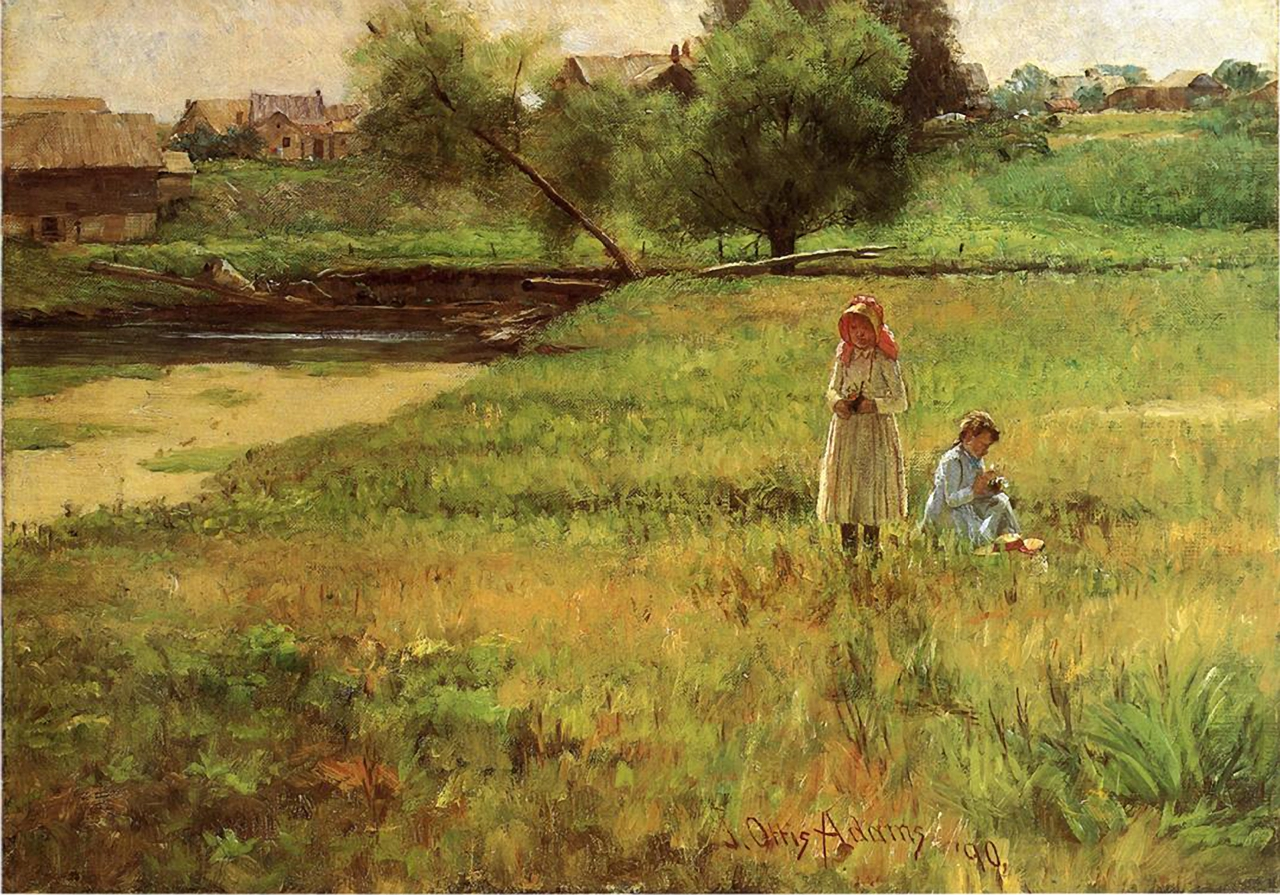
"Summertime"

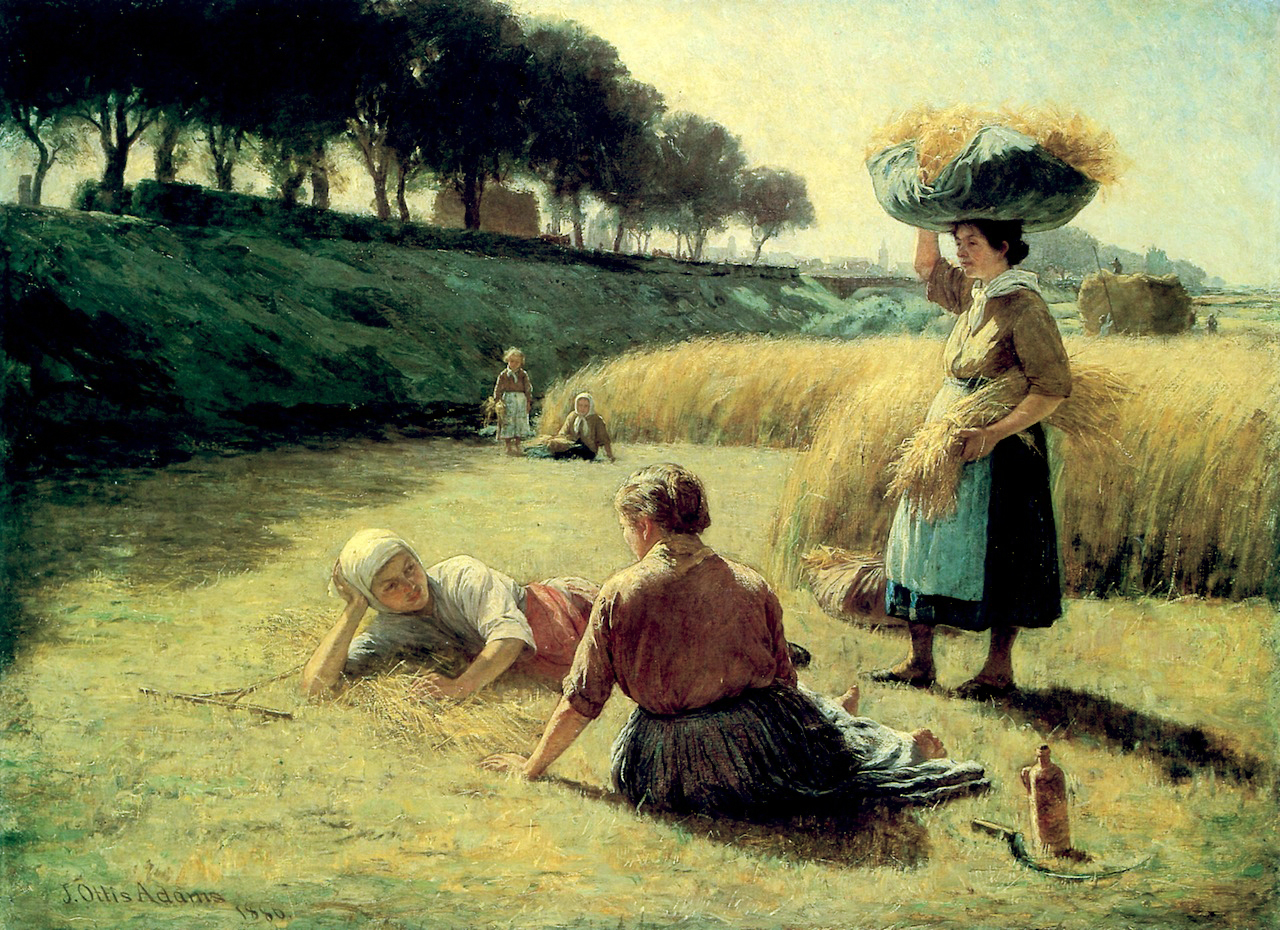
"Gleaners at Rest"

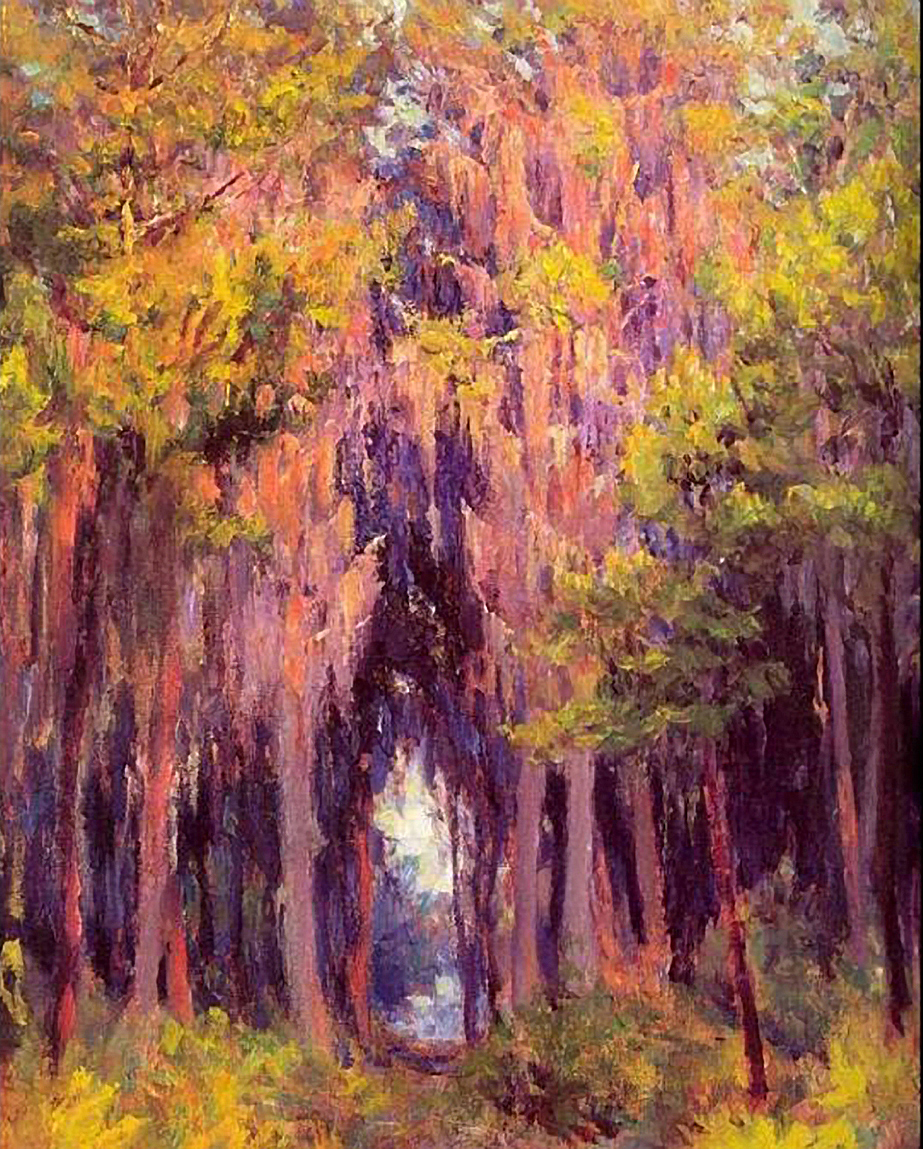
"Hanging Moss"

== Selected works ==
- A Bit of the Whitewater, exhibited at the Panama-Pacific International Exposition in San Francisco, California, in 1915
- A Frosty Morning, received an honorable mention at the International Exhibition of Fine Arts, Buenos Aires, Argentina, and Santiago, Chile
- A Misty Morning on the Mississinewa (1895), Ball State University Art Gallery
- A Winter Day, won the Mary T. R. Foulke Prize at a Richmond, Indiana, art exhibition in 1909
- A Winter Morning, won the $500 Fine Arts Building Prize at the Society of Western Artists exhibition in Chicago in 1907
- An August Sunset–Prairie Dell (1894), Indianapolis Museum of Art
- Autumn on the Whitewater (1901), DePauw University
- Gleaners at Rest (Nooning) (1886), Ball State University Art Gallery
- Hollyhocks and Poppies––The Hermitage (1901), Fort Wayne Museum of Art
- In the Whitewater Valley (1900), Swope Art Museum
- Iridescence of a Shallow Stream (1902), won a bronze medal at the Louisiana Purchase Exposition (World's Fair) at Saint Louis in 1904
- Moonlight on the Whitewater (ca. 1900), Indiana State Museum
- October, exhibited at the Five Hoosier Painters exhibition in Chicago in 1894
- Street in New Smyrna, Florida, Indiana State Museum
- Summertime (1890), Ball State University Art Gallery
- The Closing of an Autumn Day (1901), Evansville Museum of Arts, History and Science
- The Ebb of Day (The Bank) (1903–04), selected for exhibition at the Louisiana Purchase Exposition (World's Fair) at Saint Louis in 1904
- The Glimmerglass of the Mississinewa (1895), Ball State University Art Gallery
- The Grist Mill (1902), Brookville Library
- The Old Mills of Brookville (1900–02), Brookville Library
- Wheeling Pike, Muncie Public Library
- Wash Day, Bavaria (1885), the first painting Adams sent home from Munich for exhibition. The landscape, which was one of his favorites, was displayed in New York in 1886 and hung in his Muncie art studio after his return to the United States.

== Public collections ==
Adams's work is represented in the collections of several of Indiana's civic, educational, and cultural institutions.

- Art Association of Muncie, Indiana
- Art Association of Richmond, Indiana
- Ball State University Art Gallery, Muncie
- Brookville Library, Brookville, Indiana
- DePauw University, Greencastle, Indiana
- Evansville Museum of Arts, History and Science, Evansville, Indiana
- Fort Wayne Museum of Art, Fort Wayne, Indiana
- Haan Mansion Museum of Indiana Art
- Indiana State Museum, Indianapolis
- Indianapolis Museum of Art (Herron Art Institute), Indianapolis
- Muncie Public Library, Muncie, Indiana
- Swope Art Museum, Terre Haute, Indiana

== Honors and tributes ==
- Awarded an honorary Master of Arts degree from Wabash College.
- One of four surviving members of the Hoosier Group (Adams, Forsyth, Stark, and Steele) who were the subjects of Wayman Elbridge Adams's lifesize portrait, The Art Jury, painted in 1921.
- In 2004 The Hermitage was listed on the National Register of Historic Places because of Adams's contributions. It is also a contributing property to the Brookville Historic District, also listed on the NRHP.
