= T. C. Steele =

American painter

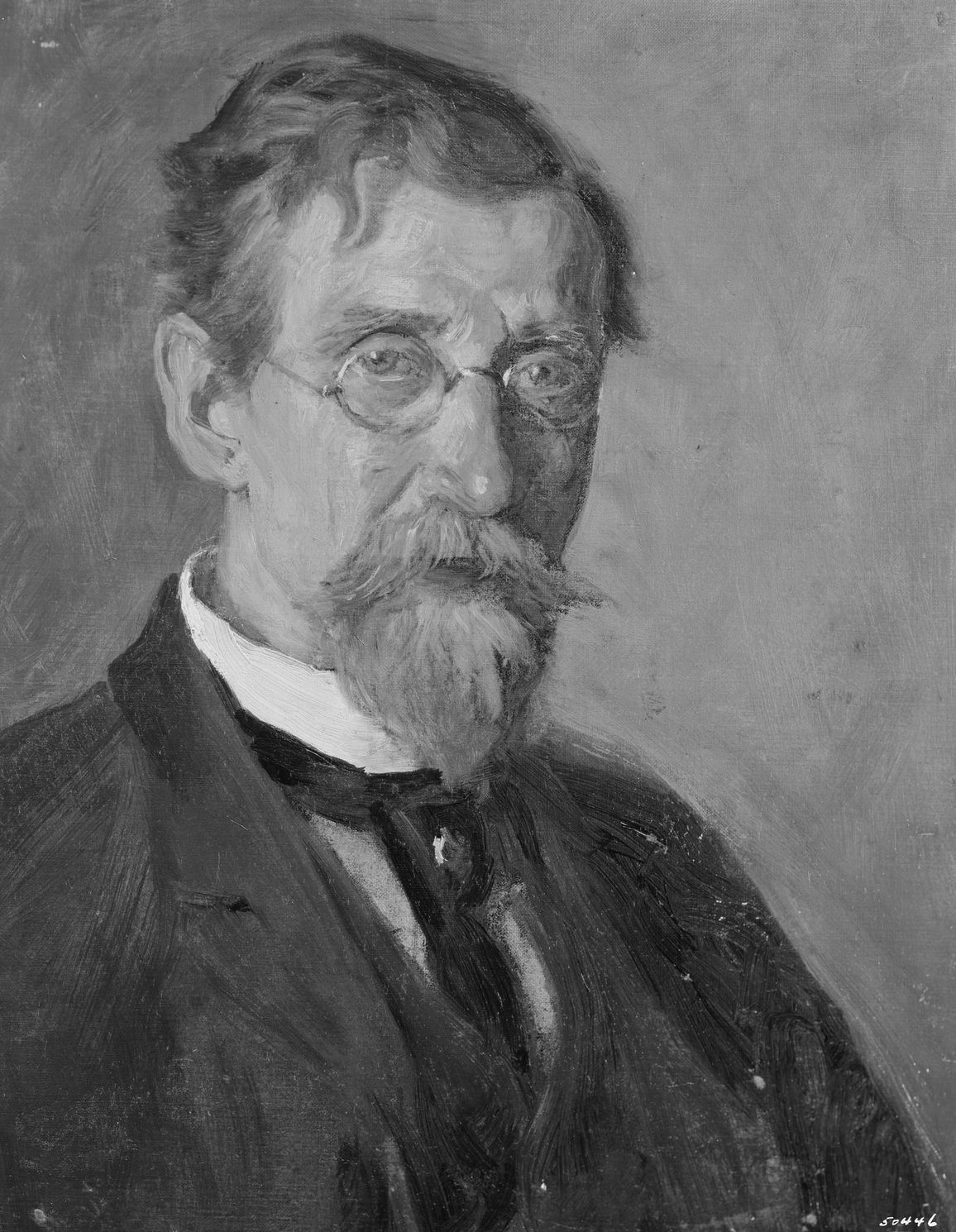
- Born: Theodore Clement Steele; September 11, 1847; Owen County, Indiana, US
- Died: July 24, 1926 (aged 78); Brown County, Indiana, US
- Known for: Painting
- Style: American Impressionism
- Spouses: Mary Elizabeth Libby (m. 1870; died 1899) Selma Laura Neubacher (m. 1907)

Theodore Clement Steele (September 11, 1847 – July 24, 1926) was an American Impressionist painter known for his Indiana landscapes. Steele was an innovator and leader in American Midwest painting and is one of the most famous of Indiana's Hoosier Group painters. In addition to painting, Steele contributed writings, public lectures, and hours of community service on art juries that selected entries for national and international exhibitions, most notably the Universal Exposition (1900) in Paris, France, and the Louisiana Purchase Exposition (1904) in Saint Louis, Missouri. He was also involved in organizing pioneering art associations, such as the Society of Western Artists.

Steele’s work has appeared in a number of prestigious exhibitions, including the World’s Columbian Exposition (1893) in Chicago, Illinois; the Five Hoosier Painters exhibition (1894) in Chicago; the Louisiana Purchase Exposition (1904) in Saint Louis; the International Exhibit of Fine Arts (1910) in Buenos Aires, Argentina, and Santiago, Chile; and at the Panama–Pacific International Exposition (1915) in San Francisco, California.

Steele’s work is widely collected by museums and individuals. His paintings in public collections include those of the Haan Mansion Museum of Indiana Art, Indiana State Museum, Indianapolis Museum of Art, Swope Art Museum, the Los Angeles County Museum of Art, and the Indiana University Art Museum in Bloomington, Indiana, among others.

Steele’s contributions were recognized with honorary degrees from Wabash College in 1900 and Indiana University in 1916. In addition, Steele was elected to an associate membership in New York’s National Academy of Design in 1913.

== Early life and education ==
Steele was born near Gosport in Owen County, Indiana, on September 11, 1847, the eldest child of Samuel Hamilton and Harriett Newell Evans Steele. Steele’s father was a saddle maker and farmer. In 1852 the family moved to Waveland in Montgomery County, Indiana, where Steele developed an interest in art and learned to draw. The T.C. Steele Boyhood Home at Waveland was listed on the National Register of Historic Places in 2003.

Steele began formal art training as a boy at the Waveland Collegiate Institute (Waveland Academy). At sixteen, he continued his art training at Asbury College (now DePauw University) in Greencastle, Indiana. Steele also studied briefly in Chicago, Illinois, and Cincinnati, Ohio, before returning to Indiana to paint portraits on commission.

== Marriage and family ==
In 1870 Steele married Mary Elizabeth (Libby) Lakin. The couple moved to Battle Creek, Michigan, where a son Rembrandt, or Brandt, was born in 1870; a daughter Margaret (Daisy) was born in 1872. Soon after Daisy's birth the family moved to Indianapolis, Indiana. Although it was difficult, Steele managed to support his family by painting commissioned portraits and commercial signs. In addition, Steele had occasional public exhibits of his work such as the Indiana Art Association’s First Quarterly Exhibition at the Indiana School of Art On May 7, 1878, with his fellow Hoosier artists Jacob Cox (1810–1892), William Forsyth (1854–1935), Charles Joseph Fiscus (1861–1884), and others. Another son, Shirley, was born in Indianapolis in 1879. Libby, who suffered from chronic rheumatoid arthritis and tuberculosis, died in 1899. Daisy Steele married Gustave Neubacher of Indianapolis in 1905.

Steele married Selma Laura Neubacher, an Indianapolis art educator and Gustave's older sister, on August 9, 1907, in Indianapolis. The newlyweds immediately moved into a newly constructed, four-room home, which they named the House of the Singing Winds, on more than 171 acres (69 hectares) of hilltop land in Brown County, Indiana. In 1910 Steele purchased the adjoining 40-acre tract as an addition to his original 171-acre tract, bringing the total acreage to 211 acres (85 hectares). T. C. and Selma, who was twenty-five years younger than Steele, had no children together. She died on August 28, 1945.

== Career ==
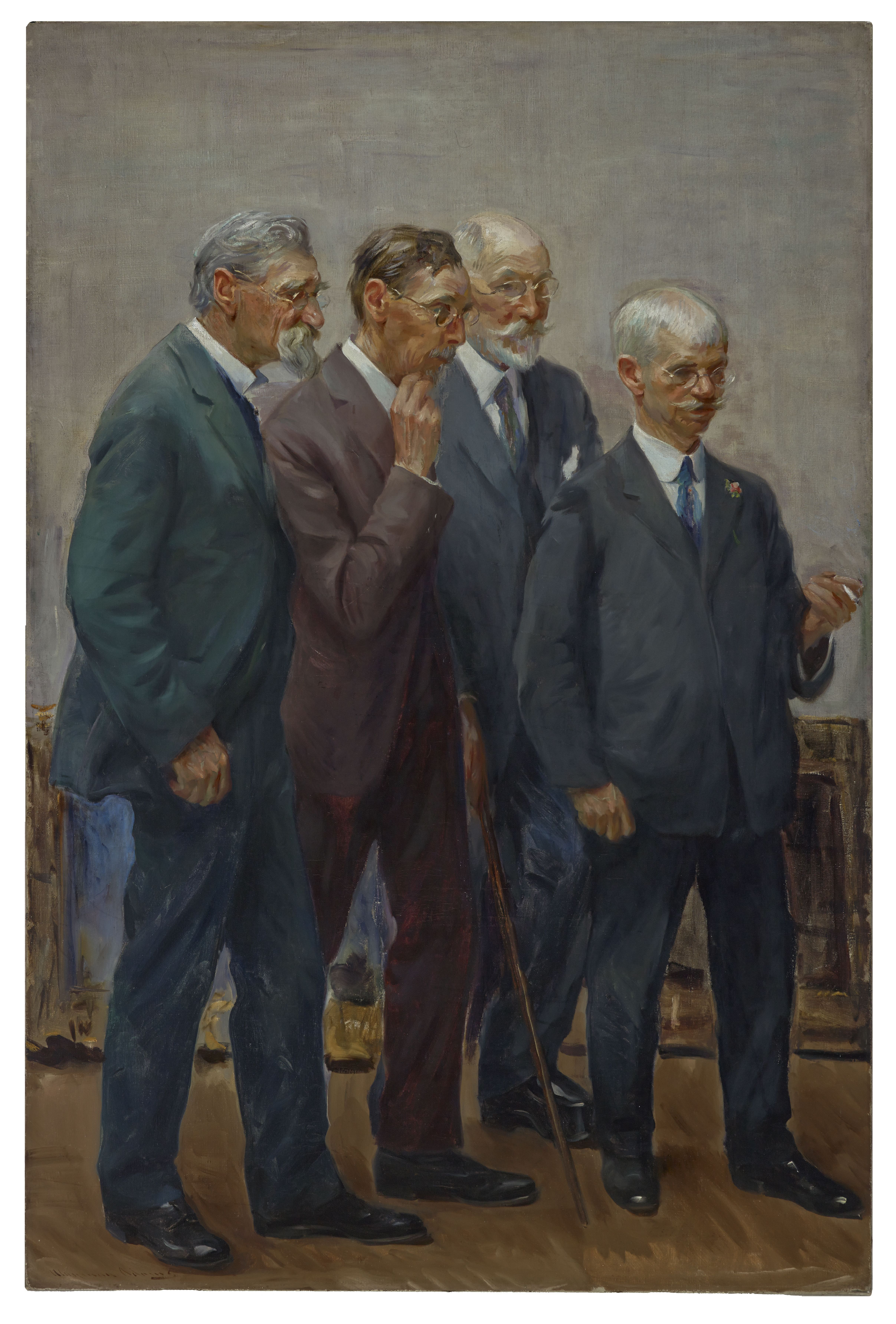
Steele pictured to the far left in the painting "The Art Jury" by Wayman Elbridge Adams

=== Munich, Germany ===
To help Steele obtain additional art training in Europe, his friend and art patron, Herman Lieber, arranged to provide financial support for the family so Steele could study at the Academy of Fine Arts, Munich. In exchange for future paintings from Steele, thirteen patrons each pledged $100 to support Steele’s studies. In 1880 the Steele family sailed to Europe with fellow Hoosiers J. Ottis Adams, Carrie Wolf, August Metzner, and Samuel Richards. The group was joined two years later by Hoosier artist William Forsyth. In addition to training at the Royal Academy under the instruction of artists Gyula Benczúr and Ludwig Löfftz, Steele spent hours studying paintings of the Old Masters in Munich’s Alte Pinakothek galleries. He also painted in the countryside with his family and other artists, including Boston landscape painter J. Frank Currier. Steele enjoyed plein air, or outdoor painting, which is reflected in many of his landscapes. At Steele’s request, his sponsors extended their financial support so that he could continue studies in Munich for two more years. Steele also used funds earned from painting copies of Old Masters to pay for several additional months before the family returned to Indiana in 1885.

=== Central Indiana ===
Upon their return to Indianapolis, the Steele family rented the Tinker mansion (Talbott Place) at Sixteenth and Pennsylvania Streets. Steele kept a studio downtown, where he could paint and display his work while he earned a living primarily as a portrait painter and art teacher. Around 1886 Steele had a studio built on the Tinker property, and the home, already an Indianapolis landmark, became a hub for the local arts community.

Steele’s paintings showed a notable change in style after his return from Munich. Steele’s Munich paintings sported dark, drab colors and high contrasts, but his work in Indiana gradually shifted toward a brighter, more vivid color palette. Steele was especially interested in capturing the beauty of nature through expressions of light and color. His paintings included both urban and rural scenes and depicted changes of season as well as weather conditions of snow, rain, and sunshine. Steele's works show a "sympathetic" and "technical grasp of his subjects" with a "comprehension of the majestic aspects of nature" with "much feeling for the influence of light and atmosphere."

In addition to local exhibitions, Steele’s art appeared outside of Indiana, including the Eighth Annual Exhibition of the prestigious Society of American Artists at the Metropolitan Museum of Art in New York City in 1886. During the summer months, Steele took his family to the country, where he painted rural landscapes. The Muscatatuck River near Vernon, Indiana, was a favorite locale. Fellow landscape artist Forsyth frequently accompanied Steele on these expeditions. Steele also painted in Vermont and Tennessee, where he had taken his first wife, Libby, in hopes of improving her health.

The 1890s were a turning point in Steele’s career. In 1890 Steele published The Steele Portfolio, which contained twenty-five photogravure prints of his paintings, including The Boatman, his prize-winning student work from Munich. In 1891 Forsyth joined Steele as an instructor at the Indiana Art School, which Steele established in 1889. Steele continued to teach there until 1895, before returning to painting on a full-time basis. In November 1894 the Art Association of Indianapolis sponsored the Exhibit of Summer Work by Steele, Forsyth, Richard B. Gruelle, and Otto Stark. The exhibition so impressed art critic and novelist Hamlin Garland that he arranged to have the exhibition shown in Chicago. Sponsored by the Central Art Association, the Indiana exhibit, called Five Hoosier Painters, expanded to include paintings by Adams. This Chicago exhibition is credited with launching the careers of the Hoosier Group of Indiana painters.

Throughout the 1890s, Steele painted landscapes during the warm months and returned to a winter studio to paint portraits, still his primary source of income. In addition, Steele actively exhibited his work, delivered lectures, and helped organize the Society of Western Artists, whose annual exhibition attracted national attention. Steele later became the organization’s president. Steele painted outdoors near Vernon, then moved on to Bloomington in Monroe County, Indiana, and Metamora in Franklin County, Indiana, where he did some of his best work. The area around Metamora was instrumental in the development of Hoosier landscape painting. Fellow landscape painters Adams, Forsyth, Stark and others joined Steele as he painted outdoors. In 1898 Steele and Adams bought a home in Brookville, Indiana, eight miles east of Metamora, so they could be closer to the area’s scenic beauty. Named The Hermitage, the home was quiet, secluded, and provided a place where the artists could work without interruption. In 1899 Steele became a member of the jury that selected American paintings for inclusion in the Paris Universal Exposition in 1900, a world’s fair expected to attract millions of visitors. Sadly, Steele's wife, Libby, died at the age of forty-nine in November 1899.

The new century marked a number of changes in Steele’s life. In 1900 he received an honorary Master of Arts degree from Wabash College in Crawfordsville, Indiana. That same year the Art Association of Indianapolis received a large donation from John Herron to establish a museum and art school in the city. The association selected the Tinker mansion, Steele’s home in Indianapolis, and purchased the property from his landlord. Steele’s art studio became the first Herron School of Art. Steele leased another home on East Saint Clair Street in Indianapolis. Portrait commissions remained a major source of income for Steele and his subjects included poet James Whitcomb Riley, the official portraits of several Indiana governors, President Benjamin Harrison, and other prominent Hoosiers.

In 1902 Steele and his daughter, Daisy, traveled to the West Coast to visit family in Oregon and Redlands, California. The cross-county trip inspired Steele to paint more than a dozen exceptional works of art. He entered several of his West Coast paintings in the Society of Western Artists’ Sixth Annual Exhibition, which was well received by art critics. Steele and his daughter made another cross-country trip in 1903. A year later Steele was invited to be a juror on the selection committee of the Louisiana Purchase Exposition, the 1904 world’s fair at Saint Louis. Four of Steele’s paintings were selected for the exposition and an additional five paintings were shown in the Indiana Building. At home in Indianapolis, Steele became actively involved in plans for the Art Association’s new museum, serving as chair of the acquisitions committee. The Tinker house was demolished in 1905 to make space for the Herron Art Institute. In 1906 Steele sold his interest in The Hermitage at Brookville to Adams and returned to Indianapolis, where he remained active in the arts community.

=== Brown County, Indiana ===
==== T. C. Steele home and studio ====
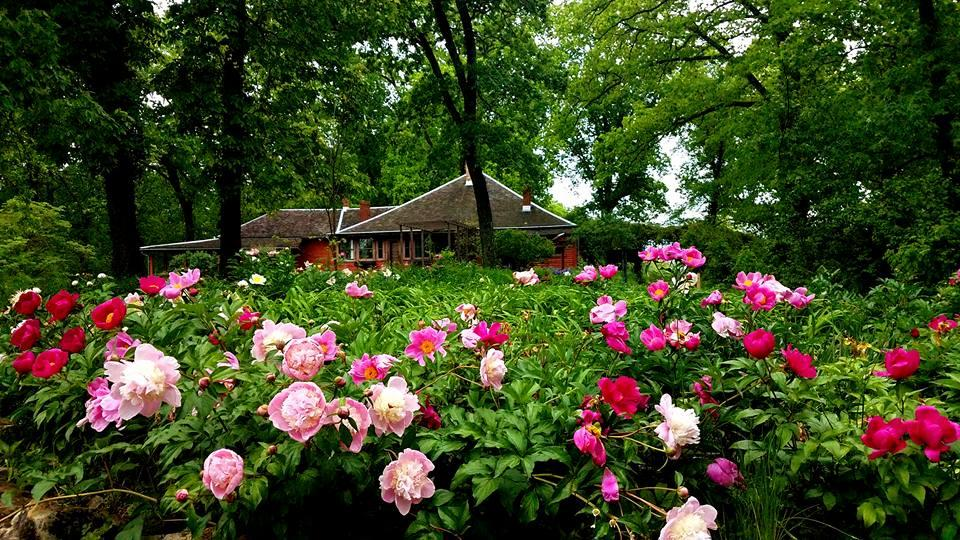
T. C. Steele home and studio

As Steele explored new places to paint, he discovered an isolated area of Brown County, Indiana, where he built a hilltop studio-home on 60 acres (24 hectares) of land one and a half miles south of Belmont, between Bloomington and Nashville, Indiana. Steele moved into the new summer residence with his second wife, Selma, in August 1907. Inspired by the breezes blowing through the cottage’s screened porches, they named it the House of the Singing Winds. The land, while not suitable for agricultural purpose, provided Steele with "beautiful picturesque woods and hills and valleys."

Slowly, over time, the Steeles developed their Brown County property, acquiring additional acreage to increase it to a total of 211 acres (85 hectares) of land, and making further improvements to include an enlarged home and surround it with beautiful gardens, a barn-sized studio-gallery, and several other outbuildings. The couple made it their year-round residence in 1912.

Shortly before Selma's death in 1945, she donated the property on 211 acres (85 hectares) of land to the Indiana Department of Conservation (the present-day Indiana Department of Natural Resources) to establish a state historic site in memory of her husband. The property was listed on the National Register of Historic Places in 1973 as the Theodore Clement Steele House and Studio. The Indiana Department of Natural Resources operated the T. C. Steele State Historic Site until the Indiana State Museum and Historic Sites took over site management. The site is open to the public and offers guided tours of the home and studio.

Steele kept a studio in Indianapolis, but his home in rural Brown County increasingly attracted visitors and other artists to the area. Despite its remote location, visitors came out of curiosity to see the scenic beauty surrounding the painter's home. Steele's presence in Brown County, along with other full-time resident artists such as Will Vawter, Gustave Baumann, Dale Bessire, and others, helped attract newcomers to the growing Brown County Art Colony.

Steele's reputation in the art world continued to rise. In 1913 he was elected as an associate artist to the National Academy of Design in New York, confirming Steele's standing as the most famous Hoosier artist of his time. Three of his paintings were accepted in the prestigious Panama–Pacific International Exposition in San Francisco, California, in 1915.

== Later years ==
In 1922 Steele accepted an appointment as Indiana University’s first artist in residence. Steele and his wife, Selma, rented a home in Bloomington, Indiana, during the winter months, but returned to their home in Brown County each summer. On campus Steele kept a studio on the top floor of IU's University Library (now Franklin Hall), where he and his wife greeted visitors and students could watch him paint.

Steele continued to exhibit his art, including a major exhibition called the Hoosier Salon, held in Chicago and organized by The Daughters of Indiana. He also maintained a busy lecture schedule.

== Death and legacy ==
In December 1925, Steele suffered a heart attack. Although he recovered and continued to paint, he became ill the following June and died at home in Brown County on July 24, 1926. His ashes were buried on a hillside that was reserved for a family cemetery (the T. C. Steele Memorial Cemetery) on the Steeles' property near Belmont in Brown County, Indiana.

== Honors and tributes ==
- Steele was awarded an honorary doctorate from Indiana University in 1916.
- The Indiana State Library and Historical Bureau has erected two historical markers to honor Steele's contributions.
  - One marker, installed in 1992, honors the artist, along with his home and studio in Brown County, Indiana.
  - The second marker, installed in 2015, honors Steele's contributions and his former Indianapolis residence, which became the site of the John Herron Art Institute.
- In 2016, as part of Indiana's bicentennial celebration, the Indiana Historical Society presented "Indiana Impressions: The Art of T. C. Steele" as a tribute to the Hoosier painter, whom art experts consider as the state's best-known landscape artist. The exhibition in Indianapolis included forty-three of his paintings from private collections.

== Selected works ==
Notable landscapes and portraits:

- The Boatman (1884) won a silver medal while Steele was a student at the Royal Academy in Munich.
- On the Muscatatuk (1886) was selected to appear in the World's Columbian Exposition in Chicago in 1893.
- September (1892) was selected to appear in the World's Columbian Exposition in Chicago in 1893.
- Bloom of the Grape (1893) received an honorable mention at the Paris Exposition in 1900.
- November Morning (1904) was selected to appear at the Louisiana Purchase Exposition in 1904 in Saint Louis.
- The Old Mills (1903) was selected to appear at the Louisiana Purchase Exposition in 1904 in Saint Louis.
- The Cloud received the Richmond (Indiana) Art Museum’s Mary T. R. Foulke prize in 1906.
- The Belmont Road, Late Autumn received the Richmond Art Museum’s Mary T. R. Foulke prize in 1910.
- A March Morning received the Fine Arts Building prize at the Fourteenth Society of Western Artists’ annual exhibition in 1909.
- The Hill Country, Brown County received the Rector Prize at the Hoosier Salon exhibition in 1926.
- Benjamin Harrison (1900)
- Eli Lilly (1910)
- James Whitcomb Riley (1891)

== Public collections ==
- Art Museum of Greater Lafayette (Lafayette, Indiana): Winter in the Ravine
- David Owsley Museum of Art Ball State University (Muncie, Indiana): Tennessee Mountain Land, and other paintings
- Haan Mansion Museum of Indiana Art (Lafayette, Indiana): numerous paintings
- Indiana Historical Society (Indianapolis): Robert Mansur Wulsin
- Indiana Memorial Union (Indiana University, Bloomington): numerous paintings
- Indiana State Museum (Indianapolis): public exhibition with numerous paintings
- Indiana University Art Museum (Bloomington): numerous paintings
- Indianapolis Museum of Art: Village of Schliersee, Highlands, and other paintings as well as works on paper
- Los Angeles County Museum of Art: Sunlight, Late Summer
- Maier Museum of Art at Randolph College (Lynchburg, Virginia): Autumn Landscape
- President Benjamin Harrison Home (Indianapolis): Benjamin Harrison
- Richmond Art Museum (Richmond, Indiana): In the Whitewater Valley, Near Metamora, 1899
- Swope Art Museum (Terre Haute, Indiana)
- T. C. Steele State Historic Site (Brown County, Indiana): numerous paintings
