= Hoosier Group =

American group of painters

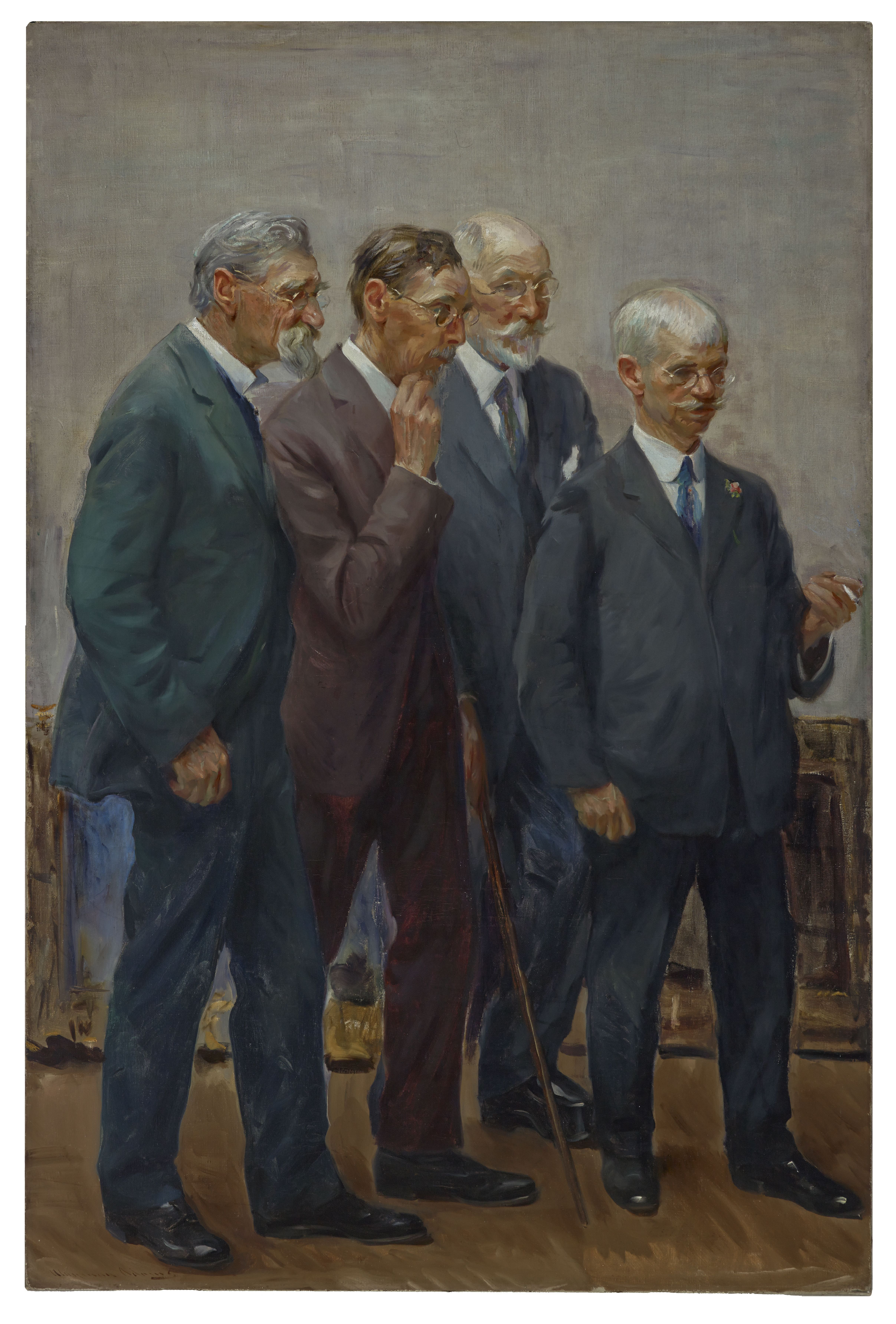
Four of the five Hoosier Group artists in the painting "The Art Jury" by Wayman Elbridge Adams. From left to right are Steele, Stark, Adams, and Forsyth. Gruelle was deceased at the time the picture was painted.

The Hoosier Group was a group of Indiana Impressionist painters working in the late 19th and early 20th centuries. Artists considered members of the Group include T. C. Steele, Richard Gruelle, William Forsyth, J. Ottis Adams, and Otto Stark. Together they are primarily known for their renditions of the Indiana landscape.

Although the members of the group had disparate backgrounds and training, the Group gained its cohesion from the determination of the five to attend art school in Munich in the late 1880s. Following their return to Indiana, the group dominated the Indiana art scene through the 1920s. Forsyth, Steele, and Adams taught art at academies in the state and helped spread the group's ethos. Hoosier Group artists all exhibited regularly in the state for several decades thereafter and were instrumental in forming the Society of Western Artists.

Following the appearance of Modernism at the 1913 Armory Show in New York City and later Chicago, the Hoosier Group's visibility and sales declined dramatically. During this period, members of the group were aging and found themselves trapped in what became characterized at that time as an old-fashioned style of painting. Today, the works are highly-collectible and are found in many private and public collections around the United States. A number of collections, primarily in Indiana, include the works of all five. These include: Haan Mansion Museum of Indiana Art in Lafayette; Indianapolis Museum of Art, the Shortridge/Indianapolis Public Schools Collection at the Indiana State Museum, the Columbia Club in Indianapolis; Sidney and Lois Eskenazi Museum of Art in Bloomington; the Richmond Art Museum in Richmond; David Owsley Museum of Art in Muncie; the Swope Art Museum in Terre Haute; and DePauw University in Greencastle.

== See also ==
- Irvington Group
- Richmond Group
