= Society of Western Artists (1896–1914) =

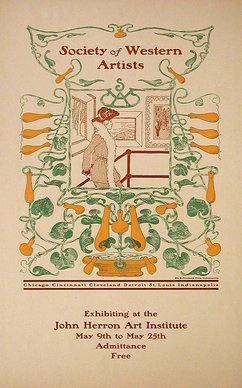
A 1909 poster for an exhibit by the society in Indianapolis.

The Society of Western Artists was founded by William Forsyth, T. C. Steele, J. Ottis Adams, John Elwood Bundy and fourteen other artists in 1896. Most of these were painters, Impressionists, primarily active in the American Midwest.

Other members included Frank J. Girardin, Frank Reaugh and Mathias Alten, and the miniature portraitist Edward William Carlson.

The Society of Western Artists "was organized in 1896 for the purpose of uniting artists in fellowship and of combining their efforts in the advancement of Art. As one of the means to this end the Society gathers together, annually, a collection of representative works, chiefly done in the middle west, and exhibits the collection in various cities."

== Development as a society ==
"The Society of Western Artists feels that it has passed beyond its first youth, and that it can afford to take upon itself a more critical and dignified attitude."—Edmund H. Wuerpel

== Exhibitions ==
Annual exhibitions traveled to U.S. cities which included Chicago, Cincinnati, Cleveland, Detroit, Indianapolis, St. Louis and later Columbus, Pittsburgh, and Toledo.

Among these exhibitions were:

- Sixth Annual Exhibition of the Society of Western Artists - March 4 to March 20, 1902 - The Art Institute of Chicago
- Eighteenth Annual Exhibition of the Society of Western Artists - December 31st to January 25th, 1914 - The Art Institute of Chicago
