= William Forsyth (artist) =

American Impressionist painter

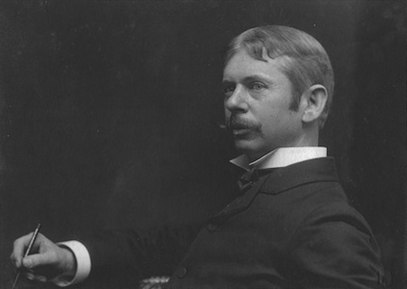
- Forsyth in 1898
- Born: 1854; California, Ohio, U.S.
- Died: March 29, 1935 (aged 80–81); Indianapolis, Indiana, U.S.
- Resting place: Crown Hill Cemetery and Arboretum Section 39, Lot 298; 39.8183284°N 86.165859°W
- Occupation: Painter

William J. Forsyth (1854 – March 29, 1935) was an American Impressionist painter who was part of the "Hoosier Group" of Indiana artists.

Forsyth was the first student of the Indiana School of Art in Indianapolis and entered the Munich Academy along with T. C. Steele and J. Ottis Adams in 1882. He later returned to Indiana in 1888 and was instrumental in founding the Herron School of Art in Indianapolis, serving as an instructor there until 1933. He died March 29, 1935, and was buried in Section 39, Lot 298 Crown Hill Cemetery in Indianapolis, Indiana. Driving east from the south-west corner of Section 39, a pink granite monument has been erected to honor the memory of Forsyth (several rows back), together with a bronze bas-relief portrait of the artist (attached thereto).

Forsyth is one of the five members of Indiana's most important group of artists, the Hoosier Group. His work is in many important private collections and several museums including the Haan Mansion Museum of Indiana Art, Indiana State Museum, and Indianapolis Museum of Art.

== Background ==
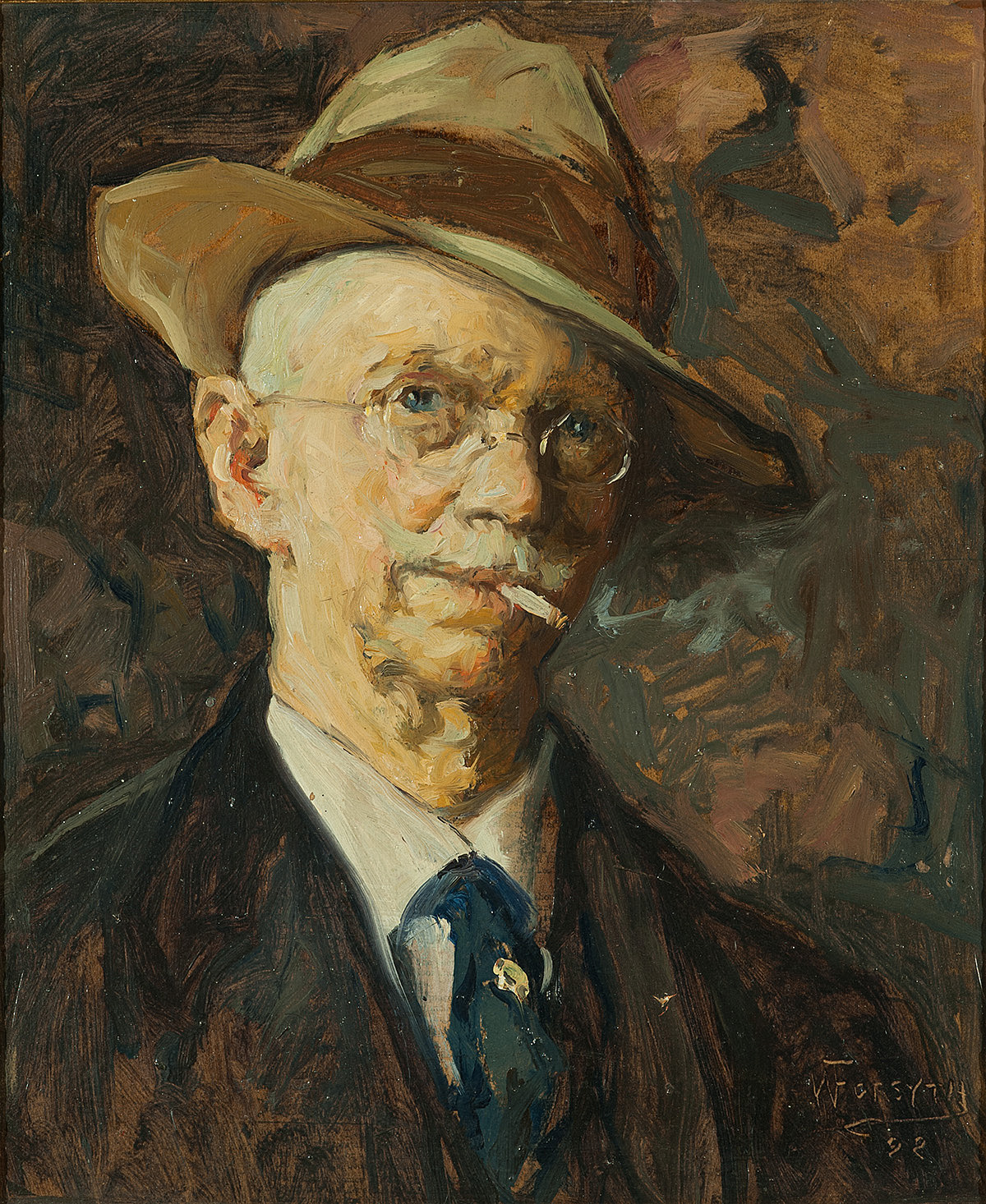
Self-portrait, 1923

It was perhaps no accident that William Forsyth described his teacher, John Love, as a "tall, . . . blond giant". He was the opposite, and many of his friends and students, and even his daughters, thought that explained a lot about his personality, described by one as that of a "little cocky bantam rooster" whose stature was shorter than most men, which many believed was the catalyst to a "feisty way about him, to make up for his height." (Judith Vale Newton, The Hoosier Group, Indianapolis: Eckert Publications, 1985, 131.)

Forsyth's "feistiness" earned a reputation for a quick temper and for being "ornery", a lover of a good argument. Wilbur Peat, describing the Indianapolis art scene in the 1870s in his "Pioneer Painters of Indiana," remarked that "it is doubtful if the city had anyone among its youthful citizens, with so much zeal for things artistic as he (Forsyth), and with such determination to reach the top in the practice of painting" (p. 205). Short in stature, Forsyth became very well known in the history of art in Indiana, and especially among those artists buried at Crown Hill.

== Early life ==
Forsyth was born in 1854 in California, Ohio, a small town along the Ohio River, not far from Cincinnati. The view of the river was among his earliest memories, and to see it again in his adult life, always elicited a wave of strong emotions. Much like Jacob Cox, he soon began drawing on any canvas that was available, which at first was too often the walls of the family home. But rather than punish him, his parents assigned a large mantel in a vacant room, especially painted black for the purpose, as the appropriate place for his artistic expressions. Among the scenes Forsyth recalled sketching there with colored chalks were pictures of the Civil War soldiers he would see marching home past as he played outside.

When he was 10 years old, the family moved to Versailles, Indiana, before coming to Indianapolis just a few years later. At the age of 15, he talked his father into letting him study art with Barton S. Hays, who, with Jacob Cox, was one of the city's leading artists and a teacher of William Merritt Chase and John Washington Love, but the lessons were too expensive for him to continue.

In 1873, he and his brother John began a business painting houses. He used his free time to hang around artists' studios and visit galleries, traveling as far as New York. He often painted in the countryside, occasionally running across Love, who would be doing the same thing with some of his students. When Love and Gookins opened their Indiana School of Art in 1877, Forsyth was the first student to enroll, and because of his growing friendship with Love, and his becoming an assistant instructor after Gookins departed, he was the last to leave. To fill the void left by the school's closing, Forsyth and other local artists, including Charles Joseph Fiscus (1861–1884), Frederick A. Hetherington (1859–1931), Thomas E. Hibben (1859–1915), Charles Nicolai (1856–1942), and Frank Edwin Scott (1863–1929) formed the Bohé Club (Bohemian Club was too long to fit on a sign on the door window). This allowed them to maintain some studio space in the same building the art school had been in, and to have a place to gather in which to discuss art and to sally forth from as they traveled on sketching tours south of Indianapolis to places such as Brown County, Indiana.

== Studies in Europe ==
Forsyth continued to desire more formal training as an artist. His close friend, Theodore Clement Steele, was already studying abroad in Munich, Germany, and when another good friend, Thomas Hibben, whose family owned a local dry goods store, offered to finance Forsyth's own studies abroad in exchange for one-half of the paintings he did while abroad, he packed according to Steele's recommendations and was soon studying with Steele at the Royal Academy of Munich. Munich, besides being where Steele was already, was both cheaper and more accepting of foreigners than the schools of Paris.

His formal studies there began in April 1882. Frequent letters to Hibben describe much about the progress of both Forsyth and Steele, and the financial strains of study abroad. Forsyth and Steele used their summer vacations to paint as they traveled around Europe, and then send the paintings home to Hibben to sell at exhibitions such as one he conducted late in 1885 at the English Hotel called "An Art Exhibit of the Hoosier Colony in Muchen". These letters also revealed Forsyth's goal as an artist. Of one teacher, Forsyth writes: "To certain extent his influence is for good, and I shall try to get all the good out of him I can, but as for becoming [like him], that is out of the question. I'll be myself or nothing." (quoted by Judith Vale Newton, The Hoosier Group, 121.)

This is a precursor of how his daughter, Constance Forsyth, an artist in her own right, summed up his career: "Perhaps his most outstanding characteristic was his independence. He painted what he wanted to paint and in the way he wanted to paint it. He preferred to work in his own way, regardless of what other artists were exploiting in the way of styles and fads. He was never the kind of artist that followed theories or intellectual ideas about what or how to paint. He very early, before studying abroad, developed his own brush technique which varied very little over the years. Even though the general look of his work changed over periods of time, that same technique was still there."

Another letter foretells his future involvement with a group of artists whose goal would be to interpret a particular region "in all the varying moods that are its charm" to the world at large: "Love Hoosierdom? I should think so, there's many a woodland nook and breezy field and quiet brookside that is consecrated ground to me."

== Career ==
Forsyth finished his studies in the spring of 1886 but stayed in Europe another two years, sharing a studio with J. Ottis Adams, who would also later be called one of the Hoosier Group. Returning to Indiana in September 1888, he was soon assisting Adams at an art school in Fort Wayne. Growing tired of the commute, the two opened their own school in Muncie, where Adams was living, in the fall of 1889. While there, he became the teacher of well-known American Impressionist painter Francis Focer Brown and his wife Beulah H. Brown. But Forsyth left after the spring term of 1891 to live again in Indianapolis. Here he joined Steele, and became a principal instructor in Steele's Indiana School of Art, which was located on the circle. Steele resigned in 1895, but Forsyth stayed on to teach both day and evening classes until June 1897, when the school was torn down to make way for an expansion of the English Hotel.

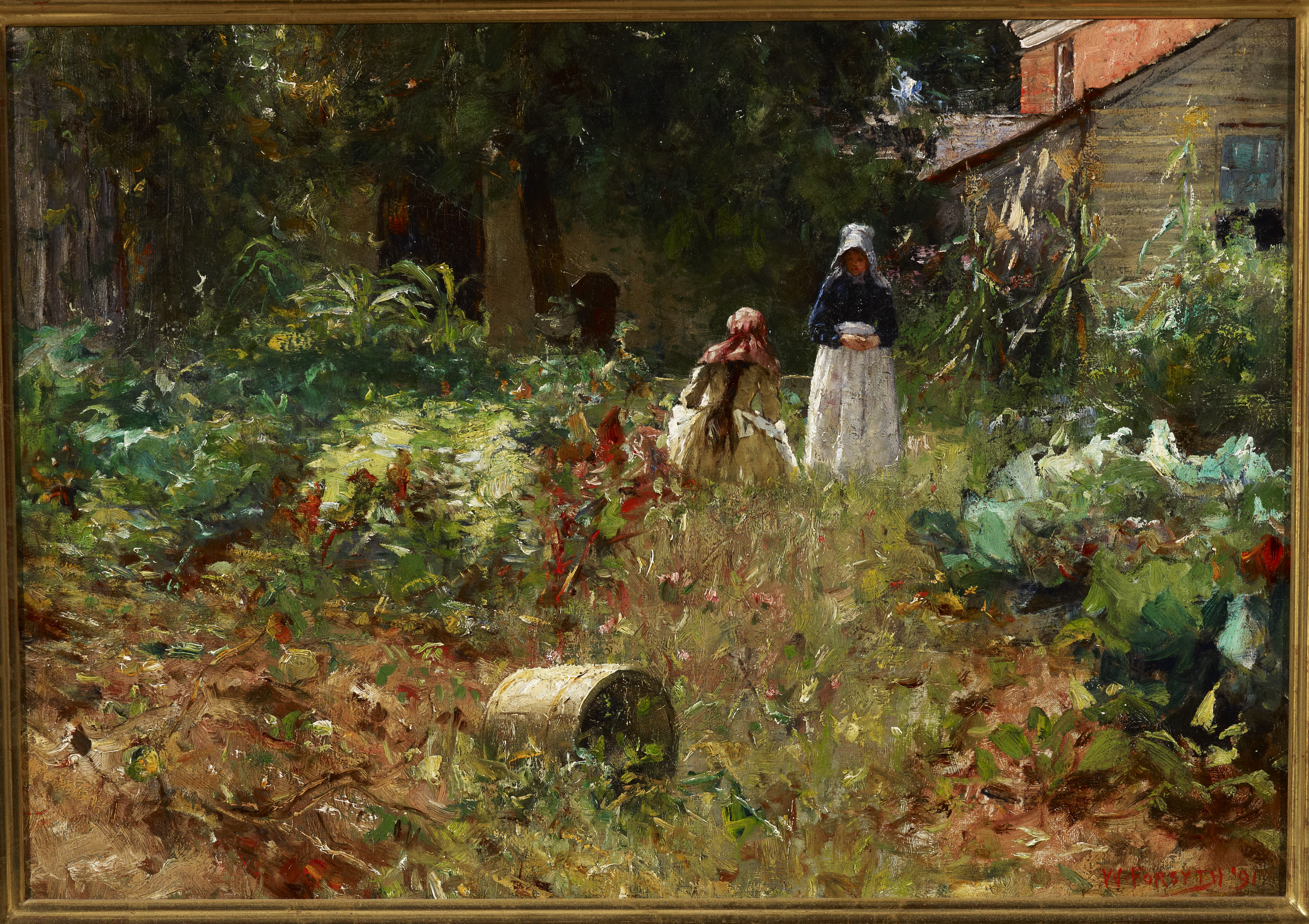
In the Garden, 1891

It was during this period that the 1894 exhibition of the works of Forsyth, Steele, Otto Stark, and Richard Gruelle at the Denison Hotel attracted the attention that led to the Hoosier Group exposition in Chicago, which also included works by Adams. The attention given to this exhibition, and the mood that had created it, led to his joining with Steele, Adams, and fifteen other Midwestern artists to form the Society of Western Artists in 1896. He remained a member until it disbanded in 1914 and participated in its annual shows, which were held all around the Midwest in order to guarantee the artists a place to show, and thus sell, their works each year.

As he had in Europe, Forsyth always reserved a few weeks in the summer in which to travel and paint with friends. In 1897, he brought along two of his sisters, and one of his pupils, Alice Atkinson. Chances are he brought his sisters along so that he could ask Alice to come too. The trip that year was to a friend's childhood home, a farm along the Ohio River near Brandenburg, Kentucky. When the time for painting wound down in the fall, William and Alice made their way up river to Louisville where they were married at the Grace Episcopal Church in Louisville on October 14, 1897. They returned to the farm for their honeymoon, and winter had set in before they made their way back to Indianapolis.

With the art school closed, Forsyth began offering classes on his own during the winter and spring months and painting in various places in Indiana and Kentucky during the summer. Three daughters were born: Dorothy in 1899, Constance in 1903, and Evelyn in 1906.

To provide the family with a more country feel all year round, he moved his family in the spring of 1906 from 938 Fletcher Avenue to 15 South Emerson Avenue in the small town of Irvington, with its winding wooded streets and Butler University campus. He attached a studio to the house and planted many gardens of flowers, eternally frustrated that his roses would never grow quite right.

In the fall of 1906, he joined the faculty of the Herron School of Art, replacing his friend J. Ottis Adams as the principal instructor of drawing and painting. The school had recently outgrown its beginnings in what had been an old house Steele had lived in at 16th and Pennsylvania, and had just moved into its new building at the same site. It was to be a long association, one from which his former students recalled him both as a fiery, sometimes tactless and sarcastic teacher, and as their lifelong friend and encourager. Forsyth's students included Florence Smithburn, Alice Woods Ullman, and Louise Zaring.

In 1914, Forsyth varied his usual summer schedule to supervise the painting of 33 murals throughout the Indianapolis City Hospital. He himself painted a large landscape for the entrance hall, while he enlisted Steele, Stark, Adams, and eleven other Hoosier artists to do works in other parts of the building, including many scenes of childhood stories for the Children's Ward. All of them worked for house painter's wages, and while Steele and Adams had provided works from their studios in southern Indiana, several of the artists lived at the hospital while executing their murals. For those involved, it seemed to capture the spirit of creating together that they had had in their earlier days but lost as success had led them each in more widely scattered directions.

== Later life and death ==
In 1933, the economic pressures of the Great Depression led the school's administrator to let him go, along with daughter Constance, Paul Hadley, and five other teachers. The students protested by hanging an effigy of the director from one of the trees on the campus.

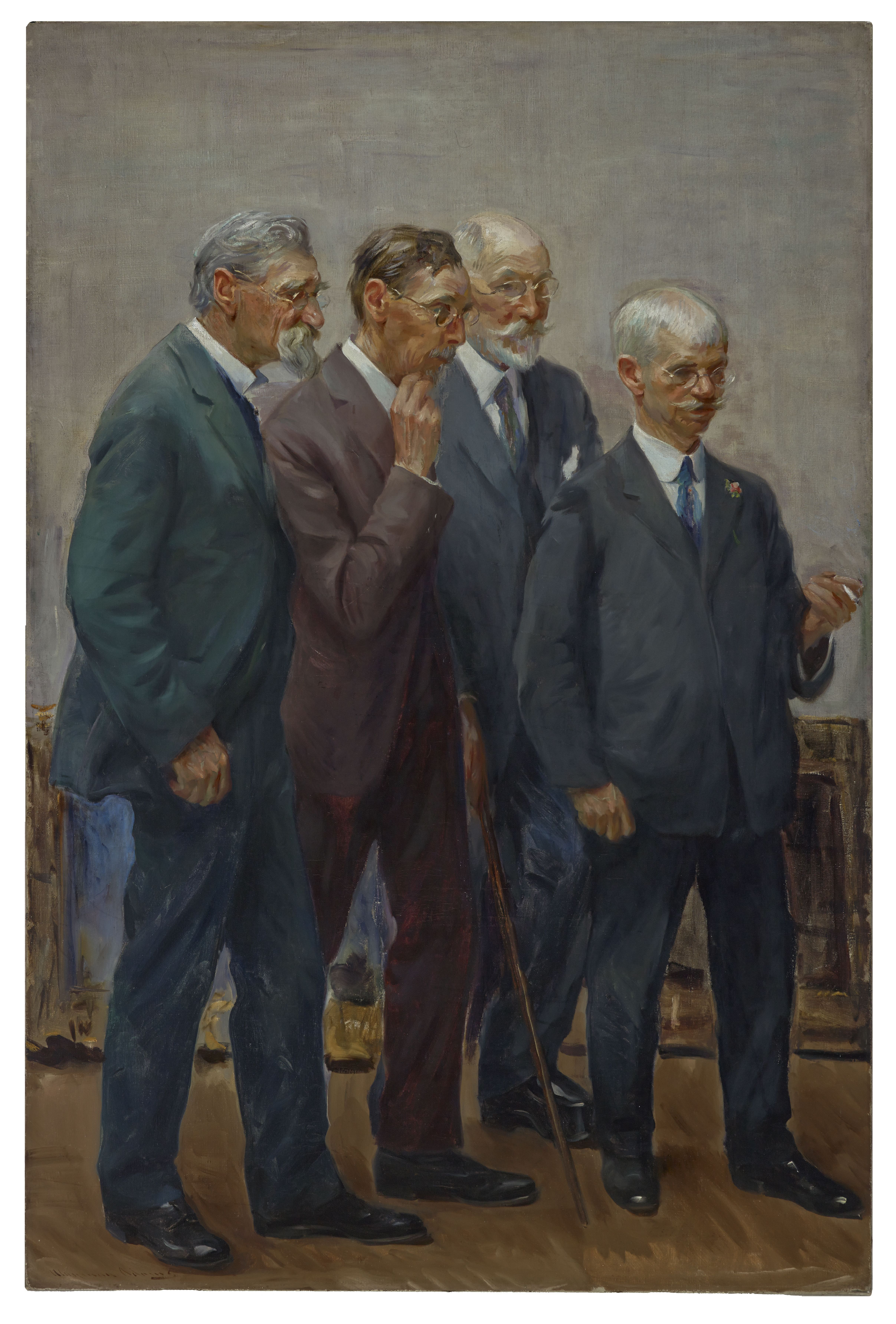
Forsyth pictured to the far right in the painting The Art Jury by Wayman Elbridge Adams

Forsyth, though well into his seventies, had not been prepared for his abrupt dismissal from Herron, either emotionally or financially. He received a commission for some Public Works Administration pieces for the Indiana State Library, two of which now hang on the fourth floor of the Indiana State Museum. His daughters Dorothy and Constance contributed financially, and Alice tried to make do with less.

In February 1934, he experienced a heart attack. Never recovering completely, he would sit outdoors as much as possible, surrounded by his family, friends, and flowers, and try to do a little painting each day. On March 29, 1935, he finally succumbed to kidney failure.

Forsyth, in his 1916 essay entitled "Art in Indiana", written for the state's centennial, was perhaps the best spokesman for this Hoosier group of artists and the following could easily serve as his epitaph:

To live out-of-doors in intimate touch with nature, to feel the sun, to watch the ever changing face of the landscape, where waters run and winds blow and trees wave and clouds move, and to walk with all the hours of the day and into the mysteries of night through all the seasons of the year---this is the heaven of the Hoosier Painter!
