= American Impressionism =

Style of painting

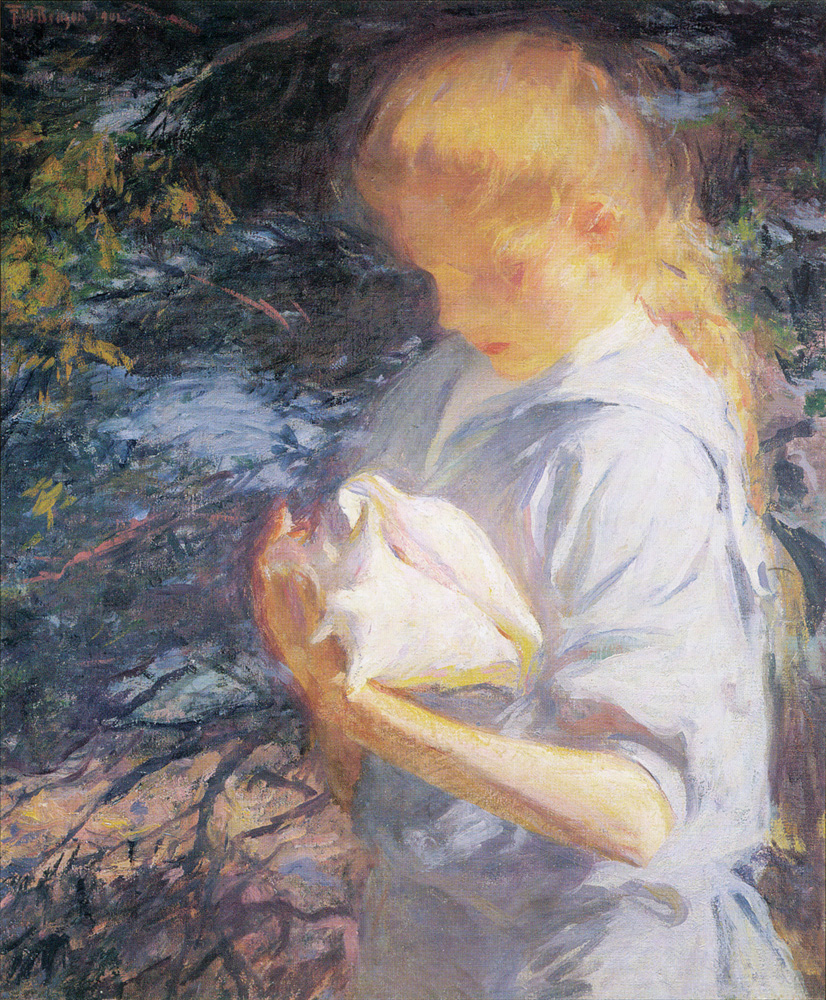
Frank W. Benson, Eleanor Holding a Shell, North Haven, Maine, 1902, private collection

American Impressionism was a style of painting related to European Impressionism and practiced by American artists in the United States from the mid-19th century through the beginning of the 20th. The style is characterized by loose brushwork and vivid colors with a wide array of subject matters but focusing on landscapes and upper-class domestic life.

== Emerging style ==
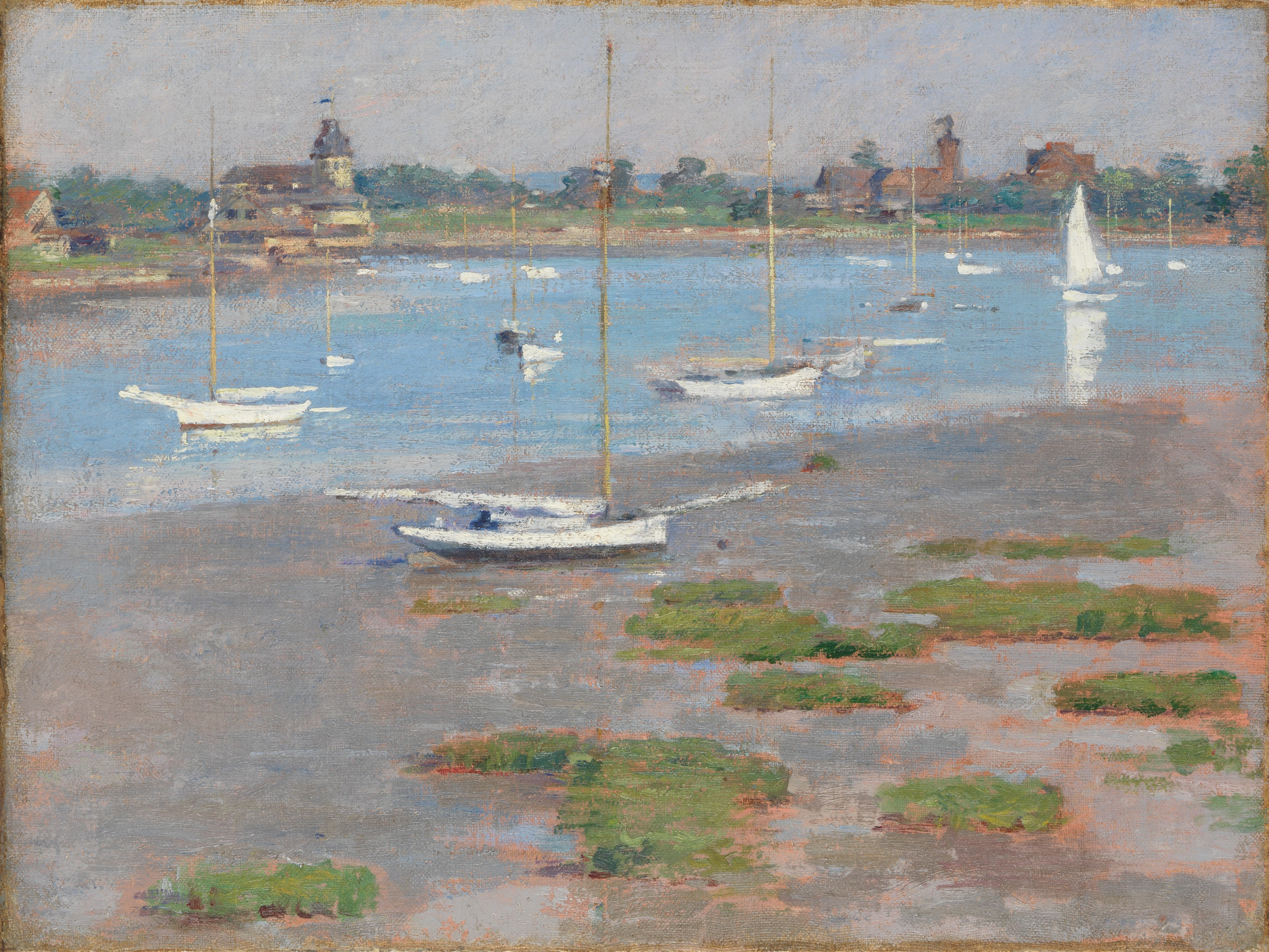
Theodore Robinson, Low Tide Riverside Yacht Club, (1894), Collection of Margaret and Raymond Horowitz

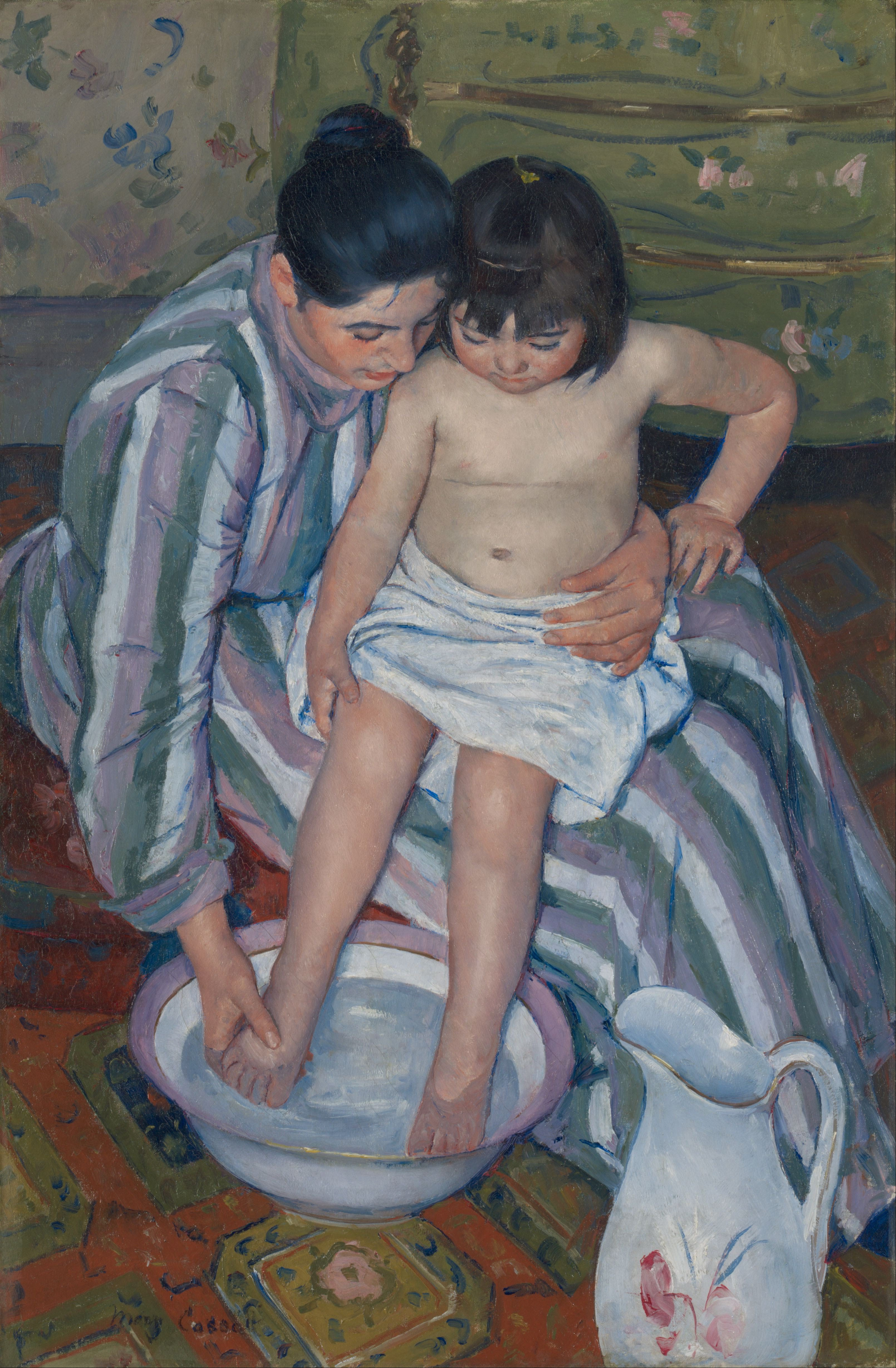
Mary Cassatt, The Child's Bath (1893)

Impressionism emerged as an artistic style in France in the 1860s. Major exhibitions of French impressionist works in Boston and New York in the 1880s introduced the style to the American public. The first exhibit took place in 1886 in New York and was presented by the American Art Association and organized by Paul Durand-Ruel . Some of the first American artists to paint in an impressionistic mode, such as Theodore Robinson and Mary Cassatt, did so in the late 1880s after visiting France and meeting with artists such as Claude Monet. Others, such as Childe Hassam, took notice of the increasing numbers of French impressionist works at American exhibitions.

Impressionism was initially unpopular in the United States. At the first exhibit in 1886, Americans were attracted to the landscape paintings but were offended by the realist figures and nudity depicted in other paintings. American artists were hesitant to adopt the style of Impressionism while studying in France as it was created as a radical rejection of tradition at the Academy and American artists hoped to gain acceptance through their traditional academy studies. Over time, American patrons began to accept the abstract forms of Impressionism, especially as American artists, such as Cassatt, began to adopt the styles of French Impressionism.

=== Mary Cassatt ===
Cassatt played a large role in the adoption of Impressionism by American patrons. Cassatt formed a close relationship with Edgar Degas, who, impressed by her work, invited her to show with the French Impressionists in 1877. She was the only American ever to exhibit her work alongside the original Impressionists in France. Through her connections to wealthy upperclass Americans, Cassatt convinced many of her friends of the artistic merits of Impressionism and encouraged the purchase of French works.

== Characteristics ==
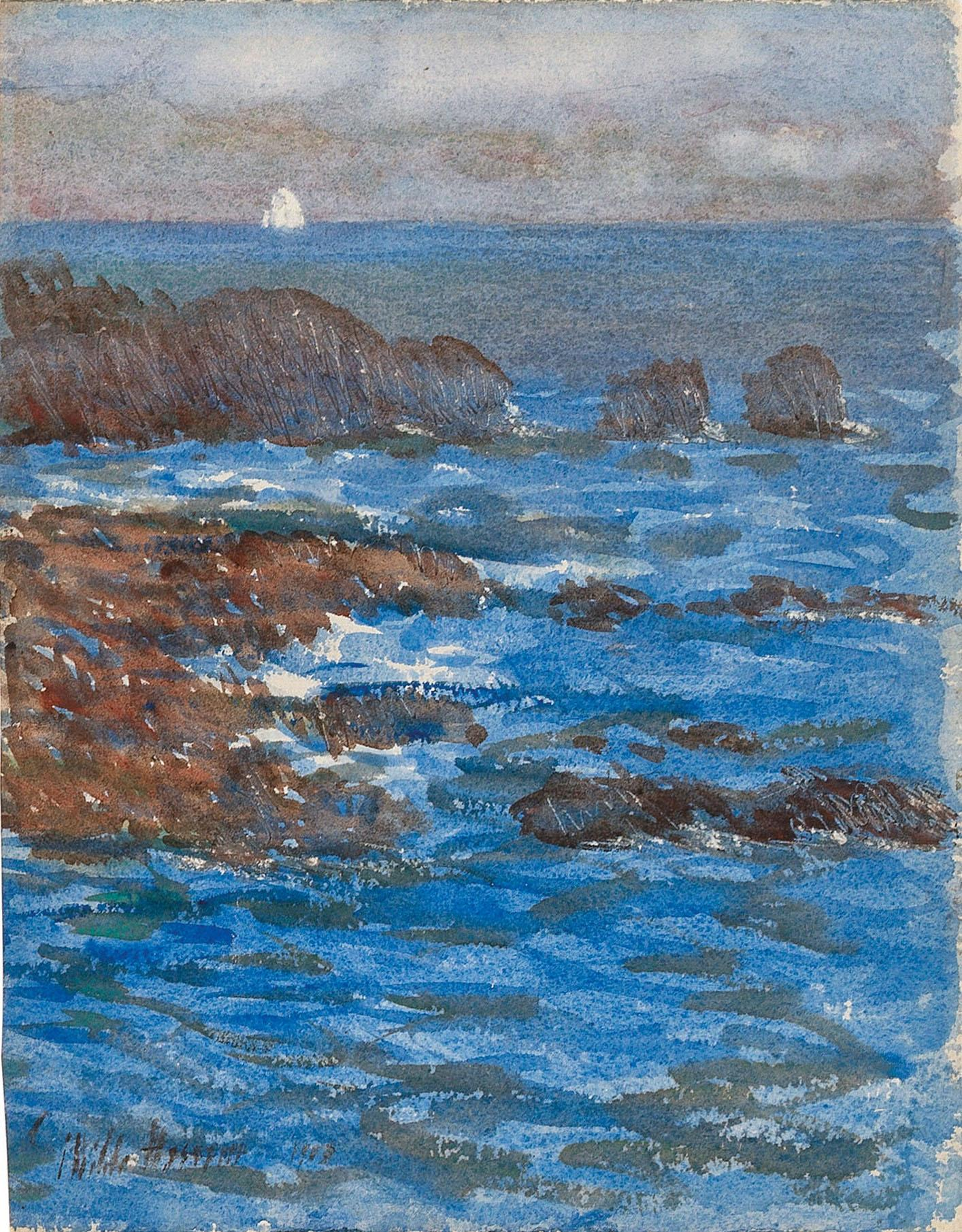
Childe Hassam, Cliffs and Sea, 1903, private collection

Unlike early Renaissance painters, American Impressionists favored asymmetrical composition, cropped figures, and plunging perspectives in their works in order to create a more "impressionist" version of the subject. In addition, American impressionists used pure color straight from the tubes to make the works more vibrant, used broken brushstrokes, and practiced "impasto"- a style of painting characterized by thick raised strokes. European impressionists painted tranquil scenes of landscapes or the lower and middle classes. American impressionists focused on landscapes like the European impressionists, but unlike their European counterparts, American impressionists also painted scenes of quiet domesticity, in contrast to the emergence of industrialization. As railroads, automobiles, and other new technologies emerged, American impressionists often painted vast landscapes and small towns in an effort to return to nature.

== Trailblazers ==
From the 1890s through the 1910s, American impressionism flourished in art colonies—loosely affiliated groups of artists who lived and worked together and shared a common aesthetic vision. Art colonies tended to form in small towns that provided affordable living, abundant scenery for painting, and relatively easy access to large cities where artists could sell their work. Some of the most important American impressionist artists gathered at Cos Cob and Old Lyme, Connecticut, both on Long Island Sound; Rockport, Massachusetts, with its harbor on the Atlantic Ocean; New Hope, Pennsylvania, on the Delaware River; and Brown County, Indiana. American impressionist artists also thrived in California at Carmel and Laguna Beach; in New York on eastern Long Island at Shinnecock, largely due to the influence of William Merritt Chase; and in Boston where Edmund Charles Tarbell and Frank Weston Benson became important practitioners of the impressionist style. Artists such as Harry Aiken Vincent chose to focus on harbors and seaside subjects to show the interplay of light between water and sky.

== Decline ==
Some American art colonies remained vibrant centers of impressionist art into the 1920s. But with the advent of the Ashcan School in 1910, the tides of the American art world started to change. Impressionism in America further lost its cutting-edge status in 1913 when a historic exhibition of modern art took place at the 69th Regiment Armory building in New York City. The “Armory Show”, as it came to be called, heralded a new painting style regarded as more in touch with the increasingly fast-paced and chaotic world, especially with the outbreak of World War I, The Great Depression and World War II.

== Notable artists ==
- John White Alexander (1856–1915)
- J. Ottis Adams (1851–1927)
- Lucy Bacon (1857–1932)
- George Herbert Baker (1878–1943)
- John Noble Barlow (1861–1917)
- Thomas P. Barnett (1870–1929)
- Reynolds Beal (1867–1951)
- Marilyn Bendell (1921–2003)
- Frank Weston Benson (1862–1951)
- Johann Berthelsen (1883–1972)
- Warren Eugene Brandon (1916–1977)
- John Leslie Breck (1860–1899)
- Matilda Browne (1869–1947)
- John Elwood Bundy (1853–1933)
- Dennis Miller Bunker (1861–1890)
- Theodore Earl Butler (1861–1936)
- Mary Cassatt (1844–1926)
- William Merritt Chase (1849–1916)
- Alson S. Clark (1876–1949)
- Colin Campbell Cooper (1856–1937)
- Paul Cornoyer (1864–1923)
- Joseph DeCamp (1858–1923)
- Thomas Dewing (1851–1938)
- George Dinckel (1890–1976)
- Frank DuMond (1865–1951)
- John Joseph Enneking (1841–1916)
- Carl Eytel (1862–1925)
- Pedro Figari (1861–1938)
- Frederick Carl Frieseke (1874–1939)
- Daniel Garber (1880–1958)
- Robert F. Gault (1898–1977) AWS
- Arthur Hill Gilbert (1893–1970)
- Edmund Greacen (1877–1949)
- Richard Gruelle (1851–1914)
- Childe Hassam (1859–1935)
- William Samuel Horton (1865–1936)
- Wilson Irvine (1869–1936)
- Charles S. Kaelin (1858–1929)
- Joseph Kleitsch (1882–1931) (California Impressionist)
- Albert Henry Krehbiel (1873–1945)
- William Langson Lathrop (1859–1938)
- Hayley Lever (1876–1958)
- Laura Muntz Lyall (1860–1930)
- Theodore Lukits (1897–1992)
- Victor Matson (1895–1972)
- Willard Metcalf (1858–1925)
- Richard Edward Miller (1875–1943)
- Abram Molarsky (1879–1955)
- Robertson Kirtland Mygatt (1861–1919)
- George Loftus Noyes (1864–1954)
- Frank Nuderscher (1880–1959)
- Leonard Ochtman (1854–1935)
- Julian Onderdonk (1882–1922)
- William McGregor Paxton (1869–1941)
- Edgar Alwin Payne (1883–1947)
- Clara Elsene Peck (1883–1968)
- Van Dearing Perrine (1869–1955)
- Lilla Cabot Perry (1848–1933)
- Fritz Poock (1877–1945)
- Edward Henry Potthast (1857–1927)
- Edward Willis Redfield (1869–1925)
- Robert Reid (1862–1929)
- Theodore Robinson (1852–1896)
- Edward Francis Rook (1870–1960)
- Guy Rose (1867–1925)
- Porfirio Salinas (1910–1973)
- John Singer Sargent (1856–1925)
- Paul Sawyier (1865–1917)
- Christian von Schneidau (1893–1976)
- Edward Simmons (1852–1931)
- Sueo Serisawa (1910–2004) (California Impressionist)
- Tim Solliday (born 1952)
- George Sotter (1879–1953)
- Anna Huntington Stanley (1864–1907)
- Otto Stark (1859–1926)
- T. C. Steele (1847–1926)
- Edmund Charles Tarbell (1862–1938)
- Ross Sterling Turner (1847–1915)
- John Henry Twachtman (1853–1902)
- Edward Charles Volkert (1871–1935)
- Robert Vonnoh (1858–1933)
- Clark Voorhees (1871–1933)
- Marion Wachtel (1875–1954)
- Fred Wagner (1860–1940)
- Martha Walter (1895–1976)
- J. Alden Weir (1852–1919)
- Catherine Wiley (1879–1958)
- Robert William Wood (1889–1979)
- Mary Agnes Yerkes (1886–1989)

== Gallery ==
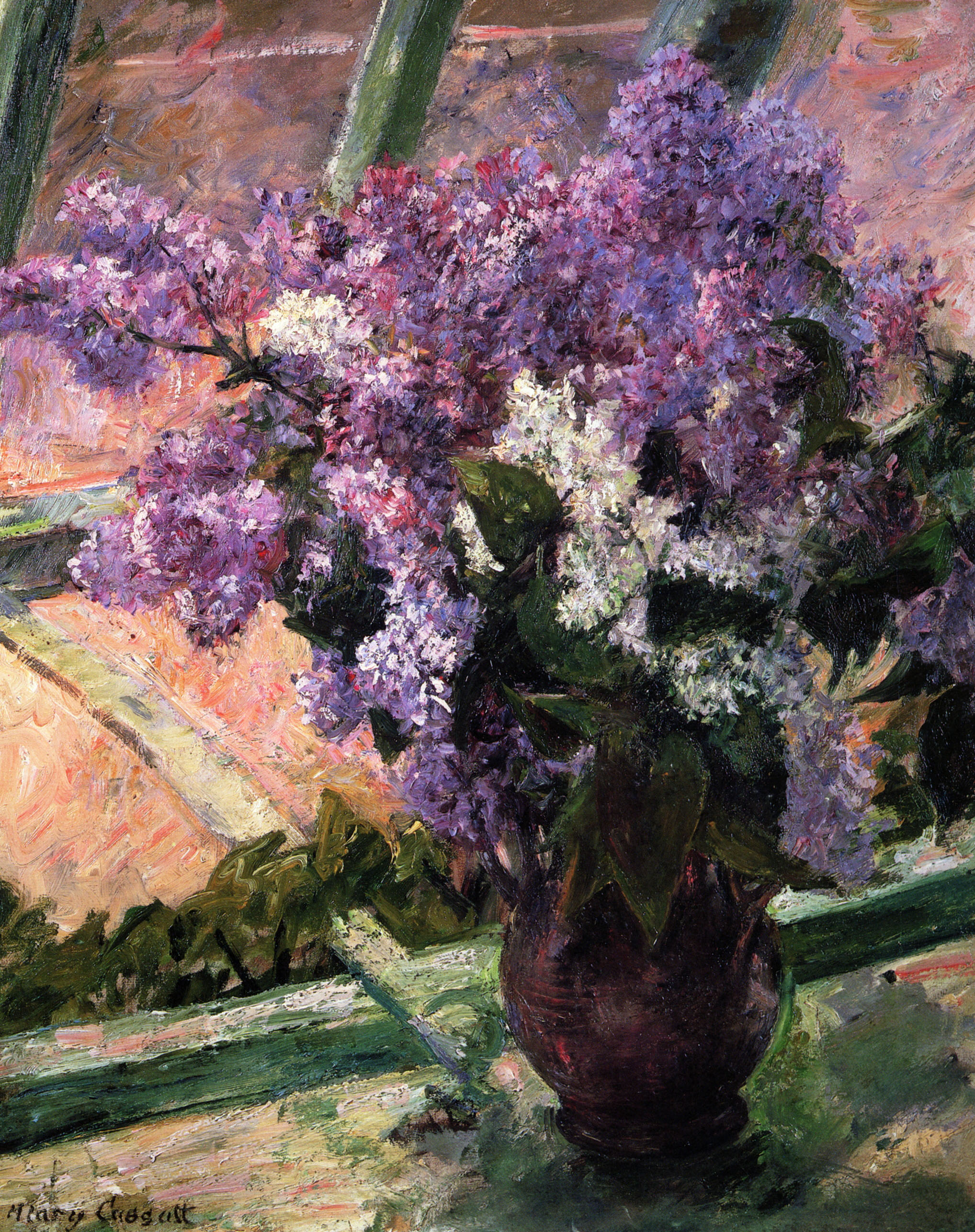
Mary Cassatt, Lilacs in a Window, 1880

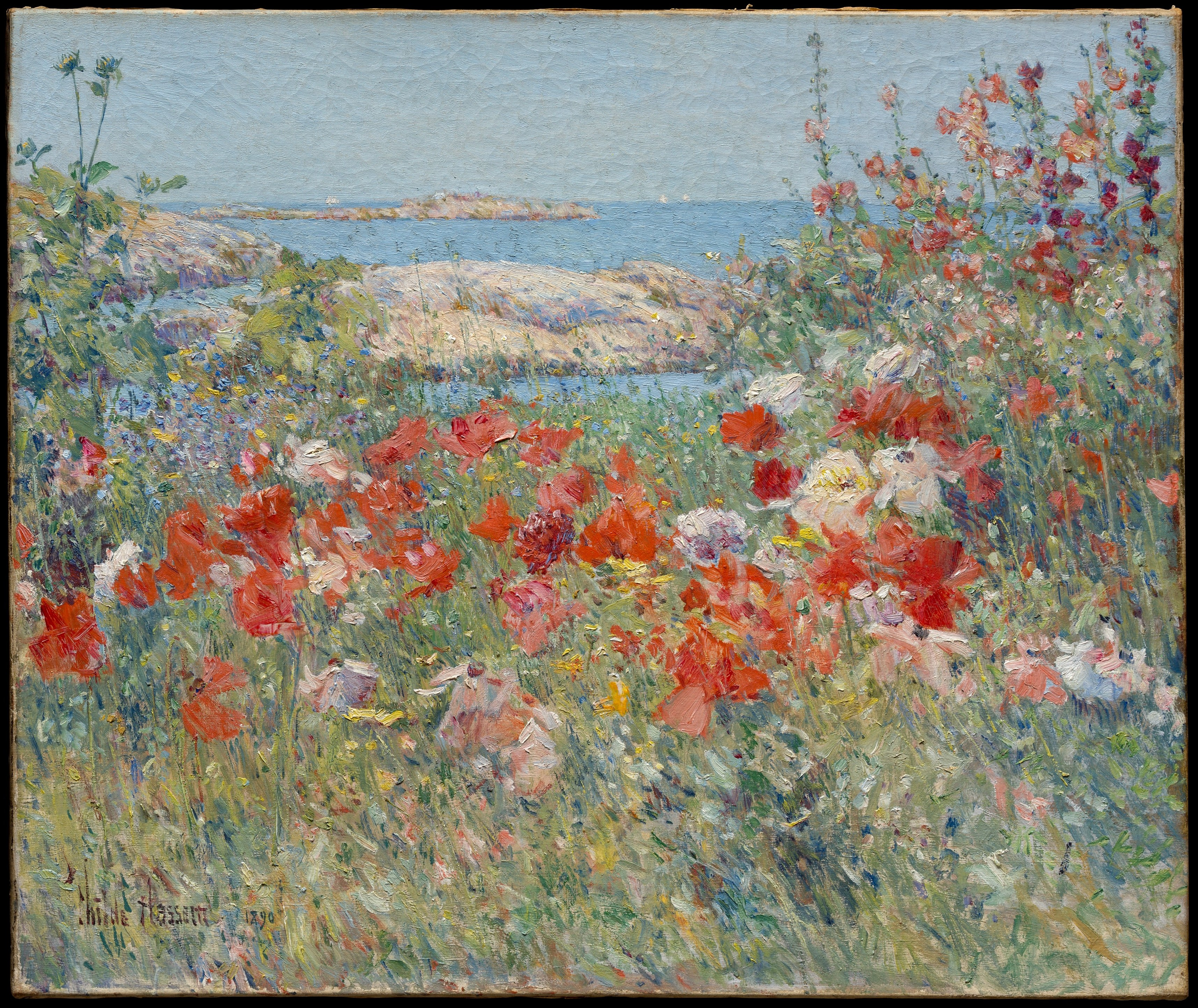
Childe Hassam, Celia Thaxter's Garden, 1890, The Metropolitan Museum of Art, New York City

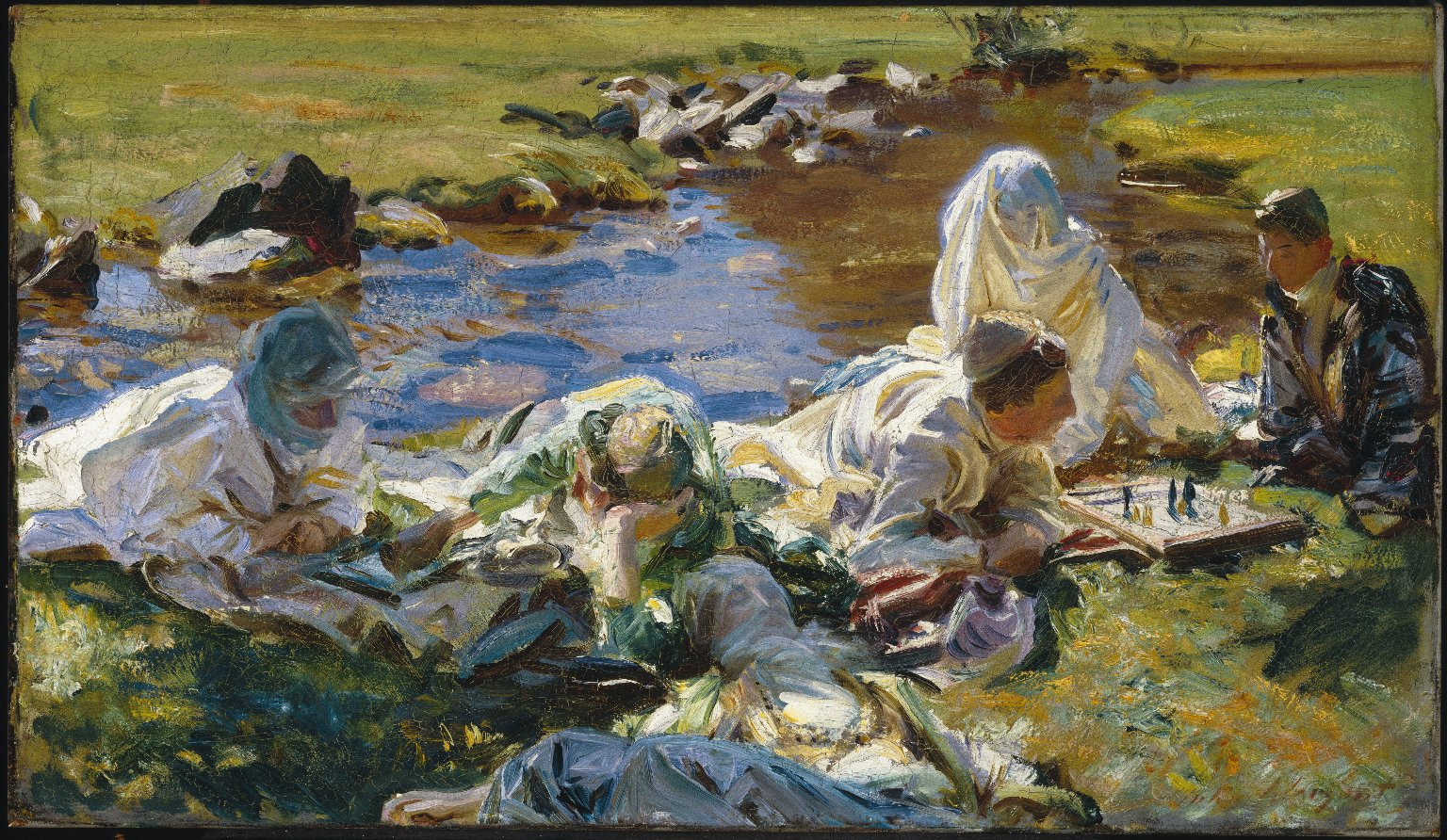
John Singer Sargent, Dolce Far Niente, 1907, Brooklyn Museum

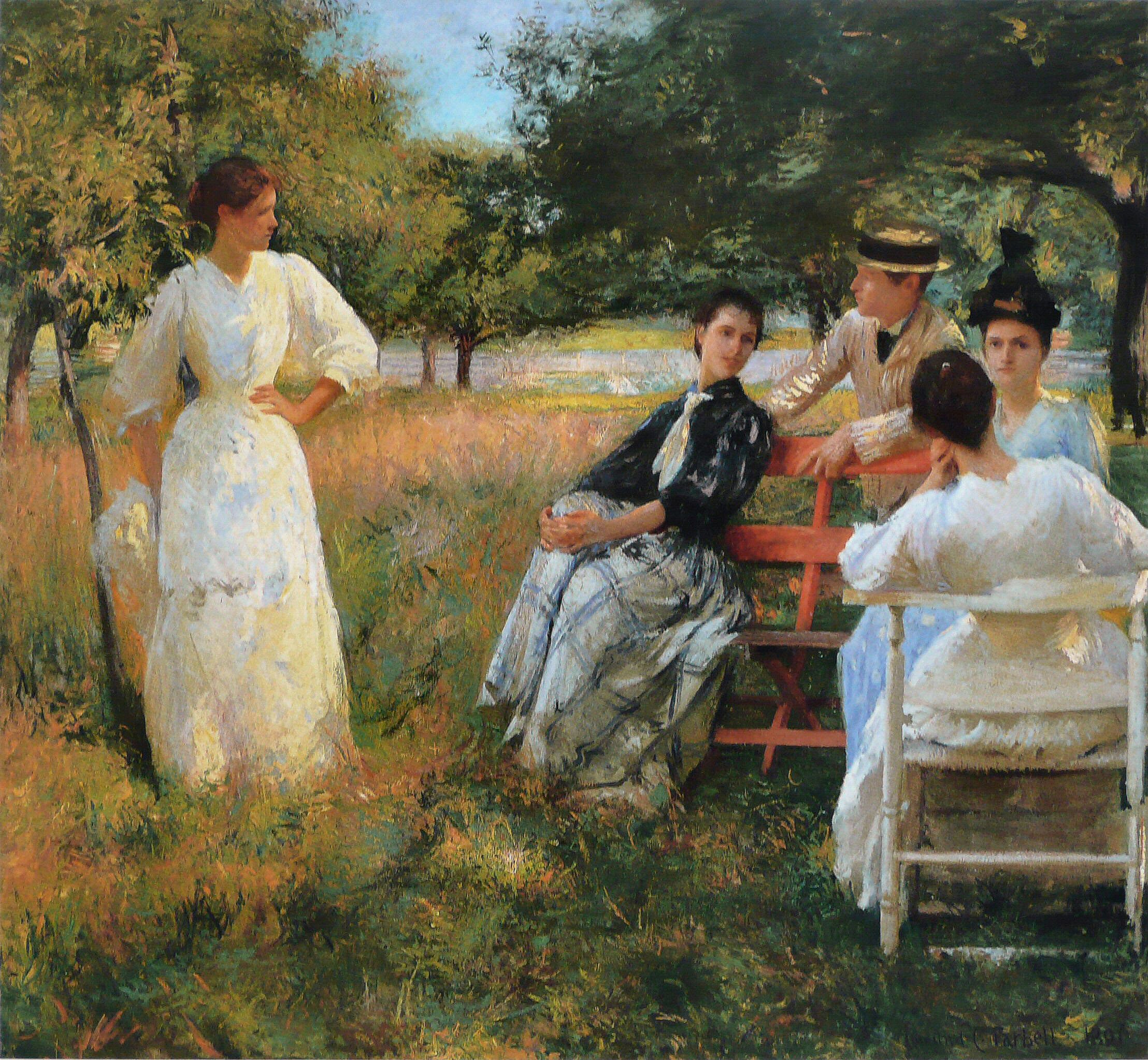
Edmund C. Tarbell, In the Orchard, 1891, Smithsonian American Art Museum, Washington, D.C.

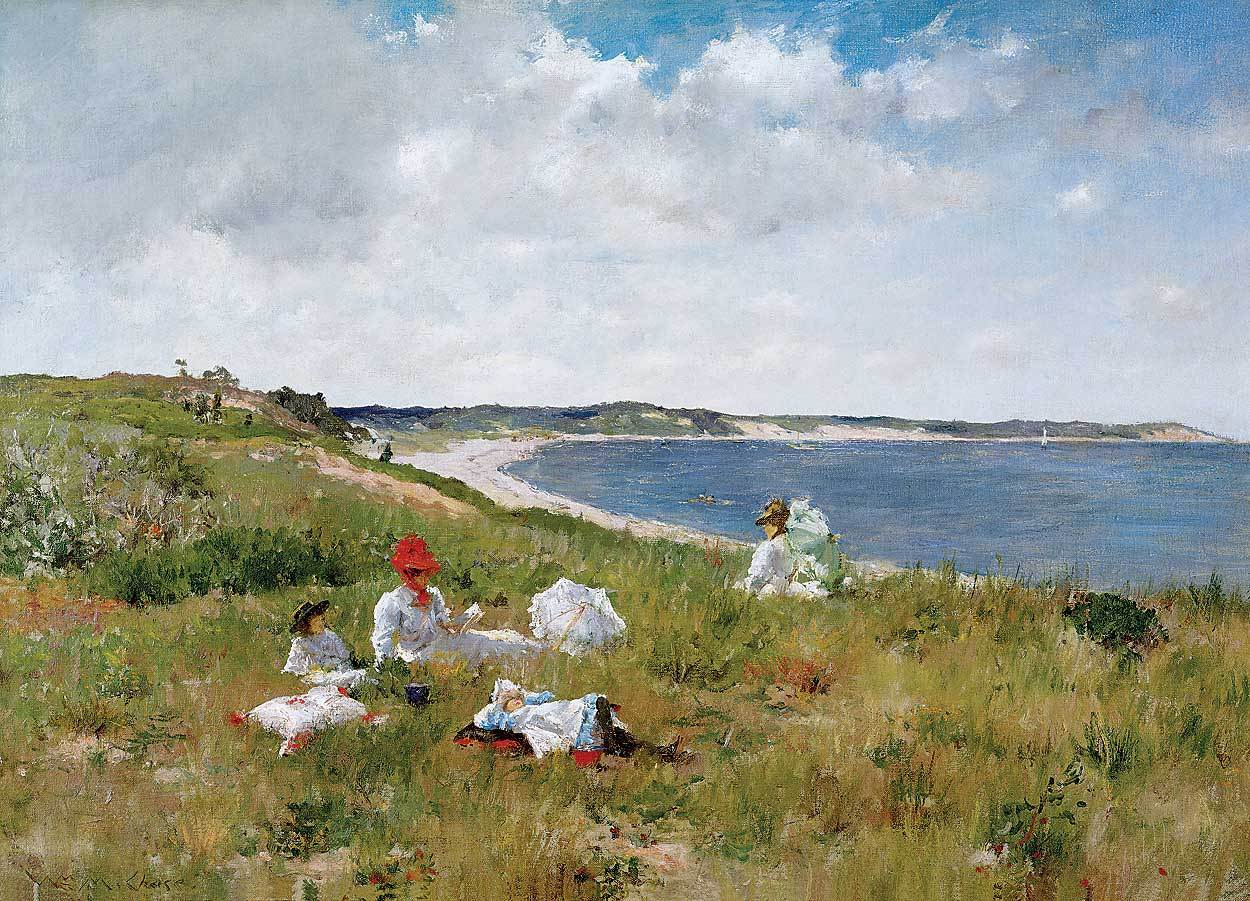
William Merritt Chase, Idle Hours, 1894, Amon Carter Museum, Fort Worth, Texas

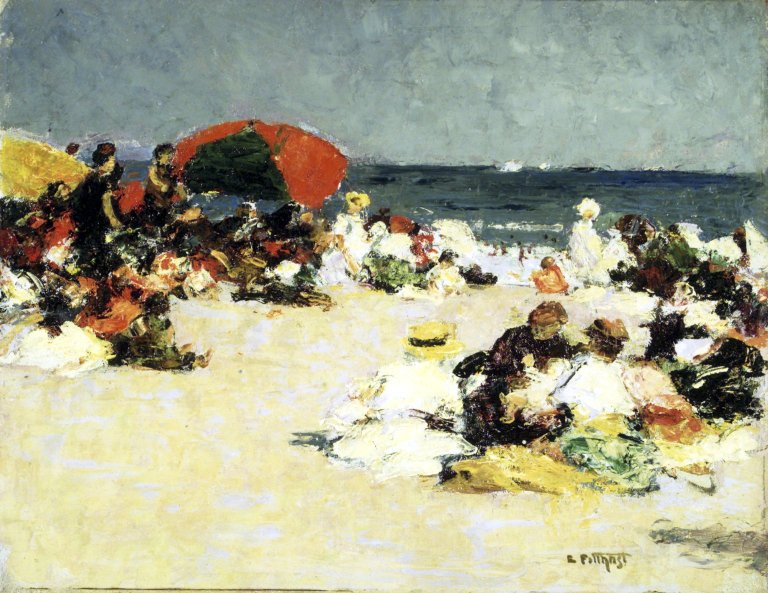
Edward Henry Potthast, On the Beach, c. 1913, Brooklyn Museum

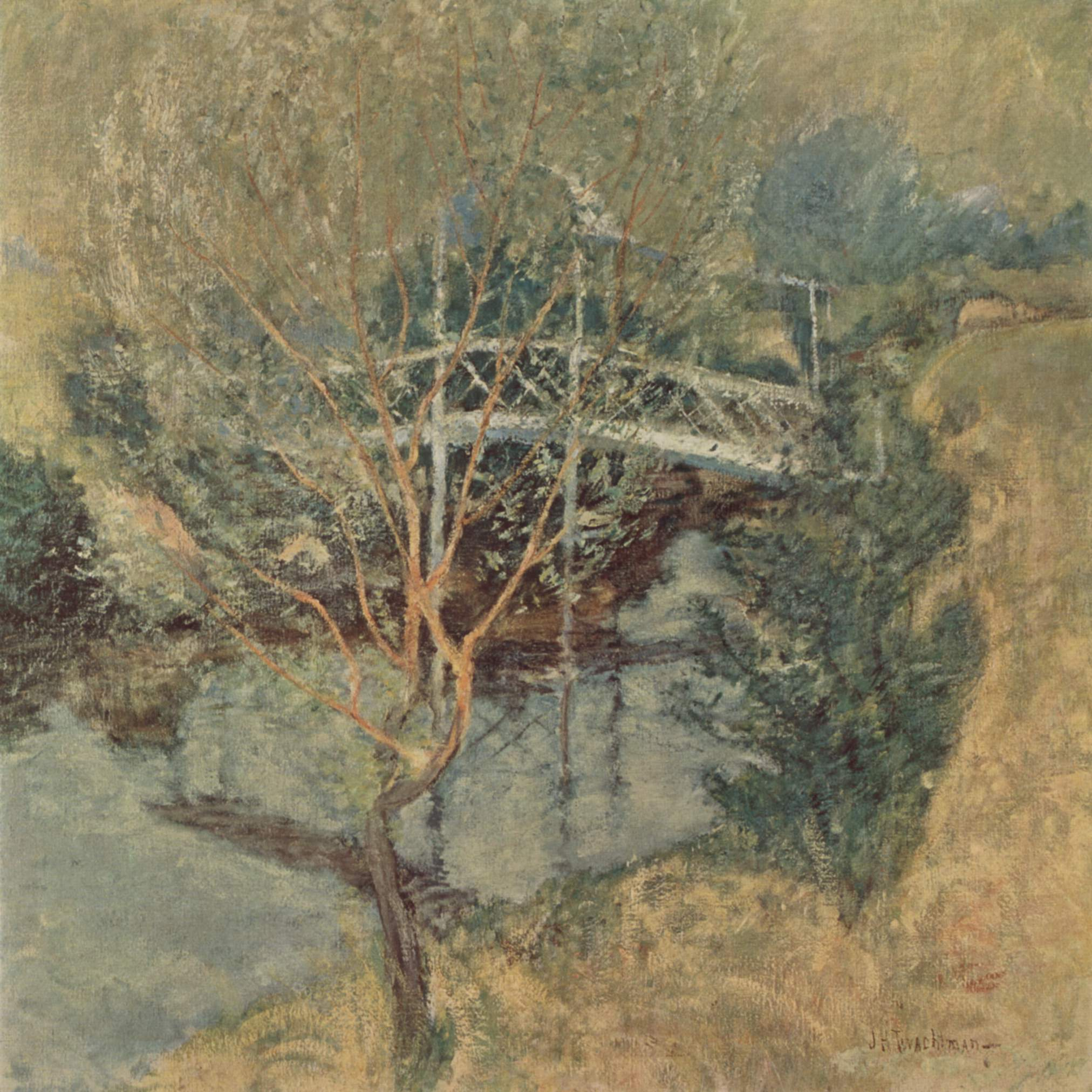
John Henry Twachtman, The White Bridge, c. 1895, Minneapolis Institute of Arts

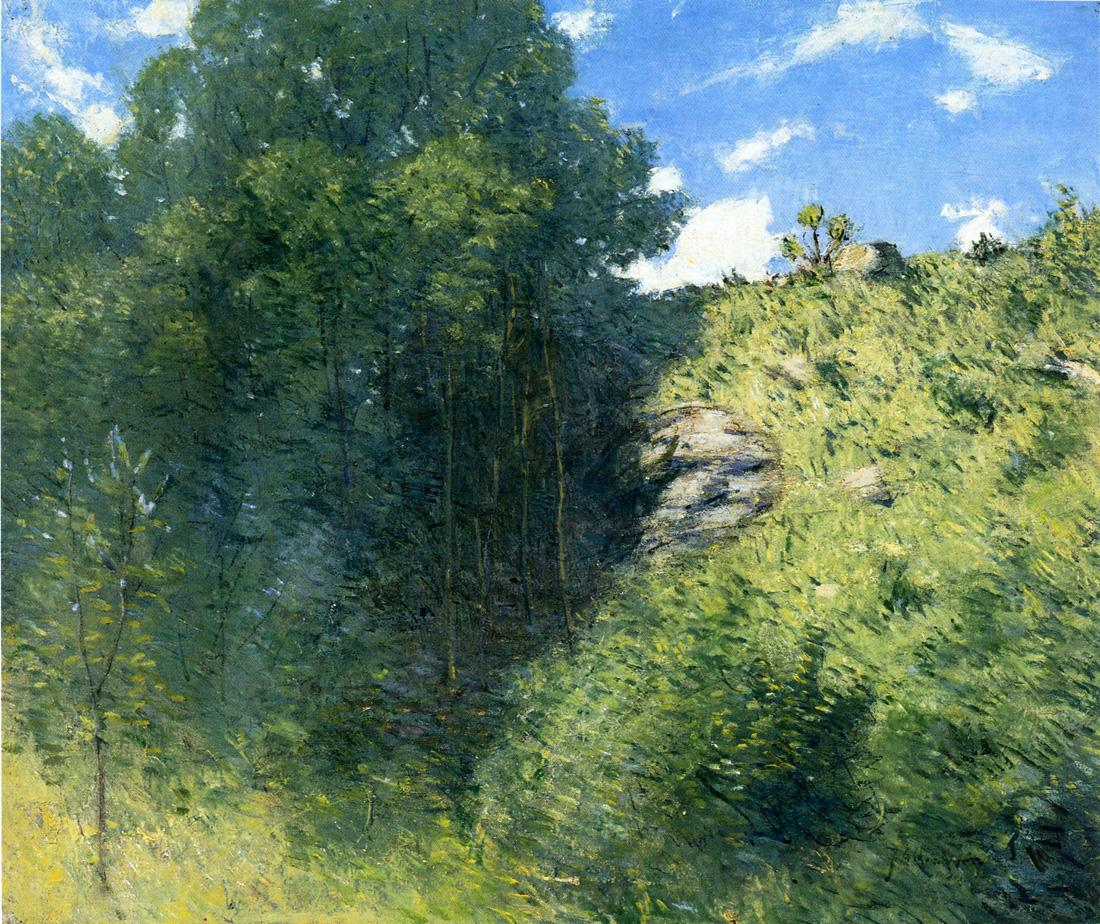
J. Alden Weir, Ravine near Branchville, c. 1905–1915, Dallas Museum of Art

== See also ==
- Boston School
- California Impressionism
- Hoosier Group
- Pennsylvania Impressionism
- Richmond Group
- Ten American Painters
