= Hank Monk =

American stagecoach driver (1826–1883)

Hank Monk

Hank Monk (March 24, 1826 – February 28, 1883) was a stagecoach driver in the 19th century who drove a stage between Carson City, Nevada, and Placerville, California, in the 1870s. He is mentioned in Chapter XX of Mark Twain's Roughing It.

== Early life ==
Henry James Monk, later called "Hank," was born in Waddington, St Lawrence County, New York, on March 24, 1826. He always had a great fancy for horses, and once drove eight horses abreast in Boston during a civic celebration.

Monk is believed to have started driving a stage at age 12 for William Clark in northern New York state between Ogdensburg and Fort Covington.

He went to California in 1852 and began to drive stage between Sacramento and Auburn for the California Stage Company, whose president was the young James E. Birch from Providence, Rhode Island. Later Monk drove between Sacramento and Placerville.

In 1857 and thereafter, he drove stages for J.B. Crandall between Placerville and Genoa, Nevada. He continued to run when the line was bought in turn, by Brady and Sundland, and Wells Fargo and Company. He drove Nevada stages for more than twenty years, notably between Carson City and Virginia City for "Billy" Wilson, and between Carson City and Glenbrook for "Doc" Benton.

Idah Meacham Strobridge gives an account of riding Monk's stage in her book The Land of the Purple Shadow. She writes:

Hank Monk, the incomparable! The most daring - the most reckless of drivers; and the luckiest. The oddest, the drollest of all the whimsical characters who made Western staging famous the world over. ... It was a dream come true! I'm quite sure that had anyone asked me which of the two I would rather see – hear – speak to, Hank Monk, or the President (and that I mean Abraham Lincoln), it would have been the former I unhestitately [sic] would have chosen. Without a doubt my youthful judgment was bias, but the fact remains.

== Death ==
Monk died of pneumonia in Carson City on February 28, 1883.

== Excerpt ==
Excerpt from Roughing It:

This reminds me of a circumstance. Just after we left Julesburg, on the Platte, I was sitting with the driver, and he said:

A day or two after that we picked up a Denver man at the cross roads, and he told us a good deal about the country and the Gregory Diggings. He seemed a very entertaining person and a man well posted in the affairs of Colorado. By and by he remarked:

I can tell you a most laughable thing indeed, if you would like to listen to it. Horace Greeley went over this road once. When he was leaving Carson City he told the driver, Hank Monk, that he had an engagement to lecture at Placerville and was very anxious to go through quick. Hank Monk cracked his whip and started off at an awful pace. The coach bounced up and down in such a terrific way that it jolted the buttons all off of Horace's coat, and finally shot his head clean through the roof of the stage, and then he yelled at Hank Monk and begged him to go easier--said he warn't in as much of a hurry as he was awhile ago.

But Hank Monk said, 'Keep your seat, Horace, and I'll get you there on time!'--and you bet you he did, too, what was left of him!
