= Artists of the Arroyo Seco (Los Angeles) =

Listing of California artists

The Arroyo Seco region has been home and inspiration to artists from Los Angeles' boom years of the 1880s to present day. This region of Northeast Los Angeles that borders the Arroyo Seco and the Los Angeles River encompasses Pasadena, Altadena, Highland Park, Garvanza, Mount Washington, and El Sereno. Historian Kevin Starr defines Arroyo Culture as "a collective designation now given to a loosely defined, scattered movement, many of whose protagonists lived, like Charles Fletcher Lummis at El Alisal, along the Arroyo Seco.

Book designer, printer and writer Ward Ritchie described the early development of the arts and culture along Arroyo Seco as a "Southland Bohemia."

Along with writers and book artists, early painters such Elmer Wachtel and William Lees Judson lived along the Arroyo forming "an informal but discernable Arroyo School," states Starr.

The California Art Club was founded in 1909 when a group of local artists gathered along the banks of the Arroyo Seco at the home and studio of painter Franz Bischoff to create a professional organization of painters and sculptors.

== Notable artists ==
Early Arroyoans artists and cultural figures:

- Clyde Browne - printer, book designer
- Margaret Collier Graham - writer
- Alson S. Clark - painter
- Alice Millard - bookseller, collector, cultural promoter
- Elmer Wachtel - painter
- Jean Mannheim - painter
- William Lees Judson - painter, stained glass maker
- Idah Meacham Strobridge - writer, bookbinder, publisher
- Charles Fletcher Lummis - writer, editor, librarian
- George Wharton James - writer, editor
- Franz Bischoff - painter
- Ernest A. Batchelder - artist and educator
- Marion Wachtel - painter
- Fritz Poock - painter

== Bibliography ==
- Cloonan, Michele (2006). "Alice Millard and the Gospel of Beauty and Taste", in Women in Print : Essays on the Print Culture of American Women from the Nineteenth and Twentieth Centuries, eds. Danky and Weigand. University of Wisconsin Press.
- Schenider, Nina (2014). "Under the Sign of the Sagebrush: Idah Meacham Strobridge and the Southland’s Bohemia." California State Library Foundation Bulletin, Vol. 109, pp. 2-11
- Apostal, Jane. "Margaret Collier Graham: First Lady of the Foothills." Southern California Quarterly, Vol. 63, No. 4 (WINTER 1981), pp. 348-373
- Apostol, Jane (2012). Collected Works. Pasadena, CA: TMA Graphics
- Robert Winter, “The Arroyo Culture,” in California Design, 1910 (edited by Timothy J. Anderson, Eudorah M. Moore, and Robert W. Winter, 1980)
