= Edward Henry Potthast =

American painter

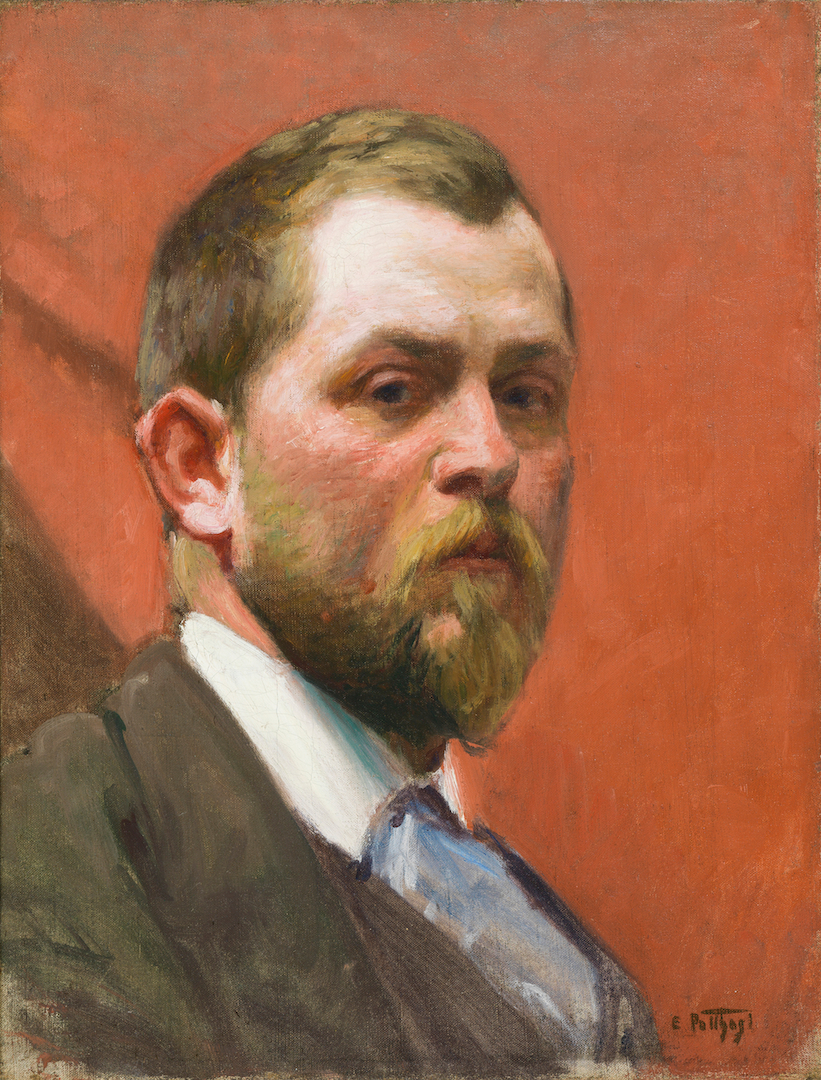
- Edward Henry Potthast, Self-Portrait, ca. 1920–27
- Born: Edward Henry Potthast; June 10, 1857; Cincinnati, Ohio
- Died: March 9, 1927 (aged 69); New York City
- Education: Académie Julian
- Known for: Painting
- Movement: American Impressionism
- Awards: Medal, Royal Munich Academy, 1885; Inness Prize, 1903, 1906; Silver Medal, University of Saint Louis Exhibition, 1904; Hudnut Prize, 1914

Edward Henry Potthast (June 10, 1857 – March 9, 1927) was an American Impressionist painter. He is known for his paintings of people at leisure in Central Park, and on the beaches of New York and New England.

== Life and work ==
Edward Henry Potthast was born on June 10, 1857, in Cincinnati, Ohio, to Henry Ignatz Potthast and Bernadine Scheiffers. Starting in 1870 he studied art at the McMicken School in Cincinnati and in 1873 he started working at the Strobridge Lithography Company. From June 10, 1879, to March 9, 1881, Potthast studied under Thomas Satterwhite Noble, a retired Confederate army captain who had studied with Thomas Couture in Paris. Potthast later studied at the Royal Academy in Munich with the American-born instructor Carl Marr. After returning to Cincinnati in 1885 he resumed his studies with Noble. In 1886, he departed for Paris, where he studied with Fernand Cormon. In 1895 he relocated to New York City and remained there until his death in 1927.

Until the age of thirty-nine Potthast earned a living as a lithographer. The purchase of one of his paintings by the Cincinnati Museum of Art may have encouraged him to abandon lithography for a career as a fine artist. His paintings retained the subdued colors and strong contrasts of the Munich school until he adopted the Impressionist palette late in his career.

After his arrival in New York Potthast worked as a magazine illustrator, and exhibited regularly at the National Academy of Design, the Society of American Artists and the Salmagundi Club, winning numerous prizes. By 1908 he was installed in a studio in the Gainsborough Building. Thereafter he painted sun-saturated images of Central Park, New England landscapes, and the Long Island beach scenes for which he is best remembered.

His work is included in many major museums in the United States, including the Orlando Museum of Art, the Brooklyn Museum, the Cape Ann Museum, the Delaware Art Museum, the University of Michigan Museum of Art, the Phoenix Art Museum, the Nasher Museum of Art, and the Virginia Museum of Fine Arts.

== Gallery ==
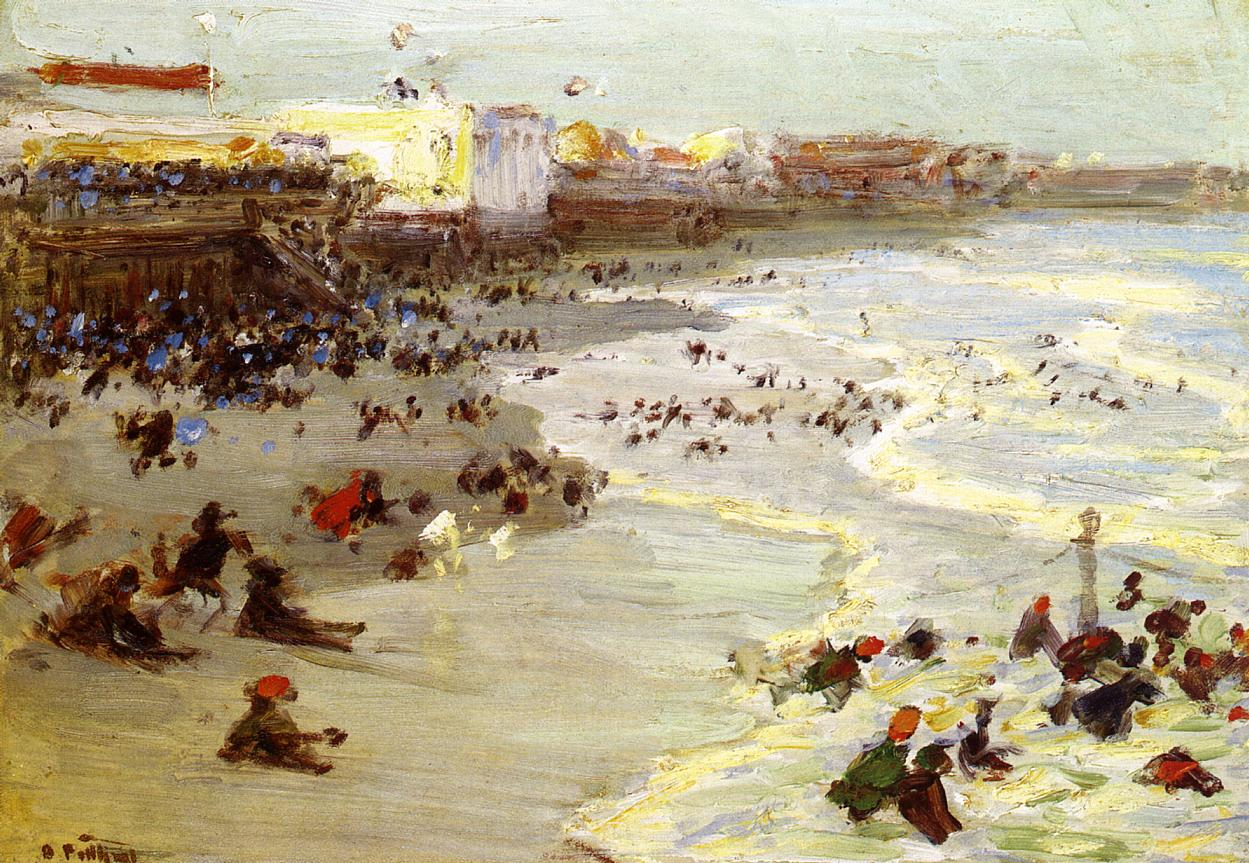
Edward Henry Potthast Coney Island, c. 1914

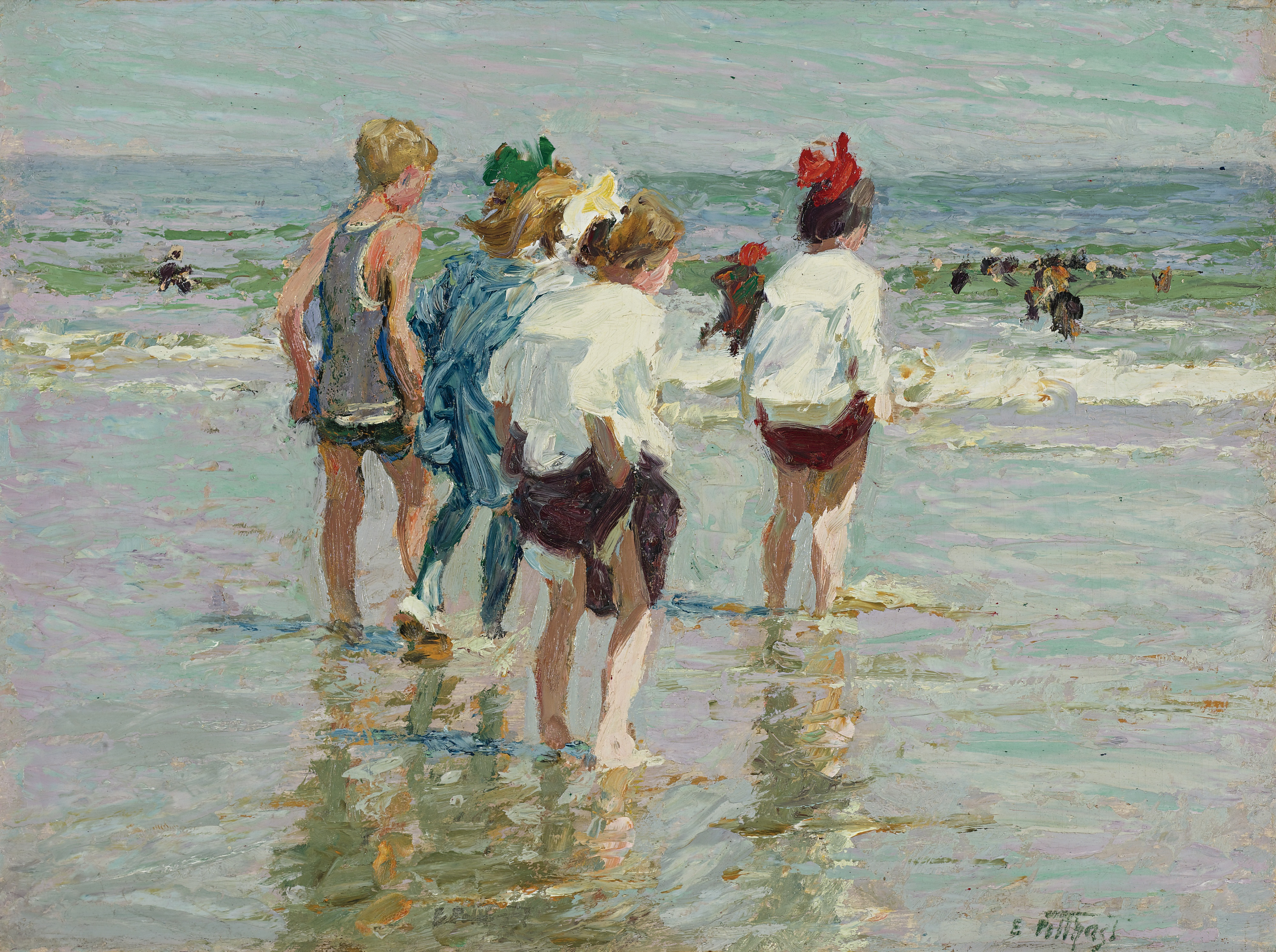
Edward Henry Potthast Summer day, Brighton Beach

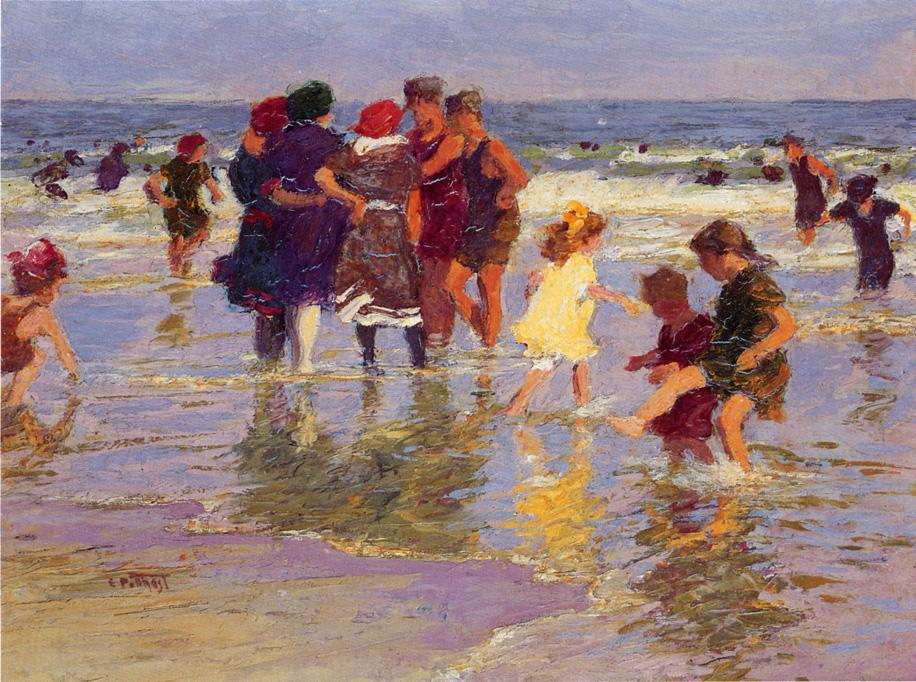
Edward Henry Potthast A July Day, oil, 1914

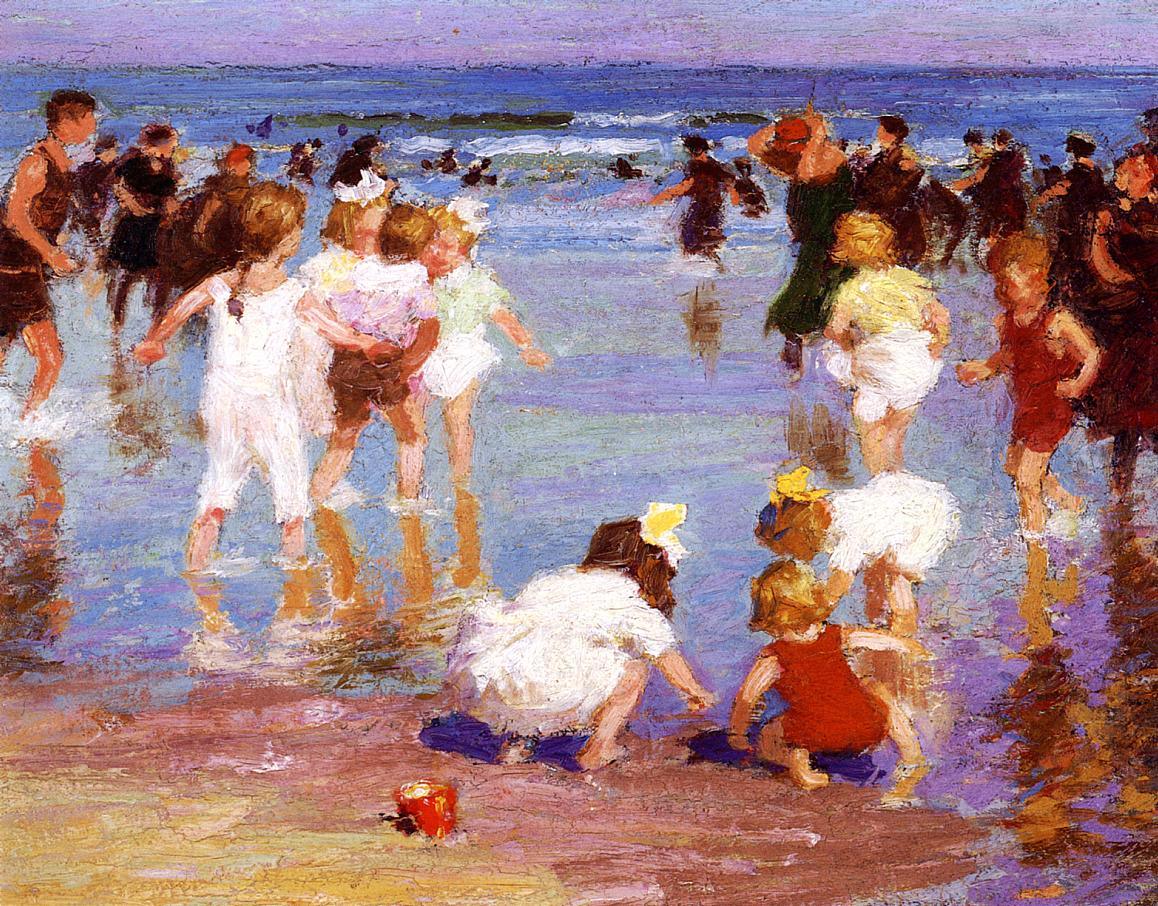
Edward Henry Potthast Happy Days, oil on panel, c. 1910–1920
