= Annie Harmon =

American painter

- Born: Annie Lyle Harmon; February 1855; San Francisco, California, U.S.
- Died: August 27, 1930 (aged 75); San Francisco, California, U.S.
- Years active: 1885-1925

Annie Lyle Harmon (February 1855 – August 27, 1930) was a Californian plein-air artist known especially for her paintings of trees. A student of leading landscape artist William Keith (1838–1911), Harmon, along with several other artists, was a fixture in Keith's studio for many years.

== Early life ==
Annie Harmon was the daughter of Samuel H. Harmon, a lumber merchant who had come to San Francisco from Maine via Cape Horn in 1849, and his wife Mary Palmer Harmon. She grew up in prosperous circumstances that allowed her access to the city's small cultural society. Her brother Edward married William Keith's only daughter.

== Education ==
Along with William Keith, Harmon studied with Raymond Dabb Yelland (1848–1900), an English-born landscape artist who taught students in Oakland.

== Career ==
She began working in William Keith's studio in the early 1880s; the works she exhibited in her first show in 1885 centered on images of the California hills in emulation of her teacher's style. Throughout her life, she sketched from nature, but finished her paintings back in the studio. She was known to paint miniatures on cigar box lids, as well as using traditional canvas.

She exhibited frequently from the 1880s until her death, especially with the San Francisco Art Association. In the city directories, she always identified herself as “artist.” Harmon exhibited her work in the California State Building at the 1893 World's Columbian Exposition in Chicago, Illinois.

In the early 1900s, she traveled to La Zacualpa, Mexico, where her family was involved in a rubber plantation; some of her most successful landscapes were made there. A few paintings in the collection of her most ardent collector indicate that at some time she traveled to Australia, although this trip cannot be substantiated. She also traveled and sketched in "Maine, Mexico, and Washington State."

She lost nearly 400 of her works when her studio in the San Francisco Press Building was destroyed in the 1906 earthquake and fire. While she remained an independent artist throughout her life and continued to exhibit after the fire, she never recovered financially, and was increasingly dependent on friends for support in her later years.

The primary subject of her works was always Californian trees, either redwoods or, most successfully, the oak trees of the Berkeley and San Francisco hills. She developed two contrasting painterly styles, depending on her portrayal of light: either a thick impasto, used for her portrayal of redwoods and eucalyptus; or more atmospheric effects to depict the foggy California hillsides and the coastal ranges. The majority of her known works are in two private collections, although some of her paintings are now in the collection of The Hearst Art Gallery, Saint Mary's College, Moraga, California—home of a substantial number of the paintings of William Keith.

== Posthumous exhibitions ==
In 2010 an exhibition of Harmon's work and that of two other turn-of-the-century artists, Marion Kavanagh Wachtel and Mary DeNeale Morgan was held at the Saint Mary's College Museum of Art. There were nearly 100 landscape paintings of California in the show made by the en plein air artists.

== Gallery ==
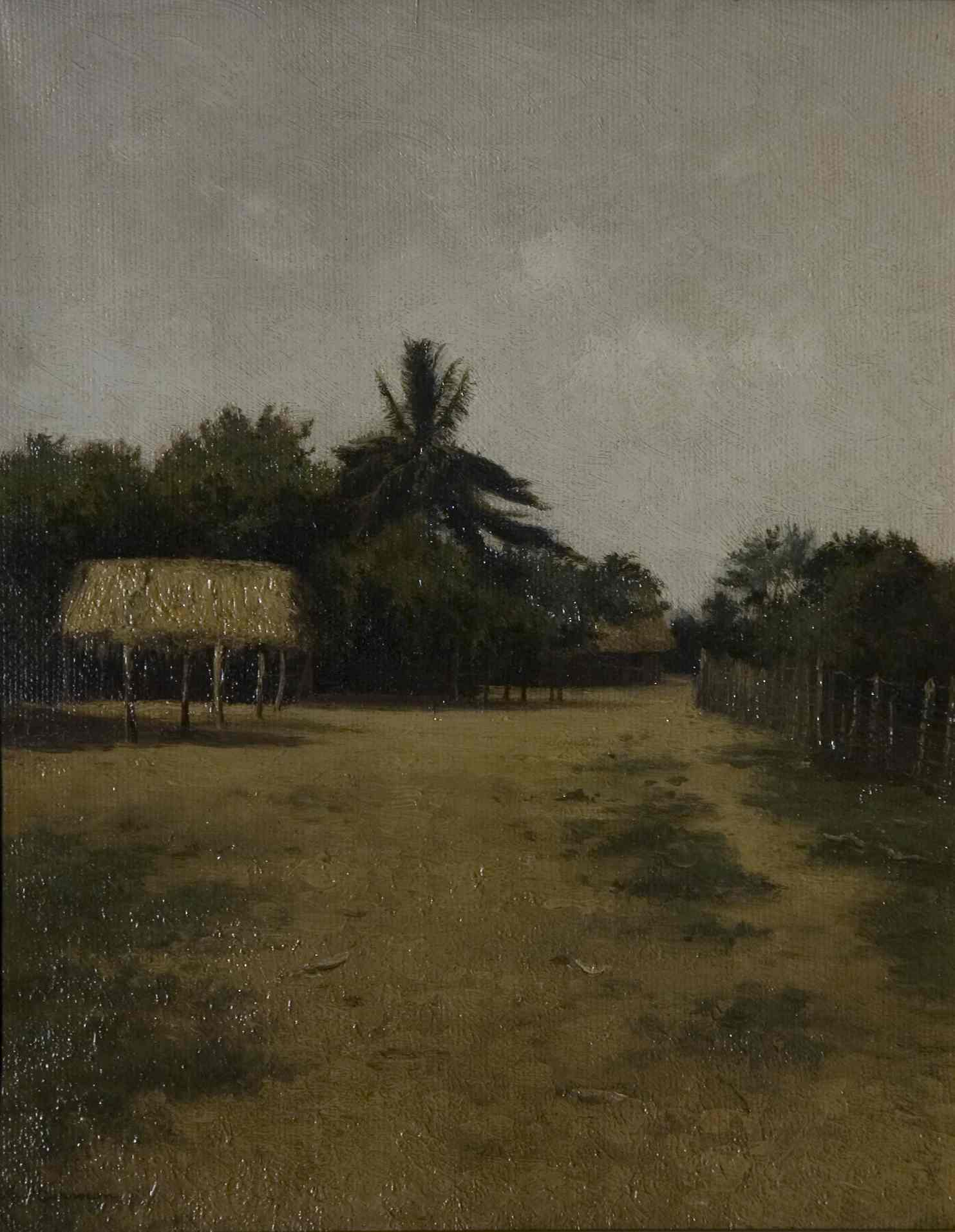
Grass Hut at La Zacualpa

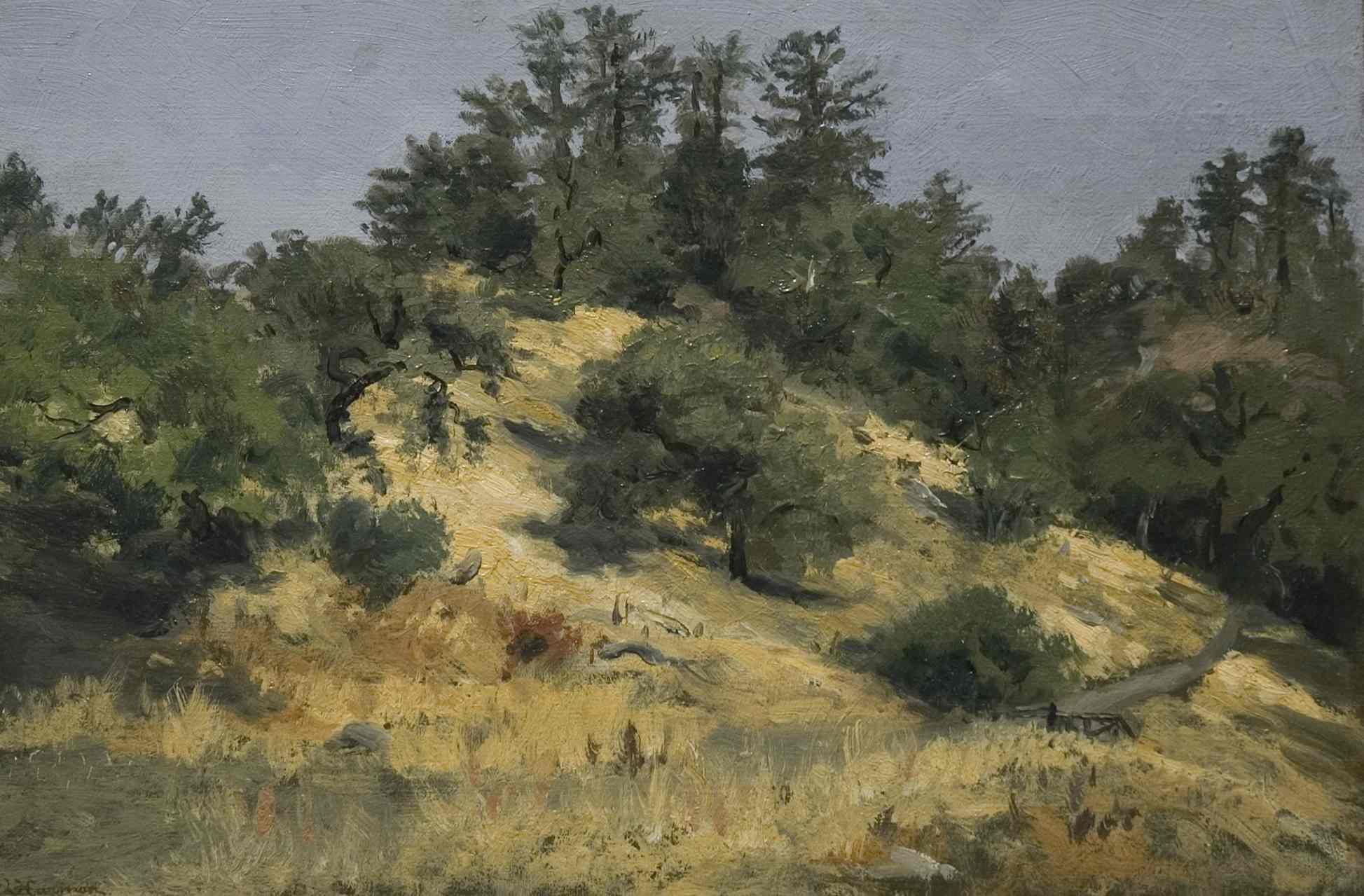
Mendocino Ranch Rock Pile

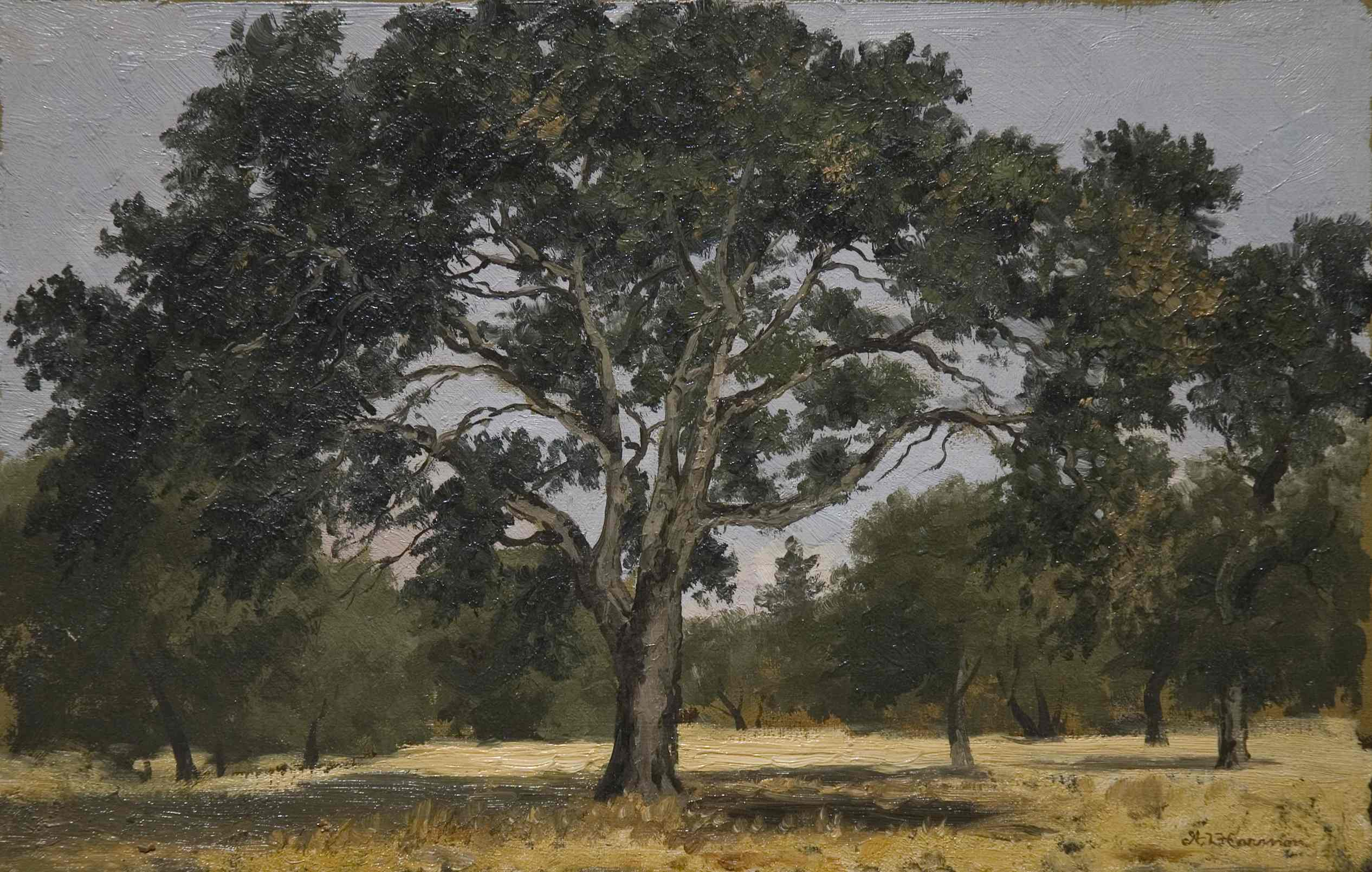
Menlo Park
