= Charles S. Kaelin =

American painter

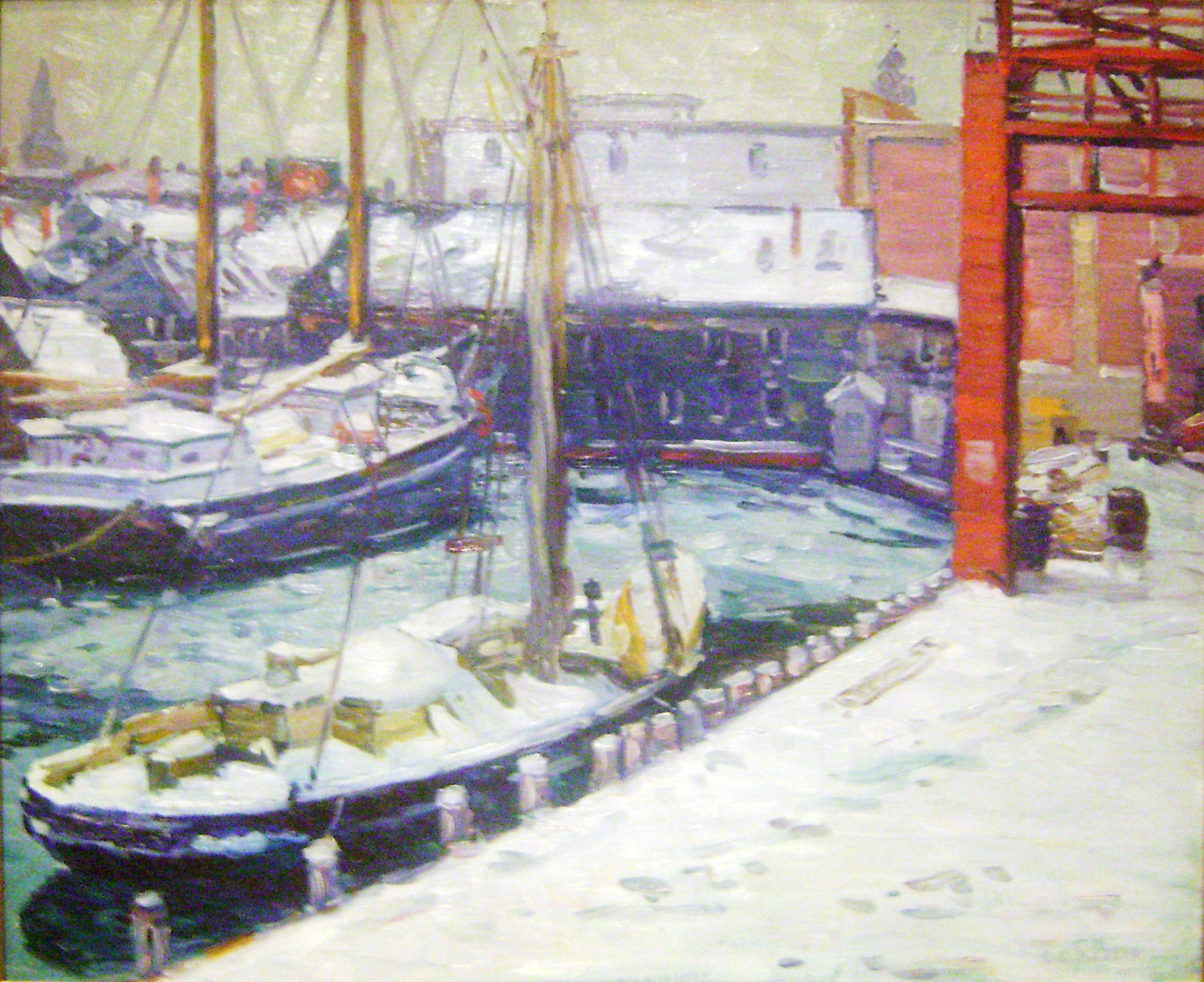
Wharf Scene in Winter (ca. 1910), oil on canvas. In the collection of the City School District of Cincinnati, made available for display to the Cincinnati Museum Center and the Cincinnati Art Museum.

Charles Salis Kaelin (19 December 1858, in Cincinnati – 28 March 1929, in Rockport, Massachusetts) was an American impressionist painter.

== Biography ==
He studied under John Henry Twachtman between 1876 and 1879, after which time he moved to New York City and joined the Art Students League of New York. In 1893 he returned to Cincinnati and worked as a designer for several lithography companies. In 1913 he exhibited at the Cincinnati Art Museum in Eden Park. He moved to Rockport, Massachusetts in 1916, where he painted landscapes and ships. His work is in the collection of the Cincinnati Art Museum, where he exhibited regularly throughout his career. Kaelin is regarded as an artist of significance in the field of American Impressionism.
