= Elmer Wachtel =

American painter

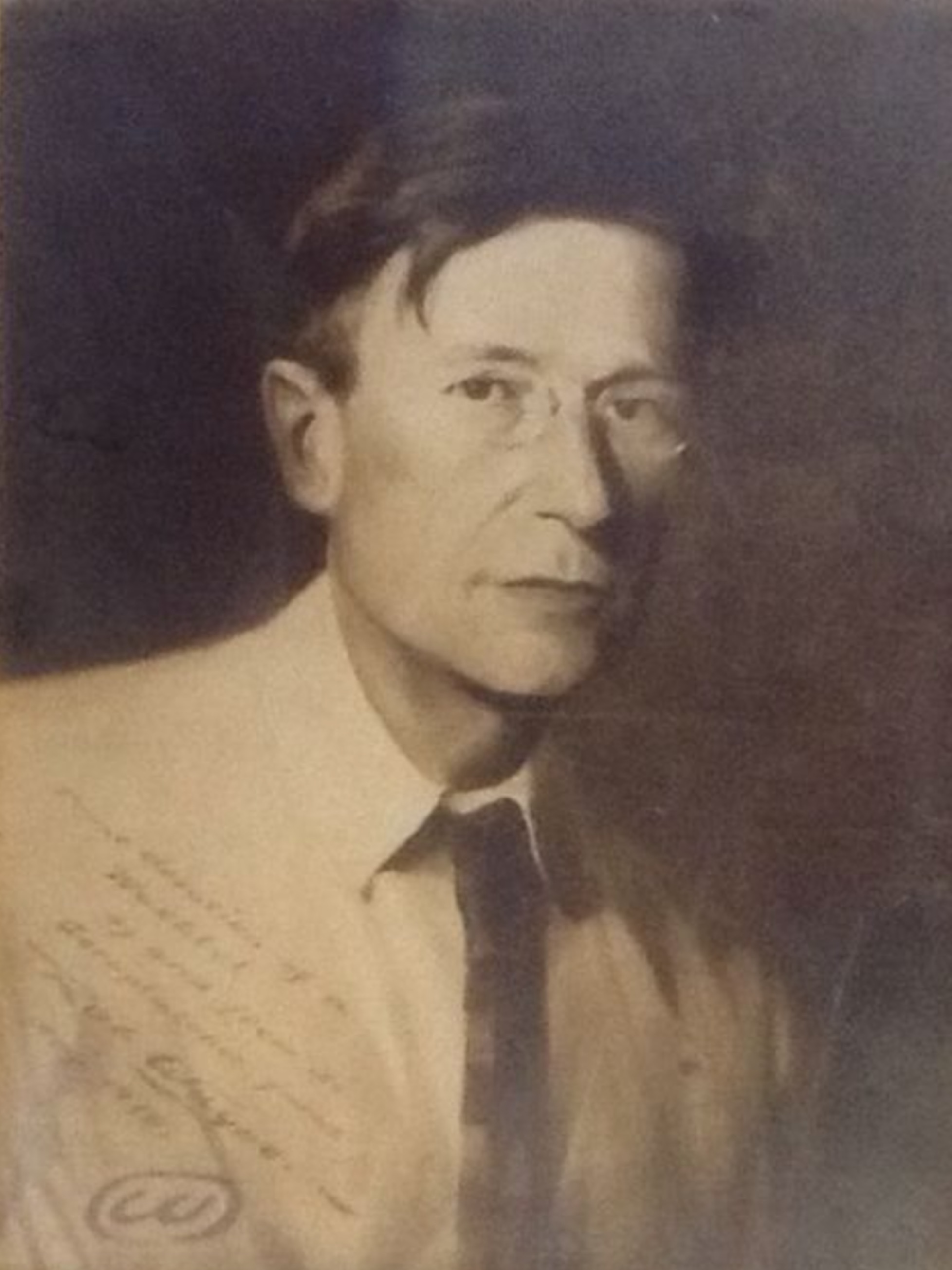
- Portrait of artist Elmer Wachtel by fellow artist Rob Wagner, Los Angeles, 1909.
- Born: January 21, 1864; Baltimore, Maryland, United States
- Died: August 31, 1929 (aged 65); Guadalajara, Mexico
- Spouse: Marion Wachtel

Elmer Wachtel (1864-1929) was an American painter who lived and worked in Southern California. He was known for his impressionist landscapes.

== Biography ==
Wachtel was born in Baltimore, Maryland on January 21, 1864. He moved to California in 1882 to live with his brother, who was working in San Gabriel. Wachtel worked as a ranch hand and as a furniture store clerk while saving money to attend art school. He also worked as a violinist, playing for the Philharmonic Orchestra of Los Angeles. Wachtel was largely self-taught as a painter. He studied at the Art Students' League in New York for two months and then later at the Lambeth School of Art in London. Wachtel married sculptor Marion Kavanagh in 1904; the two lived in the Arroyo Seco region of Los Angeles. Wachtel was known for painting California's landscapes, rather than European landscapes. On August 31, 1929, Wachtel died suddenly while on a painting trip in Guadalajara, Mexico.

During World War I, Wachtel became an informant for the U.S. Department of Justice by reporting to federal law authorities alleged pro-German and antiwar statements by militant socialists and fellow artists.

== See also ==
- Artists of the Arroyo Seco (Los Angeles)
