= Marion Wachtel =

American painter

Marion Kavanaugh Wachtel
- Born: Marion Kavanaugh; June 10, 1873; Milwaukee, Wisconsin, U.S.
- Died: May 22, 1954 (aged 80); Pasadena, California, U.S.
- Known for: Painting
- Movement: American Impressionism
- Spouse: Elmer Wachtel (m. 1904)

Marion Kavanaugh Wachtel (June 10, 1873/77 – May 22, 1954) (Note: Her year of birth is uncertain, there are many years of birth given for Wachtel ranging from 1873 to 1877.) was an American plein air painter in watercolors and oils. She lived and worked with her artist husband Elmer Wachtel in the Arroyo Seco near Pasadena, California, in the early 20th century.

== Early life ==
Marion Kavanagh was born in Milwaukee, Wisconsin to James Kavanagh and Jean Jo Auston Kavanagh. Her English mother and Irish grandfather were also painters.

== Career ==
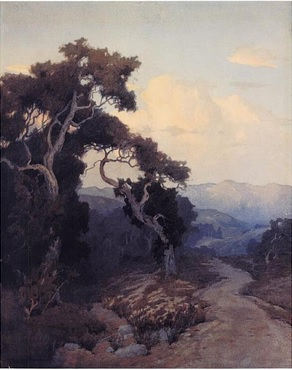
Sunset Clouds, 1904

She trained at the Art Institute of Chicago, and under William Merritt Chase in New York. She was a member of the New York Watercolor Club. Later, she taught in public schools and at the Art Institute of Chicago. In 1903 she journeyed to California, where she studied under William Keith, and Elmer Wachtel, whom she married in 1904.

She painted primarily figures and portraits in the east and then changed to landscapes of the dramatic Californian and Southwestern terrain. Her medium of choice was watercolor, but she began painting in oils after her husband’s death.

Wachtel was an involved in a number of arts organizations in the Southern California area, including the California Watercolor Society, Pasadena Society of Artists, the Academy of Western Painters, and the California Art Club.She was also a member of the New York Watercolor Club, in New York City.

== Posthumous exhibitions ==
In 2010 an exhibition of Wachtel's work and that of two other turn-of-the-century artists, Annie Harmon and Mary DeNeale Morgan was held at the Saint Mary's College Museum of Art. There were nearly 100 landscape paintings of California in the show made by the en plein air artists.

== Collections ==
Among the collections that hold her works are:

- California State Building, Sacramento, California
- Cedar Rapids Museum, Iowa
- Friday Morning Club, Los Angeles, California
- Women's Club, Hollywood, California

== Works ==
Some of the works by Wachtel are:

- California Mountains, oil
- Coast Mountains of California, before 1907, oil
- Cypress Point, ca. 1900-1910, oil
- Elmer Wachtel, ca. 1912, watercolor
- High Sierras, oil, Laguna Art Museum, California
- Hillside Path in Early Piedmont, ca. 1900, watercolor
- Indian Girl, oil
- Landscape, ca. 1918, watercolor, Laguna Art Museum, California
- Near Santa Barbara, before 1907, oil
- Oaks, ca. 1900-1910, watercolor
- Sycamores, watercolor, Laguna Art Museum, California
- Teton Park, oil
