= Fritz Poock =

German-American painter

Carl Rudolph Poock
- Born: February 20, 1877; Halberstadt, Germany
- Died: January 2, 1945 (aged 67)
- Known for: watercolor
- Movement: California Plein-Air Painting

Carl Rudolph "Fritz" Poock (February 20, 1877 – January 2, 1945) was an American artist born in Germany. He was a noted practitioner of the Plein-Air Painting style, an important movement in pre-World War II Southern California, and a part of the influential Arroyo Seco art scene.

== Early life ==
Fritz Poock was born in Halberstadt, Germany in 1877. He studied with Francisco del Marmol of Spain.

== Move to Los Angeles ==
In 1905, Poock moved to Los Angeles, eventually settling in the Highland Park neighborhood. He worked in construction — including a stint at Manzanillo, Mexico, where he also painted — and as a mechanical drafter until retiring at age 50 to devote himself full-time to painting.

== Career ==
Fritz Poock worked primarily in watercolor and was a member of the influential California Art Club, painted a mural at Santa Monica High School and had shows at the venerable Stendahl Galleries and the Friday Morning Club. Upon his death in 1945, his wife Doris Poock donated paintings to the City of Los Angeles and to the Southwest Museum of the American Indian.
