= Van Dearing Perrine =

American painter

Van Dearing Perrine (1869 – 1955) was an American Impressionist painter. Perrine moved to New York around 1893, and studied at the National Academy of Design (1894–1897). He founded The Country Sketch Club, which held a number of exhibitions at the Academy in the late 1890s, and the Art Institute of Chicago in 1901. Walter Farndon, Charles Hawthorne, Jonas Lie, and Maurice Stern also exhibited in these shows. Perrine's first solo exhibition was at the Glaenzer Galleries in New York in 1903. He exhibited shortly thereafter at the Forest Park Art Building in the American section of the World's Fair in 1904. He also exhibited at the Durand-Ruel Gallery, the New Gallery, the Armory Show of 1913, and The Grand Central Art Galleries in New York City.

Perrine was a guest of Eleanor Roosevelt at the White House in June 1934, and Franklin D. Roosevelt purchased one of Van Perrine’s paintings of the Palisades to have it hung in the White House shortly thereafter. He has also been collected by the Smithsonian Museum.

Charles Montgomery Skinner, art-critic for the Brooklyn Eagle newspaper described him as "not a man of externals, but an interpreter of the spirit". Several notable literary and art critics in the early part of the 20th century wrote about Perrine's work. William Vaughn Moody described Perrine as a "painter of elemental phenomenon" and Richard Watson Gilder regarded him as "the most original figure in American landscape art today." Frank W. Gunsaulus, President of the Armour Institute in Chicago, hailed Perrine as "the biggest landscape painter in this country" and declared that he had inaugurated a new school in American art. He was often referred to as the "Painter of the Palisades," or the "Thoreau of the Palisades."

Perrine married Theodora Snow in 1911. They had one son and one daughter. Perrine later became known for his development of a unique program of art instruction for children. His book on that topic, titled "Let the Child Draw" was published in 1936.
