= George Dinckel =

American painter (1890–1976)

George William Dinckel (1890–1976) was an American artist known for impressionist paintings of New England seascapes, landscapes and harbors. Most are oils, tempera, water paints, and gouache. He produced a large body of work during the 1930s through the 1970s.

== Early life and education ==
Dinckel was born in Cincinnati, Ohio, in 1890 (or 1891?), where he attended public schools. He later studied at the Art Academy of Cincinnati under Frank Duveneck. During his time at the Academy, Dinckel met Clara Hohneck (a fellow student ), whom he married in 1918. They lived in Toledo, where he was a member of the Tile Club 2, members of which, in 1901, hatched the idea of organizing an art museum in Toledo – which later became the Toledo Museum of Art. In 1920s, he studied art in Berlin, Munich, Rome and Paris.

== Career ==
Dinckel returned to Toledo, where he worked for the Outdoor Advertising Company, and then became the head of the art department for the Toledo branch of the First National Bank of Detroit. In the late 1920s, he decided to devote full-time to his painting and left the field of design and commercial art. He concentrated on portraits, landscapes, seascapes, and other marine topics. During this time, he maintained a studio on Morin Point on the shore of Lake Erie.

In 1942, he moved permanently to Rockport, Massachusetts. Dinckel gave free painting demonstrations at his studio, the first artist in Rockport to do so. He also taught painting classes.

In the mid-1950s, Dinckel led a traveling "Foreign School of Painting" under the auspices of Intercollegiate Tours, Boston. Dinckel was a member of several Art groups: the Rockport Art Association, Rockport, MA; the North Shore Art Association, Gloucester, MA; the Salmagundi Art Association of New York; the Tile Club in Toledo, OH; the ArtKlan of Toledo, OH; the Scarab Club in Detroit, MI and The Marblehead Art Association, Marblehead, MA.

Dinckel died at home in Rockport, MA, on 28 June 1976, at the age of 86. He is buried in the Beech Grove Cemetery, Rockport, MA.
