= Idah Meacham Strobridge =

American writer and bookbinder (1855–1932)

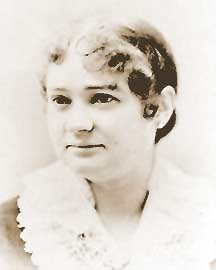
- Born: June 9, 1855; Moraga Valley, California, U.S.
- Died: February 8, 1932 (aged 76)
- Occupation: Book seller

Idah Meacham Strobridge (June 9, 1855 – February 8, 1932) was an American writer and bookbinder. Known primarily for a trio of works about the Great Basin which mix folktales, fiction, sketches, and nature writing: In Miners' Mirage-Land (1904), The Loom of the Desert (1907) and The Land of Purple Shadows (1909).

== Biography ==
Born in Moraga Valley, California, in June 1855. She was the only daughter of Phebe and George Meacham. Idah Meacham moved as a child with her parents to Nevada in the 1860s. The family homesteaded a ranch in Lassen Meadows between Lovelock and Winnemucca (near present-day Rye Patch Reservoir in Pershing County). Her father established the Humboldt House hotel, hoping to capitalize on the newly completed Central Pacific Railroad line nearby. During her years at the Humboldt House, Idah was exposed to people from different backgrounds who later influenced the characters in her writings.

As Anthony Amaral wrote, "What she wrote about she had seen through long tenure of living in the desert during the late 1860s to the turn of the century. Even more, she deeply felt what she had seen; the desperation of emigrants facing the most miserable part of their trek to Californian the barren face of Forty Mile Desert or Black Rock Desert; the fruitless wandering of prospectors in the hills; and Chinese and Indians livings as second-place people in the egocentricity of the white man's ways."

She moved back to California to attend Mills Seminary College, now known as Mills College, in Oakland, California. After completing a degree at Mills Seminary in Oakland, California, Idah married Samuel Hooker Strobridge, stepson of famed railroad builder James Harvey Strobridge. The young couple returned to Nevada and began ranching, but the life was hard on the Strobridge family. All three of their sons died at young ages. James also died, leaving Idah widowed and childless. She continued to ranch on also took up mining on her property.

During this time in her life, she took up writing and taught herself bookbinding as well.

She left Nevada and moved to the Garvanaza neighborhood in Los Angeles, California. Her bungalow on 231 East Avenue 41 also housed her bindery, Artemesia Bindery, and her "Little Corner" gallery. Her residence became a popular place for writers, artists, and craftsmen. She was inducted into the Nevada Writers Hall of Fame in 1997.

== References and further reading ==
- Zanjani, Sally Springmeyer. A mine of her own : women prospectors in the American West, 1850-1950, Lincoln : University of Nebraska Press, 1997.
- Hirahara, Naomi; Knatz, Geraldine; and Lynxwile, J Eric. Terminal Island : lost communities of Los Angeles Harbor, Santa Monica, California : Angel City Press, 2015

== See also ==
Artists of the Arroyo Seco (Los Angeles)
