= Hoosier Art Salon =

- Former logo before name change
- Type: Nonprofit arts organization
- Founded: 1925
- Founder: Daughters of Indiana
- Headquarters: PO Box 40037; Indianapolis, IN 46240
- Key people: Michael Quinn (President, Board of Directors)
- Website: hoosierartsalon.org

The Hoosier Art Salon Annual Exhibition is an annual juried art exhibition that features the work of Indiana artists and provides them with an outlet to market their work. The Hoosier Salon Patron's Association, the nonprofit arts organization that organizes the event, also operates a year-round galleries in New Harmony, Indiana and at one time in Wabash and Carmel, Indiana. These spaces host exhibitions of Salon artists throughout the year, as well as workshops and demonstrations. An artist must have lived in Indiana and must be a member of the Hoosier Salon arts organization to become eligible for the Salon's exhibitions. The Hoosier Salon has exhibited art from many of Indiana's most notable painters, sculptors, cartoonists, and mixed-media artists, including Hoosier Group artists, several members of the Brown County Art Colony, and other artists with ties to Indiana.

The Daughters of Indiana, a group of women who were born in Indiana but resided in the Chicago metropolitan area, hosted the first annual Hoosier Salon in 1925 at the Marshall Field and Company's galleries in Chicago. In 1942 the annual exhibition was relocated to Indianapolis, Indiana, where it has been held at several venues, including the William H. Block Company and the L. S. Ayres and Company department stores, the Indiana State Museum, and the Indiana Historical Society. The Hoosier Salon has survived wars, economic recessions, a fire, venue changes for its annual exhibition, relocation of its offices and gallery spaces, and modifications to its outreach programs. In 2014 the Hoosier Art Salon celebrated its ninetieth continuous year of annual exhibitions.

== Mission ==
The Hoosier Art Salon is a statewide nonprofit arts organization whose mission is to "create an appreciation of art by promoting Hoosier artists and their art." The Salon's exhibitions also provide viewers an opportunity to see and appreciate the talents of artists with ties to Indiana. The organization's vision is to foster an appreciation for visual art through activities that "educate, inspire, and enhance the lives of the citizens of our state while promoting the creativity, talent and technique of Indiana artists."

== History ==
=== Origins in Chicago ===
The idea for the Hoosier Salon originated in May 1924, when the 160-member Daughters of Indiana, a group of women who were born in Indiana but resided in the Chicago metro area, held a gathering devoted to Hoosier painters. Following this initial meeting, Estella King, chair of the group's arts committee, led the organization's plans for an exhibition featuring high quality artwork from Hoosier artists that would help gain more recognition for them outside of Indiana. The group's goals were to inspire Indiana artists to develop their talents, to showcase artists who depicted Indiana themes in their work, and to provide an opportunity to market their art.

The Hoosier Salon's name and concept come from the nineteenth-century French tradition of annual art exhibitions held in the Grand Palais des Champs- Élysées in Paris, France. Chicago, Illinois, was selected as the site for the first Hoosier Salon because of its large population and its reputation as a midwestern art center. The annual Salon ran in Chicago from 1925 through 1941, when it moved to Indianapolis, Indiana. Since January 1942 the annual exhibition has taken place at various sites around Indianapolis.

=== Early exhibitions ===
The first Hoosier Salon ran from March 9 to 19, 1925, at the art galleries of Marshall Field and Company at 28 East Washington Street in Chicago. The Daughters of Indiana, who organized and sponsored the first Salon, were assisted by several other groups, such as the Indiana Society of Chicago and volunteers from Chicago's Earlham College Alumni Association.

The first Hoosier Salon was open to painters who had lived in Indiana for at least a year. Entries for the juried exhibition were submitted from across the United States. The selections featured 253 works of art from 132 artists. Hoosier Group artist T. C. Steele and his wife, Selma, attended the opening of the Salon's first exhibition, which was well received by art critics and the public.

Among the first exhibition's favorites was a set of three "Little Orphan Annie" cartoons from their creator, Harold Gray, a 1917 graduate of Purdue University. Hoosier artists whose work also appeared at the first Salon included all four Hoosier Group members who were still living (T.C. Steele, William Forsyth, Otto Stark, and J. Ottis Adams). Other exhibitors with Indiana ties included Wayman Elbridge Adams, Frank V. Dudley, Frederick M. Polley, J. Will Vawter, Eugene Savage, and Clifton Wheeler, among others. Traditional Indiana landscapes and still-life paintings were represented, as well as works from Hoosier artists who lived outside the state.

At the first Hoosier Salon merit prizes were awarded to Steele for Winter Morning, First Snow, judged best picture and painted by a man more than sixty years of age. Wayman Adams won a $200 merit award for his oil portrait of Indiana author Booth Tarkington, and Forsyth's Glory of Autumn still life won a $100 merit prize. Savage, who was originally from Covington, Indiana, won the top prize of $500 for Recessional. Thirty percent of the accepted entries came from women artists, including two works submitted by Marie Goth. Several women were recognized with merit prizes for their art: Dorothy Morlan for Frosty Morning, Southern Indiana; Lucy M. Taggert for Eleanor; Laura A. Fry for A Shaft of Sunlight; Lucie Hartrath for The Valley, Morning; and Maude Kaufman Eggemeyer for A Garden. Louise Zaring received a prize for Best Marine Scene.

Marguerite B. Williams, art critic for the Chicago Daily News, remarked at the time of the first Salon that Indiana was well known for its writers; however, "it would seem that some of this desire for self-expression has overflowed into painting for there is probably no other state that could show as many and such a high average of practically unknown painters." Hoosier authors Tarkington, George Ade, and Meredith Nicholson supported the idea of an annual exhibition featuring Indiana artists. In the forward to the Hoosier Salon's exhibition catalog in 1926, Nicholson wrote, "we are anxious for our brothers and sisters who paint or draw or sculpt to have their day in court, just as we have had it."

Following the critical and popular success of the first exhibition, the Daughters of Indiana wanted to make it an annual event that was open to artists with ties to Indiana. In 1926 the second Hoosier Salon ran for fourteen days at Marshall Field's galleries in Chicago. It featured 339 works by 149 artists and drew more than 50,000 visitors. For the first time the show was opened to sculpture in addition to paintings. Janet Scudder, a native of Terre Haute, Indiana, who gained an international reputation for her work as a sculptor, earned the $300 merit prize for her outstanding sculpture called Victory. Wayman Adams won the $500 merit prize for the exhibition's outstanding picture, The Art Jury, a life-size portrait of the four surviving members of the Hoosier Group–Steele, Stark, J. Ottis Adams, and Forsyth. (Steele and Stark died by the end of 1926; J. Ottis Adams died in 1927.) William Edouard Scott, a former student of Stark, was one of the first African American artists to participate in the Hoosier Salon. Scott exhibited Lights on a Summer Night at the second Hoosier Salon.

=== Other events ===
In 1926, after the Daughters of Chicago hosted the second exhibition, the group partnered with other art patrons to formally organize the Hoosier Salon Patrons Association, a nonprofit organization that would continue the event and its original mission of recognizing talented Indiana artists. John C. Shaffer, editor and publisher of the Chicago Evening Post, the Indianapolis Star, and newspapers in Muncie, Indiana, and Terre Haute, Indiana, became the Association's first president. Estella King, a native of Peru, Indiana, and chair of the Daughters of Indiana art committee for the first two Hoosier Salons, became the group's executive chairman. In addition to the Hoosier Salon Patrons Association, ongoing sponsors and supporters of the annual Hoosier Salon have included Kappa Kappa Kappa, first connected to the Salon in 1927; Delta Sigma Kappa sorority, a supporter since 1937; and Psi Iota Xi, a sponsor since 1941.

In addition to hosting the annual Salon during its seventeen-year run in Illinois, the patron's association opened a year-round gallery on October 15, 1928, in donated space in the Chicago Evening Post Building on West Wacker Drive. Art that had appeared in at least one of the Salons could be exhibited and sold at the Chicago gallery. The Association also hosted traveling exhibitions, a tradition that continued over the years.

For a brief time the group's Hoosier Program Bureau, which was formed in 1929, helped Hoosier musicians secure public appearances. The offering was discontinued in 1941, when the Salon moved its headquarters to Indianapolis and the group decided to focus on visual arts.

During its early years, not all of the Salon's exhibitions were held in Chicago. In June 1936 the Hoosier Salon held its annual exhibition during the summer months at the Spink-Wawasee Hotel at Lake Wawasee in Indiana. In 1937 the Art Department of the Woman's Department Club of Indianapolis sponsored a traveling Hoosier Salon exhibition at the William H. Block Company's department store in downtown Indianapolis. Following the success of this event in Indianapolis and continued support from the department store, the Woman's Department Club was instrumental in helping to move the Salon's headquarters and its annual exhibition to Indianapolis in 1942. Around this same time several of the early leaders in Chicago began to retire, moved away, or experienced failing health, so it was not unexpected that on June 30, 1941, the Salon's trustees formally voted to approve the move of its headquarters to Indianapolis.

=== Indiana years ===
In late 1941 the Hoosier Salon Patrons Association moved into two donated rooms in the State Life Building (also known as the Thomas Building) on Washington Street in Indianapolis. These rooms also served as the Association's art gallery until 1973, when fire destroyed the building. After the Salon's relocation to Indiana, several new sponsors began their longtime support of the Hoosier Salon. Representatives from the Woman's Department Club and its Art Department, Kappa Kappa Kappa, Psi Iota Xi, and women from the Indiana Federation of Clubs and the Indiana Federation of Art Clubs formed the Hoosier Salon Executive Committee.

After the move from Chicago, the Association's next annual Hoosier Salon opened in downtown Indianapolis on January 19, 1942, for a two-week run in the sixth-floor auditorium of the William H. Block Company department store at Market and Illinois Streets. The event took place shortly after the bombing at Pearl Harbor, and the war effort "dominated the show." Lillian Alt's Men and Guns and William A. Eyden Jr.'s Steel for Defense were among the 261 pieces on display. The annual Salon was scaled back during World War II, and the wartime themes that continued for several years frequently outnumbered the usual landscapes, still lifes, and portraits.

In 1949 the Hoosier Salon marked its twenty-fifth year, a significant achievement that also achieved national recognition. After the Salon's run in Indianapolis, a special exhibition featuring all 168 pieces from the Indiana show were exhibited at the Smithsonian Institution's National Museum of American Art in April 1949. The Indiana State Society of Washington, D.C., sponsored two fund-raising events for the Salon's exhibition in Washington, D.C.—a style show at the Mayflower Hotel and a dance at the Shoreham Hotel, where Hoosier songwriter Hoagy Carmichael and his wife, Ruth, were special guests.

In the 1950s several artists who had contributed to the first exhibitions in Chicago continued to submit works for the Salons, including Polley, Wheeler, and Wayman Adams, among others. Salons in the 1960s marked the changing times for Hoosier artists with the introduction of new materials, such as prints, metal sculpture, collage, and fewer of the more traditional landscapes of southern Indiana.

Just a few weeks before the Hoosier Salon's fiftieth anniversary exhibition of 1974, disaster struck. On November 5, 1973, a fire destroyed the Thomas Building, including the Salon's historical materials and 311 paintings. The Association established temporary offices at the back of the William A. Block department store's auditorium and resumed plans for the annual exhibition. A Lilly Endowment grant of $5,000 and additional $1,000 contributions from several sponsors allowed the Hoosier Salon to open in January 1974, although the other planned events were cancelled. The Salon's fiftieth anniversary exhibition included 163 pieces from 117 different artists. Goth and William A. Eyden Jr. were honored at the annual event. Both of these artists had contributed art for the original exhibition in 1925.

The annual Hoosier Salon exhibition remained at Block's department store in Indianapolis from 1942 to 1977. The event moved to the L. S. Ayres department store in downtown Indianapolis at Meridian and Washington Streets in 1978, and remained there until 1989. From 1990 to 2011 the annual exhibition was held at the Indiana State Museum. In 2012 the exhibition moved to the Indiana Historical Society's Eugene and Marilyn Glick Indiana History Center in Indianapolis. The annual juried art exhibition continues to showcase the works of Hoosier artists from all walks of life. In 2014 the Hoosier Salon celebrated its ninetieth consecutive annual exhibition.

In November 1974 the Hoosier Salon purchased the Victorian-era Bals-Wocher mansion on Indianapolis's North Delaware Street as the new location for its year-round gallery. Because the nonprofit did not have the funds to operate two galleries, it closed its gallery in the former Indianapolis Hilton Hotel lobby at Meridian and Ohio Streets in December 1974. By 1978 the Bals-Wocher mansion proved too costly for the group to maintain, so the Salon sold it and moved its gallery to the Morrison Opera building on Indianapolis's South Meridian Street, where it had been renting office space.

In March 1991 the Association relocated its offices to North College Avenue in Indianapolis's Broad Ripple Village, where it had previously established a year-round gallery. The Hoosier Salon operated two other galleries in addition to the one in Broad Ripple. One gallery was at New Harmony, Indiana; the other at Wabash, Indiana. As of 2014 the Hoosier Salon maintained gallery space at New Harmony, but the Wabash gallery closed and the property owner converted it to another purpose.

Although the annual Hoosier Salon remains the organization's biggest event, it also provides other outreach efforts. In 2006 the Hoosier Salon initiated the French tradition of a Salon Des Refusés (exhibition of rejects) at its Broad Ripple gallery. The Salon also provides educational outreach to schools and collaborates with other organizations to promote the arts.

In May 2014 the Hoosier Salon closed its main gallery in Broad Ripple and moved to a new gallery space in the Carmel Arts and Design District in Carmel, Indiana.

== Hoosier Salon artists ==
Since 1925, many of Indiana's most notable artists have exhibited at the Hoosier Salon. In order to qualify as a Salon exhibitor, an artist must be a Hoosier Salon member and must have lived in Indiana for a minimum of one year at any point during their life. Salon entries are independently reviewed by experienced judges in the art field and selected for the annual exhibition. The works of well-established master artists are displayed alongside the work of newcomers to the field.

The annual Hoosier Salon claims ties to the Hoosier Group and several members of the Brown County Art Colony. However, not all of the Salon's art has Indiana as it subject. Work from Salon artists with Hoosier ties is inspired from locales outside Indiana as well. New York City-based Wayman Adams, born near Muncie, Indiana, exhibited his artwork at the Salon for thirty-five years. Several southwestern artists were linked to Indiana as well. Shelbyville, Indiana, native William Victor Higgins, who was a member of New Mexico's "Taos Ten", and Gustave Baumann, who worked in Brown County, Indiana, for seven years before moving to Santa Fe, New Mexico, in 1918, were Salon exhibitors. Fairmount, Indiana, native Olive Rush, whose art studio was in Santa Fe, was a Salon prizewinner.

In the past, Hoosier cartoonists have been well represented at the Salons. In addition to comic-strip illustrator Harold Gray's "Little Orphan Annie", cartoonists who competed for the Salon's prizes and recognition were Frank McKinney "Kin" Hubbard's nationally syndicated "Abe Martin" cartoons; Gaar Williams, who created "Among the Folks in History"; Fontaine Fox, creator of the syndicated cartoon"Toonerville Trolley"; and Pulitzer Prize-winner John T. McCutcheon, who drew editorial cartoons. Gray, Hubbard, Williams, and McCutcheon also provided artwork to help advertise the Salon.

In more recent years Salon entries have changed to reflect the new artistic styles of Hoosier artists. Past Salon works have included Kanwal Prakash (K. P.) Singh's architectural renderings, lithographs from Garo Z. Antreasian, watercolors from Floyd Hopper, portraits by Nancy Noel, the acrylics of James Lee Cunningham, and abstract art from Martha Slaymaker.

=== Previous Salon exhibitors ===
The following is a partial list of past exhibitors:

- J. Ottis Adams
- Wayman Elbridge Adams
- Lillian Alt
- Garo Z. Antreasian
- Gustave Baumann
- Beulah H. Brown
- Francis Focer Brown
- Gianni Cilfone
- James Lee Cunningham
- Robert Davidson
- Frank V. Dudley
- Maude Kaufman Eggemeyer
- William A. Eyden Jr.
- William Forsyth
- Fontaine Fox
- Laura A. Fry
- Marie Goth
- Harold Gray
- John Wesley Hardrick
- Lucie Hartrath
- William Victor Higgins
- Floyd Hopper
- Frank McKinney "Kin" Hubbard
- John T. McCutcheon
- Dorothy Morlan
- Sister Esther Newport
- Nancy Noel
- Frederick M. Polley
- Antoine Raemaekers
- Olive Rush
- Eugene Savage
- Ferdinand Louis Schlemmer
- William Edouard Scott
- Janet Scudder
- Kanwal Prakash (K. P.) Singh
- Martha Slaymaker
- Otto Stark
- T.C. Steele
- Lucy M. Taggert
- J. Will Vawter
- Clifton Wheeler
- Gaar Williams
- Edward Horace Nicholson

== Awards ==
The Hoosier Salon became known for "offering one of the richest purses in the United States." For the first Hoosier Salon in 1925 the top merit prize was $500, and the total merit prize money was $4,375. In 2009 its best of show won a record $10,000, and the total merit prize money for that year exceeded $25,000.
