= Stephen Pace =

Stephen Pace may refer to:

- Stephen Pace (artist) (1918–2010), American painter
- Stephen Pace (politician) (1891–1970), American politician and lawyer
