= Mary Howey Murray Vawter =

American artist

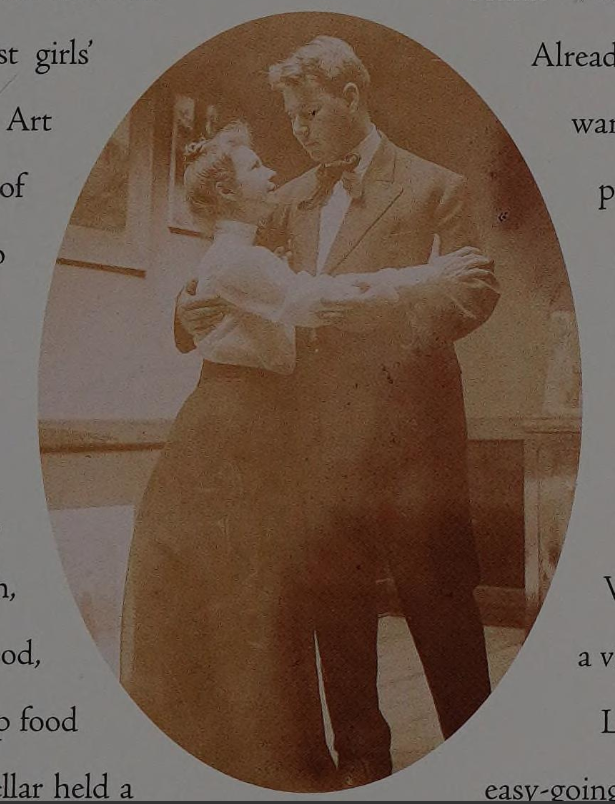
- Mary Howey Murray Vawter and John William Vawter
- Born: June 30, 1871; Baltimore
- Died: March 28, 1950 (aged 78); Mathews
- Occupation: Artist, poet, writer
- Spouse(s): Will Vawter

Mary Howey Murray Vawter (June 30, 1871 – March 28, 1950) was an American artist, poet, and political candidate. She was the first wife of artist John William Vawter.

Mary Howey Murray Vawter was born on June 30, 1871 in Baltimore, Maryland. She was the daughter of Heron Campbell Murray, an architectural designer and member of the Maryland House of Delegates, and Cordelia Cary Williams. After Heron Murray died in 1880, his widow raised Mary and her three siblings at their home Riverlawn, near Mathews, Virginia.

Mary Murray attended Western Female High School and Sarah N. Randolph's school. She studied art at the Maryland Institute and the Charcoal Club of Baltimore.

On a trip to the midwest, Murray met Indiana artist John William Vawter. Three months later, they married in November 1902. They both spent the spring of 1903 at the Art Students League of New York. where she studied portraiture under Irving Wiles.

They relocated to Greenfield, Indiana, in the summer of 1903, then to a farm in Nashville, Indiana, in 1908. Going from an upper-class east coast upbringing to the rural midwest was an adjustment for Mary Vawter, especially since she was tasked with supervising farming, home construction, financial matters, and keeping her husband focused on his work. They divorced in 1919. She stayed in Nashville despite difficulties getting along with the local citizens. They had differing views (she supported women's suffrage and prohibition and opposed animal cruelty) and she developed a reputation for cantankerousness, at one point becoming embroiled in a lawsuit over a haystack. In 1934, she ran in the Democratic primary to represent Indiana's 9th congressional district and came in third out of three candidates.

During this time, she exhibited her paintings throughout Indiana. She began publishing poetry in the 1930s and published the volume The Earth Is Awakening, and Other Poems in 1946. She wrote an unpublished memoir of her marriage called Life With A Genius. She also wrote works about local history and genealogy.

In 1947 she sold her Nashville property and moved back to Virginia to live near family. Mary Howey Murray Vawter died on March 28, 1950, in Mathews.
