= Ralph Wickiser =

American artist

Ralph Lewanda Wickiser
- Born: Greenup, Illinois, U.S.
- Known for: Artist

Ralph Lewanda Wickiser (1910–1998) was an American artist. He is most notable for painting in the styles of both Abstraction and representation, and for synthesizing the two in his own innovative style.

== Youth ==
Wickiser was born in Greenup, Illinois. His earliest known paintings are watercolor landscapes from his second grade class, which showed notable talent for such a young artist.

== Education and early works ==
At the age of 18, Wickiser studied life drawing at the Art Institute of Chicago Illinois, but due to the Depression, he soon became unable to support himself and was forced to return to Greenup. At his mother's suggestion, he enrolled at Eastern Illinois University and earned his B.A. there. He expressed frustration at the lack of modern art education in America at that time. During his studies at Eastern Illinois University a reputable artist from Brown County, Paul Turner Sargent (1880–1946) became a mentor to Wickiser and taught him a great deal about painting. The two would often paint outdoors together.

It was at Eastern Illinois University that Wickiser met Jane Ann Bisson, who became his wife in 1936. They later had three children, Eric in 1942, Lydia in 1945, and Walter in 1952.

After earning his BA in 1934, Wickiser went to New York to visit Columbia University. He was awarded a residency at the Tiffany Foundation in Oyster Bay, where he stayed to paint for the summer. He exhibited at the Grand Central Art Galleries in April 1934, and one of his paintings was featured and reviewed in ARTnews. This was a major turning point for Wickiser.

Continuing to work in two styles, back and forth between abstraction and representation, Wickiser exhibited his paintings at multiple venues, including Rockefeller Center in New York. Also in 1936, he began teaching at the Louisiana State University at Baton Rouge while also studying for a Ph.D. in philosophy at Peabody College at Vanderbilt University. His work was included in a traveling exhibition called "A New Southern Group" that was shown at many museums, including the High Museum in Atlanta, Georgia.

== Woodstock, Louisiana and the war years ==
In the summer of 1939, Wickiser first went to Woodstock, New York to study color Lithography with Emil Ganso. He fell in love with the Catskill Mountains as well as the artist colony of Woodstock. After that, he and Jane returned to Woodstock each summer. There he met Franz Kline, Barnett Newman, and Yasuo Kuniyoshi, who became a good friend. Kuniyoshi threw a party for Ralph and Jane at his house, introducing them to many artist friends. Ralph invited Kuniyoshi and Paul Burlin to LSU to lecture to students. While in Woodstock, Wickiser established friendships with Arnold Blanch, Paul Burlin, Rollin Crampton, Doris Lee, Eddie Millman, Milton Avery, Philip Guston, and Barnett Newman. He affectionately referred to Newman as "Barney."

In the summer of 1940, Wickiser traveled to Guadalajara and Taxco in Mexico, where they visited with Diego Rivera. Jane said of Rivera, "He was so ugly he was beautiful." That summer Wickiser painted a watercolor series in plein air in the marketplaces of Guadalajara and Taxco.

In 1941, Wickiser was named Chair of the Art Department at Louisiana State University in Baton Rouge. During the years of the war, he enlisted in the Navy and was stationed in Washington, D.C. In 1942 he had exhibitions at the Corcoran Gallery in Washington, D.C., the San Francisco Museum, and the Oakland Museum of California. The Delgado Museum in New Orleans, (now the New Orleans Museum of Art), granted him a solo show in 1943. After that, he had shows at the Dayton Art Institute in Ohio (1944) and the Associated American Artist Gallery in New York (1946). In 1947 his work was shown at the Dallas Museum of Art in Texas, and ten of his color lithographs were reproduced in the article "The American Highway" in The Lamp, published by Standard Oil, New Jersey. In 1948-49, Ford Motor Company commissioned Ralph to do a watercolor series for their magazine, The Ford Times. The Library of Congress showed his work in 1948 at the Annual Print Exhibition. He continued to paint abstraction, figures, landscapes, and combinations of these, striving to reconcile them in his mind.

In 1949, Wickiser bought land in Woodstock and built a house and studio. In 1950, he held a conference at the Woodstock Artists Association, which featured talks by Franz Kline, Robert Motherwell, and Yasuo Kuniyoshi. In 1951, Wickiser hosted the Fourth Annual Conference on art at the same venue, including speakers Herman Cherry, Franz Kline, Yasuo Kuniyoshi, Robert Motherwell, Barnett Newman, and Ben Shahn. Kuniyoshi assisted wickiser with the conferences.

Wickiser exhibited his work at the Metropolitan Museum of Art in 1950 and at the Pennsylvania Academy in 1951.

== Writing ==
Wickiser wrote for the Encyclopedia of the Arts as a contributing editor in 1946. Due to the lack of good textbooks on modern art as well as his interest in art education, Wickiser wrote An Introduction to Art Activities in 1947, which was published by Henry Holt and Co. The book soon became one of the most prevalent textbooks for teaching art in colleges and universities in subsequent years. He also co-authored Mardi Gras Day in 1947 with Caroline Duriex and John McCrady, two other well-known Louisiana artists. This book featured Wickiser's lithographs, inspired by photographs he had taken of Mardi Gras.

Later, in 1956, Wickiser wrote his most popular book, An Introduction to Art Education, published by the World Book Company in 1957.

== Working in abstraction ==
From 1950 to 1968, Wickiser's work was non-objective. Inspired by Grunewald's Isenheim Altarpiece, which he considered one of the greatest works ever made, he painted the abstract series Compassion I (1950–1958) and Compassion II (1959–1968). The Compassion I paintings were meant to be uplifting and give a sense of resurrection through square shaped panels and color glazes.

The 1953 Annual Exhibition of Contemporary American Painting at the Whitney Museum included Wickiser's work, along with the work of Milton Avery, /Ralston Crawford, Willem de Kooning, Adolph Gottlieb, Philip Guston, Georgia O'Keeffe, and Jackson Pollock. In 1954 he had an exhibition at the Cincinnati Museum, meanwhile he continued to exhibit work at the Woodstock Artist Association. His lithographs were shown in a State Department traveling show in Europe from 1954-1956. [2]

== New York City and Pratt Institute ==
In 1953, Wickiser left Louisiana State University to become director of the art education division at the State University of New York at New Paltz, and after a brief stint at SUNY, he moved on to become Chair of the Undergraduate Art Department at Pratt Institute in Brooklyn. In 1959, he had exhibitions at the Brooklyn Museum, Long Island University, and The Momentum Institute of Design in Chicago. In 1962, he became Director of the Division of Graduate Programs in Art and Design at Pratt Institute. Fellow faculty included Ernie Briggs, Herman Cherry, Ed Dougmore, Franz Klein, Jacob Lawrence, George McNeil, Stephen Pace, and Philip Pearlstein. Wickiser became close friends with Lawrence, McNeil, and Pace. [2]

In the early to mid-1960s, Wickiser continued to paint in pure abstraction, creating Compassion II, a series of mostly 8' x 6' paintings, while the work became more Expressionist in style. [2]

His work was shown in exhibitions at the Woodstock Artist Association in 1960,1961,1963, and 1969. He also had exhibitions at the Main Gallery at Pratt in 1960, 1966, and 1968 through 1971. [2]

== Return to figuration ==
In the mid-1960s, after 17 years of painting in abstraction, Wickiser renewed his interest in the figure and began to attend studio sessions to study the figure with other faculty members. He began a series based on photographs he had taken. In his figurative work, however, there is still much abstraction. Many of the works are triptychs and relate to reflections in the mirror, a theme that he would carry through in his work for the rest of his life. He continued to paint this series until 1972, approximately 7 years. [2]

== Synthesis ==
In the early 1970s, Wickiser began to paint from photographs of boulders in New Paltz, NY, photographs which he had taken years earlier. This resulted in the Four Seasons series, which was shown in 1975 at the Pacem en Terris Gallery at the United Nations in New York. These paintings represented the synthesis of abstraction and representation, informed by all of the styles and themes he had been using since the beginning of his career. The inclusion of rocks in his work as animate objects, as well as the combination of representation and abstraction, are aspects that would characterize Ralph's work for the rest of his life, most notably in the Reflected Stream series.

== Photography ==
In 1975, Wickiser and his wife retired to their home in Woodstock, and devoted himself to painting full-time. He began to use the camera as a major reference tool, mainly to photograph his natural surroundings. While walking, a few fields away from his studio, Wickiser came upon a stream called the Vredenburg, which he began to photograph regularly. He found great interest in the reflections of its pools of water, especially in a part of the stream that separated into three pools. These pools became the subject of hundreds of his photographs, in which he captured the intricacies of the light, water, and rocks and the reflections of trees and sky. A plethora of new imagery became available to him, frozen by the high-speed camera.

Wickiser used his photographs only as a reference, making the final image the result of his own personal style. He was especially attracted to the ugliness in these reflections of nature, because he said, "that's where the beauty is." Through painting the stream reflections, he further refined his synthesis of representation and abstraction.

== Mid to late career ==
In the 1960s and 1970s, Wickiser was featured in the Blue Book, Who's Who in America, Who's Who in the United States, Who's Who in American Art, Who's Who in the East, The National Register of Prominent Americans & International Notables, The New York Art Year Book, and many other publications. In 1974 and 1978, he had exhibitions at Harriman College in Harriman, NY. In 1976 and 1978, he exhibited his work at Lotus Gallery, Soho, NY, one of Soho's first galleries. During the 1980s his works were shown in Boston, New York, and Washington, D.C. galleries.

In 1985 the stream paintings became significantly more abstract than the paintings of 1975-1985. From 1985 until his death in 1998, the stream was a constant source of inspiration and a vehicle for the meeting of abstraction and representation.

In 1990, Wickiser traveled to New Orleans, Louisiana to exhibit his work at Gallery 630B after a nearly thirty-five year absence.

In 1990, Wickiser's son Walter became Director of the Z Gallery, one of the first galleries from Mainland China to open its doors in America. The Z Gallery showed Wickiser's work along with painters of the Star Star Group from Beijing. Later, in 1992, Walter opened his own gallery in Soho, where he showed Ralph's work alongside the work of old friends George McNeil and Stephen Pace. In 1993, Wickiser exhibited at the Haenah Kent Gallery in Soho, and he showed his work at the Haenah Kent Gallery in Seoul, Korea in 1994. In 1997, Wickiser's work was shown in a solo exhibit at The Gallery at the Roundabout Theatre in Times Square, NY, a show that was featured on several television programs made by Images Art, New York and aired on Manhattan and Paragon Cable Television channels. During the 1990s Ralph's exhibitions were reviewed in many publications, including ARTnews, Art in America, The New York Times, Asahi Art Pictorial, Tokyo, Japan, and Art Vision, Tokyo, Japan.

Around 1987, Wickiser turned his attention to his apple trees, which he covered with Cheesecloth to keep birds away from the apples. The light and shadow created by the draped fabric, branches, and leaves became a new fascination for him, which he painted in the years that followed. [1]

In 1996, Wickiser found yet another subject, the patterns and shapes of the shadows cast from trees on his backyard in Woodstock. This resulted in the series Shadows on the Grass, which he worked on along with The Reflected Stream and The Covered Apple Tree, the 3 series that occupied his focus during his last years. He continued to walk on the 200-foot grass path to his studio as he had for the past 39 years, until three months before he died in October 1998. [1]

== Awards and honors ==
1934,39 Louis Comfort Tiffany Fellowship, Oyster Bay, Long Island, NY
1946,48 Louisiana State Research Council Grant, Baton Rouge, LA
1952 Fund for the Advancement of Education Grant
1956 Honorary Ph.D., Eastern Illinois University, Charleston, IL
1964 Distinguished Alumni Award, Eastern Illinois University, Charleston, IL
1971-75 Harriman College, Member of the Board of Trustees, Harriman, NY
1975 Professor Emeritus, Pratt Institute, Brooklyn, NY

== Selected bibliography ==
Periodicals
"Tiffany Artists are Now on View at Grand Central". The Art News. New York. October 27, 1934.
Devree, Howard (1934). "In the Galleries: Rowlandson to Fledgelings". New York Times.
"In One-Man Exhibit Here". The Nashville Tennessean. Tennessee. May 16, 1936.
Jenkins, Jerry (May 15, 1940). "Works of Wickiser Shown in Exhibition".
"Wickiser Show". Morning Advocate. Baton Rouge, LA. March 30, 1940.
"Wickiser Paints with Prolific Brush". The Summer Reveille. Baton Rouge, LA. August 18, 1942.
Giloin, Aida Mumford (February 1948). "Louisiana Trapper Paintings by Ralph Wickiser". Ford Times. Dearborn, MI. p. 42.
Bier, Justin (March 23, 1952). "Wickiser Work". The Courier-Journal. Louisville, KY. p. 5,4.
"Wickiser Paints with Prolific Brush". The Summer Reveille. Baton Rouge, LA. August 18, 1942.
Rivers, Bill (November 29, 1953). "Ph.D. With a Palette". Morning Advocate Magazine. Baton Rouge, LA.
Bartczak, Peter (1966). "Wickiser: The Work and the Man". Prattler. Brooklyn, NY.
"Ralph Wickiser - Lotus". The Village Voice. New York. April 19, 1976.
"Ralph Wickiser: New Look in Landscape Painting". Woodstock Times. Woodstock, NY. November 19, 1982.
George, Jean Craigshead (December 23, 1990). "Woodstock's Wickiser Featured in Two Shows". Sunday Freeman. Kingston, NY. p. 7.
Twine, Tinker (December 20, 1990). "Natural Man: Artist Limns Rock and Stream with Easy Grace". Woodstock Times. Woodstock, NY. p. 20.
Nakayama, Mikiko (August 1995). "Ralph Wickiser: Nature is the Most Beautiful". New York Magazine. p. 26.
Gladstone, Valerie (October 1997). "Ralph Wickiser". ARTnews. p. 166.
"Ralph Wickiser, 88, Painter and Professor". New York Times. November 1998.
Henry, Gerrit (December 1999). "The Four Seasons". Art in America.
Cleveland, David Adams (October 2003). "Reviews: The Reflected Stream, The Early Years 1975-1985". ARTnews.
Arbogast, Joanne (November 8, 2007). "Lore Degenstein Gallery Present Ralph Wickiser Exhibition". The Daily Item. Selinsgrove, PA. p. 4.
Greben, Deidre S. (June 2009). "A Retrospective: 1934-1998" Paintings Ralph L. Wickiser, Ruth S. Harley University Center Gallery, Adelphi University". Art News Reviews.

Cleveland, David Adams (May 1, 2009). Wickiser, Walter (ed.). Ralph L. Wickiser The Reflected Stream, The Early Years 1975-1985. Walter Wickiser Gallery, Inc. ISBN 978-0692000342.
Cleveland, David Adams (May 22, 2012). Wickiser, Walter (ed.). Ralph L. Wickiser: The Reflected Stream, The Abstract Years 1985-1998. Walter Wickiser Gallery, Inc. ISBN 978-0615597430.
Wickiser Tortora, Lydia; Wickiser, Walter (June 4, 2013). Wickiser, Walter (ed.). Ralph L. Wickiser: The Covered Apple Tree 1987-1998 and Shadows on the Grass 1996-1998. Walter Wickiser Gallery, Inc. ISBN 978-0615760643.

== Selected exhibitions ==
"Queens International 2013", Queens Museum, Queens, NY, January 2014
"Ralph Wickiser a Retrospective 1934-1998", Susquehanna University, Selinsgrove, PA, November, 2007
"A Retrospective: 1934-1998" Paintings Ralph L. Wickiser, Ruth S. Harley University Center Gallery, Adelphi University, March 1–31, 2009.
