= Frank Dudley =

Frank Dudley may refer to:

- Frank Dudley (footballer) (1925–2012), English footballer
- Frank V. Dudley (1868–1957), American artist
- Frank A. Dudley (1864–1945), American lawyer, politician and business owner
