= List of Psi Iota Xi chapters =

Psi Iota Xi is a women's philanthropic and cultural sorority with chapters throughout the midwestern United States. The sorority was formed in 1897 at Central High School in Muncie, Indiania. It was originally a high school sorority but changed to become a community-based sorority after Indiana state laws prohibited Greek letter societies in public schools.

Following is an incomplete chapter list, with active chapters indicated in bold and inactive chapters in italics.

Number	Chapter	Charter date and range	Institution	Location	Status	Ref.
1	**Alpha**	September 19, 1897	Central High School	Muncie, Indiana	Active	
2	Beta	December 26, 1900	Evansville High School	Evansville, Indiana	Inactive	
3	Gamma	April 3, 1903	North High School	Columbus, Ohio	Inactive	
4	Delta	1903	Shortridge High School	Indianapolis, Indiana	Inactive	
5	**Epsilon**	June 10, 1904	Columbus High School	Columbus, Indiana	Active	
6	**Zeta**	November 19, 1904 – April 11, 1907; June 26, 1908	Bloomington High School	Bloomington, Indiana	Active	(Note: Chapter formed from the L. V. F. Club (local).) (Note: In April 1907, the chapter returned its charter, giving up its association with Bloomington High School to comply with state anti-Greek regulations. However, the chapter was reestablished once the sorority voted to become town-based in June 1908.)
7	Eta	November 1906	Steele High School	Dayton, Ohio	Inactive	
8	Theta	December 1908		New Castle, Indiana	Inactive	
9	**Iota**	December 30, 1908		Rushville, Indiana	Active	
10	**Kappa**	December 31, 1908		Kokomo, Indiana	Active	
11	Lambda	19xx ?		Bedford, Indiana	Inactive	
12	Mu	19xx ?		Columbus, Indiana	Inactive	
13?	Nu?	July 1910		Richmond, Indiana	Inactive	
14	Xi	191x ?			Inactive	
15	Omicron	191x ?			Inactive	
16	**Psi**	August 9, 1919		Fort Wayne, Indiana	Active	
17	**Rho**	June 16, 1916		Angola, Indiana	Active	
18	**Sigma**	1917		Greensburg, Indiana	Active	
19	Tau	19xx ?			Inactive	
20	**Upsilon**	April 2, 1920		Greenfield, Indiana	Active	
21	**Phi**	July 26, 1920		Huntington, Indiana	Active	
22	**Chi**	April 1921		Brookston, Indiana	Active	
23	Psi	192x ?			Inactive	
24	**Omega**	November 12, 1921		Lebanon, Indiana	Active	
25	Alpha Alpha	192x ?			Inactive	
26	**Alpha Beta**	April 15, 1922		Seymour, Indiana	Active	
27	Alpha Gamma	192x ?			Inactive	
28	**Alpha Delta**	May 23, 1922		Decatur, Indiana	Active	
29	Alpha Epsilon	192x ?		Indiana	Inactive	
30	**Alpha Zeta**	1923		Thorntown, Indiana	Active	
31	**Alpha Eta**	October 19, 1923		Bluffton, Indiana	Active	
32	**Alpha Theta**	December 1, 1923		Charlestown, Indiana	Active	
33	**Alpha Iota**	1924		Richmond, Indiana	Active	
34	Alpha Kappa	192x ?		Franklin, Indiana	Inactive	
35	**Alpha Lambda**	1924		Zionsville, Indiana	Active	
36	**Alpha Mu**	1925		Hartford City, Indiana	Active	
37	Alpha Nu	192x ?		Markle, Indiana	Inactive	
38	**Alpha Xi**	August 11, 1925		Logansport, Indiana	Active	
39	**Alpha Omicron**	February 1926		Vincennes, Indiana	Active	
40	**Alpha Pi**	February 27, 1926		Scottsburg, Indiana	Active	
41	**Alpha Rho**	August 1926		Garrett, Indiana	Active	
42	Alpha Sigma	192x ?		Princeton, Indiana	Inactive	
43	Alpha Tau	1927		Petersburg, Indiana	Inactive	
44	Alpha Upsilon	192x ?			Inactive	
45	**Alpha Phi**	September 1927		Fortville, Indiana	Active	
46	**Alpha Chi**	December 29, 1927		Hagerstown, Indiana	Active	
47	**Alpha Psi**	April 27, 1928		Washington, Indiana	Active	
48	**Alpha Omega**	February 1928		North Vernon, Indiana	Active	
49	**Beta Alpha**	June 12, 1928		Flora, Indiana	Active	
50	**Beta Beta**	May 28, 1928		Sullivan, Indiana	Active	
51	**Beta Gamma**	June 1929		Peru, Indiana	Active	
52	**Beta Delta**	September 1929		Van Wert, Ohio	Active	
53	**Beta Epsilon**	September 7, 1929		Mentone, Indiana	Active	
54	**Beta Zeta**	1930		Summitville, Indiana	Active	
55	Beta Eta	193x ?		Richmond, Indiana	Inactive	
57	**Beta Iota**	1932		Farmland, Indiana	Active	
58	Beta Kappa	1933		Bloomfield, Indiana	Inactive	
59	**Beta Lambda**	May 1933		Bedford, Indiana	Active	
60	**Beta Mu**	November 4, 1933		Brownstown, Indiana	Active	
61	Beta Nu	193x ?		East Chicago, Indiana	Inactive	
62	**Beta Xi**	August 3, 1934		Crown Point, Indiana	Active	
63	Beta Omicron	193x ?			Inactive	
64	**Beta Pi**	April 23, 1934		Cambridge City, Indiana	Active	
65	**Beta Rho**	January 18, 1935		Goshen, Indiana	Active	
66	**Beta Sigma**	May 1935		Austin, Indiana	Active	
67	**Beta Tau**	May 23, 1936		Frankfort, Indiana	Active	
68	**Beta Upsilon**	May 1937		Mount Vernon, Ohio	Active	
69	**Beta Phi**	January 14, 1938		Shelbyville, Indiana	Active	
70	Beta Chi	193x ?		Crown Point, Indiana	Inactive	
71	**Beta Psi**	September 28, 1939		Delphi, Indiana	Active	
72	Beta Omega	19xx ?		New Albany, Indiana	Inactive	
73	**Gamma Alpha**	June 10, 1940		Portland, Indiana	Active	
74	**Gamma Beta**	June 21, 1941		Remington, Indiana	Active	
75	Gamma Gamma	194x ?			Inactive	
76	**Gamma Delta**	September 26, 1941		Attica, Indiana	Active	
77	Gamma Epsilon	194x ?			Inactive	
78	**Gamma Zeta**	March 17, 1945		Ossian, Indiana	Active	
79	**Gamma Eta**	October 5, 1946		Knightstown, Indiana	Active	
80	**Gamma Theta**	June 8, 1948		Speedway, Indiana	Active	
81	**Gamma Iota**	August 16, 1948		Shoals, Indiana	Active	
82	Gamma Kappa	19xx ?		Brook, Indiana	Inactive	
83	Gamma Lambda	19xx ?		Paris Crossing, Indiana	Inactive	
84	Gamma Mu	19xx ?		Lafayette, Indiana	Inactive	
85	**Gamma Nu**	November 5, 1950		Brownsburg, Indiana	Active	
86	**Gamma Xi**	October 16, 1956		Crawfordsville, Indiana	Active	
87	Gamma Omicron	195x ?		Montpeller, Ohio]]	Inactive	
88	Gamma Pi	195x ?		Indianapolis, Indiana	Inactive	
89	Gamma Rho	May 19, 1952 – April 30, 2022		Linton, Indiana	Inactive	
90	**Gamma Sigma**	May 17, 1953		South Bend, Indiana	Active	
91	**Gamma Tau**	April 25, 1954		Marion, Indiana	Active	
92	**Gamma Upsilon**	May 15, 1955		Wolcott, Indiana	Active	
93	Gamma Phi	195x ?			Inactive	
94	Gamma Chi	195x ?			Inactive	
95	Gamma Psi	195x ?			Inactive	
96	Gamma Omega	1956		Tipton, Indiana	Inactive	
97	Delta Alpha	195x ?			Inactive	
98	Delta Beta	1929		Indianapolis, Indiana	Inactive	
99	Delta Gamma	195x ?		Fort Wayne, Indiana	Inactive	
100	Delta Delta	195x ?			Inactive	
101	Delta Epsilon	c. 1946		Muncie, Indiana	Inactive	
102	**Delta Zeta**	April 29, 1940		Lafayette, Indiana	Active	
145	Zeta Alpha	19xx ?		Charlestown, Indiana	Inactive	
146	**Zeta Beta**	April 7, 1957		Anderson, Indiana	Active	
147	**Zeta Gamma**	October 6, 1957		Fort Branch, Indiana	Active	
148	Zeta Delta	195x ?		Montpelier, Indiana	Inactive	
149	**Zeta Epsilon**	June 1, 1958		Bargersville, Indiana	Active	
150	Zeta Zeta	195x ?		Indiana	Inactive	
151	Zeta Eta	195x ?		Southport, Indiana	Inactive	
152	**Zeta Theta**	February 14, 1959		Niles, Michigan	Active	
153	**Zeta Iota**	March 8, 1959		Louisville, Kentucky	Active	
154	Zeta Kappa	September 1959		Whiting, Indiana	Inactive	
155	**Zeta Lambda**	September 27, 1959		Connersville, Indiana	Active	
156	**Zeta Mu**	October 30, 1959		Jasper, Indiana	Active	
157	Zeta Nu	19xx ?		Westport, Indiana	Inactive	
158	**Zeta Xi**	March 1960		Madison, Indiana	Active	
159	Zeta Omicron	196x ?		Arthur, Indiana	Inactive	
160	Zeta Pi	196x ?		Highland, Indiana	Inactive	
161	Zeta Rho	June 1961		Munster, Indiana	Inactive	
162	**Zeta Sigma**	1964		Greenwood, Indiana	Active	
163	**Zeta Tau**	October 11, 1964		Milroy, Indiana	Active	
164	Zeta Upsilon	1965		Middletown, Indiana	Inactive	
165	Zeta Phi	196x ?		Highland, Indiana	Inactive	
1966	Zeta Chi	c. 1968		Lewisville, Indiana	Inactive	
1967	Zeta Psi	196x ?		Newburgh, Indiana	Inactive	
1968	Zeta Omega	196x ?			Inactive	
169	**Eta Alpha**	May 1, 1966		Nashville, Indiana	Active	
170	Eta Beta	196x ?			Inactive	
171	**Eta Gamma**	June 18, 1966		Valparaiso, Indiana	Active	
172	**Eta Delta**	August 20, 1966		Carmel, Indiana	Active	
173	Eta Epsilon	1966		Mishawaka, Indiana	Inactive	
174	**Eta Zeta**	May 7, 1967		Nappanee, Indiana	Active	
175	Eta Eta	1967–2022		La Porte, Indiana	Inactive	
176	Eta Theta	196x ?			Inactive	
177	**Eta Iota**	March 24, 1968		Parker City, Indiana	Active	
178	Eta Kappa	196x ?			Inactive	
179	**Eta Lambda**	June 7, 1968		Beech Grove, Indiana	Active	
180	**Eta Mu**	December 8, 1968		Rochester, Indiana	Active	
181	**Eta Nu**	January 19, 1969		Rensselaer, Indiana	Active	
182	Eta Xi	1969		Auburn, Indiana	Inactive	
183	**Eta Omicron**	April 27, 1969		Kalamazoo, Michigan	Active	
184	Eta Pi	19xx ?		Centerville and Kettering, Ohio	Inactive	
185	Eta Rho	19xx ?			Inactive	
186	Eta Sigma	May 23, 1970 – April 30, 2021		Grand Rapids, Michigan	Inactive	
186	Eta Tau	197x ?		Milroy, Indiana	Inactive	
188	Eta Upsilon	c. 1970		Hammond, Indiana	Inactive	
189	Eta Phi	1971		Terre Haute, Indiana	Inactive	
190	**Eta Chi**	January 31, 1971		Martinsville, Indiana	Active	
191	Eta Psi	197x ?		Champaign, Illinois	Inactive	
192	Eta Omega	c. 1971		Yorktown, Indiana	Inactive	
193	Theta Alpha	c. 1972–201x ?		New Palestine, Indiana	Inactive	
194	**Theta Beta**	May 2, 1971		Paoli, Indiana	Active	
195	Theta Gamma	c. 1969		Fort Branch, Indiana	Inactive	
196	**Theta Delta**	May 19, 1971		Bremen, Indiana	Active	
197	Theta Epsilon	197x ?			Inactive	
198	**Theta Zeta**	June 9, 1971		Fort Recovery, Ohio	Active	
199	Theta Eta				Inactive	
200	**Theta Theta**	September 10, 1971		Fort Wayne, Indiana	Active	
201	**Theta Iota**	October 19, 1971		Monticello, Indiana	Active	
202	**Theta Kappa**	March 5, 1972		Edon, Ohio	Active	
203	Theta Lamba	197x ?		Gaston, Indiana	Inactive	
204	Theta Mu	197x ?		Battle Creek, Michigan	Inactive	
205	**Theta Nu**	May 20, 1972		Lexington, Kentucky	Active	
206	Theta Xi	197x ?			Inactive	
207	Theta Omicron	197x ?			Inactive	
208	Theta Pi	June 5, 1972		Kenosha, Wisconsin	Inactive	
209	Theta Rho	197x ?		Franklin, Indiana	Inactive	
210	Theta Sigma	1973		North Webster, Indiana	Inactive	
211	**Theta Tau**	June 1974		Midland, Michigan	Active	
212	Theta Upsilon	197x ?			Inactive	
213	Theta Phi	197x ?		Kenosha, Wisconsin	Inactive	
214	Theta Chi	1974		Indianapolis, Indiana	Inactive	
215	**Theta Psi**	November 30, 1975		Bethany, Illinois	Active	
216	Theta Omega	197x ?		Crystal Lake, Illinois	Inactive	
217	Iota Alpha	June 11, 1978 – May 30, 2022		Veedersburg, Indiana	Inactive	
218	Iota Beta	c. 1980–20xx ?		Bryan, Ohio	Inactive	
219	Iota Gamma	198x ?			Inactive	
220	Iota Delta	198x ?		Newburgh, Indiana	Inactive	
221	Iota Epsilon	198x ?			Inactive	
222	**Iota Zeta**	January 20, 1980		Knox, Indiana	Active	
223	Iota Eta	198x ?			Inactive	
224	**Iota Theta**	December 14, 1980		Armstrong, Illinois	Active	
225	Iota Iota	198x ?			Inactive	
226	Iota Kappa	198x ?			Inactive	
227	**Iota Lambda**	June 28, 1985		Ferdinand, Indiana	Active	
228	Iota Mu	19xx ?			Inactive	
229	Iota Nu	19xx ?			Inactive	
230	**Iota Xi**	June 24, 1996		Winamac, Indiana	Active	
231	Iota Omicron			Campbellsburg, Indiana	Inactive	
232	Iota Pi				Inactive	
233	**Iota Rho**	June 29, 2003		Odon, Indiana	Active	
234	**Iota Sigma**	June 6, 2004		St. Joseph, Illinois	Active	
235	**Iota Tau**	June 15, 2006		Indianapolis, Indiana	Active	
236	**Iota Upsilon**	July 15, 2017		Virtual	Active	
237	**Iota Phi**	April 7, 2019		Clarksburg, Indiana	Active	
238	**Iota Chi**	May 2019		La Grange, Kentucky	Active	
