= Ella Scoble Opperman =

American pianist and music educator (1873–1969)

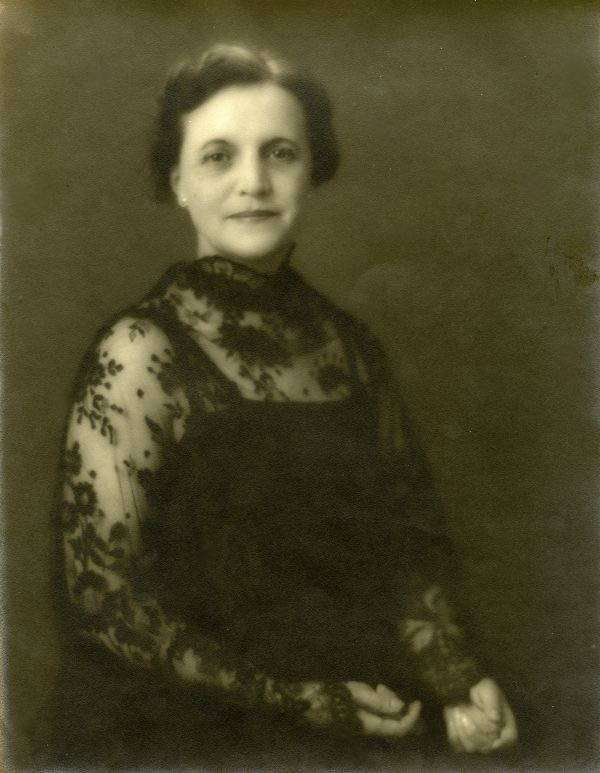
- Opperman circa 1900
- Born: October 27, 1873; New Haven, Ohio, US
- Died: March 11, 1969 (aged 95); Tallahassee, Florida, US

Ella Scoble Opperman (October 27, 1873 – March 11, 1969) was an American pianist, organist, and Dean Emeritus at the Florida State College for Women, which is now known as Florida State University. She created more music degrees and certificates, brought in more experienced faculty, and created more music majors. Opperman Music Hall at Florida State University was named after her. Marie Goth painted a picture of Opperman in the hall of the university.

== Career ==
Opperman taught at the Birmingham, Ohio Seminary for two years, Knickerbocker Hall for one year, and at Wesleyan College for five years. Edward Conradi, the president of the Florida State College for Women, asked Opperman to teach the college's music program and create a bachelor's program in 1911. During Opperman's decades as an instructor, she created more music degrees and certificates, brought in more experienced faculty, and created more music majors. In 1920, she became the college's first dean and was named Dean Emeritus. As a dean, Opperman and the faculty played recitals for their students as well as the public. In 1924, the college received a Skinner organ which Opperman performed on for the public. Opperman's Skinner organ recitals lasted for eight weeks over a summer on every Sunday and during the twilight on weekdays. Opperman was said to be "a musician of great ability, whose genius for administration was largely responsible for the growth of a small, struggling Department of Music to a thoroughly creditable School of Music" by Doak S. Campbell. On November 13, 1930, Opperman sent a letter to the National Association of Schools of Music for FCSW to become a member. The college's membership was accepted on December 30, 1930, leading to Opperman serving as Vice President of the NASM and the Ethics Committee. She was a leader in the Music Teacher’s National Association and the Florida State Music Teachers Association. The college was later renamed to Florida State University.

== Personal life ==
Opperman was born in New Haven, Ohio on October 27, 1873, to Frederick Opperman and Marcy Scoble. When Opperman was five years old, her aunt, Laura H. Scoble, taught her how to play the piano. H. Scoble taught her until Opperman attended college. At eight years old, Opperman played the piano at an opera house in Seymour, Indiana. She graduated from high school in Aurora, Indiana, and was awarded a diploma in piano and a Bachelor of Arts degree from Wesleyan College in Cincinnati, Ohio, when she was 16 years old. Opperman attended the Cincinnati Conservatory of Music from which she earned an artist diploma in piano and a Master of Music degree. From 1900 to 1901, Opperman studied the piano in Berlin and was taught by Russian pianist Ernest Jedliczka. In 1907 until 1909, Opperman was taught by composer Moritz Moszkowski and organist Felix Alexandre Guilmant. In 1909 in the United States, Opperman studied under Leopold Godowsky, Rudolph Ganz, Isador Phillip, and Guy Maier. Harold Gleason, of the Eastman School of Music, taught her the organ. In 1943, she was awarded an honorary Doctor of Pedagogy degree in 1943 for her recitals using an organ and piano in Indiana and within the Cincinnati Conservatory of Music.

Upon her retirement in 1944, Opperman was active for 25 years. While retired, she joined the Audubon society to study birds in their natural habitat. She also kept lists of birds and flowers, recipes, observations, and concerts that she attended. She also wrote the Annals of the School of Music. In 1961, the FSU Woman's Glee Club that she helped organize held a concert to honor Opperman.

== Death and accolades ==
Opperman died on March 11, 1969, in Tallahassee, Florida. Opperman Music Hall, at Florida State University, was named after her. Marie Goth painted a picture of Opperman in Opperman Music Hall. Opperman has biographies in multiple Who's Who books, Principal Women of America, American Women, and the Biographical Encyclopedia. The Tallahassee Democrat said in 2024 that "her legacy continues to entertain and draw attention to Tallahassee to this day."
