= Gianni Cilfone =

Italian-American painter

Gianni Cilfone (1908–1992) was an Italian American artist who emigrated to Chicago at the age of 5 and later studied at the Art Institute of Chicago. He studied under Hugh Breckenridge and John F. Carlson and exhibited at the Hoosier Salon, the North Shore Art Association, the Association of Chicago Painters and Sculptors, and the Art Institute of Chicago. The artist traveled the midwest giving lectures and painting demonstrations, and is remembered for his impressionistic approach to the midwest landscape.

For 30 years, he had a studio at 5 E. Ontario Street in Chicago where he taught, lectured and gave demonstrations. Later, he moved his studio to 119 Meacham Avenue in Park Ridge and continued there for 20 more years. Teaching took up most of his life from 1934 until he suffered a stroke in July 1985.

Cilfone's awards from the Municipal Art League were for landscape painting. He held many other prizes and awards, and his works are in private collections in the U.S., France, Holland, Italy and Canada. He was basically a realist but tried to put into his work the best of the modern styles.

Cilfone and his wife, Irene, went to Nashville, Indiana in the early winter of 1947, and took up quarters in the studio formerly occupied by artist Will Vawter. The Cilfones met with Curry Bohm, artist, at Gloucester, Massachusetts the last summer and were invited to visit Brown County, Indiana.

The Chicago Tribune Magazine quoted Cilfone as saying, "Nobody will think me odd for saying that Nashville, Ind. is my favorite midwestern town, but I can foresee a great many astonished looks when I go on to assert that winter is my favorite season there. Yes, I have been in Nashville at other times of year, I used to live there in fact." Several of his paintings are of Brown County scenes.
