= Paul Sargent =

Paul Sargent may refer to:

- Paul Dudley Sargent (1745–1828), privateer and soldier
- Paul Turner Sargent (1880–1946), Illinois artist
