= Ernst Jedliczka =

Ernst Jedliczka (24 May 1855 – 3 August 1904) was a Russian-German pianist, piano pedagogue, and music critic. The Encyclopædia Britannica Eleventh Edition stated that Jedliczka "did much to spread Russian music in Germany, placing Russian composers in a prominent place within his concerts and devoting them to a series of articles."

== Biography ==
Born in Poltava, Jedliczka was the son of Ukrainian composer Alois Jedliczka. In 1876 he earned diplomas in mathematics and physics from Saint Petersburg State University. He then pursued studies at the Moscow Conservatory (MC) where he was a piano student of Anton Rubinstein, Nikolai Rubinstein and Charles Klindworth. After graduating from the MC in 1879, he taught on the piano faculty of the MC from 1880-1887. He then taught at the Klindworth-Scharwenka Conservatory in Berlin from 1888–1897 and at the Stern Conservatory from 1897 until his death in 1904. His notable pupils included Charles Tomlinson Griffes, W. H. Hewlett, John J. McClellan, Ella Scoble Opperman, Arthur Nevin, Olga Samaroff, and Bruno Seidler-Winkler.

Jedlickza was a member of a notable trio in Berlin whose other members included violinist Karel Halíř and cellist Hugo Dechert. The trio notably presented the world premieres and Berlin premieres of several works by Hans Pfitzner. He also wrote music criticism for the German newspaper Allgemeine deutsche Musikzeitung for many years. He died in Berlin at the age of 49.

== Wife ==
In 1881 Jedliczka married Maria Wiedring (1865-1945), member of a Moscow German family. She studied piano at Moscow Conservatory (1877-1882). After Ernst's death she remained one of Pfitzner's close friends. She is the dedicatee of Mily Balakirev's Dumka for piano (1900).

== Sources ==
- Donna Staley Kline. An American Virtuoso on the World Stage: Olga Samaroff Stokowski, Texas A & M Univ Press, 1997, pg 28-29
