= Ada Walter Shulz =

American painter

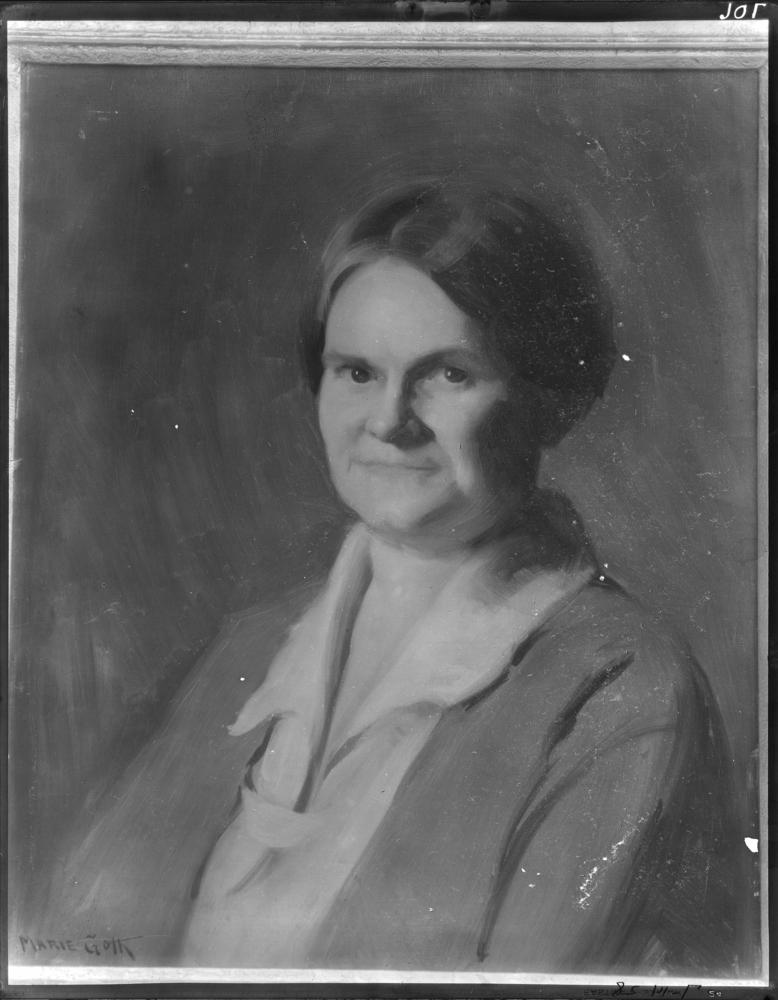
- Born: October 21, 1870; Terre Haute, Indiana, United States
- Died: May 2, 1928 (aged 57); Nashville, Indiana, US
- Known for: Painter
- Spouse: Adolph Shulz (m. 1894; div. 1926)

Ada Walter Shulz (October 21, 1870 – May 2, 1928) was an American painter, whose Impressionistic painting style primarily featured themes of mothers, children, and barnyard animals. Her paintings won awards at the Art Institute of Chicago in 1916 and 1917 and the annual Hoosier Salon exhibitions of 1926 and 1928. Her paintings were also selected for magazine covers for Woman's Home Companion (January 1920) and Literary Digest (January 17, 1925). The Terre Haute, Indiana, native studied at the Art Institute of Chicago and at the Académie Vitti in Paris, France. In 1917 she moved from her longtime home in Delavan, Wisconsin, with her artist husband, Adolph Shulz, and son Walter, to the Brown County Art Colony in Nashville, Indiana. In 1926 she became a founding member of the Brown County Art Gallery Association in Nashville. She was also a member of the Chicago chapter of the Society of Western Artists. Her paintings are held in several collections, including those at the Art Institute of Chicago, the Indianapolis Museum of Art (Newfields), the Indiana State Museum and Historic Sites, the Swope Art Museum, the Ball State University Museum of Art, the Dailey Family Memorial Collection of Hoosier Art at Indiana University, the Brown County Art Gallery and Museum, and the Art Museum of Greater Lafayette, among others.

== Early life ==
Ada Walter was born on October 21, 1870, in Terre Haute, Indiana. She was the daughter of Mary and John M. Walter, who had established a stone masonry and marble business and was also described as an architect. Ada's younger brother, Allen, was born when she was about two years old. Her father died of diphtheria in January 1873, before she was three years old. Mary Walter and her two children remained in Terre Haute until 1884, when the family moved to Indianapolis, Indiana. From 1885 until 1889 Ada attended Indianapolis High School, which was renamed Shortridge High School in 1897, and began to develop her artistic talents. Walter later credited Roda Selleck, the head of the school's art department, as the first person to inspire her interest in drawing.

After her brother's death in December 1888 and her graduation from high school in 1889, Ada and her mother moved to Chicago, Illinois. From 1889 to 1893 Ada took lessons at the Art Institute of Chicago, where her instructors included John Vanderpoel, Oliver Dennett Grover, Frederick Freer, A. Kellogg, C. Wade, and Lorado Taft. Her mother died in 1892, when Ada was twenty-one.

Ada Walter met Delavan, Wisconsin, native and fellow artist Adolph Shulz in 1892, when she summered in Delavan as an art student with Vanderpoel's class. Two weeks after their marriage in September 1894, the Shulzes sailed to Paris, where Ada studied at the Académie Vitti under Luc-Olivier Merson and Raphaël Collin. Adolph studied at Académie Julian and the Académie Colarossi.

The couple had one son, Walter, who was born on June 10, 1895. After returning to the United States later that fall, the family settled in Delavan, Wisconsin, where they remained for the next twenty years. Adolph supported the family as a landscape painter and art educator, while Ada became a full-time wife and mother. She did not paint for the next ten years.

== Career ==
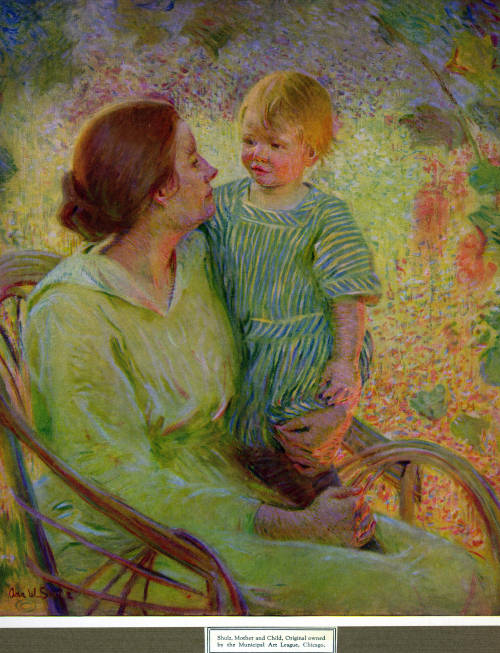
Mother and child, by Ada Walter Shulz. Original painting owned by the Municipal Art League, Chicago. Digitized by the Allen County Public Library. Shulz won a Chicago Art Piece purchase prize for this painting in 1917.

Shulz resumed painting around 1905. She also began regularly exhibiting her work at the Art Institute of Chicago and elsewhere in elsewhere in the Midwest. Shulz's painting, The Picture Book, won an Art Institute award in 1916 and her painting, Mother and Child, won a Chicago Art League purchase price in 1917. She also had paintings selected for magazine covers for Woman's Home Companion (January 1920) and Literary Digest (January 17, 1925).

The Shulz family began summering in Brown County, Indiana, in 1908, and in 1917 chose to move there permanently. Ada and Adolph Shulz built a home on land they purchased on Hoop Pole Ridge in Nashville and were members of the Brown County Art Colony. Adolph painted local landscapes while Ada focused on painting scenes of Brown County's mothers and children. She was also active in organizing the local Christian Science Society and Nashville's public library. Adolph and Ada Shulz were founding members of the Brown County Art Gallery Association in 1926. The couple were also members of the Chicago chapter of the Society of Western Artists. In addition to regularly exhibiting her work at the Brown County Art Gallery, Ada's painting were displayed at the annual Hoosier Salon art shows from 1925 through 1930. She won Hoosier Salon prizes for A Mother from the Hills in 1926 and The Pet Duck in 1928.

=== Artistic style ===
Shulz favored painting outdoors throughout her career, and was particularly receptive to the effects of light. Unlike most of the Brown County Art Colony, who were primarily landscape painters, the major themes and subject matter of her Impressionistic style were mothers, children, and barnyard animals.

== Later years ==
Ada and Adolph Shulz's son, Walter, began developing a career as an artist in Delavan, Wisconsin, prior to his enlistment and assignment to the Sixteenth Infantry, First Division, in France. Although he survived the fighting during World War I, Walter volunteered for occupation duty and died of diphtheria on December 12, 1918, after a hiking and sketching trip through the German countryside. Walter's death and grief over their loss caused the couple to grow apart. The marriage became even more strained in 1921 after Adolph became the art teacher of Alberta Rhem Miller and allowed her and her young daughter to stay at the Shulz home in Nashville. In 1924 Adolph moved into a separate cabin with Alberta. Adolph and Ada Schulz divorced on September 30, 1926. Adolph married Alberta within a month of his divorce from Ada.

After the breakup of her marriage, Shulz resumed painting and exhibiting her artwork. She also became active in the Indiana Artists Club; however, her health declined after a solo exhibition of her work was held at the Milwaukee Journal Art Gallery in March 1928. Due to her Christian Scientist faith, she refused to seek medical treatment and died two months later.

== Death and legacy ==
Shulz died in Nashville, the county seat of Brown County, on May 2, 1928, at the age of fifty-eight. The cause of her death is unknown, but is believed to have been cancer.

Shulz was a founding member of the Brown County Gallery Association and a member of the Society of Western Artists. Her work, primarily of people in rural settings, especially mothers and children, is held in many collections, including those of the Art Institute of Chicago; Haan Mansion Museum of Indiana Art; the Indianapolis Museum of Art; the Indiana State Museum and Historic Sites; the Ball State University Museum of Art; the Dailey Family Memorial Collection of Hoosier Art at Indiana University; the Brown County Art Gallery and Museum; and the Art Museum of Greater Lafayette.
