= William McKendree Snyder =

American artist (1848–1930)

- Born: William McKendree Snyder; December 20, 1848; Liberty, Indiana
- Died: September 1930 (aged 81); Indiana
- Education: Hudson River School
- Known for: Painter

William McKendree Snyder (December 20, 1848 – September 30, 1930) was an American painter active in Indiana in the late 19th and early 20th centuries best known for detailed Indiana landscapes. He was one of the first artists to paint in Brown County, Indiana, making him a forerunner of the Brown County Art Colony.

He was born in Liberty, Indiana, to a prominent Methodist minister, William W. Snyder. The family later moved to Madison, Indiana, and it was there that Snyder is best known for his landscape paintings of southern Indiana Beech trees, though he was also known to paint portraits, still lifes, and other subjects. heavily influenced by the Hudson River School, Snyder studied with some of America's most important artists of the day, including Albert Bierstadt, Charles Warren Eaton, William Morris Hunt, and George Inness. Snyder's work is highly sought after today and is held in numerous public and private collections, including the Indiana State Museum and Hanover College.

In 1861, both father and son joined the Union Army for the American Civil War, as a chaplain and a drummer boy, respectively. The teen was captured and imprisoned in the notorious Andersonville Prison.
