= Brown County Art Colony =

The Brown County Art Colony is an artist colony formed in Nashville and Brown County, Indiana.

Adolph Shulz is considered to be the founder of the colony, encouraging many Indiana and regional artists to come to Brown County to paint. Though artists such as William McKendree Snyder had been coming to Brown County as early as 1870, the colony is considered to have been firmly established in 1907 when the noted painter T. C. Steele moved there. The dean of Indiana painters, Steele built a home and studio on a large plot of land west of Nashville near Belmont and made it his permanent home. Its proximity to Indiana University in Bloomington allowed Steele to accept a position as artist in residence there in 1922.

An art association was incorporated in 1926 with Carl Graf as the first president. In 1954, the association split into two organizations: The Brown County Art Gallery and Museum and The Brown County Art Guild. Both organizations continue to maintain galleries in Nashville in which art created by the early artists is displayed along with the art of contemporary members which is for sale.

Some of the noted Brown County artists include:

- Adam Emory Albright
- Patty Bartels
- Gustave Baumann
- Olive Beem
- Dale Bessire
- C. Curry Bohm
- Anthony Buchta
- V. J. Cariani
- Dale Cassiday
- C. Carey Cloud
- Evelynne Mess Daily
- Alexis J. Fournier
- Edwin Fulwider
- Marie Goth
- Carl Graf
- Genevieve Goth Graf
- Louis Oscar Griffith
- John Hafen
- Glen Cooper Henshaw
- Georges LaChance
- Leota Loop
- Karl Martz (potter)
- Adrian J. Miller
- Chelsea Noggle
- Robert Marshall Root
- Paul Turner Sargent
- Ada Walter Shulz
- Adolph Shulz
- T. C. Steele
- Will Vawter
- Frederick W. Rigley
- William Zimmerman
