= Paul Turner Sargent =

American painter

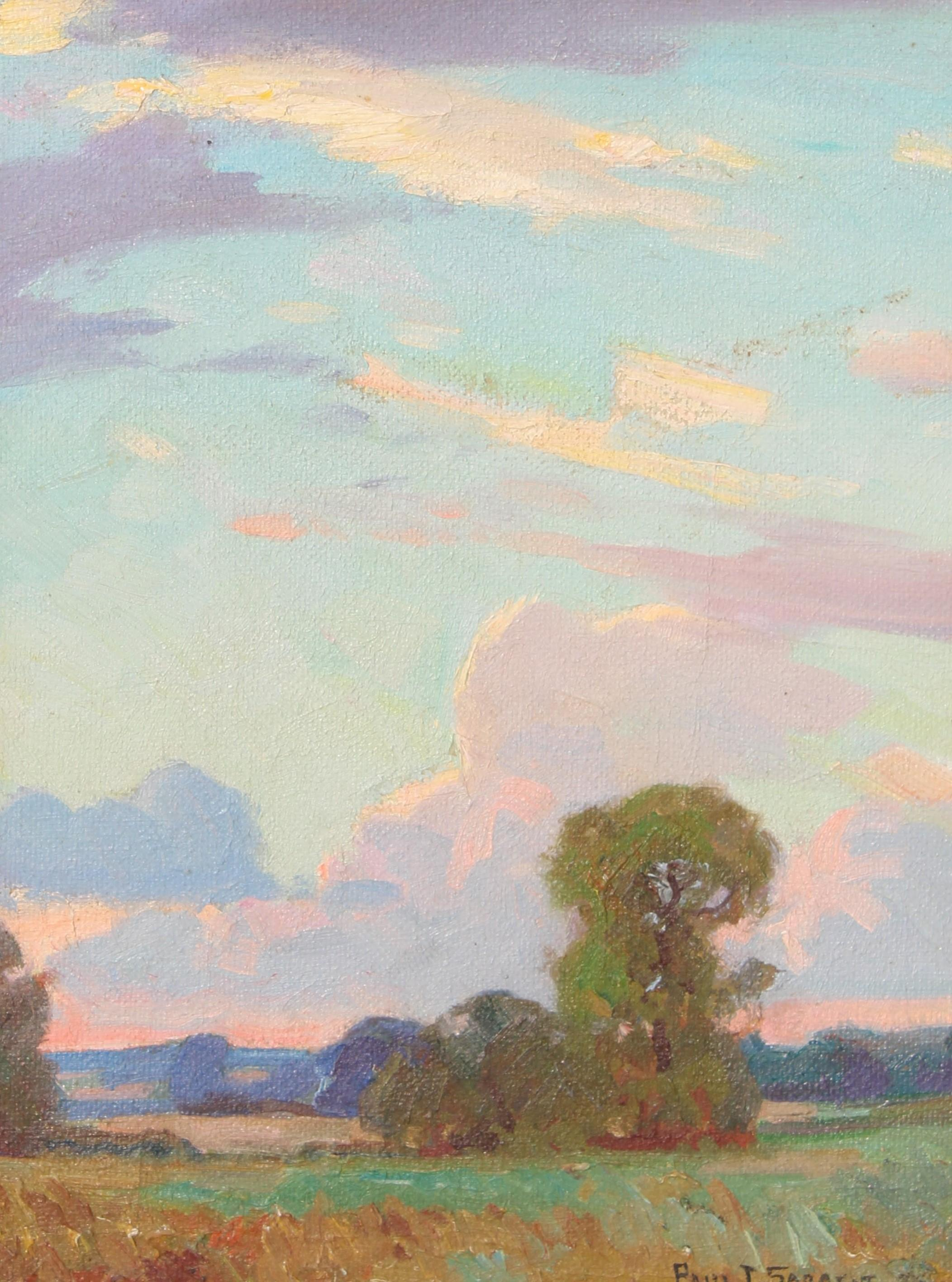
Vertical Big Sky Indiana Landscape by Paul Turner Sargent

Paul Turner Sargent (July 23, 1880 – February 7, 1946) was an Illinois artist, known for his Illinois landscapes and various other images from his trips to California, Indianapolis, and Florida. Throughout his career, he was a true outdoorsman who used nature as his canvas and muse for most of his works. As told by his brother, Sam Sargent, he painted from "real scenes in nature." In his lifetime, he painted some seven-thousand sketches and canvases.

== Early life ==
Before his birth in 1880, his grandfather Stephen Sargent was an early settler to Coles County, Illinois. Paul's father, John Sargent, was born in the house that Stephen had built when he had moved to Illinois and both men were involved in Illinois agriculture. The house and its surrounding landscape are common images seen in Paul Sargent's paintings, which represent his passion for his family and Illinois nature.

Born on the family farm in Hutton Township, Coles County, Illinois, John and Maria Anna Turner Sargent welcomed their seventh child, Paul Turner Sargent. As a young child, his schoolteacher, John M. Harlow, who observed his talent as he sketched famous works of art during classes, influenced him. Another influence was his older sister Pearl, who loaned him her oils to paint for amusement during recovery of an injury from jumping from a hayloft on the Sargent farm. From the county school, he went to the Eastern Illinois State Normal School (which is now Eastern Illinois University), where he continued to study art and graduated in 1906. His brother, Sam Sargent, wrote in an unpublished biography of his brother, Paul, that although their mother was concerned with the farm, she wanted to make sure that her children received an education in whatever they wanted. From there, he went to the Art Institute of Chicago, where he was inspired to work with large canvases. Research has found that Sargent painted a few murals around the city of Chicago, including genre scenes of the George Rogers Clark crossing into Illinois at the John M. Smyth school, a second at the Crippled Children's House of a scene from Robin Hood, and the third at Sherman Park Field House of Captain John Smith landing at Jamestown with colonists.

== Brown County Artist ==
After coming back to Hutton Township from Chicago, he began to travel for inspiration and find new galleries for his artwork. In 1920, he met Adolph Shulz in Brown County, Indiana, where he joined the well-established Brown County Art Colony. The colony was created in the 1900s for artists who were passionate about scenic landscapes and distinctive qualities of Indiana.

One of his best known works as a Brown County Artist was “Water Boy,” which was a scene of a boy sitting in the shade of a shock of grain in the field. The reproductive rights were bought by Marshall Field and Company to use in a calendar. He also received the Frederick Nelson Vance prize given by the Brown County Galleries Association for the best picture of the year in 1934.

The Brown County artists began to dissipate around the 1940s when other trends in painting began to take over the art world.

== Artist and Teacher ==
In 1930 Sargent returned to his alma mater, now named Eastern Illinois State Teacher's College, to teach private art classes to interested students. From 1938 to 1942 he taught landscape painting at the college through extensions courses. Among his students was Ralph Wickiser, a teacher and administrator at Pratt Institute, and Alice Baber, a painter in the Color Field school of Abstract expressionism.

Aside from teaching at the Eastern Illinois State Teacher's College and working on his own career, he took pleasure in private tutoring for student artists. Sargent taught his students many different lessons, from how to keep pigments from stiffening when outdoors in the cold to broad principles of picture making as fundamental to good representation and composition.

Sargent had a flair for landscapes, a passion for the land and nature. His roads and streams are humble, peaceful glances of a place that Sargent once knew in Coles County. Landscape art played a significant role in American art. The earliest landscape paintings were topographic illustrations and then became backgrounds to portraits. Sam discusses his older brother's enthusiasm for the landscape, "His school was all outdoors, nature in the raw….He wanted his scenes to be of nature as she grew without man's help. His trees must be as they grew out in the open and not pampered by man." Sargent resisted modern movements, such as Cubism and abstract art, because as can be seen by his work, he was about the realism of a painting. He believed that in painting nature, a still life or from a model in portrait work, one could learn as much in one lesson as he could in a dozen at copy work. Later on, his work became less representative of nature and his pieces began to take on a more Impressionism style of art.

== Works of Arts ==
Listed below are the three main categories in which Paul Sargent painted; landscapes, portraits and still life. All listed paintings come from the Tarble Arts Center's collection of Sargent paintings at Eastern Illinois University in Charleston, Illinois.

Landscape

- Across the Valley (1945)
- Afternoon Showers (1942)
- Birch Tree (1927)
- Cloud Shadows (1942)
- Embarras Valley (1921)
- Florida Palms (1928)
- The Harvesters (Series: The Binder) (1918)
- Hidden Valley (Not Dated)
- A Hint of Spring (1938)
- Indian Lookout (1941)
- In the Heat of the Day (Sheep in the Summer) (Not Dated)
- Mountain Stream (Sequoia Park) (1937)
- The Old Bridge (Bridge on the Embarras River) (1939)
- The Old Swimming Hole (1939)
- Paradise Lake (1945)
- Parkinson's Woods (1932)
- Red Oaks (1922)
- Reflections (1943)
- The River in Winter (Snow Scene) (1945)
- Road in the Desert (1935)
- Road to Crowber's Farm (1942)
- Seascape (Not Dated)
- Spring on the Farm (1945)
- Springtime in Southern Illinois (1945)
- Springtime Reflections (1945)
- A Sunny Hillside (1923)
- Sunset in Florida (Florida Sunset) (1934)
- Threshing (Binding Grain or The Binder) (1922)
- Title Unknown (1938)
- Trees (with Fence) (Not Dated)
- Under the Elm Tree (1917)
- Unknown (Fall Landscape) (1940)
- Untitled (Cabin in Winter) (1927)
- Untitled (Clouds) (1937)
- Untitled (Fall Landscape) (Not Dated)
- Untitled (Fall Landscape) (1940)
- Untitled (Fall Landscape) (1945) *Untitled (Fall Scene) (1944)
- Untitled (Landscape) (Not Dated)
- Untitled (Landscape Near Riverside California) (1923)
- Untitled (Ocean Scene) (Not Dated)
- Untitled (Outdoor Scene with Building) (Not Dated)
- Untitled (River in Winter) (1935)
- Untitled (Sheep Grazing) (1936)
- Untitled (Summer Landscape Study) (Not Dated)
- Untitled (Summer Landscape with Sheep and Lamb) (Not Dated)
- Untitled (Yellow Oak) (1943)

Portrait

- Portrait of Mrs. Osa McMorris Malcom(Not Dated)
- Portrait of a Young Man (1922)
- Uncle Archibald (Not Dated)

Still Life

- Vase of Flowers (Not Dated)
- Vase of Zinnias (1945)
