= Riverlawn =

Historic house in Virginia, United States

- U.S. National Register of Historic Places
- Virginia Landmarks Register
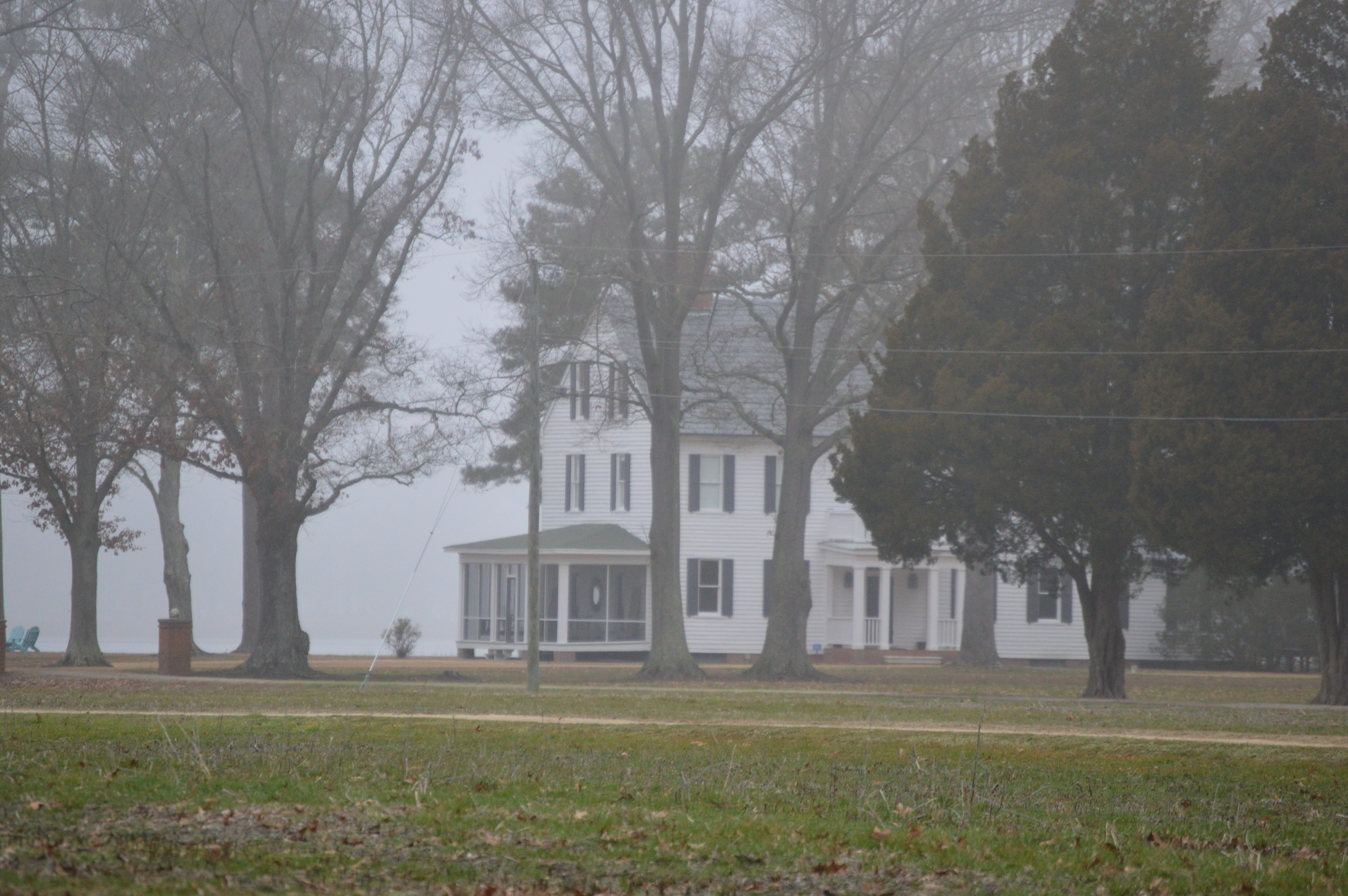
- Roadside view of the house

- Location within Virginia Location within the United States
- Location: 134 Williamsdale Lane, near Mathews, Virginia
- Coordinates: 37°24′30″N 76°20′16″W
- Area: 9.7 acres (3.9 ha)
- Built: 1874, 1929
- Built by: Heron Murray; J.J. Burke
- Architectural style: vernacular Federal
- NRHP reference No.: 12000543
- VLR No.: 057-0036

Significant dates
- Added to NRHP: August 22, 2012
- Designated VLR: June 21, 2012

Riverlawn, also known as the Cordelia Murray House and Zacharias home, is a historic home located near Mathews, Mathews County, Virginia. It was built in 1874, and is a 2 1/2-story, frame dwelling in a vernacular Federal style. The house has a four-over-four, central hall floor plan. Additions were made and it was renovated in 1929. Also on the property are a contributing well, stone well and a pair of contributing brick gateposts.

It was listed on the National Register of Historic Places in 2012 after the home was sold by the Zacharias Family.
