= Marie Goth =

American painter (1887–1975)

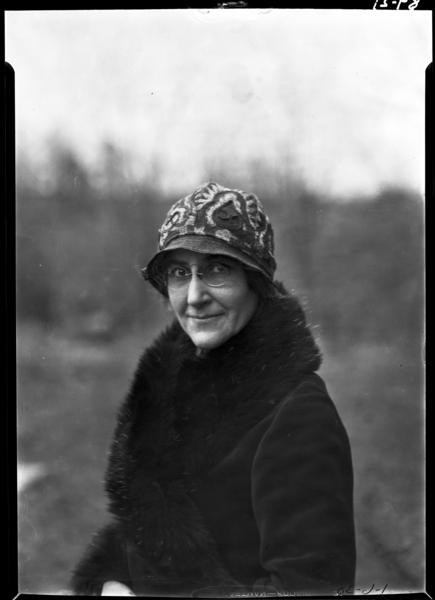
- Goth in 1930
- Born: Jessie Marie Goth; August 15, 1887; Indianapolis, Indiana, US
- Died: January 9, 1975 (aged 87); Nashville, Indiana, US
- Education: Art Students League of New York (1909–19); John Herron Art Institute, Indianapolis (1906–07)
- Known for: Portrait painting

Jessie Marie Goth (August 15, 1887 - January 9, 1975) was an American painter from Indianapolis, Indiana. Best known for her portraiture, Goth was the first woman to paint an official portrait of an Indiana governor (Henry F. Schricker) that was installed in the Indiana Statehouse. Goth became a full-time resident of Nashville, Indiana in the 1920s and was active in its Brown County Art Colony. She became a charter member and former president of the Brown County Art Gallery Association in 1926 and a cofounder of the Brown County Art Guild in 1954. Goth died from injuries sustained in a fall at her home in 1975.

Goth's portraits have featured several Hoosier notables, including James Whitcomb Riley, John T. McCutcheon, Paul V. McNutt, and Will H. Hays, as well as fellow artists, family members, and neighbors in Brown County. Her work is represented in the collections of more than a dozen of Indiana's public art galleries, museums, and educational institutions. She also exhibited her art at every Hoosier Salon from 1925 to 1975, and in other art exhibitions across Indiana, in New York City, and elsewhere in the United States. Goth willed the bulk of her estate to the Brown County Art Guild to establish and maintain a local art museum in Nashville, Indiana.

== Early life and education ==
Jessie Marie Goth, the eldest daughter of Jessie and Charles Goth, was born on August 15, 1887, in Indianapolis, Marion County, Indiana. Both of Goth's parents were musicians. Her mother was a vocalist, while her father played bass violin with the Indianapolis Symphony Orchestra and was co-owner of the Crown Monument Company, a successful monument business in Indianapolis. Although her family's tendencies leaned toward the musical arts and Marie received musical training from her parents, she was drawn to the visual arts and became interested in art at an early age. Goth and won her first art prize at the age of sixteen in a citywide design contest.

Goth and her younger sister, Genevieve (1890–1961), a former Indianapolis schoolteacher who also became a painter, maintained a close relationship throughout their lives. Genevieve married Carl Graf (1892–1947), a Brown County, Indiana, artist in 1928.

Marie grew up in Indianapolis, where she attended a local elementary school and graduated from Manual Training High School about 1906. Otto Stark, her father's cousin, was head of the art department and a member of the Hoosier Group of American Impressionist painters. Stark may have had an early influence on her decision to pursue a career as an artist. After graduation from high school, Goth worked as an assistant art instructor at the high school for three years. In 1906–07 she took art classes at the city's John Herron Art Institute. Goth also studied at the Art Academy of Cincinnati while spending a summer with relatives.

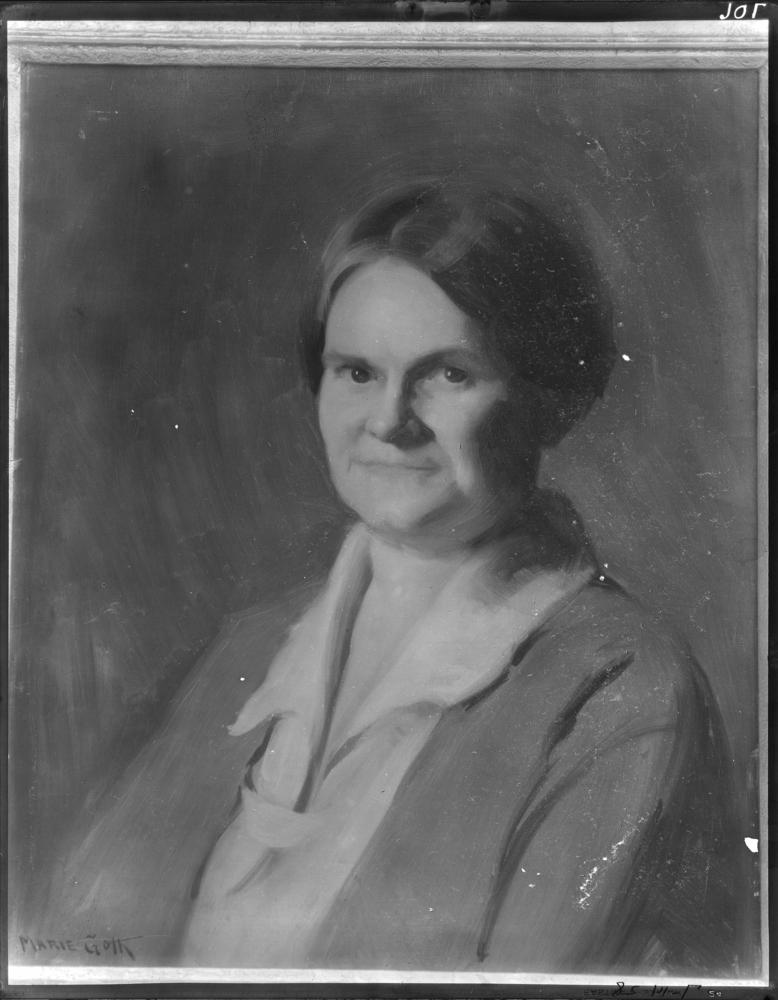
Portrait of artist Ada Walter Shulz by Marie Goth, 1928.

Goth applied for and received a scholarship to attend the Art Students League of New York in 1909. With additional scholarships, part-time employment, and financial support from her sister, Goth continued her studies at the Art Students League for ten years. During her stay in New York City, Goth boarded at the Three Arts Club, a residence on West Fifty-eight Street that catered to women pursuing the arts. Goth initially intended to become an illustrator, but switched to portraiture after studying with Frank DuMond, her instructor and mentor. DuMond helped influenced Goth's portraits, which broke new ground for women artists. Instead of focusing on portraits of children, which was the typical path for women portrait painters of that era, Goth made her career painting portraits of adults. In addition to DuMond, Goth also studied under the direction of William Merritt Chase, Robert Aiken, George Bridgman, and F. Luis Mora while she was living in New York.

While Goth was a student at the Art League, she met Varaldo Giuseppe Cariani (1891–1966), also known as V. J. Cariani, an Italian-born landscape and still-life painter who was a classmate at the school. The couple's friendship developed into a lifelong relationship, although they never married. The specific reasons for their decision to remain unwed are unknown, but some sources suggested that it may have been due to religious differences. Cariani was a devout Catholic, while Goth was raised as a Christian Scientist.

Goth returned to Indianapolis in 1919 to begin her career as a portrait painter; Cariani left the Art League in 1917 to enlist in the military. During World War I he served in the American Expeditionary Forces, Twenty-eighth Infantry Division, 103rd Trench Mortar Battery. Cariani suffered from shell shock as a result of his wartime experience and had trouble reacclimating to daily life. Hoping to restore his health after his return to the United States, Goth's father offered Cariani a job as a stone carver at the monument company he co-owned in Indianapolis, and Genevieve purchased one of his sketches to fund his travel to Indianapolis.

== Career ==
After completing her art training in New York, Goth returned to Indiana in 1919 and set up a studio in the living room of her parents' Indianapolis home, where she earned a living as a portrait painter. In the early 1920s, after a fellow artist invited Goth on a painting trip to Brown County, Indiana, she fell in love with southern Indiana. In 1922 Marie and her sister, Genevieve, purchased a cabin in the Peaceful Valley, north of Nashville in Brown County to use as the family's summer home. When they took possession of the property in the summer of 1923, Cariani helped the two sisters move into the cabin, which the sisters decorated and added furniture made by their father. Cariani remained at the cabin to paint after the sisters returned to the Goth residence and Marie's portrait studio in Indianapolis. The sisters returned to Brown County to visit on weekends. When her mother's health declined, Marie decided to move her studio out of the family's Indianapolis home and established her permanent residence in Brown County, where the original cabin was torn down and replaced with a new one. Goth and Cariani lived a discreet and unconventional life together in Brown County. To protect her reputation, Cariani moved out of Goth's cabin and built a nearby studio on the property.

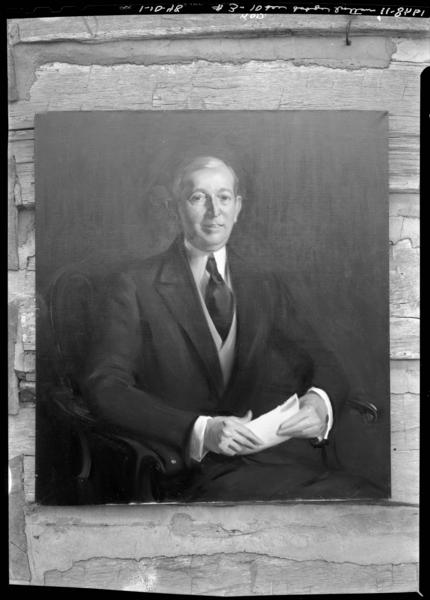
Portrait of William H. Hays by Marie Goth, circa 1948, photo courtesy of Indiana University Lilly Library

Goth, who is known for her portraiture, painted the likenesses of numerous Hoosier notables, prominent businessmen, and dignitaries during her long career. Her subjects included poet James Whitcomb Riley, Pulitzer Prize– winning cartoonist John T. McCutcheon, Paul V. McNutt (who became governor of Indiana), Indianapolis Symphony Orchestra conductors Fabien Sevitsky and Izler Solomon, U.S. Army general Douglas MacArthur, and Will H. Hays, a former president of the Motion Picture Producers and Distributors of America, among others. Goth also painted her Brown County neighbors and fellow artists. Among Goth's most significant works was her portrait of Indiana governor Henry F. Schricker. It became the first official governor's portrait by a woman to hang in the Indiana Statehouse.

Goth contributed numerous works to art exhibitions. Within Indiana she exhibited her work at Nashville's Brown County Art Gallery and Brown County Art Guild; Evansville's Museum of Arts, History and Science; the Fort Wayne Art Association; Indianapolis's John Herron Art Institute; several Indiana Art Club exhibitions; and Terre Haute's Swope Art Museum, among many others. She also exhibited at every Hoosier Salon from its debut in Chicago in 1925 to 1975, the year of her death, and received many of its awards. In addition, Goth's paintings were recognized in exhibitions at several Indiana colleges and universities, including Ball State University, Franklin College, and Indiana University. Goth's work was seen outside of Indiana at the National Association of Women Painters and Sculptors Exhibitions in New York, the National Academy of Design Annual Exhibition in New York, as well as the Brooklyn Museum, the Cincinnati Art Museum, and the Speed Art Museum in Louisville, Kentucky.

In 1926 Goth became a charter member of the Brown County Art Gallery Association and served for two years as its first president. After the group split into two organizations, Goth became a cofounder of the Brown County Art Guild in 1954.

== Later years ==
Goth maintained her home in Brown County, Indiana, from 1923 to 1975, even after she suffered the loss of her family members, including her brother-in-law, Carl Graf, in 1947, her sister, Genevieve, in 1961, and close friend and companion, Cariani, in 1969. (After Cariani's death, Goth left his studio untouched.) Goth continued to paint and exhibit her work to the end of her life. At the age of eighty-seven, Goth entered two paintings in the Hoosier Salon's fifty-first exhibition, which was held in January 1975. Goth died the week before the Salon's opening gala. Neighbor, one of her Salon submissions, was posthumously awarded its Jury Prize of Distinction.

== Death and legacy ==
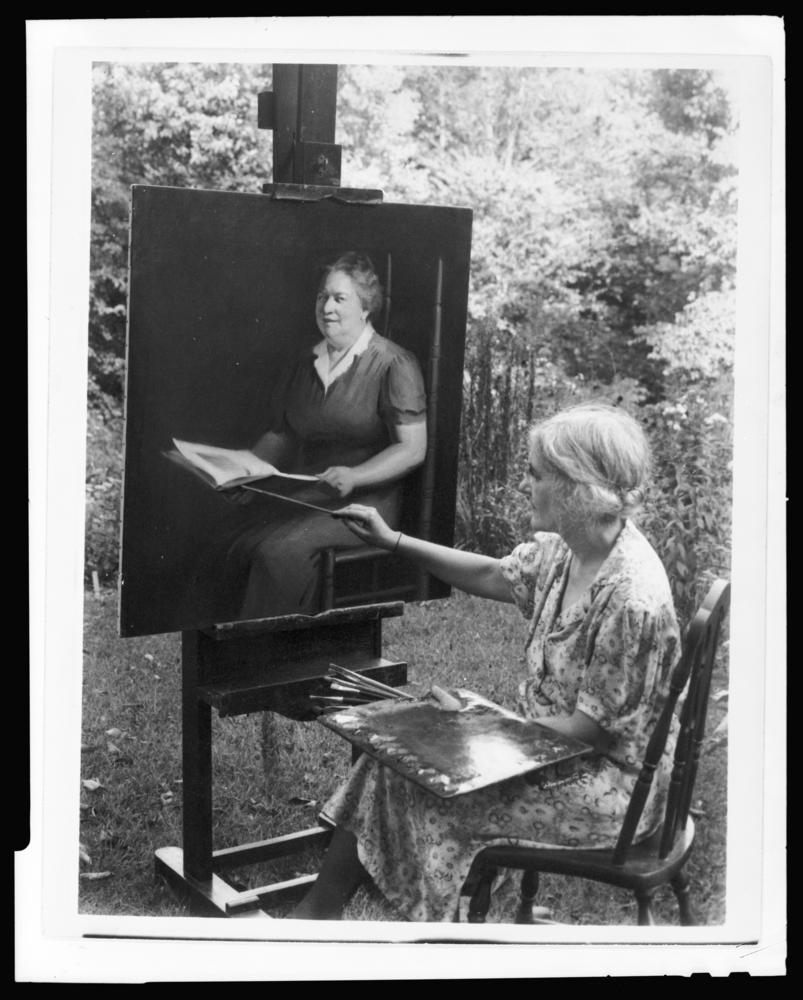
Marie Goth painting, unknown date, photo courtesy of Indiana University Lilly Library

Goth died at her cabin in Nashville, Indiana, on January 9, 1975, from head injuries and several bone fractures suffered in a fall. Goth's remains are interred at the Brown County Memorial Park, a cemetery in Nashville, Indiana, beside Cariani's.

Goth is best known for her portraiture. She was the first woman commissioned to paint an official portrait of an Indiana governor. The portrait of Indiana governor Henry F. Schricker, which was accepted for inclusion in the Indiana Governors' Portrait Collection in 1943, hangs in the Indiana State Treasurer's office (Room 242) in the Indiana Statehouse.

Goth willed the bulk of her estate, valued at more than $600,000, including her property and collection of 2,000 paintings by Goth, Cariani, and Genevieve and Carl Graf, to the Brown County Art Guild, along with funds to establish and maintain a local art museum to house her collection, and to display the work of the founding members, as well as contemporary artists.

== Honors and tributes ==
Throughout her long career, Goth received numerous prizes for her art, including awards from the National Academy of Design, the Hoosier Salon, and the Indiana State Fair, as well as the Brown County Art Gallery, Fort Wayne Art Museum, and Indiana Artists Club, among others. Goth also received a special recognition from the Hoosier Salon in 1974 for her continuous participation as an exhibitor since its first exhibition in 1925. Goth was posthumously elected to the Indiana Academy in 1977.

== Selected works ==
- Charles W. Dalgreen
- Florence
- General Robert H. Tyndall
- Henry F. Schricker
- Joel W. Hadley
- Neighbor
- Portrait of John T. McCutcheon

== Public collections ==
Goth's work is represented in the collections of several of Indiana's public art galleries, museums, and educational institutions, as well as private collections.

- Indiana State Museum and Historic Sites, Indianapolis, Indiana
- Art Museum of Greater Lafayette, Lafayette, Indiana
- Brown County Art Gallery, Nashville, Indiana
- Brown County Art Guild, Nashville
- Butler University, Indianapolis
- DePauw University, Greencastle, Indiana
- Earlham College, Richmond, Indiana
- Franklin College, Franklin, Indiana
- Hanover College, Hanover, Indiana
- Herron Art Institute, Indianapolis
- Indiana Statehouse, Indianapolis
- Indiana University, Bloomington, Indiana
- Purdue University, West Lafayette, Indiana
- Swope Art Museum, Terre Haute, Indiana
