= Gaar Williams =

American cartoonist

Gaar Campbell Williams (December 12, 1880 - June 15, 1935) was a prominent American cartoonist who worked for the Indianapolis News and the Chicago Tribune. His scenes of horse and buggy days in small towns of the Victorian era included situations taken from memories of his childhood in his hometown of Richmond, Indiana. Labeled the "Hoosier Cartoonist" or the "James Whitcomb Riley of the Pencil", his cartoon panels captured the flavor of a bygone era to the degree they were deemed worthy of reprinting in the mid-20th century years after his death.

He drew his first cartoons for publication while he was the staff artist for the Richmond High School magazine, Argus. After studies at Cincinnati Art Academy and the Chicago Art Institute, Williams began cartooning in 1904 for the Chicago Daily News, where he stayed for three years. He joined the Indianapolis News in 1909. In Indianapolis, where he had a growing reputation as a designer of book plates, he married Magdalena "Lena" Engelbert, a graduate of Earlham College in his hometown.

His well-known drawings include The End of a Perfect Day, depicting the American doughboy returning from World War I, and Long Boy, published on the William Herschell song sheet. After illustrating Keeping Up with William (Bobbs-Merrill, 1918) by Irving Bacheller, he illustrated Ring Lardner's The Young Immigrunts (Bobbs-Merrill, 1920). In 1921, Williams moved to the Chicago Tribune, where he stayed for the next 14 years.

== Portfolios ==
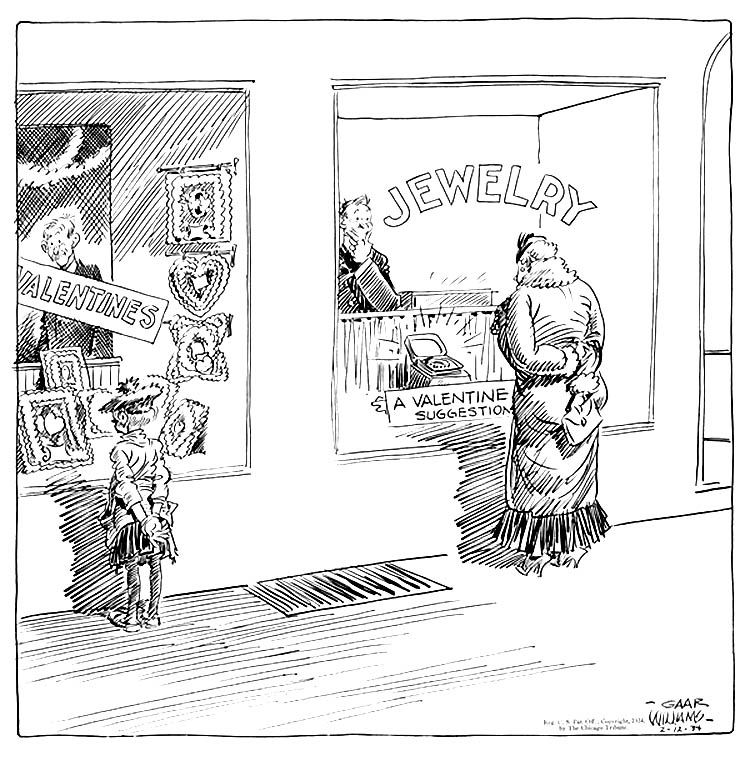
Gaar Williams' cartoon (February 12, 1934)

The Tribune reprinted his work in at least a dozen portfolios: Zipper (1935) reprinted 25 of his 1932–34 cartoons about the dog Zipper. Hunting and Fishing (1935) reprinted 30 of his cartoons from 1927–1934. Others were Among the Folks in History (four portfolios), Mort Green and Wife, Our Secret Ambition, Something Ought to be Done About This, Static, A Strain on the Family Tie and Wotta Life! Wotta Life!

By the time of his death in 1935, his cartoons were being published in 39 newspapers. He was buried at Earlham Cemetery in Richmond, Indiana.

== Books ==
Some of his political cartoons were reprinted in George Hecht's The War in Cartoons: A History of the War in 100 Cartoons by 27 of the Most Prominent American Cartoonists (Dutton, 1919). One of his cartoon features, Among the Folks in History, was collected as a book published by the Book and Print Guild in 1935 and reprinted by Rand McNally in 1947, followed by How to Keep from Growing Old (Rand McNally, 1948) with an introduction by Franklin P. Adams.
