= Nancy Noel =

American artist

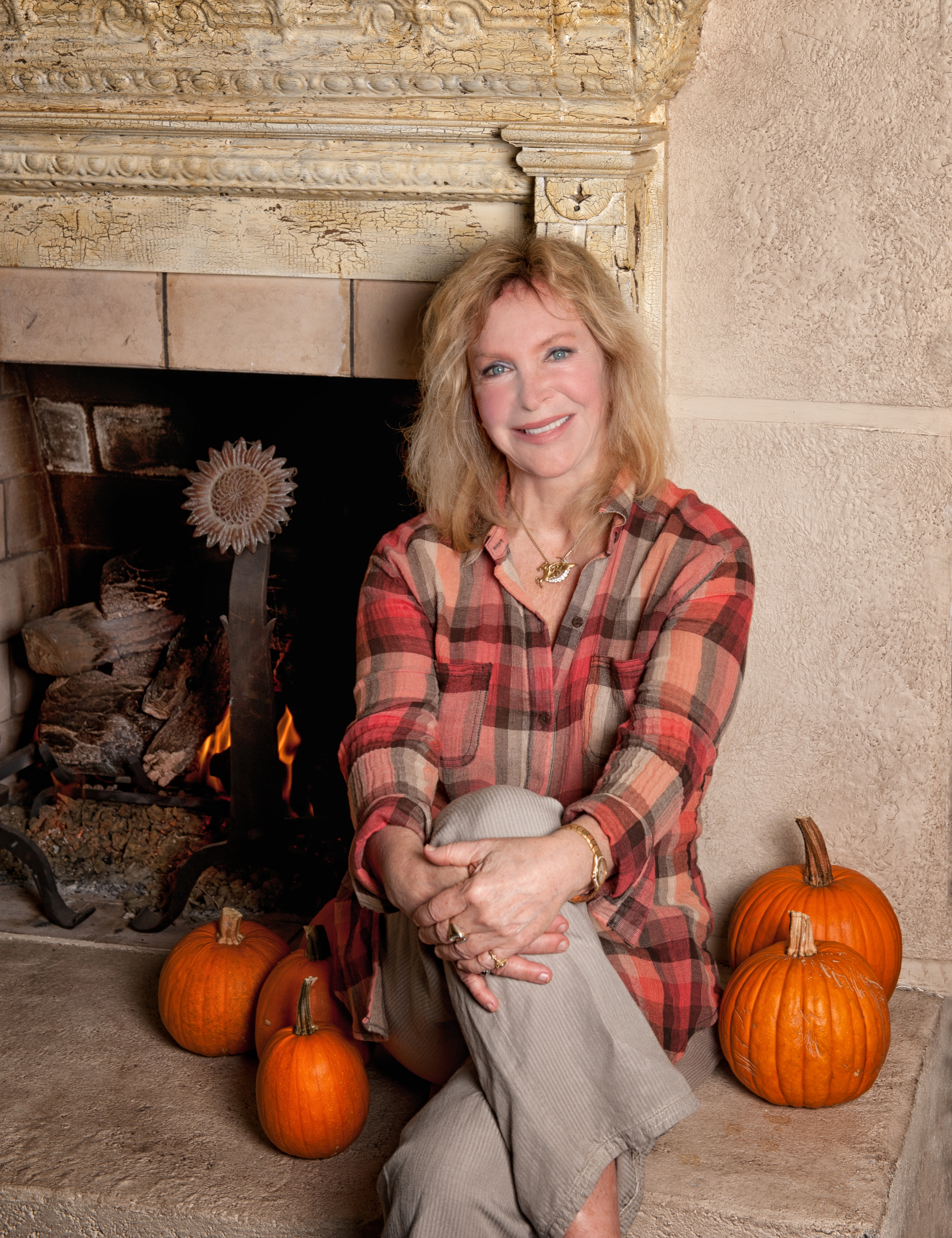
- At her gallery in Zionsville
- Born: October 29, 1945; Indianapolis, Indiana
- Died: August 16, 2020 (aged 74); Zionsville, Indiana
- Occupation: Artist

Nancy Noel (October 29, 1945 – August 16, 2020) was an American artist based in Zionsville, Indiana.

== Early life ==
Noel was a native of Indianapolis, Indiana, attending Immaculate Heart of Mary Catholic School in the Meridian-Kessler neighborhood on the north side of Indianapolis. As a child, Noel struggled in school with undiagnosed dyslexia, which was only identified in her 40s. She attended Saint Mary's College of Notre Dame, and earned her bachelor's degree in fine arts degree from the College of Mount St. Joseph in Cincinnati in 1967.

== Career ==
In 1971, she opened her first art gallery, Noel Gallery, in the Broad Ripple neighborhood of Indianapolis. She looked for a publisher to make prints of her work at that time. Unable to find one, Noel started publishing her prints herself. When first starting out in her art career, she went by the name N.A. Noel, without her first name, in order to be taken seriously as a woman in the art world, only later being known as Nancy Noel.

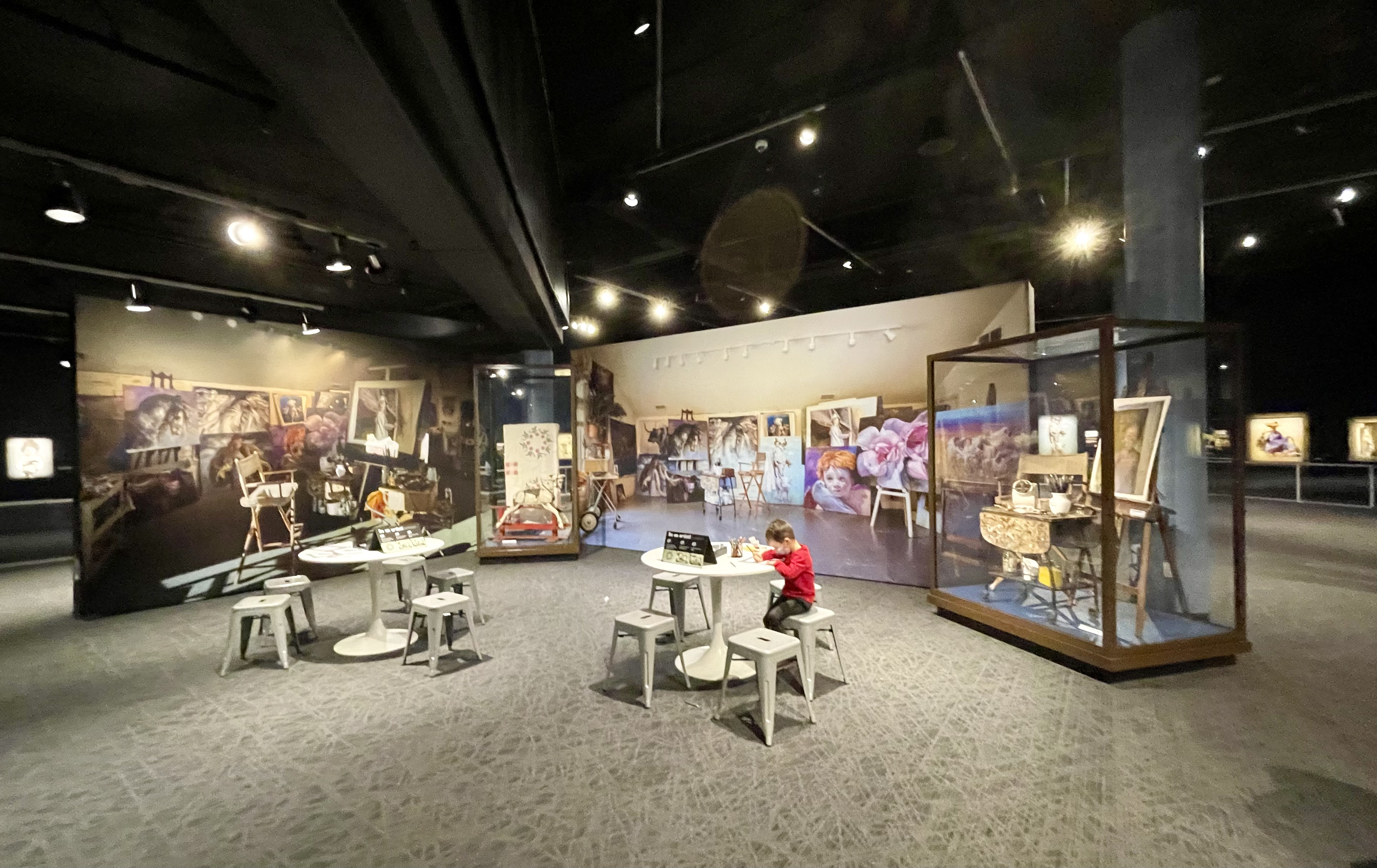
The Paintings of N.A. Noël, an exhibition of Noel's artwork at The Children's Museum of Indianapolis, where her studio was recreated as an interactive element for children

Throughout her career, Noel painted more children and animals than adults. Her style has been described as Americana and whimsical, with many of her paintings depicting the "innocence of youth" and angelic figures. She often painted both African subjects of the Maasai people and members of the American Amish community. Though she was mainly a commercial artist, her work "The Matriarch" was exhibited at the National Museum of Women in the Arts.

Noel had a close relationship with her hometown children's museum, The Children's Museum of Indianapolis. She produced art for museum posters and painted several objects from the institution's collections. A Noel artwork has been displayed in the museum's Broad Ripple Park Carousel gallery for several years. After her death in 2020, the museum worked together with her children to create an exhibition, The Paintings of N.A. Noël, which ran from November 13, 2021, to January 9, 2022. The exhibit included more than 40 of Noel's artworks, alongside several of the original collections objects depicted in her work, and a recreation of her artist's studio, with interactive stations for children to produce their own art.

In her lifetime, Noel painted over 1,000 original works. She published 8 books, and sold millions of prints of her works. Her works have been collected by many notable owners, such as Mikhail Gorbachev and Oprah Winfrey. Throughout the 1990s, Noel's prints had more sales in the United States than Pablo Picasso. She became one of the first commercial artists to take out magazine ads for her works.

In 2005, Noel purchased an old Victorian church on Main Street in Zionsville, and renovated it into an art gallery that holds her full collection of work, which she called The Sanctuary. In 2015, Noel put The Sanctuary up for sale, and began considering moving gallery operations to Aspen, Colorado or New York City.

== Personal life ==
Noel and former husband, real estate developer Gerald Kosene, had two sons, Michael and filmmaker Alex Kosene. For many years, Noel operated an animal farm at her home in Zionsville, Indiana, where she raised many animals, including horses and llamas, which were often subjects of her works. She and her fiancé, painter and former marine George Mast, hosted events at the farm for children and adults with special needs.

Noel died of cancer at the age of 74 on August 16, 2020. Noel's sons, with her friend and business manager Kathy Pierle, keep her studio and philanthropy interests active.

== Philanthropic work ==
Nancy Noel was a philanthropist. She sponsored a preschool in Inbuto, Kenya that is named after her.
