= Frank V. Dudley =

American painter (1868–1957)

Frank Virgil Dudley
- Born: November 14, 1868; Delavan, Wisconsin, US
- Died: March 5, 1957 (aged 88); Chicago, Illinois, US
- Education: Art Institute of Chicago
- Known for: Landscape Painting,

Frank V. Dudley (November 14, 1868 – March 5, 1957) was an American landscape painter, known especially for his paintings of scenes in the Indiana Dunes.

Dudley was born in Delavan, Wisconsin, but he spent most of his life in the Chicago area. His studio was located in what is now the Indiana Dunes State Park. Not only did he frequently paint the dunes, he was a significant figure in dunes conservation, helping to successfully advocate for the formation of a park to preserve the Indiana lake shore. He won the Logan Medal of the arts

Born of deaf parents on November 14, 1868, he was the eldest of three brothers. In 1887, he left Delavan, Wisconsin to study art in Chicago. He married Haley Boxwell, and a son, Paul (1898) was born several years later. To support his family, he took commissions to color portrait photographs in crayon and watercolor. His first exhibition was in 1902 at the Art Institute of Chicago. Haley died suddenly in 1904. After her death, Dudley concentrated on landscape painting. In 1905, he was awarded the Art Institute's Young Fortnightly Prize. His brother Clarence also exhibited a series of fine art photographs 1905. These photographs also highlighted the dunes.

== The Dunes ==
In 1911, Frank began to hike the Dunes with his painting equipment. He spent most of his professional life promoting the preservation of the Indiana Dunes. The desires to ‘Save the Dunes’ began in the progressive era of Midwestern politics, centered in Chicago. Industrial development was spreading along the shores of Lake Michigan towards the Dunes In 1913 Dudley married for a second time, to Maida Lewis. The trips into the dunes consisted of finding select vantage points from which to capture the scene on his easel in an all'aperto in a manner of broad, sweeping brushstrokes and textural contrasts of broken color. Maida described her husband's artistic sensitivity: "The Dunes were irresistible, fascinating to him. They were wild and majestic and fresh. He painted them in all seasons and communicated emotion in them to others." (Chicago Tribune, 3 September 1967; quoting Mrs. F.V. Dudley).

Industrial development from Chicago was fast moving east along the Lake Michigan shoreline into the Dunes. The United States Steel Corporation laid out Gary, Indiana in 1906. Jens Jensen, an advocate for the Forest Preserves of Chicago, began leading a series of ‘Saturday Afternoon Walking Trips.’ Beginning in 1908, these trips traveled east of Gary to Mt. Tom. This is the highest of the Indiana Dunes. These hikers formed the Prairie Club, with Jens Jensen and Frank's brother Dudley as its first directors.

In 1913, the club built a beach house north of Mt. Tom. This became the focal point for a movement to create a national Dunes park. Jens Jensen founded Friends of Our Native Landscape in 1913, with the purpose of protecting the natural landscape both for public use and as sanctuaries for plants and animals.

Dudley was active in the second decade of the century: in 1915 he won the Art Institute of Chicago's Butler Prize. The Art Institute also presented a show of his dunes pictures in 1918. Critics were generally complimentary. A year later the Art Institute presented Dudley with the Cahn Prize for his painting The Silent Sentinels. During these years he was unable to devote himself to painting full-time because he ran an art supply store, but he gave up the business in 1921 to spend all of his time painting in the dunes. While Dudley maintained his residence in the city, by 1921 he had designed and built a log cabin studio in Indiana, so that he could "bring the Dunes indoors." (Dudley to Love, 1977). From this primitive base the artist painted the surrounding area, capturing the quiet evanescence of its multi-faced simplicity. Titles such as Winds in the North or Soft Shadows across the Sands or Under Changing Skies, Dunes indicate his concern not only with the constantly changing picturesque characteristics of the scene, but also with the extreme effects of the Lake Michigan atmosphere. Although Dudley exhibited little on the national level, he was very active in the Midwest and became known as the "Dunes Painter" or "Painter of the Dunes."

To rally support for the Dunes movement, the Pairie Club staged an outdoor pageant in the spring of 1917. Dudley painted The Dunes Pageant, set in a natural amphitheater of a blowout. From this start, his works were nearly all based upon the scenery of the dunes. In May 1918, he hosted a one-man show at the Art Institute with 30 paintings. The center of the exhibit was his largest landscape, The Land of Sky and Song. In 1921, he was awarded the Art Institute's prestigious Logan Medal for Duneland. In 1923 with the State of Indiana established Indiana Dunes State Park with Mt Tom at its center.

== Popularity ==
From 1925 until 1943, the Hoosier Salon regularly displayed Dudley's works. The Chicago Galleries Association also sought his painting for display from 1927 to 1956. In the 1931 Chicago Galleries exhibition, Dudley created a 10-year retrospective of his Duneland Studio. Among the highlights of the exhibition were:

== Table ==
Year	Painting	View
1931	Waverly Beach	Dunes Park Pavilion
	The Studio	Interior studio view showing a Dunes painting on an easel.
	The Playground of the Dunes	Uniformed park ranger standing before newly posted rules in the State Park

The exhibition marked the end of the Prairie Club's tenure in the Dunes. Dudley's studio cottage was also in its last years, as it was on land owned by the state of Indiana. To remain, Dudley agreed to donate one painting a year to the state. In this way, he was able to remain in Cottage 108 until 1952. In 1967, ten years after his death, his wife sold 53 paintings to the State of Indiana.
