= Will Vawter =

American painter

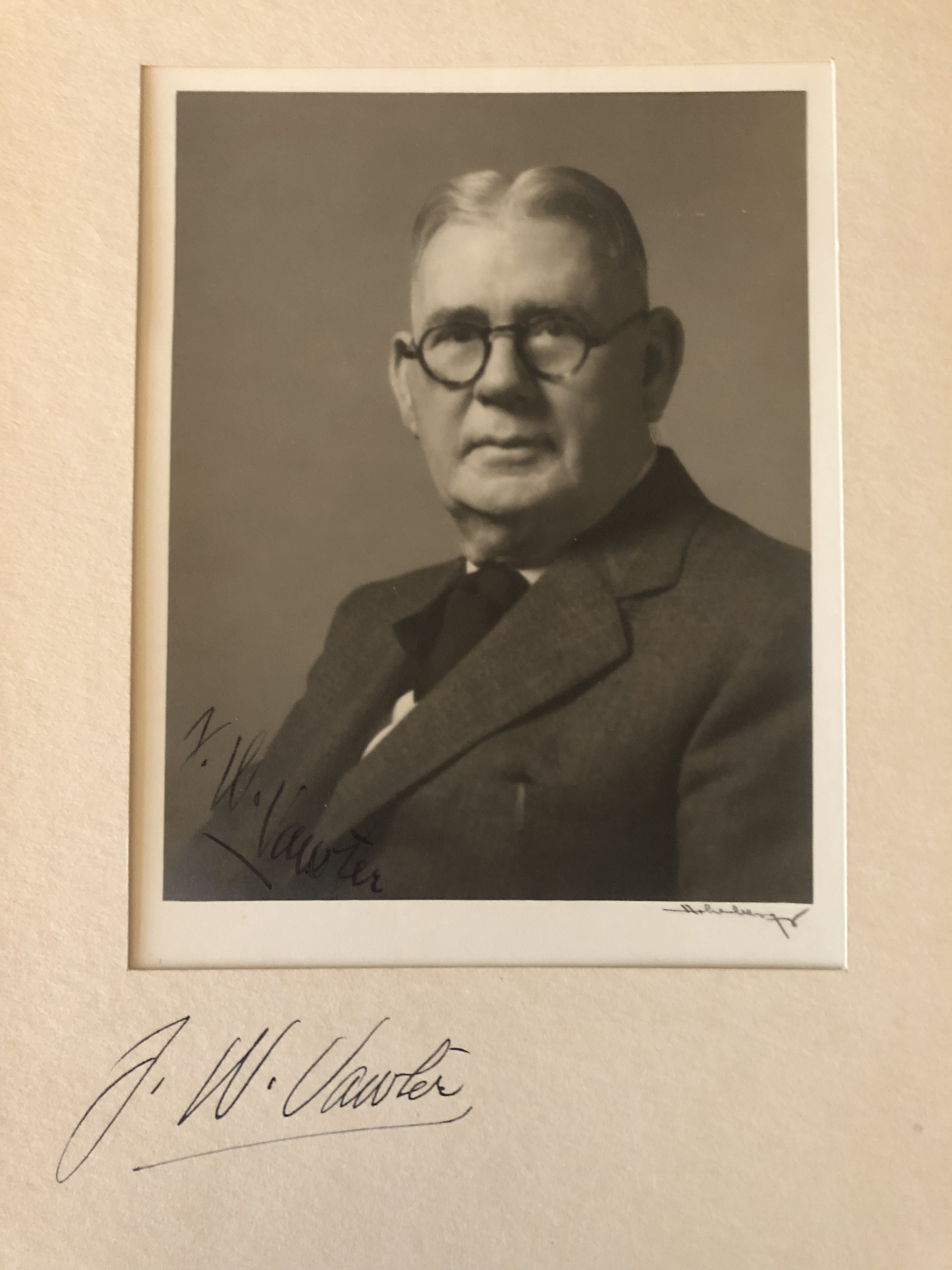
- Portrait of Indiana Artist Will Vawter taken by Brown County photographer Frank M. Hohenberger.
- Born: April 13, 1871; Boone County, West Virginia, U.S.
- Died: February 11, 1941 (aged 69); Nashville, Indiana, U.S.
- Burial place: Greenfield, Indiana, U.S.
- Occupation: Painter
- Known for: Illustrating James Whitcomb Riley poems

John William Vawter (April 13, 1871 – February 11, 1941) was an American landscape artist and illustrator known for his broad strokes and loose Impressionist style.

== Early life and education ==
Named John William Vawter at birth, Vawter was known as Will Vawter both personally and professionally. Vawter was born in Boone County, West Virginia on April 13, 1871. He moved with his family to Greenfield, Indiana, at age six. While living in Greenfield, Vawter developed a close working relationship with poet James Whitcomb Riley, another resident of Greenfield.

== Artistic career ==
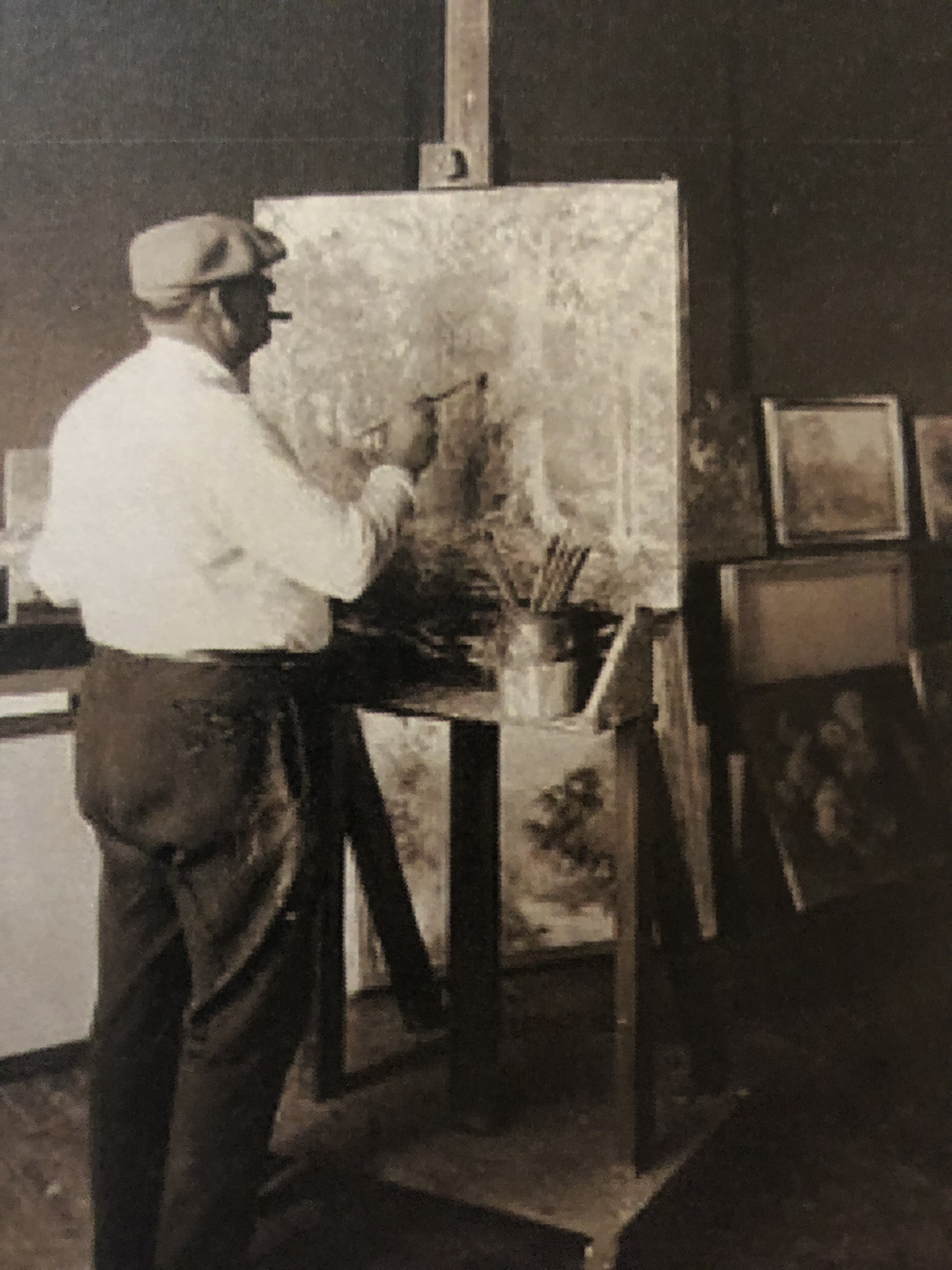
Will Vawter at work in his studio.

Vawter began as an illustrator for a local paper in 1980. Vawter illustrated eleven volumes of James Whitcomb Riley poems. His illustrations often used local residents as models. His work was widely celebrated and he exhibited at the Hoosier Salon and the Brown County Art Gallery Association where he won prizes in 1925, 1926, 1928, 1930, 1932 and 1935. He was married to Mary Vawter, an accomplished poet and landscape artist. The couple divorced in 1923. Vawter moved to Nashville, Indiana, to join the Brown County Art Colony permanently in 1908. He had two residences in the area, one a studio in town, the other a 57 acres (23 hectares) estate about a half mile outside of Nashville. Vawter was a pioneer member of the Brown County Art Gallery Association.

He had exhibits at H. Lieber Co. in Indianapolis.

== Selected works ==
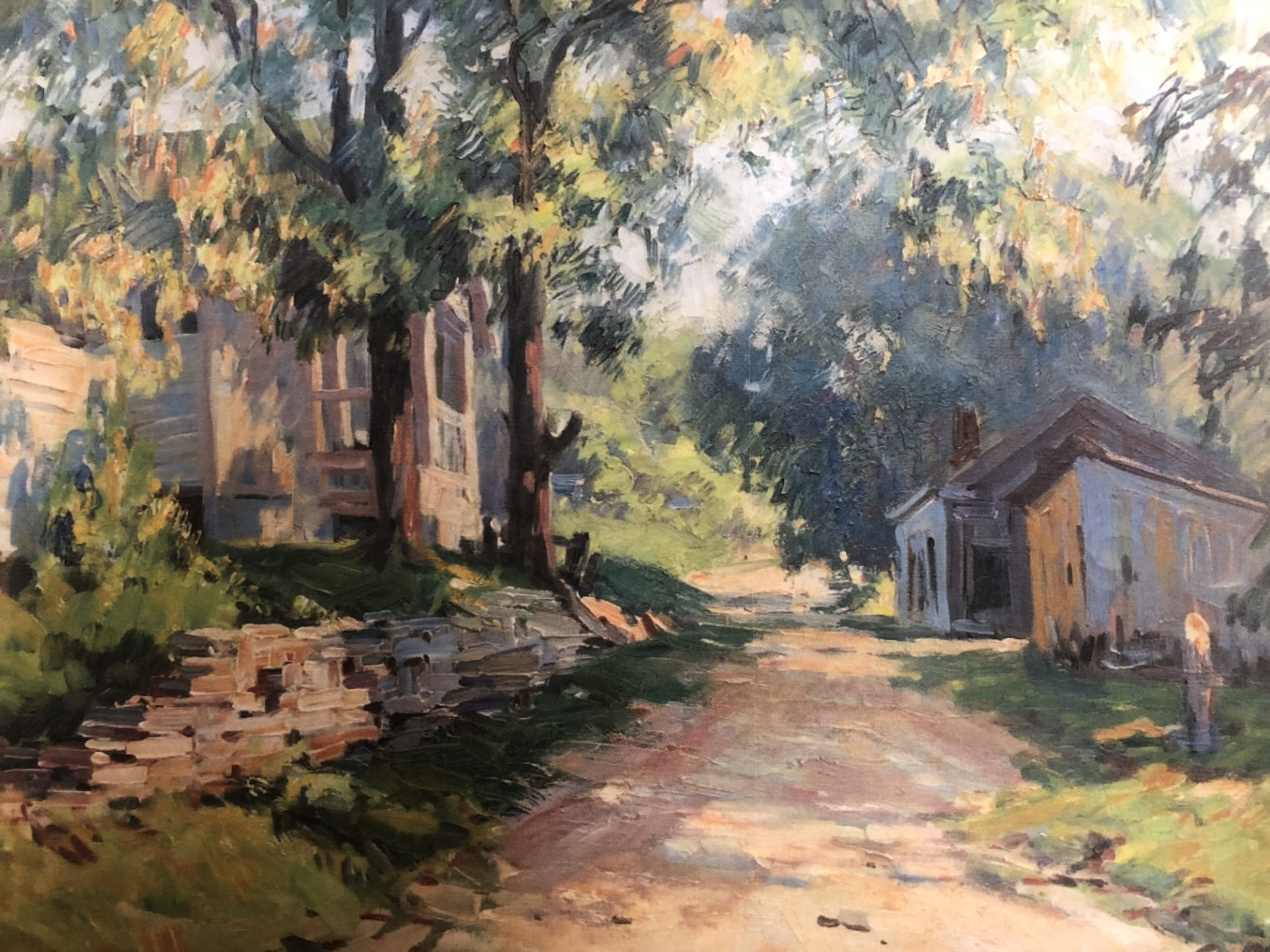
An excellent example of Will Vawter's impressionistic style. This work is titled A Sunny Day In Springville. It depicts the artist's studio in Brown County, Indiana.

- A Defective Santa Claus (1904)
- Riley Songs O'Cheer (1905)
- Riley Songs of Summer (1908)
- Songs of Home (1910)
- Fortunes in Friendship (1926)

== Later life and death ==
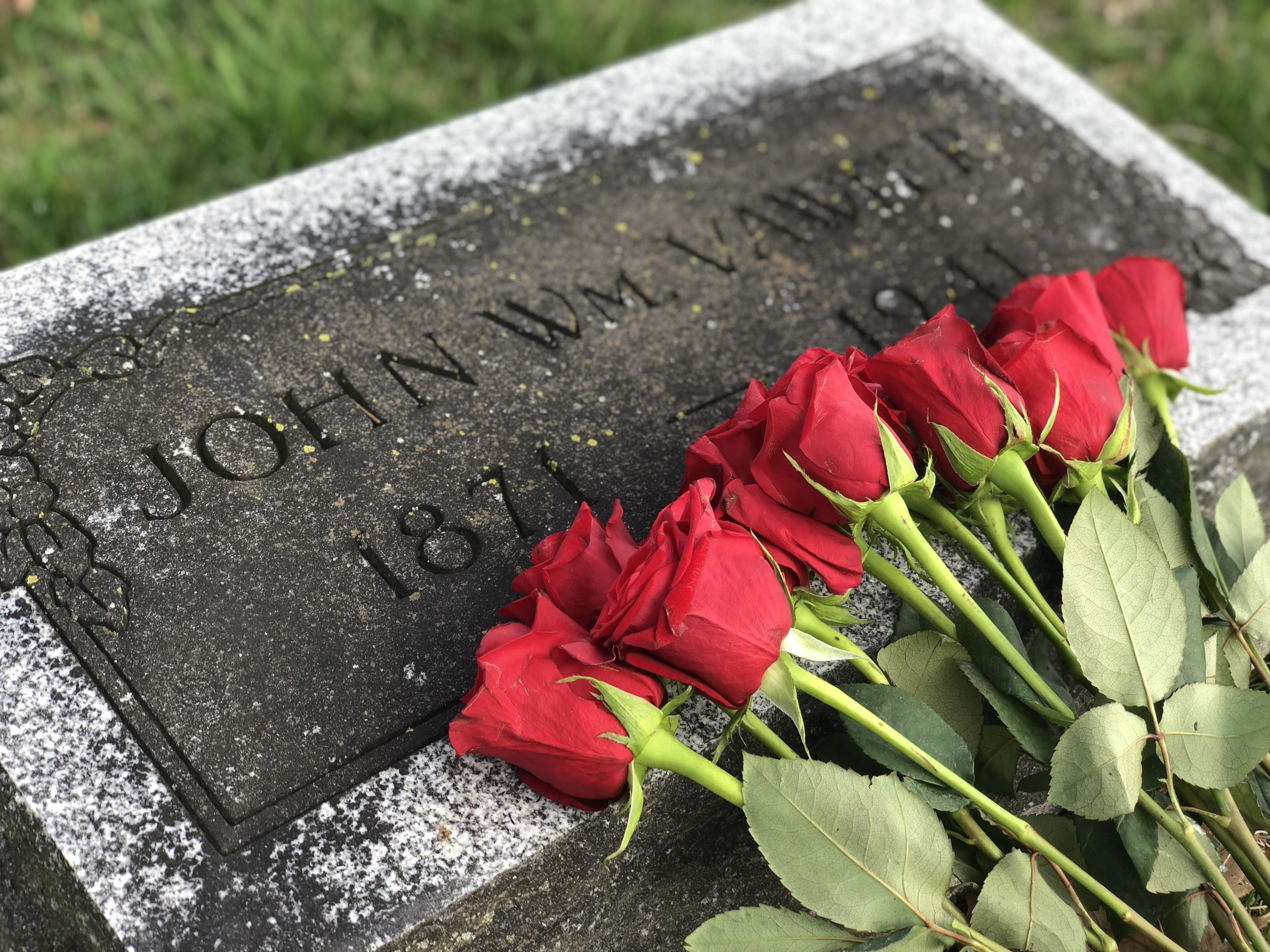
Indiana Artist Will Vawter's grave site in Greenfield, Indiana

Vawter developed pneumonia and died. His death was quite a shock to the residents of Greenfield & Nashville, Indiana. He died in Nashville, Indiana, on February 11, 1941. He is buried in Greenfield, Indiana's Park Cemetery.

== Legacy ==
Each year in the City of Greenfield the Hancock County Arts and Cultural Council holds the Will Vawter Art Exhibition. This juried art show attracts many arts from around Indiana each year. The event was held in early to coincide with Vawter's birth, but since 2021, the exhibit has grown and has been moved to June.

In 2020, the Indiana Historical Bureau erected a marker to honor Vawter.
