= Psi Iota Xi =

American community-based service sorority

- ΨΙΠ
- Founded: September 19, 1897; 128 years ago Central High School, Muncie, IN
- Type: Service, non-collegiate
- Affiliation: Independent
- Status: Active
- Emphasis: Literacy and the arts
- Scope: Regional, Midwest
- Colors: Old gold and Turquoise blue
- Symbol: Lyre and Lamp
- Flower: Yellow rose
- Publication: Helicon
- Philanthropy: Speech and hearing-related causes
- Chapters: 135
- Members: 3,500 active
- Nickname: Si-Oats
- Headquarters: 3905 Vincennes Road, Suite 303; Indianapolis, Indiana 46268; United States
- Website: www.psiiotaxi.org

Psi Iota Xi (ΨΙΞ) is a women's philanthropic and cultural sorority with chapters throughout the midwestern United States. The sorority was formed in 1897 at Central High School in Muncie, Indiana. It was originally a high school sorority and expanded regionally, but changed to become a community-based sorority after Indiana state laws prohibited sororities in public schools. As of 2024, it has chartered 135 chapters in Illinois, Indiana, Ohio, Kentucky, and Michigan. Its focus is art, literature, music, and speech and hearing.

== History ==
Psi Iota Xi was founded on September 19, 1897, in Muncie, Indiana by five high school students and three teachers at Central High School. Its founders wanted to bring diverse art and music experiences to their community; later, its mission expanded its scope to include literature and literacy.

The sorority's founders were:

- Emma Cammack, teacher
- Mary Louise "Marie" Carmichael, student
- Ethelyn Dowell (Hinckley), student
- Martha Ivins, teacher
- Mayme Johnson (Oesterle), student
- Eva Kessler, teacher
- Huda "Hudie" Smith (Kimbrough), student
- Sue Derexa Smith, student

Cammack created the sorority's ritual which is still used. Carmichael edited the first edition of its then-weekly publication, Helicon, released in October 1897. (However, Central High School took over this publication from 1899 to 1901.

By January 1898, Psi Iota Xi had 22 members. Although the rituals of its weekly meetings were secretive, the sorority activities included social events and reading books.

Psi Iota Xi established the Beta chapter at the Evansville High School in Evansville, Indiana on December 26, 1900. Gamma chapter was chartered on April 3, 1903, at North High School in Columbus, Ohio. The sorority held its first convention on August 25 and 26, 1903 in Muncie.

An alumni association was established on June 3, 1904. Its second convention was held on June 25, 1904, in Columbus, Ohio.

The Epsilon chapter was also established in June 1904 at the Columbus High School in Columbus, Indiana. However, Epsilon still had not been recognized by school authorities in January 1906, because of objections to Greek letter societies. As a result, the chapter was not allowed be included in the high school's yearbook. In December 1906, the school board ruled that fraternity and sorority members could no longer wear their pins or colors at school.

Although well on its way to becoming a national high school sorority, Psi Iota Xi was forced to discontinue its association with high schools because a 1907 Indiana state law prohibited secret organizations in Indiana's high schools. Its Zeta chapter at Bloomington High School was the first Greek letter organization in the state to give up its charter due to the law on April 11, 1907.

At its convention in June 1907, the sorority took the position that the new law was unconstitutional and could be evaded by removing its rituals from its bylaws but, nevertheless debated disbanding to comply with the law. Its members left the convention having decided to publicly announce that the sorority was disbanding, to stop wearing the pins and other outward signs of the organization, and to discontinue public events and dances, while continuing to meet sub rosa. However, another deathblow to the Psi Iota Xi came in July 1907 when the National Panhellenic Congress ruled that members of high school sororities could not join the collegiate sororities that comprised the council; this policy only applied to any new members of the sorority.

However Psi Iota Xi still held its convention in Indianapolis in June 1908, with high school representatives from Columbus, Indianapolis, and Muncie, Indiana and Columbus and Dayton, Ohio. Before the convention, the Indianapolis News reported that the sorority planned to added new chapters, despite the state ban on high school Greek letter organizations. However, at the convention, Psi Iota Xi voted to comply with state regulations and become a town-based sorority. Its membership was open for girls ages fifteen to nineteen years old, regardless of whether or not they attended high school. The sorority also welcomed back the Zeta chapter at the convention.

Psi Iota Xi had chartered ten chapters by 1910. It established a national scholarship fund in 1915.

In 1938, the sorority created a mobile speech screening clinic that traveled to every school in Indiana over three years, testing some 6,000 children. This mobile clinic lead to the Indiana State Legislature requiring speech correction in all public schools. In 1946, the sorority started supporting a summer boarding speech and hearing clinic for eight to twelve-year-old children at Ball State University. Psi Iota Xi began a long-term association with the American Speech–Language–Hearing Association in 1977.

The sorority has chartered chapters in Illinois, Indiana, Ohio, Kentucky, and Michigan. As of 2009, there are approximately 3,500 members in 135 chapters. Its focus is no art, literature, music, and speech & hearing. Its national headquarters is at 3905 Vincennes Road, Suite 303 in Indianapolis, IN 46268.

== Symbols ==
Psi Iota Xi's pin featured the Greek letters ΨΙΞ. Its colors are old gold and turquoise blue. Its symbols are the lyre and the lamp. Its nickname is Si-Oats. The sorority adopted its national song at its June 1906 convention; it was written by Helen Spain of the Delta chapter. Its annual publication is Helicon, a name selected from the "Abode of Apollo and the Nine Muses".

The sorority's flower was originally the white carnation. This was changed to the sunflower in June 1908. It is now the yellow rose.

== Membership ==
Membership to Psi Iota Xi is open to women over eighteen.

== Activities ==
Psi Iota Xi chapters raise money and volunteer to improve the quality of life in their communities, with special emphasis on local libraries, summer reading programs, little free libraries, and Everyone Reads Programs.

Its national philanthropy is speech pathology and audiology, helping correct hearing and speech problems for children.

== Chapters ==
As of 2024, it has chartered 135 chapters in Illinois, Indiana, Ohio, Kentucky, and Michigan.
