= Stephen Pace (artist) =

American abstract and figurative artist (1918–2010)

Stephen Pace (December 12, 1918 – September 23, 2010) was an American painter best known for his work as an Abstract expressionist and for his figurative art.

== Biography ==
Pace was born on December 12, 1918, in Charleston, Missouri. Though he had started drawing as a child, he first received a sketchbook from a teacher when he was in the fourth grade. His parents, who had owned a farm and grocery store, moved to New Harmony, Indiana, when Pace was in his teens. His first formal training began when he was 17, when he studied anatomical studies and watercolor painting with Works Progress Administration artist Robert Lahr in Evansville, Indiana.

He served in the United States Army during World War II. He was injured while serving in Europe, and met Gertrude Stein and Pablo Picasso after being hospitalized in Paris. After completing his military service, Pace went to Mexico to study art under the G.I. Bill. While at a school in San Miguel de Allende, he met artist Milton Avery who convinced him to come to New York City to continue his education, learning there at the Art Students League of New York and independently with artist Hans Hofmann. Pace's work as Abstract Expressionist during the 1950s, first displayed in New York at the Artists Gallery, was described by The New York Times as consisting of "dark, energetically worked abstractions achieved through a distinctive blend of brushwork, drawing and staining". Time he spent in Pennsylvania and Maine led Pace to create representational pieces depicting outdoor scenes, such as lobstermen and of his wife while she was gardening, as well as interiors and nudes done in his studio. Though his work often appeared to have been painted very quickly, Pace was often able to make subtle corrections, saying of himself that "You might call me a fake Zen painter".

Pace donated a series of paintings to the University of Southern Indiana as part of a collection of 6,000 pieces of his work from as early as 1947, and he and his wife donated $1.5 million to found the Kenneth P. McCutchan Art Center/Palmina F. and Stephen S. Pace Galleries. Pace's work was exhibited in a number of galleries, including the Anita Shapolsky Gallery in New York City, the Turtle Gallery in Maine, and the W. Wickiser Gallery in New York City.

A resident of Manhattan and Stonington, Maine, Pace died of pneumonia at the age of 91 on September 23, 2010, at St. Mary's Hospital in Evansville, after having lived for one year at an assisted-living facility in Evansville and then moving to his home and studio in New Harmony, Indiana. His wife and business manager Palmina F. (Pam) Natalini died February 8, 2015, in Livingston, New Jersey.
