= Browning Hill =

Hill in Brown County, Indiana

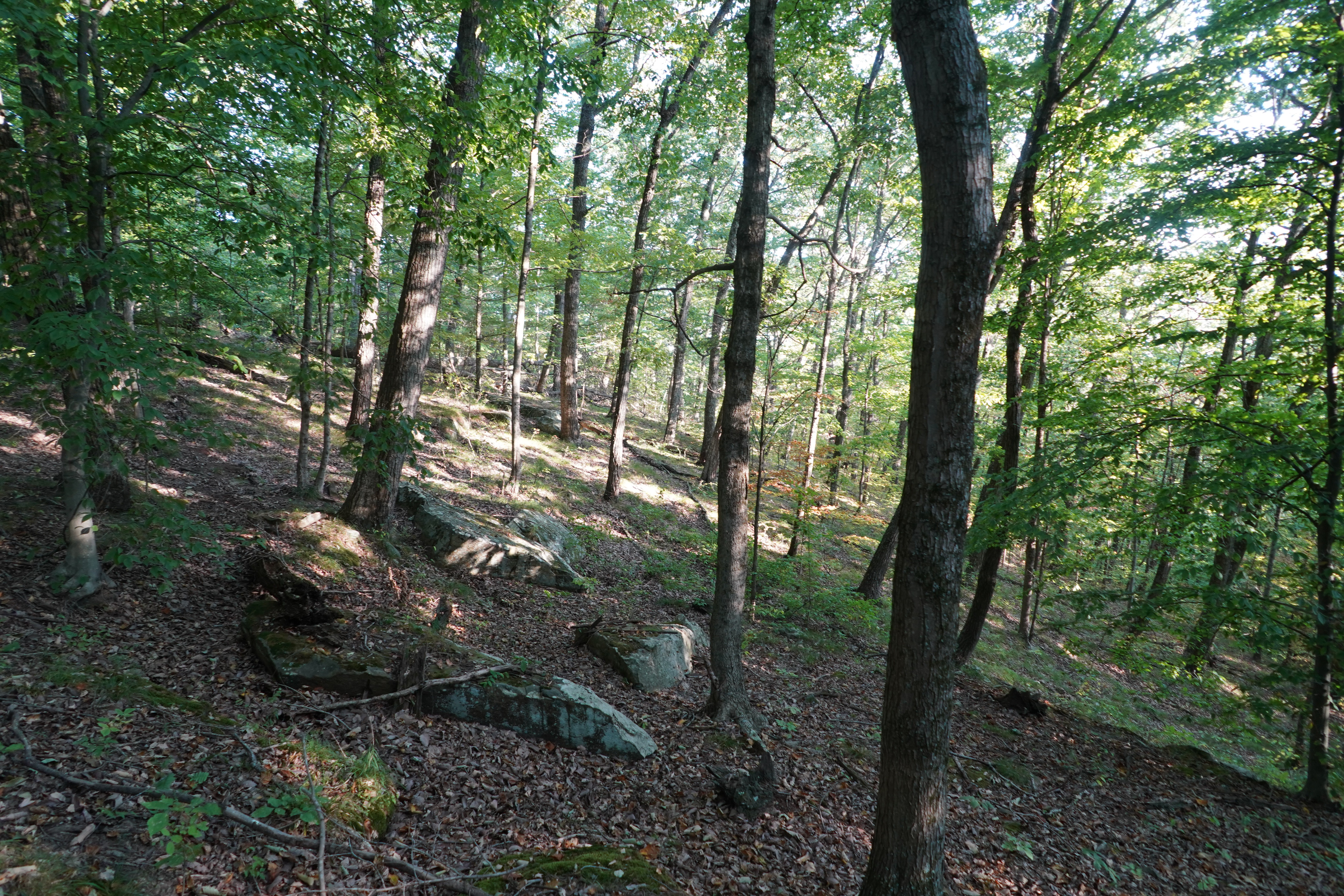
- Browning Hill

Highest point
- Elevation: 928 feet (283 m)
- Coordinates: 39°06′N 86°26′W

Geography
- Location: Indiana, USA
- Topo map: USGS

Browning Hill, known locally as Browning Mountain, is, at 928 feet (283 m) tall, the 53rd highest peak in Indiana. Located in Brown County, near the town of Story, the hill is partly in Hoosier National Forest, and is designated a special management area by the United States Forest Service due to the "relatively undisturbed" old-growth forest that covers it.

The hill has acquired an air of mystery. It looms over the ghost town of Elkinsville and is topped by a limestone "field of boulders", giving rise to its nickname, "Indiana's Stonehenge." Various explanations are given for how the stones got there, such as it being a Native American site for ceremonies or a cabin's foundation, but according to a naturalist, it is most probable that early settlers quarried the stones and then left them behind when they moved on to other locations.
