= Grandview Apostolic Church =

- Grandview Church
- Formerly listed on the U.S. National Register of Historic Places
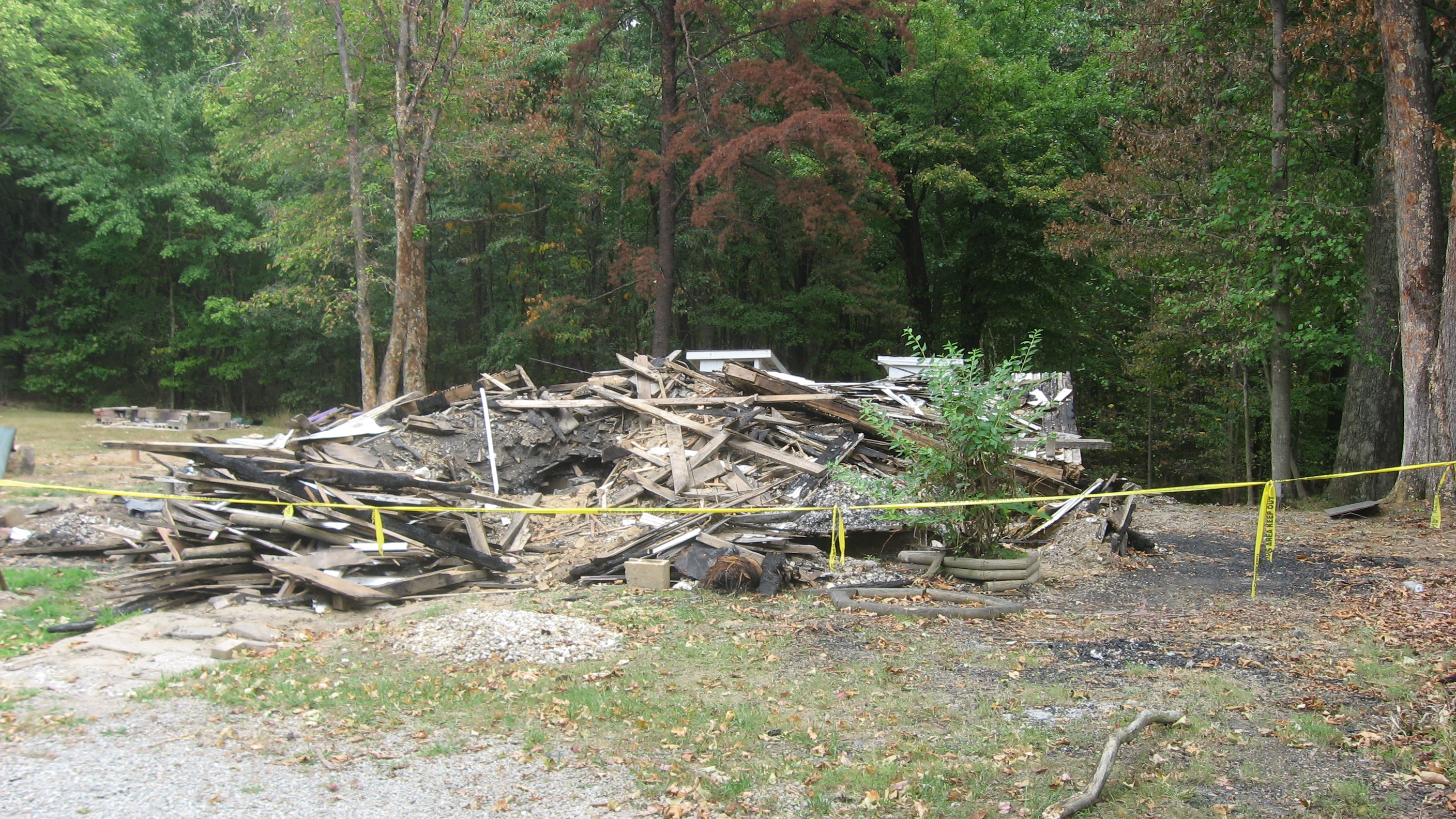
- Site of the church after its destruction

- Location within Indiana Location within the United States
- Nearest city: New Bellsville, Indiana
- Coordinates: 39°7′28″N 86°5′4″W
- Area: 1.3 acres (0.53 ha)
- Built: 1892
- Architectural style: Gable front
- NRHP reference No.: 91001160

Significant dates
- Added to NRHP: September 13, 1991
- Removed from NRHP: September 29, 2010

Grandview Apostolic Church was a historic church building in Brown County, Indiana, United States. Built in 1892 along Grandview Ridge Road near the community of New Bellsville, it lay in far eastern Van Buren Township. The church was a frame structure with a facade that featured a steeple, while the interior consisted of only a single room.

A part of the denomination known as the Apostolic Church, Grandview Apostolic was the second oldest existing church building in Brown County. It closed during the twentieth century, but a congregation was restarted there in the early 1990s, and the building remained in active use by that congregation until 2010. In 1991, the church building and two related structures, plus the cemetery, were added to the National Register of Historic Places because of their place in local history and because of their well-preserved historic architecture. Such a distinction is unusual; both cemeteries and religious properties must pass higher hurdles than most other types of properties in order to qualify for inclusion on the National Register.

The church before its destruction; note its small size and prominent steeple

Before dawn on July 14, 2010, a neighbor called firefighters to report that the church was burning, prompting a response from firefighters from the Hamblen Township, Fruitdale, Nashville, and Van Buren Township volunteer fire departments. Little more than half an hour after the initial emergency call, the fire was under control, but the church had already been destroyed; the only thing saved was the pastor's Bible. Determined to continue as a congregation, the church's forty-five members later decided to take the name of "New Beginnings Church" and began worshipping elsewhere.

Within two weeks of the church's destruction, seven teenage residents of Columbus, Indiana were arrested and charged with arson. One of the seven admitted setting the fire; according to him, the group committed the act as the result of a days-long planning process. Claiming that the group burned the church while under the influence of LSD, he stated that they had believed Grandview Apostolic Church to be a community of Satan worshippers.

On September 29, 2010, the National Park Service withdrew the church's historic site status.
