= Becks Grove, Indiana =

- Unincorporated community
- Brown County's location in Indiana

- Location in Brown County
- Coordinates: 39°04′45″N 86°07′00″W
- Country: United States
- State: Indiana
- County: Brown
- Township: Van Buren
- Elevation: 853 ft (260 m)
- Time zone: UTC-5 (Eastern (EST))
  - Summer (DST): UTC-4 (EDT)
- ZIP code: 47448
- Area codes: 812 & 930
- GNIS feature ID: 450666

Becks Grove is an unincorporated community in Van Buren Township, Brown County, in the U.S. state of Indiana.

== History ==
Becks Grove had a post office between 1868 and 1895. It was named for the Beck family of early settlers.
