= Peoga, Indiana =

- Unincorporated community
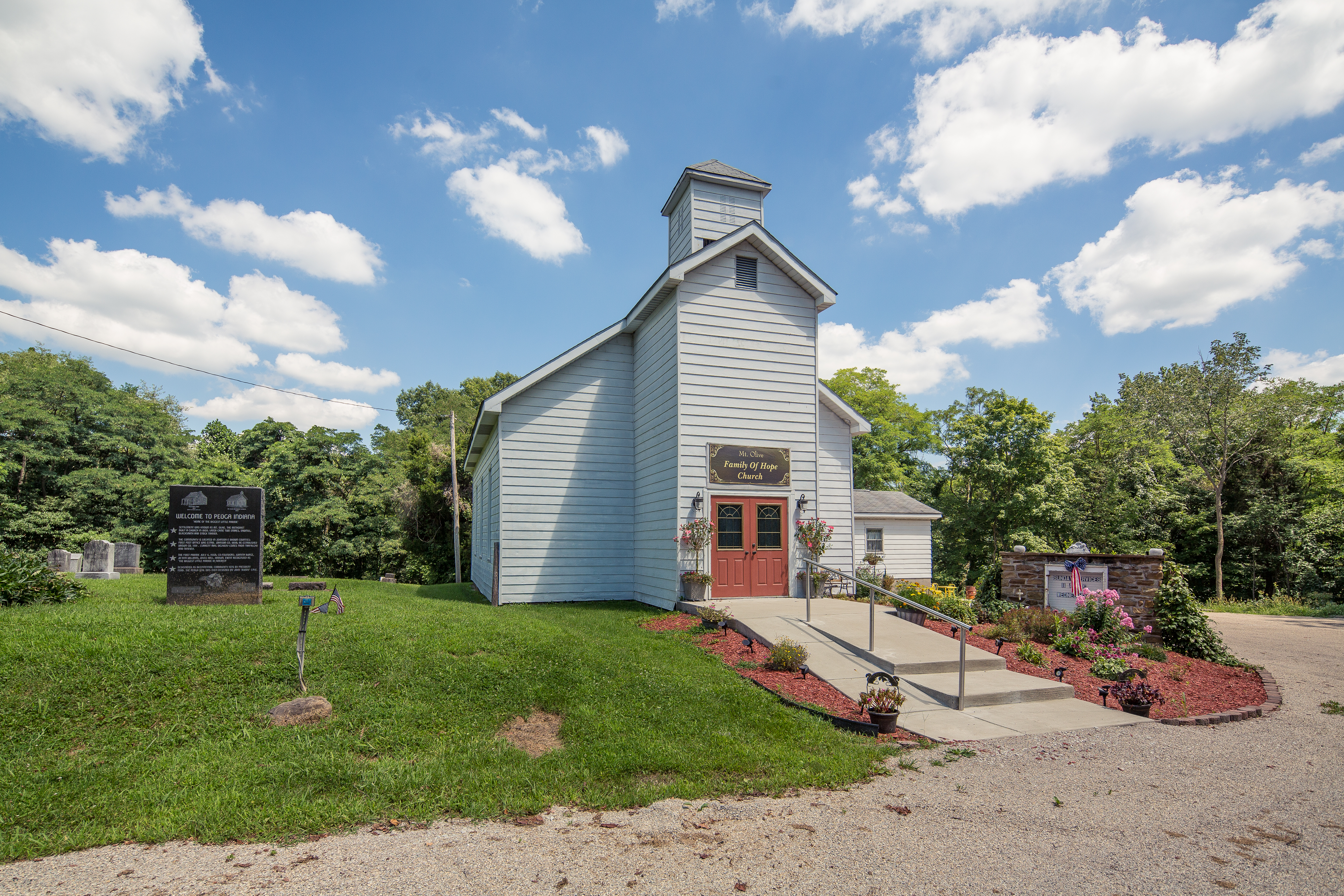

- Location within Indiana Location within the United States
- Coordinates: 39°20′35″N 86°08′39″W
- Country: United States
- State: Indiana
- Counties: Brown, Johnson
- Township: Hamblen, Hensley
- Elevation: 1,001 ft (305 m)
- Time zone: UTC-5 (Eastern (EST))
  - Summer (DST): UTC-4 (EDT)
- ZIP code: 46181
- FIPS code: 18-58824
- GNIS feature ID: 441007

Peoga is an unincorporated community in Brown and Johnson counties, in the U.S. state of Indiana.

== History ==
A post office was established at Peoga in 1898, and remained in operation until it was discontinued in 1903. According to one source, Peoga is believed to be derived from an Indian word meaning "village".
