= Gatesville =

Gatesville is the name of some places in the United States:

- Gatesville, Indiana
- Gatesville, North Carolina
- Gatesville, Texas

Other uses:

- Gatesville, Athlone, a commercial zone in Athlone, Cape Town, South Africa
