= Story, Indiana =

- Unincorporated community
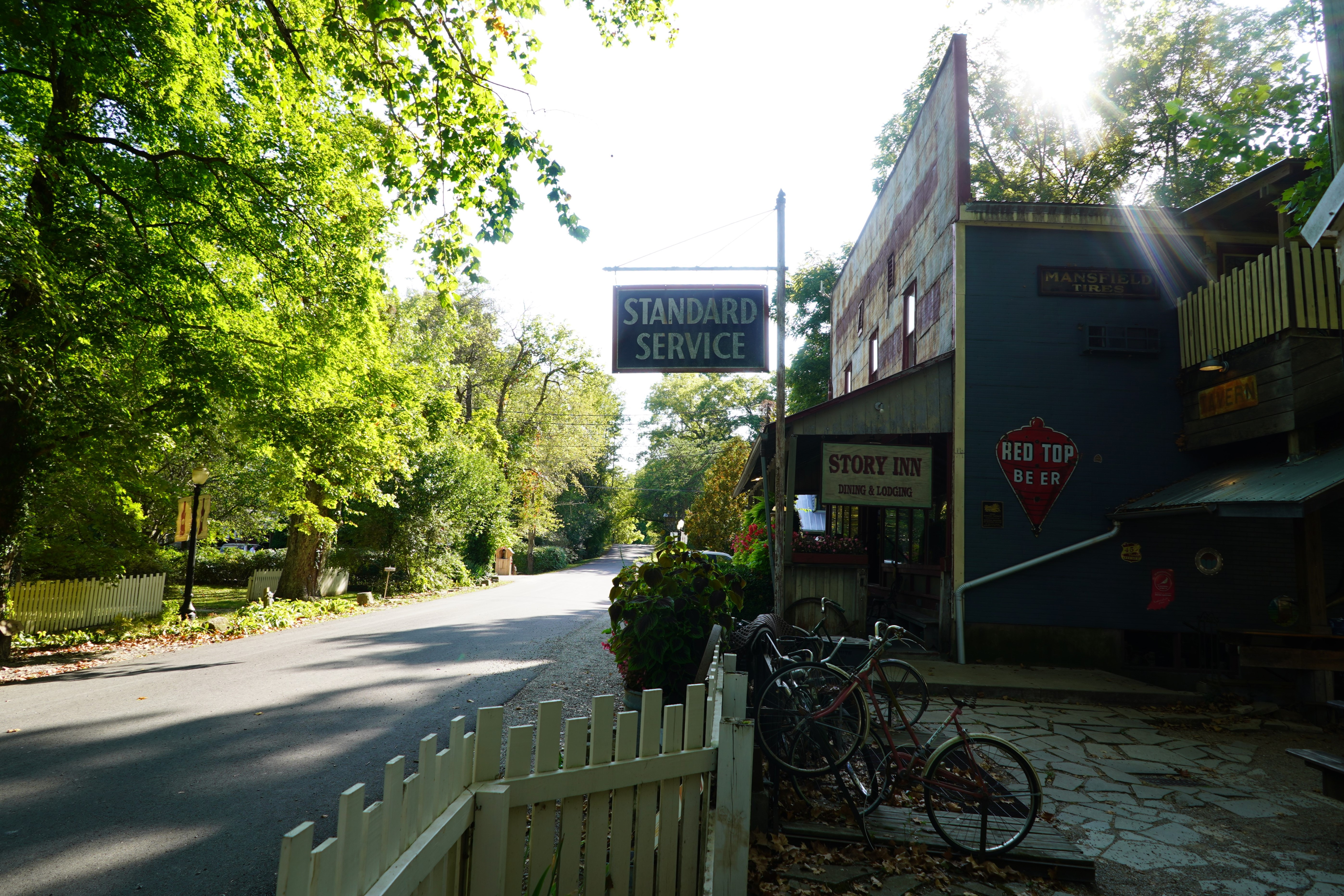
- Story, Indiana

- Brown County's location in Indiana

- Location in Brown County
- Coordinates: 39°05′56″N 86°12′50″W
- Country: United States
- State: Indiana
- County: Brown
- Township: Van Buren
- Elevation: 577 ft (176 m)

Population (2000)
  - Total: 4
- Time zone: UTC-5 (Eastern (EST))
  - Summer (DST): UTC-4 (EDT)
- ZIP code: 47448
- Area codes: 812 & 930
- FIPS code: 18-73628
- GNIS feature ID: 451514

Story is an unincorporated community in Van Buren Township, Brown County, in the U.S. state of Indiana.

== History ==
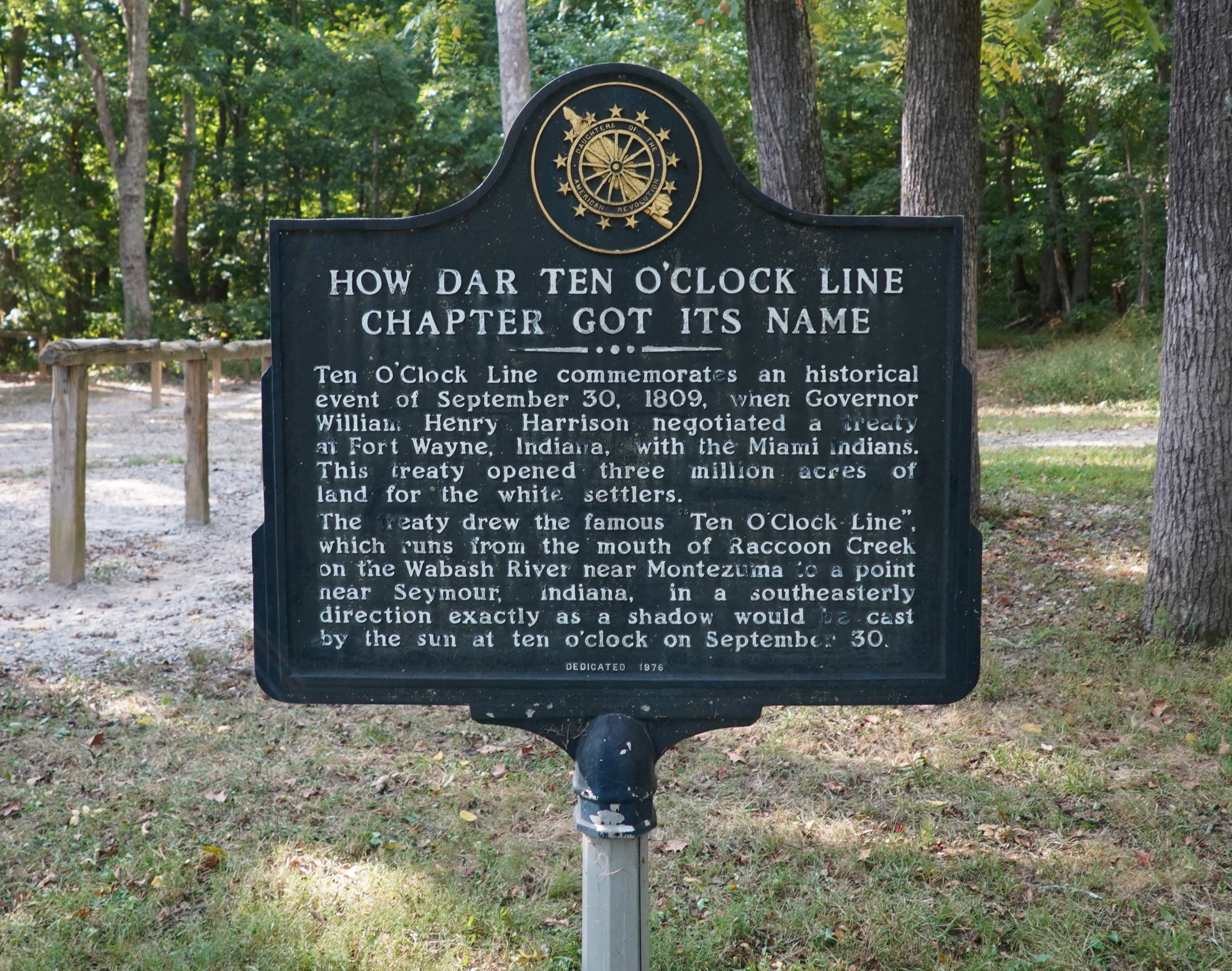
Story, Indiana Historical Marker

Brown County, Indiana, was created in 1836 from portions of Monroe, Delaware, Jackson and Bartholomew counties. The land had been acquired from the Native American tribes in two parts based on a treaty line that ran from Seymour northwest towards Montezuma known as the "Ten O’Clock Treaty Line" and later referred to as the “Indian Boundary Line". The land southwest of the line was obtained in 1809 in the Treaty of Fort Wayne was known as “Harrison’s Purchase", while the land northeast of the line was obtained in 1818 in the Treaty of St. Mary’s, known as the “New Purchase.” The area encompassing the village of Story was opened to European settlement on September 30, 1809, and sat directly on the boundary line. Today, that line is denoted by the Story Monument in the center of Story’s village green.

The village of Story is named for Dr. George P. Story, who received a land patent for 173 acres from President Millard Fillmore in 1851. This original land patent is on display at the Story Inn. During the early 1850s, Dr. Story moved from Ohio to settle on the acreage. Family farms, the doctor’s medical practice, a township school and a grist mill were established over the following twenty years, prompting local reference to the area as "Storyville". Formal creation of the village of Story occurred in 1882, when Dr. Arnold S. Griffitt continued operation of the medical practice and farming operations, and established a dry goods store that housed the first post office. The village’s first church congregation was also founded. The Story-Griffitt House (a c.1858 I-house) is now part of Story Inn.

In the 1880s and 1890s, the village centered around the general store and grist mill, first owned and operated by Dr. Griffitt and later by Willard Fulks. A saw mill was later added and previously written narratives indicate Story also had a blacksmith shop and a slaughterhouse, both of which were commonly found in small rural villages. In 1900, the store and grist mill were sold to Alra and Mary Wheeler. They lived in the Queen Anne style Wheeler-Hedrick House across from the store, now part of the Story Inn. During the 1910s, as other villages in Van Buren Township dwindled, Story retained importance due to its general store that continued to operate into the 1950s.

After the original store building expanded sometime between 1911 and early 1915, the building burned in November 1915. Following the fire, one report claimed of Wheeler’s store that “his stock was one of the largest in the county.” The set back was short lived, however, as a new two-story store building was soon constructed with "Wheeler General Store" painted across the upper facade. The store supplied several huckster wagons that traveled the region each week and the business included operation of the grain mill. Oral interviews claim the store served as the wool-buying center for the county, with Wheeler taking the wool to mills in Seymour, Indiana, and that it employed six full-time employees.

Growth and success of the village and the need to supply huckster wagons prompted another resident to open a second store sometime in the 1920s. However, it had closed by the early 1930s. One source from 1929 states of Story, “the village is now a prosperous little town containing two stores, a non-denominational church, school, and several residences in the midst of fertile farming land.”

Wheeler died in 1921 and in early 1924, Albert and Susan Hedrick purchased the general store, saw mill, the Wheeler home and a small amount of additional land surrounding the buildings. The Hedricks purchased the store and associated businesses in partnership with their oldest son, Ralph, and the store was renamed "Hedrick & Son Grocery". The 1920s into the 1930s were the busiest years for the general store and its associated operations during the Hedrick family ownership. The store sold a wide assortment of necessities including farm equipment, clothing, shoes, local produce and meat. A March 1924 ad shows the store was one of only a handful of Brown County locations offering Certified Seed Potatoes. Meat sold in the store was also processed onsite, with thirty-five hogs butchered in one year alone. By 1930, Ralph and his wife, Brunell, and their young son, Robert, were living in the c.1920 house immediately adjacent to the store. Among other duties, Ralph was operating the saw and feed grain mills and his youngest sister, Clotha, was a sales person in the store. She became known for her pickled bologna.

Farming in the hilly, rocky terrain of what is today the Hoosier National Forest region was a difficult undertaking as farms in the area dealt with poor soil made worse due to soil run off from the clear cutting of the forests. When the government began offering to buy their land in the 1920s for creation of Brown County State Park, many farmers gladly accepted. Brown County lost half of its population between 1930 and 1940 due to the Great Depression and much of the farming ceased. Creation of Yellowwood State Forest, Hoosier National Forest and the Charles C. Deam Wilderness Area displaced even more from the area. For these reasons, Brown County is 80% forested today, mostly consisting of second-growth trees. The loss of population, and therefore customers, began the decline of Story's commercial prosperity.

The United States Army Corps of Engineers flooded the area west of Story in 1960, creating the reservoir known as Lake Monroe, the state's second-largest man-made lake. The town of Elkinsville, Indiana, was abandoned and the road that once connected to State Road 46, past the home and studio of artist T. C. Steele (and what is now the T.C. Steele State Historic Site), was closed, cutting Story’s access to Bloomington, Indiana. Elkinsville Road serves as Story’s main street, but it now dead-ends four miles (6 km) to the west at a fallen iron bridge. Further isolated, Story’s decline continued. Clotha Hedrick operated the store until 1969, installing a lunch counter to serve park visitors and passing motorists, and operating the only fuel service for the surrounding area. The Standard Service gold and red crown gas pumps installed circa 1937 still stand today in front of the building. Little new construction followed the Great Depression, and no attempts were made to “modernize” the aging structures of Story that still stand today.

Nature has reclaimed most of Brown County, and today the area surrounding Story is wild and natural. Story sits at the edge of Salt Creek, a 100-mile (160 km) system of quiet, slow-moving tributaries which now form the backwaters of Lake Monroe. This moist bottomland, now under the protection of the Indiana Department of Natural Resources, is a spawning ground for fish and fowl alike.

== Story Inn ==
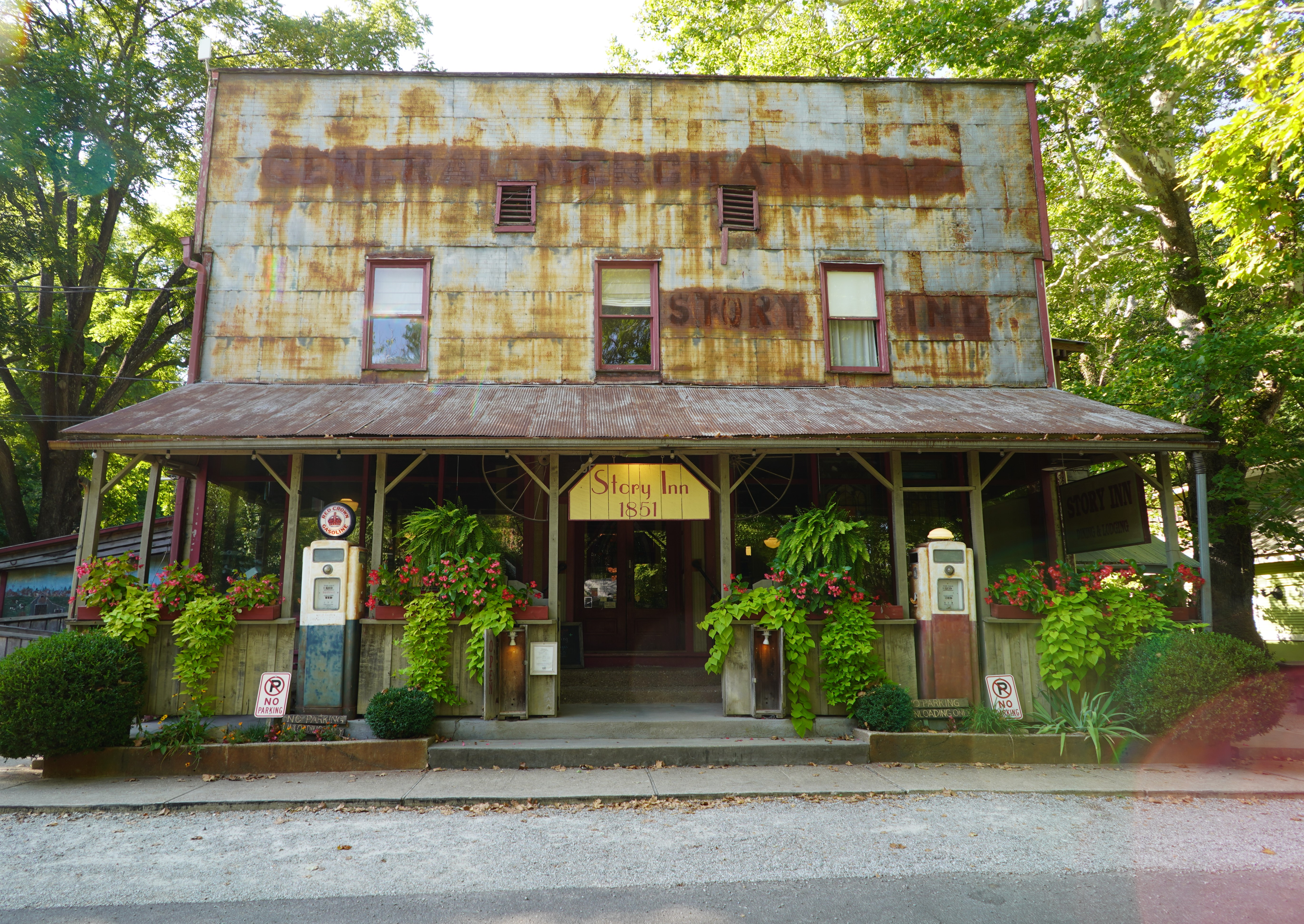
Story Inn

The general store continued to operate to some degree through the 1970s. In 1978, Benjamin (one name) and his wife, Cynthia Schultz, purchased four and a half acres that included the grocery store, grist mill, barn, and a small rented house. They initially occupied the second floor of the store building as their residence. Benjamin, an architect and builder with restaurant experience, and Cynthia, a former restaurant owner, jointly pursued their vision of creating a bed and breakfast. In this manner, the "Story Inn" was born. In the decade that followed the couple re-assembled the nearly 24 acres that today defines the old town, converting the upstairs of the grocery store and the surrounding cottages into guest homes and making the name "Story Inn" synonymous with the town itself. The business prospered as destination B&B's gained popularity.

Benjamin and Cynthia Schultz sold the Story Inn in 1992, and the town once again fell into hard times. A federal bankruptcy was followed by receivership, and the entire town was sold at sheriff's sale on February 14, 1999, to an entity owned by Rick Hofstetter, an Indianapolis attorney and preservationist, and Frank Mueller, a German-born restaurateur. Hofstetter and Mueller had previously helped to renovate the iconic Athenaeum (Das Deutsche Haus) in Indianapolis, with Hofstetter serving as the first President of the Athenaeum Foundation and Mueller as the manager of the Rathskeller Restaurant in its basement.

The village of Story, Indiana, is now a little more than its country inn bed & breakfast. The second floor of the Old Wheeler-Hedrick General Store, which local lore has that it was also once a Studebaker buggy dealership where wagons and buggy were assembled, has been renovated into four bed & breakfast accommodations notable for its ghost named the “Blue Lady". The Blue Lady is supposedly an innocuous apparition with flowing white robes whose cheeky behavior has been observed by Story Inn employees and recorded in guest books since the 1970s.

Story’s Old General Store is now a restaurant. Much of the history of Story and the region which straddles the Ohio River, is depicted in Rick Hofstetter's book, Kentuckiana Roads: A Freidenker's Story of Life in America's Flyover Middle. In March, 2019, the village was listed on the National Register of Historic Places.

Story Inn hosts the annual Indiana Wine Fair in May. The Inn is just thirteen miles from the village of Nashville, Indiana and is located adjacent to the southwestern boundary of Brown County State Park.
