= Christiansburg =

Christiansburg can refer to a place in the United States:

- Christiansburg, Indiana
- Christiansburg, Ohio
- Christiansburg, Virginia
