= Helmsburg, Indiana =

- Unincorporated community and Census-designated place
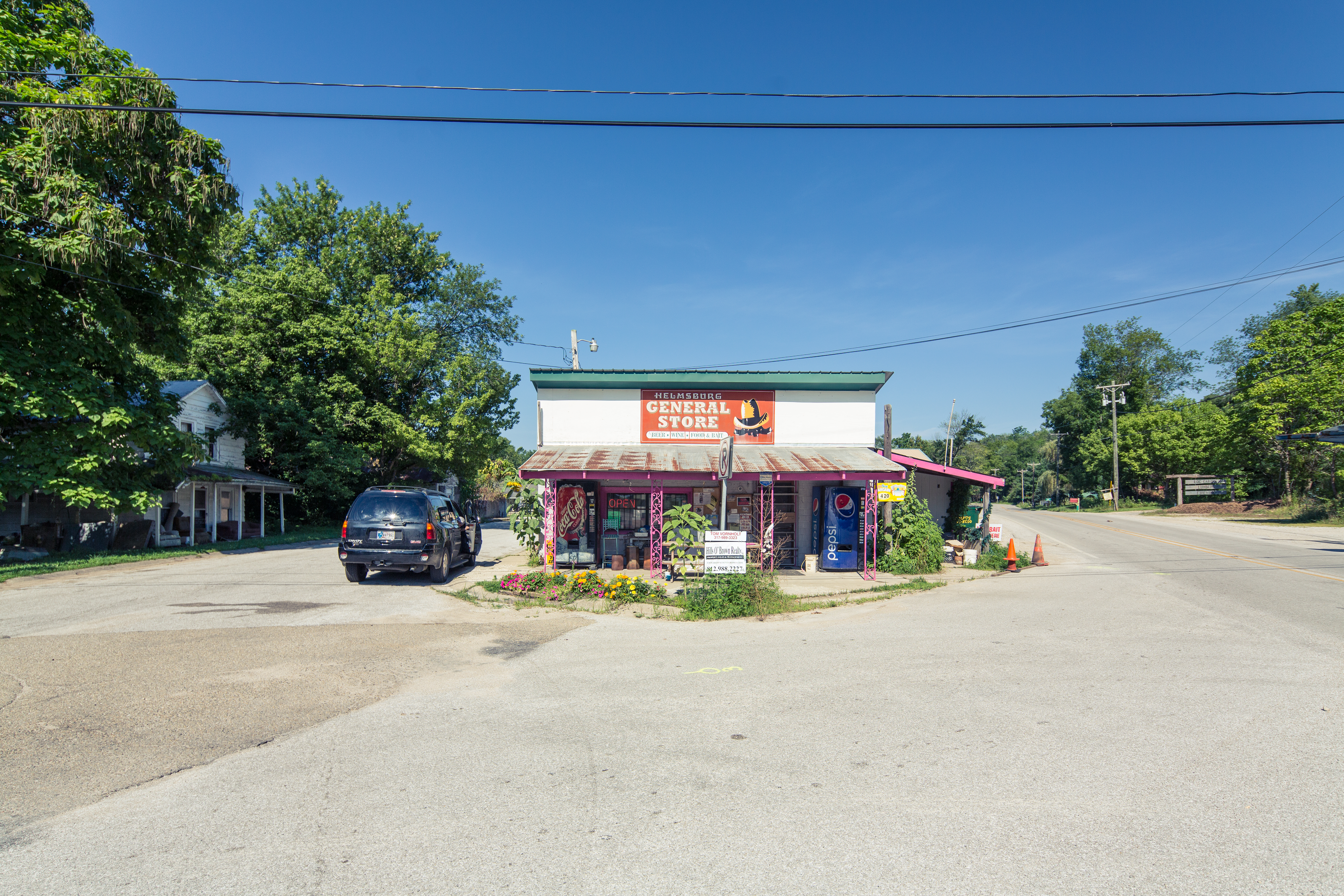

- Brown County's location in Indiana

- Location in Brown County
- Coordinates: 39°16′04″N 86°17′47″W
- Country: United States
- State: Indiana
- County: Brown
- Township: Jackson
- Elevation: 699 ft (213 m)
- Time zone: UTC-5 (Eastern (EST))
  - Summer (DST): UTC-4 (EDT)
- ZIP codes: 47435
- Area codes: 812 & 930
- GNIS feature ID: 2830323

Helmsburg (also Helms) is an unincorporated community in southern Jackson Township, Brown County, in the U.S. state of Indiana. It lies along State Road 45 north of the town of Nashville, the county seat of Brown County. Its elevation is 666 feet (203 m). Although Helmsburg is unincorporated, it has a post office, with the ZIP code of 47435.

== History ==
The first post office at Helmsburg was established as Helms, in 1904. The community was named in honor of John Helms, a local resident.

The children of Helmsburg are served by Helmsburg Elementary School. Industry in Helmsburg includes Helmsburg Sawmill, Inc. (Bill Pool and Sons Sawmill), Electric Metal Fab, which produces stainless steel equipment for the food and pharmaceutical industries (now closed), and For Bare Feet Sock Factory (now moved to Martinsville, IN), which makes many of the socks, headbands, and wristbands NBA players wear during games. Sights in Helmsburg include the Helmsburg General Store, Helmsburg Antiques, and Figtree Gallery & Coffee Shop (now closed) which includes an art gallery, Star Wars memorabilia display, and uniquely painted zebra stripe fire engine. Travelers to Helmsburg may find accommodation at McGinley Vacation Cabins or in nearby Beanblossom or Nashville, Indiana. Areas surrounding Helmsburg are heavily forested, much of this being Yellowwood State Forest. Local wildlife includes whitetail deer, ruffed grouse, squirrel, turkey, fox, woodcock, raccoon and opossums. Residents participate in numerous outdoor recreations including hunting in Yellowwood State Forest, fishing in Yellowwood Lake and Beanblossom Creek, and hiking on Ten O'Clock Line and Tecumseh Trails nearby.

== Demographics ==
The United States Census Bureau delineated Helmsburg as a census designated place in the 2022 American Community Survey.

== Notable person ==
- Bobby Helms, the country music singer known for his songs "Jingle Bell Rock", "Fraulein", and "My Special Angel", was born in Helmsburg, a member of the family for which the community was named.
