= Cordry Sweetwater Lakes, Indiana =

- Census-designated place
- Location of Cordry Sweetwater Lakes in Brown County, Indiana.

- Location within Indiana
- Coordinates: 39°18′31″N 86°07′35″W
- Country: United States
- State: Indiana
- County: Brown
- Township: Hamblen

Area
  - Total: 3.31 sq mi (8.56 km^{2})
  - Land: 2.67 sq mi (6.91 km^{2})
  - Water: 0.64 sq mi (1.66 km^{2})
- Elevation: 876 ft (267 m)

Population (2020)
  - Total: 1,274
  - Density: 477.8/sq mi (184.48/km^{2})
- Time zone: UTC-5 (Eastern (EST))
  - Summer (DST): UTC-4 (EDT)
- ZIP code: 46164
- Area codes: 812 & 930
- FIPS code: 18-15115
- GNIS feature ID: 2629877
- Website: www.cordrysweetwater.org

Cordry Sweetwater Lakes is a census-designated place (CDP) in Hamblen Township, Brown County, in the U.S. state of Indiana. As of the 2020 census, Cordry Sweetwater Lakes had a population of 1,274. Sweetwater Lake is 260 acres in size.

== History ==
Cordry Sweetwater Lakes had its start in the 1960s with the completion of the Cordry and Sweetwater dams. The dams impounded the Cordry and Sweetwater lakes, around which property developers built up the community.

== Geography ==
Cordry Sweetwater Lakes is located in northeastern Brown County. It consists of a residential community surrounding two reservoirs, Cordry Lake and Sweetwater Lake.

According to the United States Census Bureau, the CDP has a total area of 3.4 square miles (8.8 km^{2}), of which 2.7 square miles (7.1 km^{2}) is land and 0.66 square miles (1.7 km^{2}), or 18.94%, is water.

== Demographics ==
Historical population
Census	Pop.	Note	%±
2020	1,274		—
U.S. Decennial Census

=== 2020 census ===
As of the 2020 census, Cordry Sweetwater Lakes had a population of 1,274. The median age was 52.0 years. 17.8% of residents were under the age of 18 and 24.0% of residents were 65 years of age or older. For every 100 females there were 100.0 males, and for every 100 females age 18 and over there were 103.7 males age 18 and over.

0.0% of residents lived in urban areas, while 100.0% lived in rural areas.

There were 556 households in Cordry Sweetwater Lakes, of which 20.7% had children under the age of 18 living in them. Of all households, 60.8% were married-couple households, 18.3% were households with a male householder and no spouse or partner present, and 14.4% were households with a female householder and no spouse or partner present. About 24.6% of all households were made up of individuals and 10.7% had someone living alone who was 65 years of age or older.

There were 1,180 housing units, of which 52.9% were vacant. The homeowner vacancy rate was 2.7% and the rental vacancy rate was 0.0%.

Racial composition as of the 2020 census
Race	Number	Percent
White	1,228	96.4%
Black or African American	7	0.5%
American Indian and Alaska Native	0	0.0%
Asian	6	0.5%
Native Hawaiian and Other Pacific Islander	0	0.0%
Some other race	9	0.7%
Two or more races	24	1.9%
Hispanic or Latino (of any race)	9	0.7%
