= Beanblossom, Indiana =

- Unincorporated community
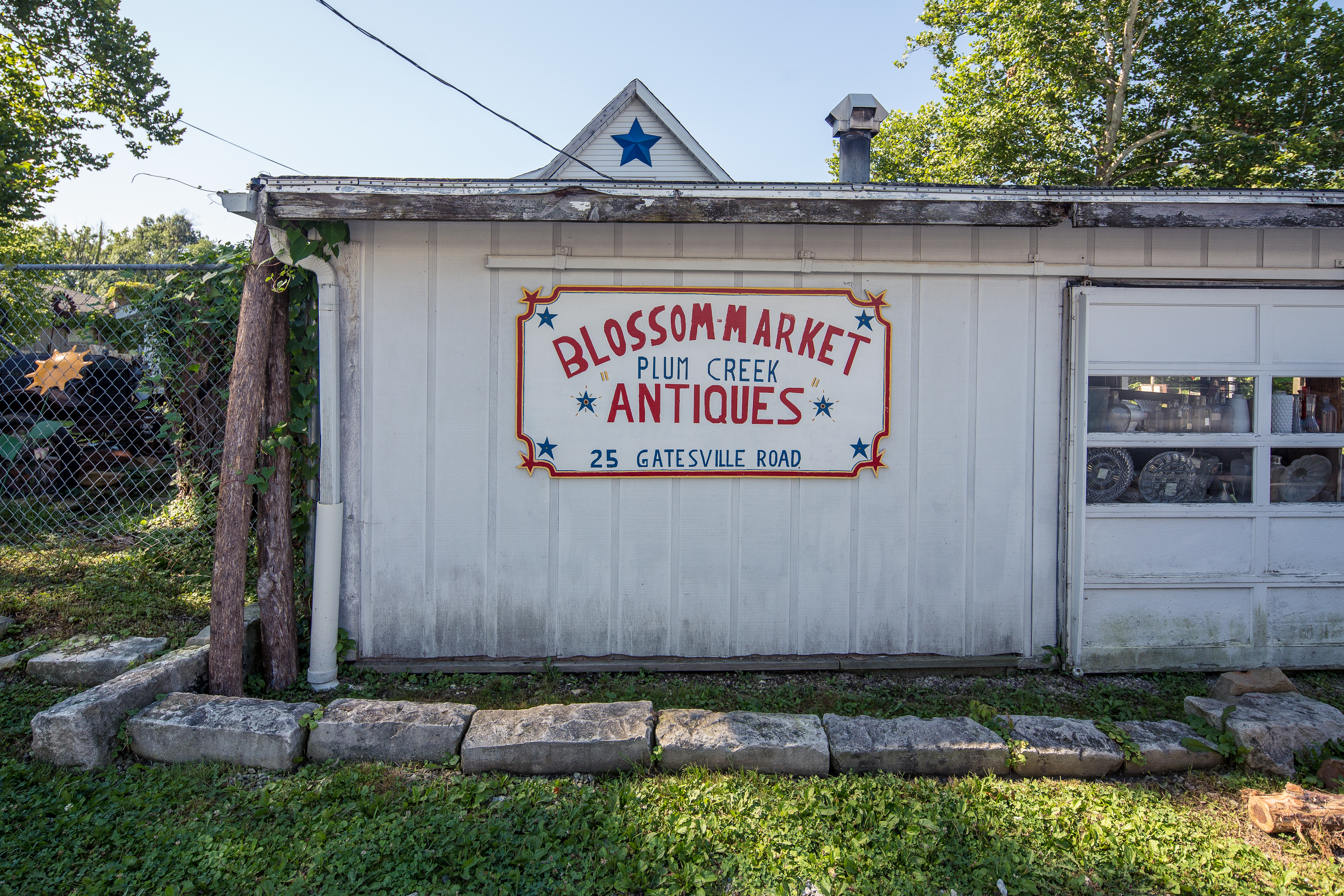

- Brown County's location in Indiana

- Location in Brown County
- Coordinates: 39°16′01″N 86°14′57″W
- Country: United States
- State: Indiana
- County: Brown
- Township: Jackson
- Elevation: 738 ft (225 m)
- Time zone: UTC-5 (Eastern (EST))
  - Summer (DST): UTC-4 (EDT)
- ZIP code: 46160
- Area codes: 812 & 930
- FIPS code: 18-03790
- GNIS feature ID: 430609

Beanblossom, also spelled Bean Blossom, is an unincorporated community in Jackson Township, Brown County, in the U.S. state of Indiana. The town was named for the nearby Beanblossom Creek, which was in turn named for a person whose surname was Beanblossom.

== History ==
Beanblossom was originally called Georgetown, for George Grove who ran a grist mill in the area and under the latter name was founded in 1833. The first post office in the community was established as Bean Blossom in 1842; the post office was discontinued in 1911.

== Geography ==
Beanblossom is located about four miles (6 km) north of Nashville at the intersection of state roads 45 and 135. The closest town to Beanblossom is Helmsburg, approximately two miles west.

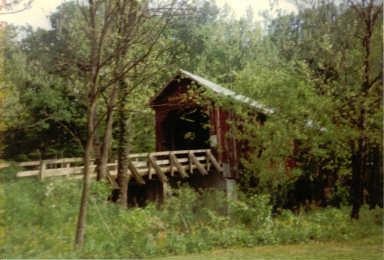
The Beanblossom Covered Bridge

== Culture ==
Bean Blossom is best known as the home of the Bill Monroe Memorial Music Park and Campground, a 55-acre (220,000 m^{2}) wooded campground which for more than 60 years has hosted music performances (mostly country and bluegrass), first at the Brown County Jamboree barn and currently at outdoor stages. A bluegrass festival (currently called the Bill Monroe Memorial Festival) has been held every June since 1967 and is the longest continuously running bluegrass festival in the world.
