= Mount Liberty, Indiana =

- Unincorporated community
- Brown County's location in Indiana

- Location in Brown County
- Coordinates: 39°11′03″N 86°07′49″W
- Country: United States
- State: Indiana
- County: Brown
- Township: Washington
- Elevation: 682 ft (208 m)
- Time zone: UTC-5 (Eastern (EST))
  - Summer (DST): UTC-4 (EDT)
- ZIP code: 47448
- Area codes: 812 & 930
- FIPS code: 18-51455
- GNIS feature ID: 439597

Mount Liberty is an unincorporated community in Washington Township, Brown County, in the U.S. state of Indiana.

== History ==
A post office was established at Mount Liberty in 1856, and remained in operation until it was discontinued in 1932.
