= Brown County Bridge No. 36 =

- U.S. National Register of Historic Places
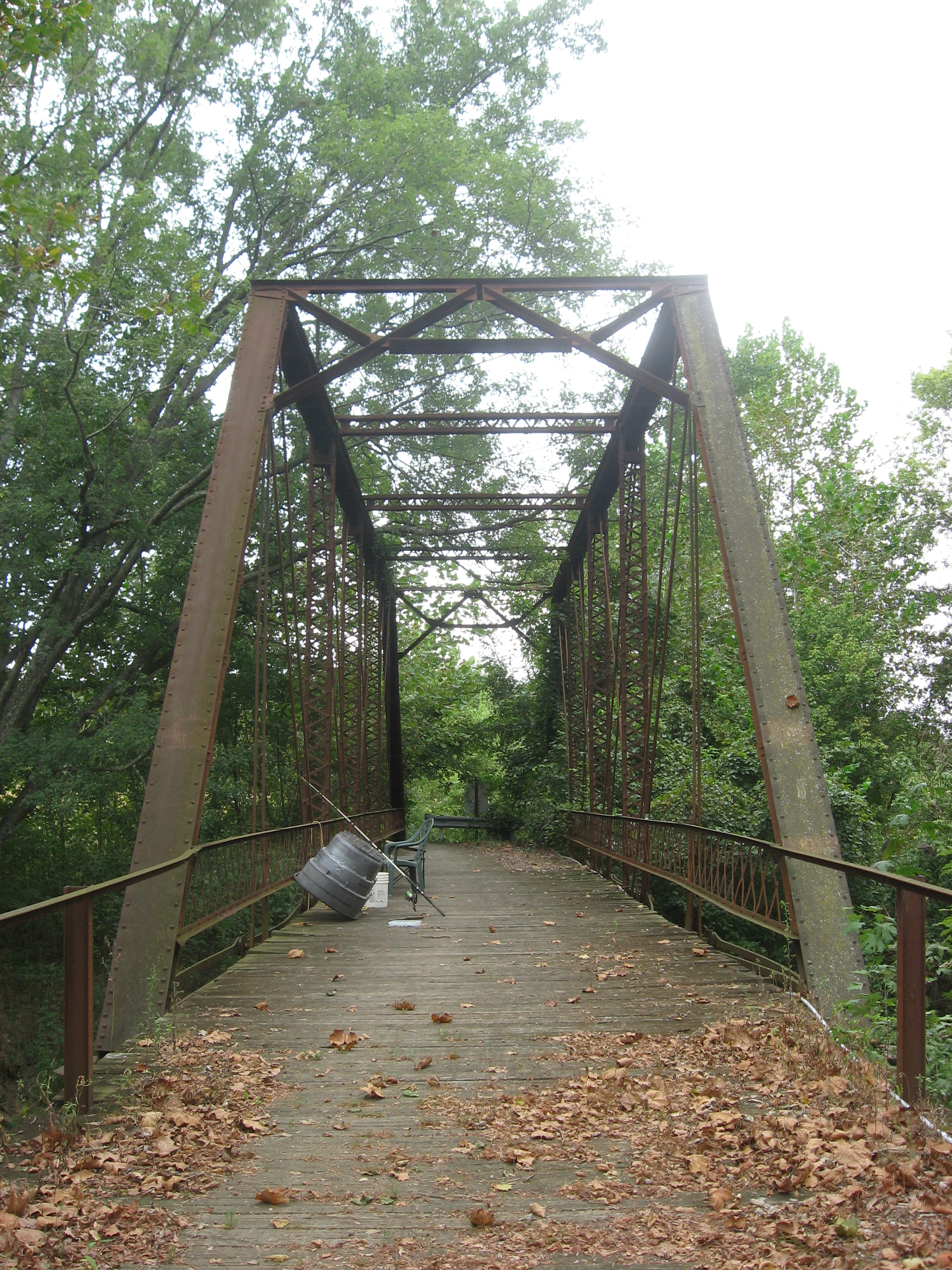
- Brown County Bridge No. 36, September 2010

- Location within Brown County, Indiana Location within Indiana Location within the United States
- Location: Hickory Hill Rd. across the North Fork of Salt Creek, southwest of Nashville, Washington Township, Brown County, Indiana
- Coordinates: 39°10′59″N 86°18′12″W
- Area: less than one acre
- Built: 1908
- Built by: Pan-American Bridge Company
- Architectural style: Pratt Through Truss
- NRHP reference No.: 93001430
- Added to NRHP: December 21, 1993

Brown County Bridge No. 36, also known as Hickory Hill Road Bridge and Wrightsman Bridge, is a historic Pratt through truss bridge located at Washington Township, Brown County, Indiana. It was built by the Pan-American Bridge Company in 1908. It consists of a 90 foot long span and 31 foot, 9 inch, span. It was closed to vehicular traffic in November 1990, but remains open to foot traffic on the Ten O'Clock Treaty Line Trail.

It was listed on the National Register of Historic Places in 1993.
