= Tecumseh Trail =

- Location within Indiana
- Nearest city: Martinsville (north), Bloomington (south)
- Coordinates: 39°19′33″N 86°25′12″W
- Established: 1998
- Governing body: Hoosier Hikers Council

Tecumseh Trail
- Length: 42 m (138 ft)
- Location: Indiana
- Use: hiking, backpacking, trail running
- Difficulty: Moderate
- Season: Hiking All
- Hazards: Ticks
- Website: http://www.hoosierhikerscouncil.org/tecumseh-trail/

Built by the Hoosier Hikers Council in 1998–2002, the Tecumseh Trail begins at Morgan-Monroe State Forest Headquarters, which is about 5 miles south of Martinsville. It ends in a remote area of Brown County forest near Monroe Lake, just south of SR 46 near Crooked Creek Road.

== Hiking the trail ==
In terms of hills, the Tecumseh Trail is often considered a gentler version and training ground of the Knobstone Trail, a 52-mile one-way path that is further south in Indiana, near the city of Salem. While the Tecumseh's path does consist of many large hills, ascents are not typically as steep, long, or frequent as those of the Knobstone Trail.

The logistics of backpacking the Tecumseh can sometimes have more challenges. While the Tecumseh Trail tends to offer many opportunities for backcountry (non-potable) water sources, it often has less parking or allowable camping areas than the Knobstone Trail. This can impact the number of miles necessary to hike in a day, and it is for this reason that all trips should be carefully planned ahead of time.
