= Washington Township, Brown County, Indiana =

Washington Township
- Township
- Location of Washington Township in Brown County
- Coordinates: 39°10′03″N 86°15′48″W
- Country: United States
- State: Indiana
- County: Brown

Government
  - Type: Indiana township

Area
  - Total: 102 sq mi (260 km^{2})
  - Land: 99.42 sq mi (257.5 km^{2})
  - Water: 2.58 sq mi (6.7 km^{2})
- Elevation: 750 ft (230 m)

Population (2020)
  - Total: 5,164
  - Density: 51.94/sq mi (20.05/km^{2})
- FIPS code: 18-80396
- GNIS feature ID: 453984

Washington Township is one of four townships in Brown County, Indiana. As of the 2020 census, its population was 5,164 and it contained 2,753 housing units. The township includes the northern portion of Brown County State Park.

Historical population
Census	Pop.	Note	%±
1890	2,975		—
1900	2,713		−8.8%
1910	2,187		−19.4%
1920	1,803		−17.6%
1930	1,581		−12.3%
1940	2,026		28.1%
1950	2,227		9.9%
1960	2,603		16.9%
1970	3,442		32.2%
1980	4,031		17.1%
1990	4,478		11.1%
2000	4,433		−1.0%
2010	4,896		10.4%
2020	5,164		5.5%
Source: US Decennial Census

== History ==
Washington Township was established in 1836.

The Brown County Bridge No. 36 and Theodore Clement Steele House and Studio are listed on the National Register of Historic Places.

== Geography ==
According to the 2010 census, the township has a total area of 102 square miles (260 km^{2}), of which 99.42 square miles (257.5 km^{2}) (or 97.47%) is land and 2.58 square miles (6.7 km^{2}) (or 2.53%) is water. Axsom Branch Pond and Terrill Ridge Pond are in this township.

=== Cities and towns ===
- Nashville

=== Unincorporated towns ===
- Annandale Estates
- Belmont
- Gnaw Bone
- Mount Liberty
- Town Hill
- West Overlook

(This list is based on USGS data and may include former settlements.)

=== Adjacent townships ===
- Hamblen (northeast)
- Jackson (north)
- Van Buren (southeast)
- Benton Township, Monroe County (northwest)
- Camp Atterbury (northeast)
- Harrison Township, Bartholomew County (east)
- Polk Township, Monroe County (southwest)
- Salt Creek Township, Jackson County (south)
- Salt Creek Township, Monroe County (west)

=== Major highways ===
- Indiana State Road 46
- Indiana State Road 135

=== Cemeteries ===
The township contains eight cemeteries: Clark, Crouch, David, Dobbs, Hickory Hill, Marlett, Pittman, South View, and Terrill.
