= Van Buren Township, Brown County, Indiana =

Van Buren Township
- Township
- Location of Van Buren Township in Brown County
- Coordinates: 39°05′40″N 86°10′27″W
- Country: United States
- State: Indiana
- County: Brown

Government
  - Type: Indiana township

Area
  - Total: 87.33 sq mi (226.2 km^{2})
  - Land: 87.2 sq mi (226 km^{2})
  - Water: 0.13 sq mi (0.34 km^{2})
- Elevation: 692 ft (211 m)

Population (2020)
  - Total: 1,908
  - Density: 21.9/sq mi (8.45/km^{2})
- FIPS code: 18-78398
- GNIS feature ID: 453942

Van Buren Township is one of four townships in Brown County, Indiana. As of the 2020 census, its population was 1,903 and it contained 888 housing units. The township includes the southern portion of Brown County State Park.

Historical population
Census	Pop.	Note	%±
1890	2,297		—
1900	1,956		−14.8%
1910	1,647		−15.8%
1920	1,321		−19.8%
1930	837		−36.6%
1940	1,018		21.6%
1950	883		−13.3%
1960	822		−6.9%
1970	950		15.6%
1980	1,207		27.1%
1990	1,419		17.6%
2000	1,782		25.6%
2010	2,008		12.7%
2020	1,903		−5.2%
Source: US Decennial Census

== History ==
Van Buren Township was established in 1836. It is named for Martin Van Buren, eighth President of the United States.

In 1892, a church later known as Grandview Apostolic Church was built along Grandview Ridge Road, on the eastern edge of Van Buren Township. It was added to the National Register of Historic Places in 1991, but after it was arsoned on July 14, 2010, it was removed from the Register.

The Thomas A. Hendricks House and Stone Head Road Marker at Stone Head was listed on the National Register of Historic Places in 1984.

== Geography ==
According to the 2010 census, the township has a total area of 87.33 square miles (226.2 km^{2}), of which 87.2 square miles (226 km^{2}) (or 99.85%) is land and 0.13 square miles (0.34 km^{2}) (or 0.15%) is water. Black Oak Pond, Meyer Pond and Treaty Line Pond are in this township.

=== Unincorporated towns ===
- Becks Grove
- Christiansburg
- Elkinsville
- Lake on the Green
- Pikes Peak
- Spurgeons Corner
- Stone Head
- Story

(This list is based on USGS data and may include former settlements.)

=== Adjacent townships ===
- Washington (northwest)
- Harrison Township, Bartholomew County (northeast)
- Jackson Township, Bartholomew County (east)
- Ohio Township, Bartholomew County (east)
- Pershing Township, Jackson County (southeast)
- Salt Creek Township, Jackson County (southwest)

=== Major highways ===
- Indiana State Road 135

=== Cemeteries ===
The township contains eleven cemeteries: Beck' Grove, Bellsville, Cain, Christiansburg, Elkinsville, McKinney, Moffitt, Mt. Zion, Phillips, Reeves and Spiker.
