= Jackson Township, Brown County, Indiana =

Jackson Township
- Township
- Location of Jackson Township in Brown County
- Coordinates: 39°17′01″N 86°18′03″W
- Country: United States
- State: Indiana
- County: Brown

Government
  - Type: Indiana township

Area
  - Total: 62.38 sq mi (161.6 km^{2})
  - Land: 61.39 sq mi (159.0 km^{2})
  - Water: 0.99 sq mi (2.6 km^{2})
- Elevation: 702 ft (214 m)

Population (2020)
  - Total: 3,938
  - Density: 64.15/sq mi (24.77/km^{2})
- FIPS code: 18-36810
- GNIS feature ID: 453433

Jackson Township is one of four townships in Brown County, Indiana. As of the 2020 census, its population was 3,938 (down from 4,002 at 2010) and it contained 2,154 housing units.

Historical population
Census	Pop.	Note	%±
1890	2,012		—
1900	1,943		−3.4%
1910	1,642		−15.5%
1920	1,712		4.3%
1930	1,326		−22.5%
1940	1,441		8.7%
1950	1,519		5.4%
1960	1,946		28.1%
1970	2,658		36.6%
1980	3,774		42.0%
1990	4,151		10.0%
2000	4,151		0.0%
2010	4,002		−3.6%
2020	3,938		−1.6%
Source: US Decennial Census

== History ==
Jackson Township was named for Andrew Jackson.

== Geography ==
According to the 2010 census, the township has a total area of 62.38 square miles (161.6 km^{2}), of which 61.39 square miles (159.0 km^{2}) (or 98.41%) is land and 0.99 square miles (2.6 km^{2}) (or 1.59%) is water.

=== Unincorporated towns ===
- Beanblossom
- Bear Wallow
- Cornelius
- Fruitdale
- Helmsburg
- Needmore
- Trevlac

(This list is based on USGS data and may include former settlements.)

=== Adjacent townships ===
- Hamblen (east)
- Washington (south)
- Benton Township, Monroe County (west)
- Hensley Township, Johnson County (northeast)
- Washington Township, Morgan County (northwest)

=== Major highways ===
- Indiana State Road 45
- Indiana State Road 135

=== Cemeteries ===
The township contains two cemeteries: Georgetown and Lanam.
