= Needmore, Brown County, Indiana =

Needmore
- Unincorporated community
- Brown County's location in Indiana

- Location in Brown County
- Coordinates: 39°15′04″N 86°20′23″W
- Country: United States
- State: Indiana
- County: Brown
- Township: Jackson
- Elevation: 722 ft (220 m)
- Time zone: UTC-5 (Eastern (EST))
  - Summer (DST): UTC-4 (EDT)
- ZIP code: 47448
- Area codes: 812 & 930
- FIPS code: 18-52182
- GNIS feature ID: 439974

Needmore is an unincorporated community in Jackson Township, Brown County, in the U.S. state of Indiana.

== History ==
A post office was established at Needmore in 1872, and remained in operation until it was discontinued in 1919. Tradition has it when an early visitor to the settlement remarked that it "needed more", the name stuck.

In 1884, Needmore contained a blacksmith, several stores, and a population of approximately 100 inhabitants.
