= Pikes Peak, Indiana =

- Unincorporated community
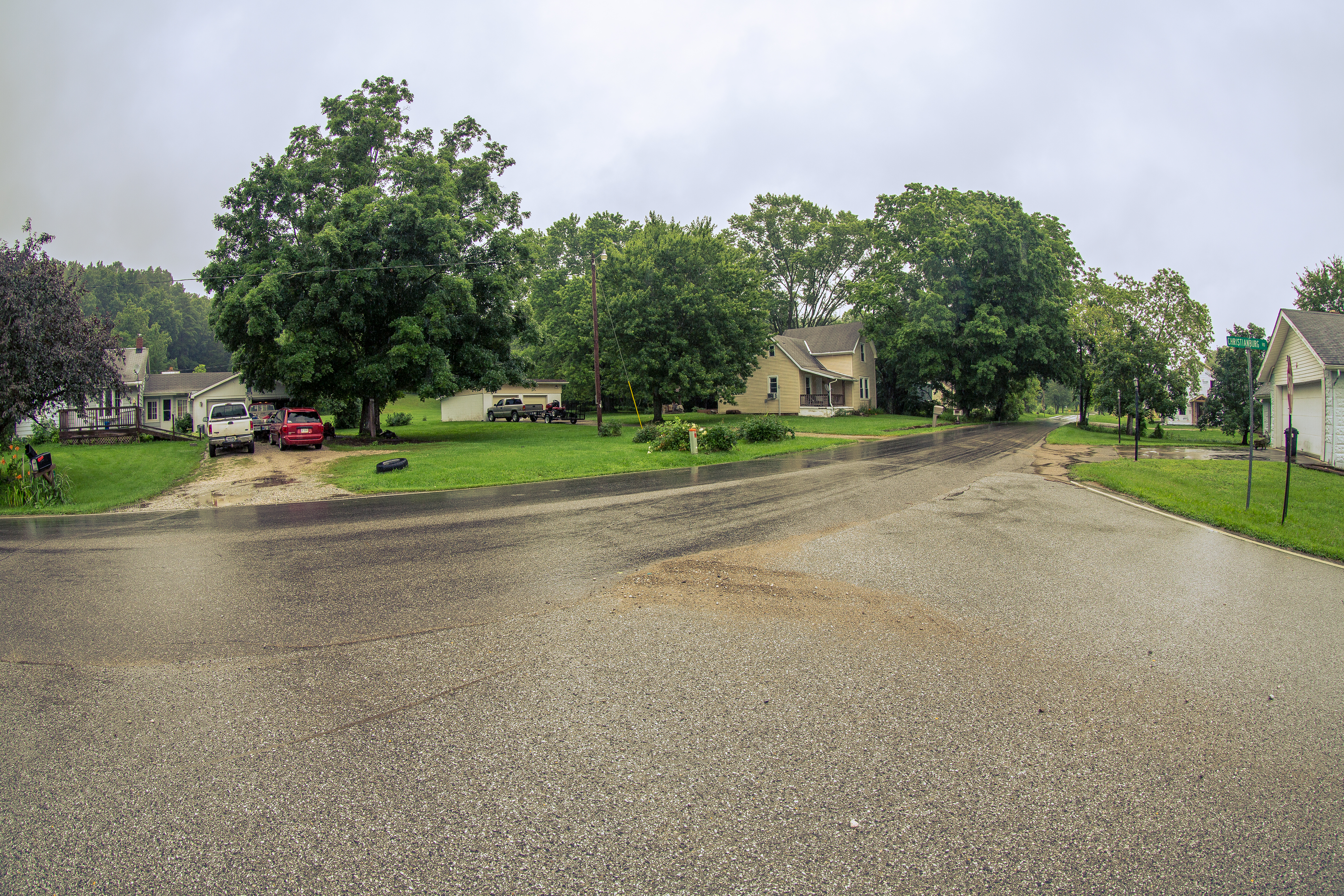

- Brown County's location in Indiana

- Location in Brown County
- Coordinates: 39°07′45″N 86°08′29″W
- Country: United States
- State: Indiana
- County: Brown
- Township: Van Buren
- Elevation: 604 ft (184 m)
- Time zone: UTC-5 (Eastern (EST))
  - Summer (DST): UTC-4 (EDT)
- ZIP code: 47448
- Area codes: 812 & 930
- FIPS code: 18-59814
- GNIS feature ID: 449710

Pikes Peak is an unincorporated community in Van Buren Township, Brown County, in the U.S. state of Indiana.

== History ==
According to legend, James Ward was intent on moving to Colorado. He wrote on the side of his conestoga wagon "Pikes Peak or Bust". Miller made it out of Columbus to the area now known as Pikes Peak. To save face he called his store Pikes Peak and the name stuck.

A post office was established at Pikes Peak in 1868, and remained in operation until it was discontinued in 1907.
