= 1952 United States presidential election in Indiana =

- November 4, 1952
- Turnout: 75.7% ▲8.5 pp

| Nominee | Dwight D. Eisenhower | Adlai Stevenson II |
| Party | Republican | Democratic |
| Home state | New York | Illinois |
| Running mate | Richard Nixon | John Sparkman |
| Electoral vote | 13 | 0 |
| Popular vote | 1,136,259 | 801,530 |
| Percentage | 58.11% | 40.99% |
County results
Eisenhower
40–50%
50–60%
60–70%
70–80%
Stevenson
40–50%
50–60%
President before election
Harry S. Truman
Democratic
Elected President
Dwight D. Eisenhower
Republican

A presidential election was held in Indiana on November 4, 1952, as part of the 1952 United States presidential election. The Republican ticket of the Supreme Allied Commander Europe Dwight D. Eisenhower and the junior U.S. senator from California Richard Nixon defeated the Democratic ticket of the governor of Illinois Adlai Stevenson II and the junior U.S. senator from Alabama John Sparkman. Eisenhower defeated Stevenson in the national election with 442 electoral votes.

== General election ==
=== Statistics ===
Eisenhower became the first Republican presidential candidate to carry Brown and Dubois counties.

=== Results ===
1952 United States presidential election in Indiana
| Party | Candidate | Votes | % | ±% |
|---|---|---|---|---|
| Republican | Dwight D. Eisenhower Richard Nixon | 1,136,259 | 58.11 | ▲8.53 |
| Democratic | Adlai Stevenson II John Sparkman | 801,530 | 40.99 | ▼7.79 |
| Prohibition | Stuart Hamblen Enoch A. Holtwick | 15,335 | 0.78 | ▼0.11 |
| Progressive | Vincent Hallinan Charlotta Bass | 1,222 | 0.16 | ▼0.42 |
| Socialist Labor | Eric Hass Stephen Emery | 979 | 0.05 | Steady |
| Total votes | | 1,955,325 | 100.00 | |

=== Results by county ===
1952 United States presidential election in Indiana by county
| County | Dwight D. Eisenhower Republican | | Adlai Stevenson Democratic | | Others | | Margin | | Total |
| County | Votes | % | Votes | % | Votes | % | Votes | % | Total |
|---|---|---|---|---|---|---|---|---|---|
| Adams | 6,204 | 59.61% | 3,744 | 35.97% | 460 | 4.42% | 2,460 | 23.64% | 10,408 |
| Allen | 54,877 | 66.16% | 27,506 | 33.16% | 558 | 0.67% | 27,371 | 33.00% | 82,941 |
| Bartholomew | 11,462 | 58.77% | 7,844 | 40.22% | 196 | 1.01% | 3,618 | 18.55% | 19,502 |
| Benton | 4,125 | 69.25% | 1,815 | 30.47% | 17 | 0.29% | 2,310 | 38.78% | 5,957 |
| Blackford | 3,759 | 53.20% | 3,144 | 44.49% | 163 | 2.31% | 615 | 8.71% | 7,066 |
| Boone | 8,619 | 63.04% | 4,986 | 36.47% | 68 | 0.50% | 3,633 | 26.57% | 13,673 |
| Brown | 1,517 | 51.18% | 1,414 | 47.71% | 33 | 1.11% | 103 | 3.47% | 2,964 |
| Carroll | 5,902 | 64.31% | 3,208 | 34.95% | 68 | 0.74% | 2,694 | 29.36% | 9,178 |
| Cass | 12,296 | 60.32% | 7,982 | 39.16% | 107 | 0.52% | 4,314 | 21.16% | 20,385 |
| Clark | 11,190 | 48.60% | 11,703 | 50.83% | 132 | 0.57% | -513 | -2.23% | 23,025 |
| Clay | 7,118 | 53.31% | 6,078 | 45.52% | 155 | 1.16% | 1,040 | 7.79% | 13,351 |
| Clinton | 10,057 | 60.14% | 6,469 | 38.68% | 198 | 1.18% | 3,588 | 21.46% | 16,724 |
| Crawford | 2,750 | 51.85% | 2,457 | 46.32% | 97 | 1.83% | 293 | 5.53% | 5,304 |
| Daviess | 8,328 | 60.89% | 5,247 | 38.37% | 101 | 0.74% | 3,081 | 22.52% | 13,676 |
| Dearborn | 7,091 | 54.82% | 5,810 | 44.92% | 33 | 0.26% | 1,281 | 9.90% | 12,934 |
| Decatur | 6,490 | 65.15% | 3,393 | 34.06% | 78 | 0.78% | 3,097 | 31.09% | 9,961 |
| DeKalb | 8,713 | 64.66% | 4,347 | 32.26% | 416 | 3.09% | 4,366 | 32.40% | 13,476 |
| Delaware | 24,272 | 55.68% | 18,733 | 42.98% | 585 | 1.34% | 5,539 | 12.70% | 43,590 |
| Dubois | 6,538 | 53.47% | 5,658 | 46.27% | 31 | 0.25% | 880 | 7.20% | 12,227 |
| Elkhart | 25,277 | 66.33% | 12,002 | 31.49% | 829 | 2.18% | 13,275 | 34.84% | 38,108 |
| Fayette | 7,000 | 57.05% | 5,178 | 42.20% | 92 | 0.75% | 1,822 | 14.85% | 12,270 |
| Floyd | 11,608 | 51.79% | 10,368 | 46.25% | 439 | 1.96% | 1,240 | 5.54% | 22,415 |
| Fountain | 6,208 | 61.35% | 3,871 | 38.25% | 40 | 0.40% | 2,337 | 23.10% | 10,119 |
| Franklin | 4,630 | 64.04% | 2,548 | 35.24% | 52 | 0.72% | 2,082 | 28.80% | 7,230 |
| Fulton | 6,247 | 68.09% | 2,799 | 30.51% | 129 | 1.41% | 3,448 | 37.58% | 9,175 |
| Gibson | 9,171 | 53.99% | 7,617 | 44.84% | 198 | 1.17% | 1,554 | 9.15% | 16,986 |
| Grant | 16,678 | 59.73% | 10,646 | 38.13% | 599 | 2.15% | 6,032 | 21.60% | 27,923 |
| Greene | 8,620 | 53.25% | 7,417 | 45.82% | 152 | 0.94% | 1,203 | 7.43% | 16,189 |
| Hamilton | 10,843 | 69.69% | 4,564 | 29.33% | 153 | 0.98% | 6,279 | 40.36% | 15,560 |
| Hancock | 6,964 | 59.94% | 4,539 | 39.07% | 116 | 1.00% | 2,425 | 20.87% | 11,619 |
| Harrison | 5,069 | 53.62% | 4,213 | 44.56% | 172 | 1.82% | 856 | 9.06% | 9,454 |
| Hendricks | 9,712 | 66.58% | 4,793 | 32.86% | 81 | 0.56% | 4,919 | 33.72% | 14,586 |
| Henry | 14,184 | 61.99% | 8,378 | 36.61% | 320 | 1.40% | 5,806 | 25.38% | 22,882 |
| Howard | 15,212 | 53.34% | 12,938 | 45.37% | 367 | 1.29% | 2,274 | 7.97% | 28,517 |
| Huntington | 10,508 | 61.98% | 6,114 | 36.06% | 331 | 1.95% | 4,394 | 25.92% | 16,953 |
| Jackson | 8,067 | 55.14% | 6,460 | 44.16% | 103 | 0.70% | 1,607 | 10.98% | 14,630 |
| Jasper | 5,556 | 72.23% | 2,102 | 27.33% | 34 | 0.44% | 3,454 | 44.90% | 7,692 |
| Jay | 7,270 | 58.96% | 4,764 | 38.63% | 297 | 2.41% | 2,506 | 20.33% | 12,331 |
| Jefferson | 6,169 | 58.90% | 4,251 | 40.59% | 53 | 0.51% | 1,918 | 18.31% | 10,473 |
| Jennings | 4,460 | 61.21% | 2,777 | 38.11% | 49 | 0.67% | 1,683 | 23.10% | 7,286 |
| Johnson | 9,119 | 60.46% | 5,909 | 39.18% | 54 | 0.36% | 3,210 | 21.28% | 15,082 |
| Knox | 12,786 | 57.30% | 9,384 | 42.05% | 146 | 0.65% | 3,402 | 15.25% | 22,316 |
| Kosciusko | 11,521 | 68.95% | 4,677 | 27.99% | 512 | 3.06% | 6,844 | 40.96% | 16,710 |
| LaGrange | 3,822 | 68.80% | 1,604 | 28.87% | 129 | 2.32% | 2,218 | 39.93% | 5,555 |
| Lake | 74,073 | 44.66% | 90,721 | 54.70% | 1,051 | 0.63% | -16,648 | -10.04% | 165,845 |
| LaPorte | 22,576 | 59.83% | 15,011 | 39.78% | 146 | 0.39% | 7,565 | 20.05% | 37,733 |
| Lawrence | 11,296 | 64.64% | 6,044 | 34.59% | 135 | 0.77% | 5,252 | 30.05% | 17,475 |
| Madison | 28,730 | 52.84% | 25,125 | 46.21% | 519 | 0.95% | 3,605 | 6.63% | 54,374 |
| Marion | 164,466 | 60.48% | 106,387 | 39.12% | 1,086 | 0.40% | 58,079 | 21.36% | 271,939 |
| Marshall | 9,990 | 63.12% | 5,538 | 34.99% | 300 | 1.90% | 4,452 | 28.13% | 15,828 |
| Martin | 2,757 | 51.71% | 2,546 | 47.75% | 29 | 0.54% | 211 | 3.96% | 5,332 |
| Miami | 9,254 | 58.97% | 6,264 | 39.91% | 176 | 1.12% | 2,990 | 19.06% | 15,694 |
| Monroe | 12,072 | 60.59% | 7,745 | 38.87% | 108 | 0.54% | 4,327 | 21.72% | 19,925 |
| Montgomery | 10,569 | 65.89% | 5,386 | 33.58% | 86 | 0.54% | 5,183 | 32.31% | 16,041 |
| Morgan | 8,222 | 62.90% | 4,755 | 36.38% | 95 | 0.73% | 3,467 | 26.52% | 13,072 |
| Newton | 4,159 | 74.79% | 1,373 | 24.69% | 29 | 0.52% | 2,786 | 50.10% | 5,561 |
| Noble | 8,203 | 65.39% | 4,151 | 33.09% | 190 | 1.51% | 4,052 | 32.30% | 12,544 |
| Ohio | 1,219 | 51.92% | 1,119 | 47.66% | 10 | 0.43% | 100 | 4.26% | 2,348 |
| Orange | 5,551 | 62.38% | 3,272 | 36.77% | 75 | 0.84% | 2,279 | 25.61% | 8,898 |
| Owen | 3,713 | 58.37% | 2,577 | 40.51% | 71 | 1.12% | 1,136 | 17.86% | 6,361 |
| Parke | 5,069 | 58.33% | 3,574 | 41.13% | 47 | 0.54% | 1,495 | 17.20% | 8,690 |
| Perry | 4,816 | 54.53% | 4,001 | 45.30% | 15 | 0.17% | 815 | 9.23% | 8,832 |
| Pike | 4,253 | 54.26% | 3,478 | 44.37% | 107 | 1.37% | 775 | 9.89% | 7,838 |
| Porter | 13,194 | 68.75% | 5,909 | 30.79% | 87 | 0.45% | 7,285 | 37.96% | 19,190 |
| Posey | 5,293 | 57.61% | 3,835 | 41.74% | 59 | 0.64% | 1,458 | 15.87% | 9,187 |
| Pulaski | 4,030 | 63.10% | 2,244 | 35.13% | 113 | 1.77% | 1,786 | 27.97% | 6,387 |
| Putnam | 6,632 | 59.65% | 4,446 | 39.99% | 40 | 0.36% | 2,186 | 19.66% | 11,118 |
| Randolph | 9,150 | 65.42% | 4,461 | 31.90% | 375 | 2.68% | 4,689 | 33.52% | 13,986 |
| Ripley | 6,650 | 62.00% | 4,031 | 37.59% | 44 | 0.41% | 2,619 | 24.41% | 10,725 |
| Rush | 6,918 | 66.82% | 3,348 | 32.34% | 87 | 0.84% | 3,570 | 34.48% | 10,353 |
| St. Joseph | 53,537 | 49.74% | 53,269 | 49.49% | 826 | 0.77% | 268 | 0.25% | 107,632 |
| Scott | 2,984 | 50.08% | 2,931 | 49.19% | 44 | 0.74% | 53 | 0.89% | 5,959 |
| Shelby | 8,961 | 57.18% | 6,552 | 41.81% | 158 | 1.01% | 2,409 | 15.37% | 15,671 |
| Spencer | 5,497 | 61.48% | 3,401 | 38.04% | 43 | 0.48% | 2,096 | 23.44% | 8,941 |
| Starke | 4,871 | 59.43% | 3,274 | 39.95% | 51 | 0.62% | 1,597 | 19.48% | 8,196 |
| Steuben | 5,322 | 73.02% | 1,886 | 25.88% | 80 | 1.10% | 3,436 | 47.14% | 7,288 |
| Sullivan | 5,929 | 45.65% | 6,964 | 53.62% | 95 | 0.73% | -1,035 | -7.97% | 12,988 |
| Switzerland | 2,070 | 48.42% | 2,167 | 50.69% | 38 | 0.89% | -97 | -2.27% | 4,275 |
| Tippecanoe | 23,447 | 70.53% | 9,678 | 29.11% | 121 | 0.36% | 13,769 | 41.42% | 33,246 |
| Tipton | 5,299 | 60.59% | 3,362 | 38.44% | 84 | 0.96% | 1,937 | 22.15% | 8,745 |
| Union | 2,159 | 67.24% | 1,029 | 32.05% | 23 | 0.72% | 1,130 | 35.19% | 3,211 |
| Vanderburgh | 42,010 | 58.20% | 29,718 | 41.17% | 459 | 0.64% | 12,292 | 17.03% | 72,187 |
| Vermillion | 5,283 | 47.84% | 5,708 | 51.69% | 52 | 0.47% | -425 | -3.85% | 11,043 |
| Vigo | 25,806 | 49.74% | 25,841 | 49.81% | 231 | 0.45% | -35 | -0.07% | 51,878 |
| Wabash | 9,980 | 67.94% | 4,395 | 29.92% | 315 | 2.14% | 5,585 | 38.02% | 14,690 |
| Warren | 3,191 | 70.16% | 1,332 | 29.29% | 25 | 0.55% | 1,859 | 40.87% | 4,548 |
| Warrick | 6,064 | 56.35% | 4,639 | 43.11% | 59 | 0.55% | 1,425 | 13.24% | 10,762 |
| Washington | 4,849 | 55.45% | 3,844 | 43.96% | 52 | 0.59% | 1,005 | 11.49% | 8,745 |
| Wayne | 20,068 | 62.36% | 11,819 | 36.73% | 293 | 0.91% | 8,249 | 25.63% | 32,180 |
| Wells | 5,380 | 55.85% | 3,963 | 41.14% | 290 | 3.01% | 1,417 | 14.71% | 9,633 |
| White | 6,795 | 67.60% | 3,211 | 31.94% | 46 | 0.46% | 3,584 | 35.66% | 10,052 |
| Whitley | 5,893 | 60.28% | 3,755 | 38.41% | 128 | 1.31% | 2,138 | 21.87% | 9,776 |
| TOTAL | 1,136,259 | 58.11% | 801,530 | 40.99% | 17,536 | 0.90% | 334,729 | 17.12% | 1,955,325 |

==== Counties that flipped from Democratic to Republican ====
- Bartholomew
- Brown
- Blackford
- Crawford
- Cass
- Clay
- Clinton
- Delaware
- Dearborn
- Dubois
- Fayette
- Floyd
- Gibson
- Greene
- Hancock
- Harrison
- Howard
- Jackson
- Johnson
- Knox
- Madison
- Martin
- Ohio
- Perry
- Posey
- St. Joseph
- Vanderburgh
- Scott
- Shelby
- Warrick
- Washington
- Wells

== See also ==
- United States presidential elections in Indiana

== Bibliography ==
- Madison, James H. (1986). The Indiana Way: A State History. Bloomington: Indiana University Press.
- Menendez, Albert J. (2009). The Geography of Presidential Elections in the United States, 1868–2004. Jefferson, NC: McFarland and Company.
- Parker, Crawford F. (1952). Annual Election Report of the Secretary of State of the State of Indiana: 1952 General Election Statistics. Indianapolis: Indiana Secretary of State.
- Petersen, Svend (1963). A Statistical History of the American Presidential Elections. New York: Frederick Ungar Publishing Company. LCCN 62-21786.
- Sabato, Larry J.; Ernst, Howard R. (2007). Encyclopedia of American Political Parties and Elections. New York: Fact on File.
