= Gnaw Bone, Indiana =

- Unincorporated community
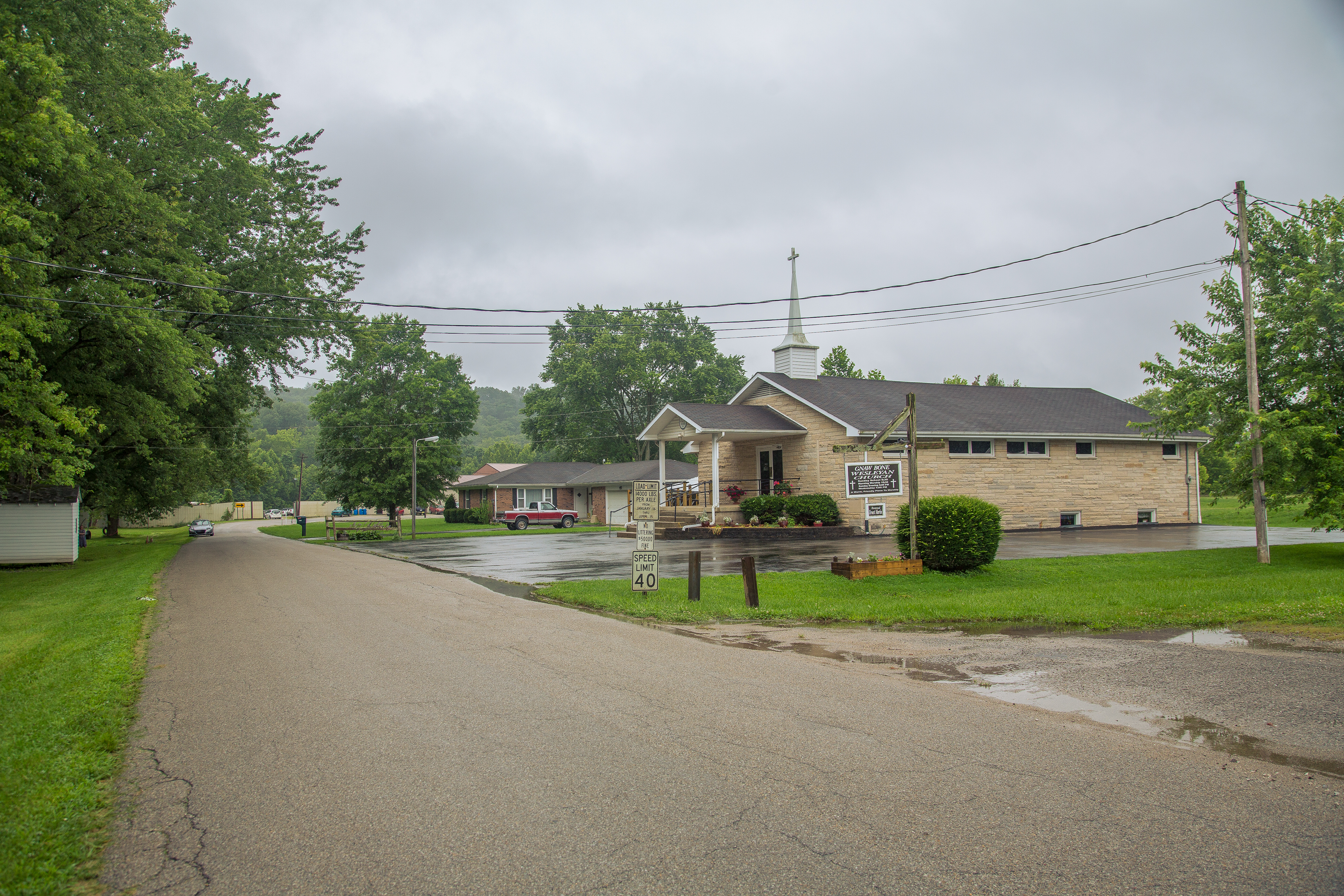

- Brown County's location in Indiana

- Location in Brown County
- Coordinates: 39°11′27″N 86°09′20″W
- Country: United States
- State: Indiana
- County: Brown
- Township: Washington
- Elevation: 643 ft (196 m)

Population (2000)
  - Total: c. 200
- Time zone: UTC-5 (Eastern (EST))
  - Summer (DST): UTC-4 (EDT)
- ZIP codes: 47448
- Area codes: 812 & 930
- GNIS feature ID: 452046

Gnaw Bone is an unincorporated community in Washington Township, Brown County, in the U.S. state of Indiana. Gnaw Bone is situated on State Highway 46, between Nashville and Columbus. The small community contains three flea markets.

== Origin of name ==
The origin of the name Gnaw Bone is obscure. One theory is that the town's name derives from that of the original French settlement in the area, Narbonne, named in turn for the southern French city of that name. To the ears of English settlers at the time, "Narbonne" sounded like and came to be known as "Gnaw Bone."

The name was in common use as early as 1879, as shown by newspaper articles in the Columbus (Indiana) Republic and the Cincinnati (Ohio) Enquirer, as well as numerous other newspapers articles up to the current year.

Gnaw Bone has frequently been noted on lists of unusual place names.
