= Spearsville, Indiana =

- Unincorporated community
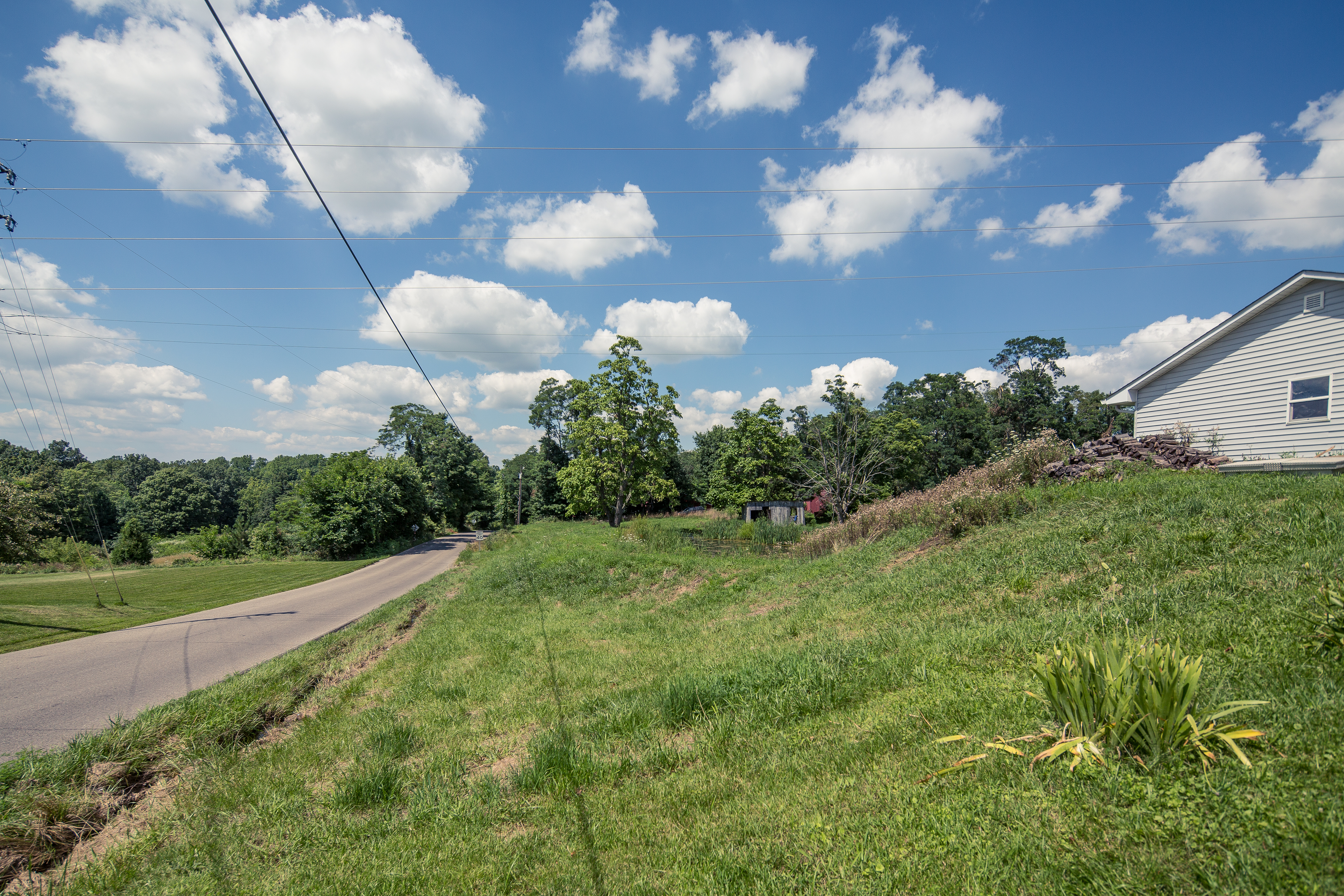

- Brown County's location in Indiana

- Location in Brown County
- Coordinates: 39°19′50″N 86°11′47″W
- Country: United States
- State: Indiana
- County: Brown
- Township: Hamblen
- Elevation: 968 ft (295 m)
- Time zone: UTC-5 (Eastern (EST))
  - Summer (DST): UTC-4 (EDT)
- ZIP code: 46160
- Area codes: 812 & 930
- FIPS code: 18-71792
- GNIS feature ID: 443925

Spearsville is an unincorporated community in Hamblen Township, Brown County, in the U.S. state of Indiana.

== History ==
Spearsville was founded in about 1835. It was named for its founder, William Spears. A post office was established at Spearsville in 1855, and remained in operation until it was discontinued in 1907.
