= Story Monument =

- Artist: William Galloway (sculptor)
- Year: 1993
- Type: Limestone
- Dimensions: 1,316.1 cm × 271.0 cm × 271.0 cm (518.16 in × 106.68 in × 106.68 in)
- Location: Story, Indiana; 39°5′55.51″N 86°12′48.98″W
- Owner: Story Inn

Story Monument is a public artwork by American artist William Galloway, located at the intersection of State Road 135 South and Elkinsville Road in Story, Indiana, United States. Story Monument was originally surveyed as part of the Smithsonian's Save Outdoor Sculpture! survey in 1993. The monument is a tribute to the economy of Story.

== Description ==
The monument is carved to look like a tree trunk with its limbs cut off. The sculpture is carved with images of a wagon wheel, a deer, a dogwood tree and vine.

== Information ==
The sculpture was built to represent, according to Save Outdoor Sculpture!, "the economic decline of Story in the 1930s, and its subsequent rebirth in the late 1970s." The carving of the wagon wheel represents the Studebaker buggy assembly operation that was located in Story in the 1920s. (Studebaker's main South Bend factory ceased making horse-drawn vehicles in 1919.) It took a number of years for artist William Galloway to complete. He worked on it while his parents owned the Story Inn.

== Condition ==
This sculpture, which was incomplete at survey in 1993, was described as "well maintained."
