= Trevlac, Indiana =

- Unincorporated community
- Brown County's location in Indiana

- Location in Brown County
- Coordinates: 39°15′56″N 86°20′13″W
- Country: United States
- State: Indiana
- County: Brown
- Township: Jackson
- Elevation: 643 ft (196 m)
- Time zone: UTC-5 (Eastern (EST))
  - Summer (DST): UTC-4 (EDT)
- ZIP code: 47448
- Area codes: 812 & 930
- FIPS code: 18-76472
- GNIS feature ID: 444872

Trevlac is an unincorporated community in Jackson Township, Brown County, in the U.S. state of Indiana. The Trevlac Bluffs Nature Preserve, a privately owned and administered reserve, lies to the east and south of the town.

== History ==
Trevlac was the name of Colonel Calvert, reversed. A post office was established at Trevlac in 1907. But there was already a Calvert, Indiana, so the Post Office said a different name would be needed. It remained in operation until it was discontinued in 1966.
