= Gatesville, Indiana =

- Unincorporated community
- Brown County's location in Indiana

- Location in Brown County
- Coordinates: 39°15′42″N 86°08′47″W
- Country: United States
- State: Indiana
- County: Brown
- Township: Hamblen
- Elevation: 656 ft (200 m)
- Time zone: UTC-5 (Eastern (EST))
  - Summer (DST): UTC-4 (EDT)
- ZIP code: 47448
- Area codes: 812 & 930
- FIPS code: 18-27115
- GNIS feature ID: 434995

Gatesville is an unincorporated community in Hamblen Township, Brown County, in the U.S. state of Indiana.

== History ==
The only post office in the history of Gatesville was called Cleona. It was established in 1855, and remained in operation until it was discontinued in 1903.
