= Hamblen Township, Brown County, Indiana =

Hamblen Township
- Township
- Location of Hamblen Township in Brown County
- Coordinates: 39°16′58″N 86°09′34″W
- Country: United States
- State: Indiana
- County: Brown

Government
  - Type: Indiana township

Area
  - Total: 64.92 sq mi (168.1 km^{2})
  - Land: 63.97 sq mi (165.7 km^{2})
  - Water: 0.95 sq mi (2.5 km^{2})
- Elevation: 840 ft (256 m)

Population (2020)
  - Total: 4,470
  - Density: 69.9/sq mi (27.0/km^{2})
- Time zone: UTC-5 (Eastern (EST))
  - Summer (DST): UTC-4 (EDT)
- Area codes: 812 & 930
- FIPS code: 18-30528
- GNIS feature ID: 453363

Hamblen Township is one of four townships in Brown County, Indiana. As of the 2020 census, its population was 4,470 (up from 4,336 at 2010) and it contained 2,641 housing units.

Historical population
Census	Pop.	Note	%±
1890	1,959		—
1900	1,923		−1.8%
1910	1,524		−20.7%
1920	1,331		−12.7%
1930	932		−30.0%
1940	1,184		27.0%
1950	1,228		3.7%
1960	1,398		13.8%
1970	2,007		43.6%
1980	3,365		67.7%
1990	4,032		19.8%
2000	4,591		13.9%
2010	4,336		−5.6%
2020	4,470		3.1%
Source: US Decennial Census

== History ==
Hamblen Township was named for Job Hamblen, a pioneer settler.

== Geography ==
According to the 2010 census, the township has a total area of 64.92 square miles (168.1 km^{2}), of which 63.97 square miles (165.7 km^{2}) (or 98.54%) is land and 0.95 square miles (2.5 km^{2}) (or 1.46%) is water.

=== Unincorporated towns ===
- Cordry Sweetwater Lakes (census-designated place)
- Gatesville
- Peoga (partial)
- Spearsville
- Sprunica, Indiana
- Taggart

(This list is based on USGS data and may include former settlements.)

=== Adjacent townships ===
- Jackson (west)
- Washington (southwest)
- Camp Atterbury (east)
- Hensley Township, Johnson County (north)
- Nineveh Township, Johnson County (northeast)

=== Cemeteries ===
The township contains six cemeteries: Anderson, Calvin, Duncan, Mount Moriah, Taylor and Zion Church.
