= Christiansburg, Indiana =

- Unincorporated community
- Brown County's location in Indiana

- Location in Brown County
- Coordinates: 39°05′19″N 86°09′22″W
- Country: United States
- State: Indiana
- County: Brown
- Township: Van Buren
- Elevation: 604 ft (184 m)
- Time zone: UTC-5 (Eastern (EST))
  - Summer (DST): UTC-4 (EDT)
- ZIP code: 47201
- Area codes: 812 & 930
- FIPS code: 18-12592
- GNIS feature ID: 450775

Christiansburg is an unincorporated community in Van Buren Township, Brown County, in the U.S. state of Indiana.

== History ==
Christiansburg was founded about 1850. It may have been named for Col. William Christian. The Christiansburg post office was discontinued in 1902.
