= Fruitdale, Indiana =

- Unincorporated community
- Brown County's location in Indiana

- Location in Brown County
- Coordinates: 39°19′19″N 86°15′28″W
- Country: United States
- State: Indiana
- County: Brown
- Township: Jackson
- Elevation: 843 ft (257 m)
- Time zone: UTC-5 (Eastern (EST))
  - Summer (DST): UTC-4 (EDT)
- ZIP code: 46160
- Area codes: 812 & 930
- FIPS code: 18-26080
- GNIS feature ID: 434882

Fruitdale is an unincorporated community in Jackson Township, Brown County, in the U.S. state of Indiana.

== History ==
A post office was established at Fruitdale in 1909, and remained in operation until 1937. The community was likely named from fruit orchards nearby.
