= Yellowwood State Forest =

State forest in Indiana, U.S.

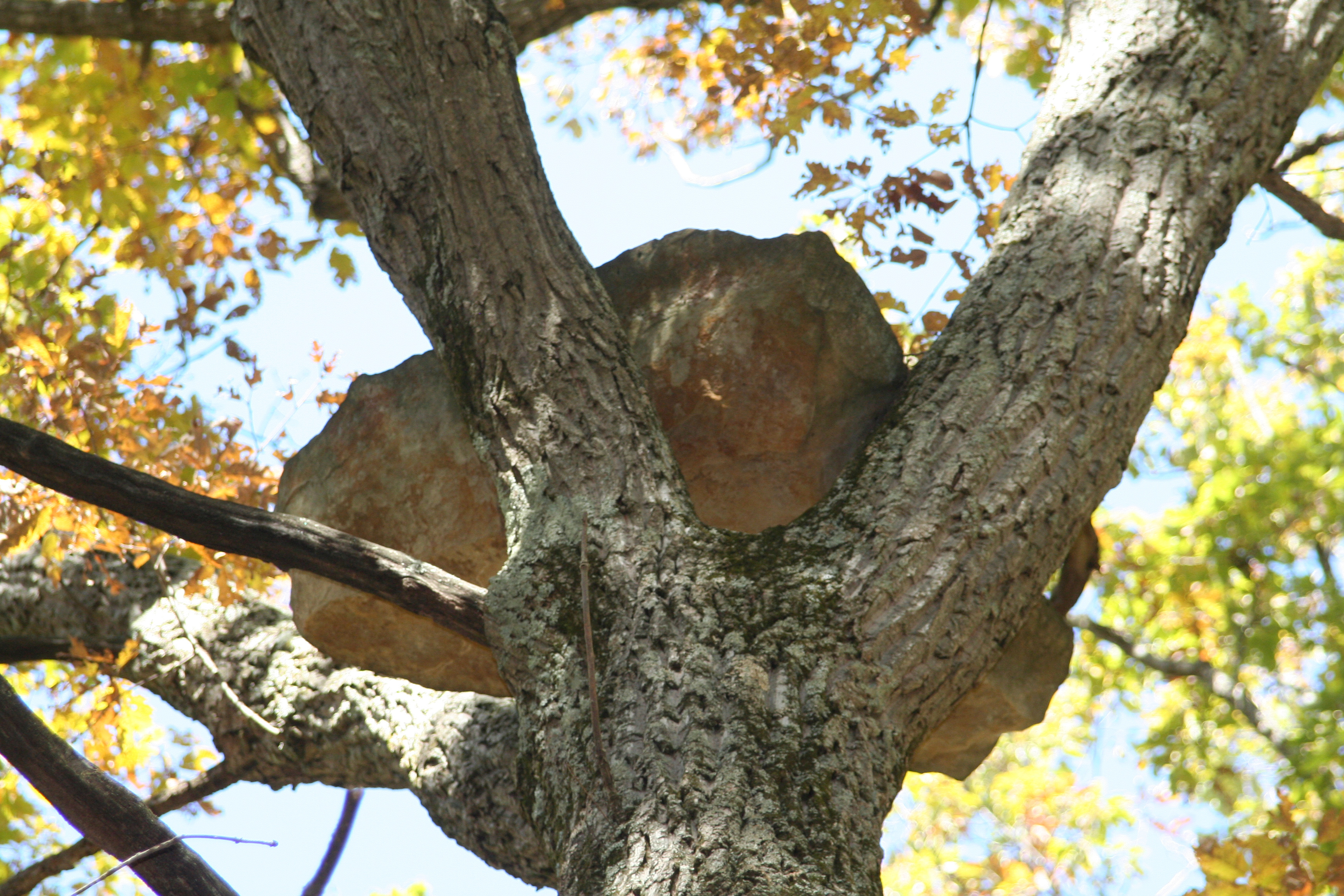
- A rock in a tree in Yellowwood State Forest

- Location within Indiana
- Location: Brown County, Indiana, Indiana, United States
- Nearest city: Nashville, Indiana
- Coordinates: 39°11′26″N 86°20′38″W
- Area: 23,326 acres (94.40 km^{2})
- Established: 1940
- Governing body: Indiana Department of Natural Resources
- Website: www.in.gov/dnr/forestry/4817.htm

Yellowwood State Forest, originally Beanblossom Land Utilization Project, is a state forest located in Brown County, Indiana, near the more famous Brown County State Park. The forest features seventeen different areas within Brown County, comprising over 25,000 acres (10,000 ha) in total. The name of the forest is derived from the yellowwood (Cladrastis kentukea), a tree seldom found this far north in the United States; it flowers here only every three to five years. The yellowwood groves make up only 200 acres (80 ha) of the park, although one tree has been planted by the forest office.

The forest preserve was established during the Great Depression, when work crews from the Civilian Conservation Corps and the Works Progress Administration built many of the structures still in use today. In 1940 the United States government leased the forest land to the state of Indiana, with Indiana being deeded the land in 1956. In 1994 and 1995 sixty-six additional acres (27 ha) of land in total were given to the forest.

Recreation in the park consists of camping, hunting, fishing, and hiking. The Tecumseh Trail goes through the forest on its way to the state forest office for Morgan–Monroe State Forest; the trail was originally supposed to become a national trail, reaching from Canada to Florida. A twenty-mile-long (32 km) hiking trail, the Ten O'Clock Line Hiking Trail, connects Yellowwood State Forest to Brown County State Park. The 133-acre (54 ha) lake, Yellowwood Lake, is thirty feet (9.1 m) deep and was created in 1939. Hunting typically involves deer, fox, grouse, raccoon, squirrel, turkey, and woodcock.

Many of the unpaved roads within the forest are dusty and narrow, and those driving cars within the forest will often have to ford creeks.

One major mystery surrounds the forest. Large sandstone boulders, estimated to weigh about 200 pounds (91 kg), have been found in the tops of three trees: one eighty-foot (24 m) tall chestnut oak and two American sycamores, one of which is 45 feet (14 m) tall. Speculation as to how the boulders got there ranges from college pranks, tornadoes, ancient hunters to UFOs.
