= Elkinsville, Indiana =

- Unincorporated community
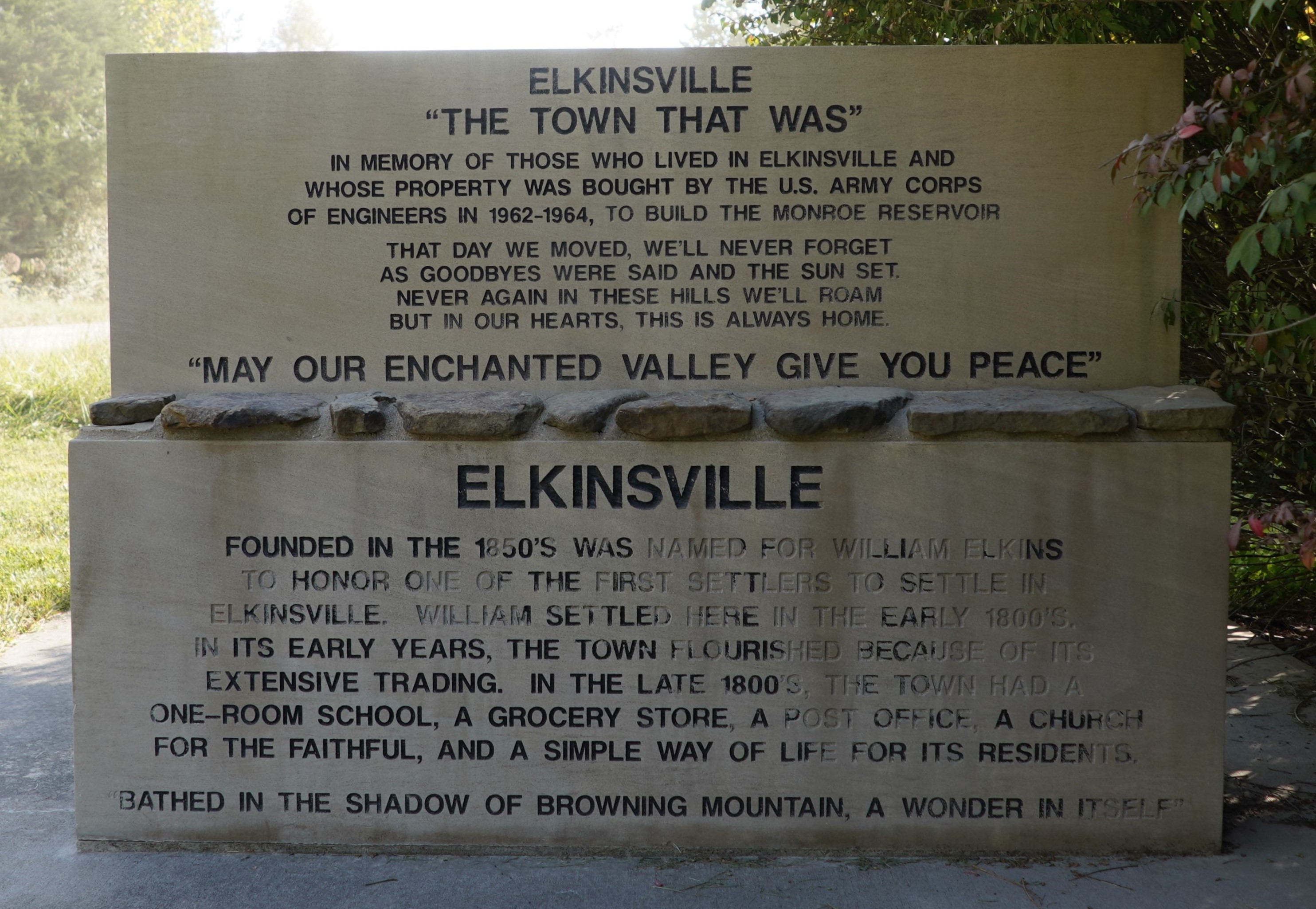
- Elkinsville, Indiana

- Brown County's location in Indiana

- Location in Brown County
- Coordinates: 39°04′34″N 86°15′53″W
- Country: United States
- State: Indiana
- County: Brown
- Township: Van Buren
- Founder: William Elkins
- Named for: William Elkins 1796-1880
- Elevation: 581 ft (177 m)
- Time zone: UTC-5 (Eastern (EST))
  - Summer (DST): UTC-4 (EDT)
- ZIP code: 47448
- Area codes: 812 & 930
- FIPS code: 18-20782
- GNIS feature ID: 450887

Elkinsville is an unincorporated community in Van Buren Township, Brown County, in the U.S. state of Indiana. It was once a thriving farming village, but was evacuated during the construction of nearby Lake Monroe Reservoir by eminent domain in 1964. All that remains of Elkinsville today are some private residences and the Elkinsville Cemetery. The area is part of Hoosier National Forest.

== History ==
Elkinsville was founded in the 1850s. It was named for William Elkins, a pioneer settler. A post office was established at Elkinsville in 1860, and remained in operation until it was discontinued in 1941. The town was acquired via eminent domain for the building of Lake Monroe Reservoir in 1964, but later it was discovered that a mistake in elevation estimates meant that the town would not be flooded.

== Geography ==
Elkinsville is located at 39°04′34″N 86°15′53″W.
