= Brown County, Indiana =

County in Indiana, United States

- County
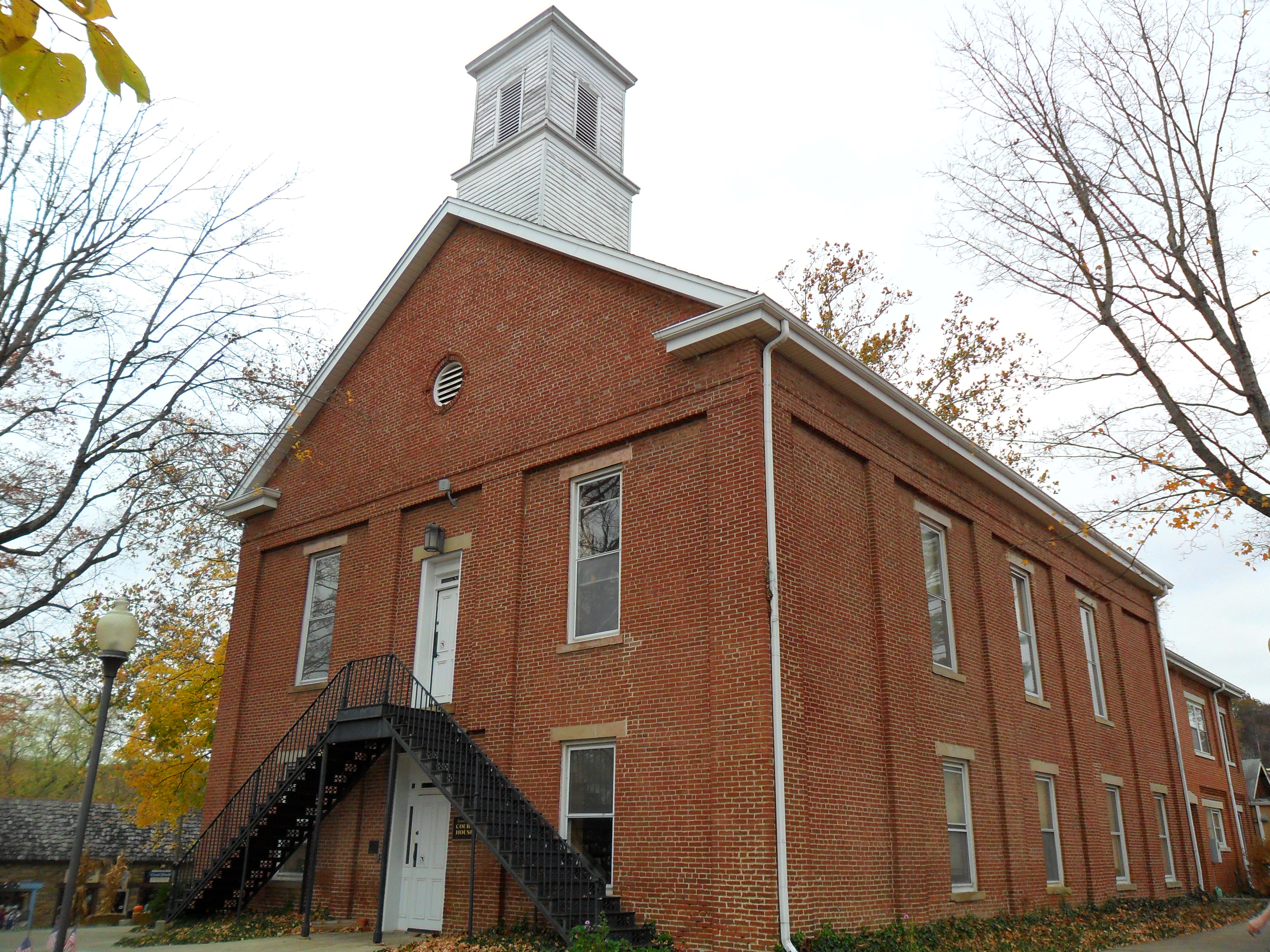
- Brown County Courthouse in Nashville

- Flag Seal

- Location within the U.S. state of Indiana
- Coordinates: 39°12′N 86°14′W
- Country: United States
- State: Indiana
- Founded: February 4, 1836 (created); August 1836 (organized)
- Named for: Jacob Brown
- Seat: Nashville
- Largest city: Nashville

Area
  - Total: 316.22 sq mi (819.0 km^{2})
  - Land: 311.58 sq mi (807.0 km^{2})
  - Water: 4.65 sq mi (12.0 km^{2}) 1.47%

Population (2020)
  - Total: 15,475
  - Estimate (2025): 15,777 ▲
  - Density: 49.666/sq mi (19.176/km^{2})
- Time zone: UTC−5 (Eastern)
  - Summer (DST): UTC−4 (EDT)
- Congressional district: 9th
- Website: browncounty-in.gov
- Indiana county number 7; Most Forested County in Indiana

Brown County is a county in south-central Indiana which in 2020 had a population of 15,475. The county seat (and only incorporated town) is Nashville.

== History ==
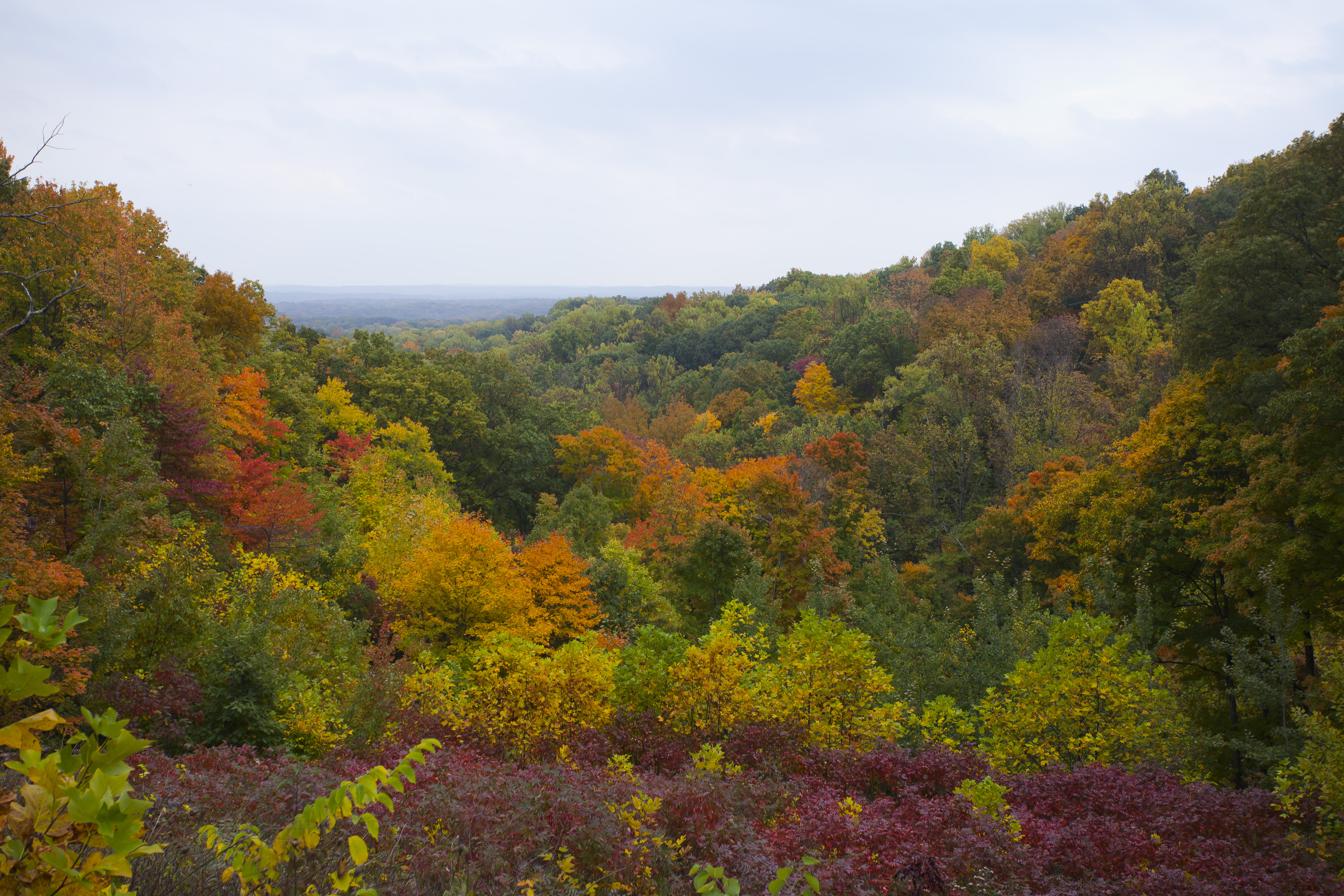
View from Brown County State Park

The United States acquired the land from the Native Americans, part of which forms the southwest section of what is now Brown County, in the 1809 treaty of Fort Wayne. By the treaty of St. Mary's in 1818 considerably more territory became property of the government and this included the future Brown County area. No settler was allowed in the area until the government survey was completed in 1820. The first white man known to arrive was a German, Johann Schoonover, who lived for a short time on the creek later named for him to trade with the Native Americans, about 1820. In that same year William Elkins, the first pioneer, built a log cabin and cleared land in the area. In the 1850s Elkins was recorded as having settled in the future Van Buren Township, and the settlement that grew up around him was known as Elkinsville.

The earliest pioneers came from Kentucky, Tennessee, Virginia, and the Carolinas. They crossed the Ohio River and traveled north on narrow Indian trails through dense hardwood forest with wagons drawn by oxen. Many made their way to Bloomington, then east to hilly country, or they reached Jackson County and came north into future Brown County on the Sparks Ferry Road, or west from Columbus in Bartholomew County. Pioneers who had settled on lowland near Columbus came to the hills to escape malaria. Others deliberately chose the hills having lived in mountains before they made the trip to Indiana in search of new land. By 1830 an estimated 150 settlers had arrived; the United States census of 1840 reported 2,364 people.

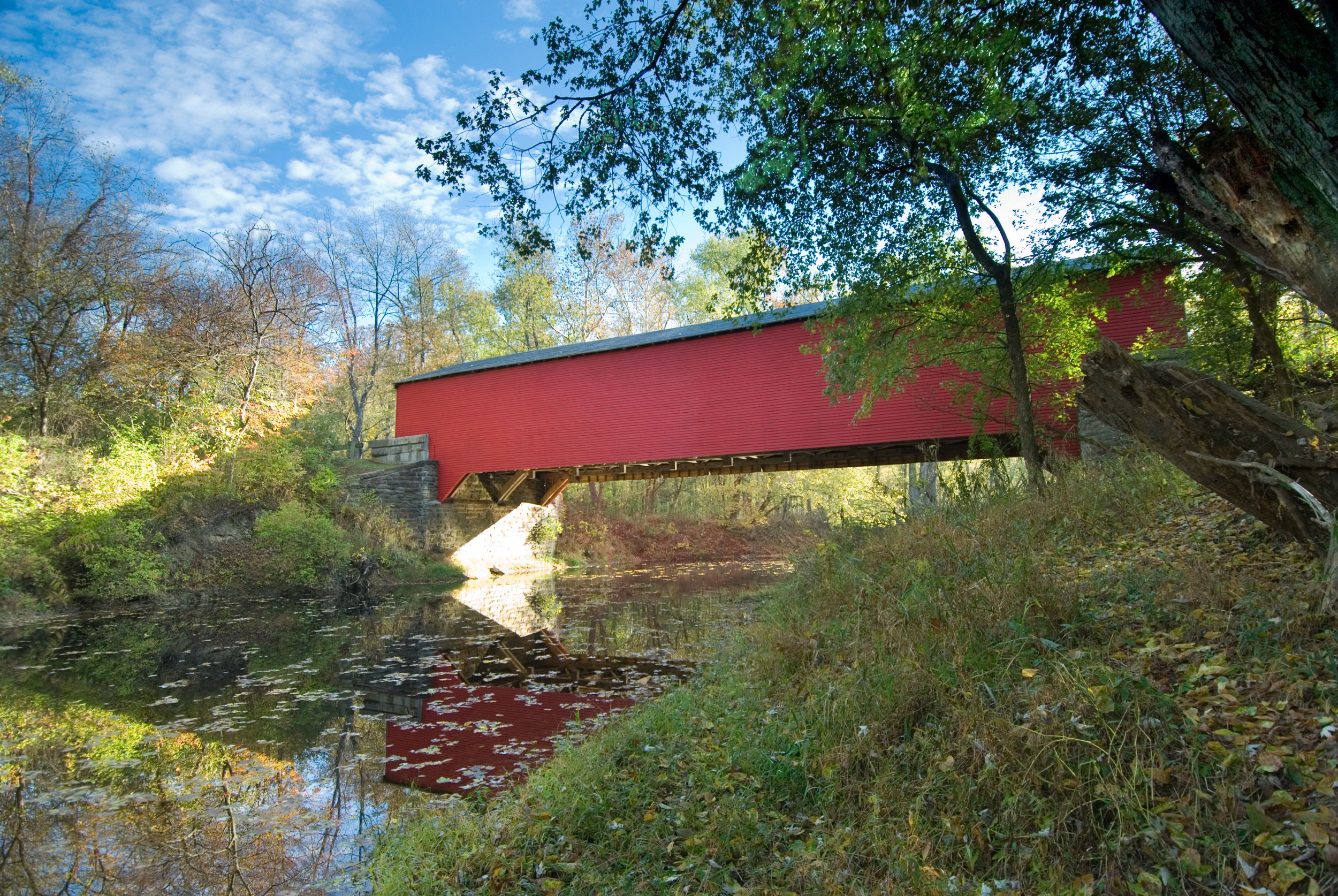
Covered bridge in Brown County, Indiana

By 1828 the Indiana State Legislature had divided the land of present-day Brown County between Monroe, Jackson, and Bartholomew counties. In 1835 settlers presented a petition to the Legislature requesting a new county. On February 4, 1836, both the House and Senate passed a bill providing for the formation from western Bartholomew, eastern Monroe, and northern Jackson counties of a county to be named for Gen. Jacob Brown, who defeated the British at the Battle of Sackett's Harbor in the War of 1812. The county covers a nominal 320 square miles (830 km^{2}), measuring a surveyed 16 miles (26 km) from east to west and 20 miles (32 km) from north to south.

In August 1836, the land was divided into five townships of Jackson, Hamblen, Washington, Johnson, and Van Buren. Nashville, then known as Jacksonburg, was chosen as the county seat. Banner C. Brummett was appointed County Agent to lay out Nashville in lots to be sold at auction. It was expected that money from the sale would help pay expenses of the county government. The lots sold very slowly, for pioneers had little money, and funds were short for a number of years. In 1837 a log court house and jail were built. They were built on the same lots on which the present court house and log jail stand. Nashville, at that time, consisted of a cluster of log cabins and 75 people.

The country was wild in 1836; bears, panthers, and wolves were plentiful. The wolves were so numerous that the Commissioners paid $1 for every wolf pelt brought to them. Settlers lived a rugged pioneer type of life for many years. Their cabins and small settlements were mere niches in the forest that covered hills and valleys.

By the time Nashville was incorporated in 1872, water-powered grist mills and sawmills were scattered over the county. Each village served its own locality with at least one general store, a blacksmith shop, a church and a post office. A doctor, sometimes more than one, lived in almost every village. In 1881 there were 20 doctors in the county, and 37 churches - Methodist, United Brethren, Baptist, Presbyterian, and New Light. There were many immigrants in Brown County at this time, including immigrants from England, Wales, Germany, and elsewhere. Two of the Presbyterian churches in the county had congregations that consisted entirely of Presbyterians of Scottish descent who came to America from County Down and County Antrim in the northeastern part of Ireland, in what has since become Northern Ireland. These immigrants were referred to by the rest of the community as being "Scots-Irish", however they referred to themselves as "Ulstermen" and "Irish Presbyterians." Money continued to be scarce and much business was conducted by the barter system. The first schools were built of logs, but by 1872 one-room frame school houses dotted the county; in 1900 there were 73.

People farmed but they depended on forest products for cash. Lumber was taken to Indianapolis, also tan bark, cross ties, hoop poles, and barrel staves. The trees were cut recklessly and this led to deep trouble. Since there was not enough farmland on the ridge tops and in the creek bottoms, trees were eliminated on the sides of hills. Wheat and other crops were planted, and erosion became a significant problem. By 1900, soil was so completely washed from hillsides and creek bottoms that crops could not be grown. Poverty was widespread and people began to leave the county in droves. Cabins all over the hills and valleys stood empty. In 1890, 10,308 people lived in Brown County. By 1930 only 5,168 remained. Not until 1980 did the population exceed the 1890 figure.

In 1900, villages were still the centers of Brown County life. Travel by horseback, wagon, or carriage was exceedingly limited due to deeply rutted, rocky roads. There were people in remote areas who never made a trip to Nashville during their lives. Many a family's only contact with the outside world was a salesman's weekly visit with his horse and wagon. As a result, the pioneer way of life continued long after other counties had adopted a new pattern of living.

In 1905 the Illinois Central Railroad built a line from Indianapolis to Effingham, Illinois. The line ran from Morgantown across the southwest corner of Jackson Township. Helmsburg was the main station. Two trains a day from Indianapolis, and two from Effingham, brought freight, mail, and passengers. Horse drawn hacks took people and wagons transported mail and freight from the station to Nashville.

The first cars appeared in Nashville in 1913. Their use was strictly limited because of the poor roads and because of the widespread belief, peculiar to Brown County, that cars were both autonomous and maleficent. By necessity as the number of cars increased, county roads were gradually improved. By 1934 State Road 135 north from Nashville to Morgantown had been built and in that year was hard surfaced. State Road 46 between Bloomington and Nashville was worked on extensively until it was considered one of the best gravel roads in the state. Some years later it was hard surfaced.

In 1907, artist T. C. Steele built a studio near Belmont in rural Brown County and Adolph Shulz came to Nashville and thus began the Brown County Art Colony. Will Vawter, V.J. Cariani, Marie Goth, C. Curry Bohn, Dale Bessire and others moved to Nashville. The Brown County Art Gallery was opened in 1926. In 1954 a larger gallery was built on East Main Street, and an Art Guild established a gallery in the old Minor House on Van Buren Street. Nashville continues to be an art center and tourist attraction.

Brown County State Park opened in 1931 offering many advantages: a lodge, cabins for rent, picnic areas, a swimming pool, and miles of trails. And at present there is Yellowwood State Forest, the Hoosier National Forest, Lake Monroe and Lake Lemon.

== Geography ==
Unlike much of Indiana with its low rolling hills, the terrain of Brown County is rugged and hilly, with the drainage areas filled with brush, undergrowth, or trees. The county's highest point (1,058 feet/322 meters ASL) is Weed Patch Hill, the third-highest prominence in the state.

According to the 2010 census, the county has a total area of 316.63 square miles (820.1 km^{2}), of which 311.98 square miles (808.0 km^{2}) (or 98.53%) is land and 4.65 square miles (12.0 km^{2}) (or 1.47%) is water. Brown County is tied with Benton County as the least densely populated county in Indiana. Brown County has by far the highest concentration of forested land of any of Indiana's 92 counties with nearly 90% coverage and almost no large farms at all.

=== Adjacent counties ===
- Johnson County - northeast
- Bartholomew County - east
- Jackson County - south
- Monroe County - west
- Morgan County - northwest

=== Incorporated community ===
- Nashville (county seat)

=== Unincorporated communities ===
- Bean Blossom
- Belmont
- Christiansburg
- Cornelius
- Elkinsville
- Fruitdale
- Gatesville
- Gnaw Bone
- Helmsburg
- Mount Liberty
- Needmore
- Pikes Peak
- Spearsville
- Stone Head
- Story
- Taggart
- Trevlac

=== Former communities ===
Oak Grove

Dollsberry

- Beck
- Beveridge
- Buffalo
- Cleona
- Cooper
- Gent
- Kelp
- Lock
- Marble
- Marshall
- Ramelton
- Sherman
- Youno

=== Townships ===
- Hamblen
- Jackson
- Van Buren
- Washington

=== Census-designated place ===
- Cordry Sweetwater Lakes

=== Major highways ===
- Indiana State Road 45
- Indiana State Road 46
- Indiana State Road 135

=== Protected areas ===
- Brown County State Park Brown County State Park
- Cordry Sweetwater Conservancy District
- Hoosier National Forest (part)
- T. C. Steele State Historic Site
- Yellowwood State Forest

=== Lakes ===
- Lake Lemon
- Monroe Lake

== Climate and weather ==
Nashville, Indiana

Climate chart (precipitation, max. and min. temperature)
| J | F | M | A | M | J | J | A | S | O | N | D |
| 2.7 36 19 | 2.7 42 23 | 3.7 52 32 | 4.3 64 41 | 5.1 74 52 | 4.1 82 61 | 4.3 86 65 | 4 84 62 | 3.6 78 55 | 3.1 67 44 | 4 54 35 | 3.4 41 24 |
- █ Average max. and min. temperatures in °F
- █ Precipitation totals in inches
- Source: The Weather Channel
Metric conversion
| J | F | M | A | M | J | J | A | S | O | N | D |
| 68 2 −7 | 69 6 −5 | 93 11 0 | 109 18 5 | 130 23 11 | 103 28 16 | 110 30 18 | 101 29 17 | 92 26 13 | 80 19 7 | 100 12 2 | 86 5 −4 |
- █ Average max. and min. temperatures in °C
- █ Precipitation totals in mm

In recent years, average temperatures in Nashville have ranged from a low of 19 °F (−7 °C) in January to a high of 86 °F (30 °C) in July, although a record low of −21 °F (−29 °C) was recorded in January 1985 and a record high of 110 °F (43 °C) was recorded in July 1936. Average monthly precipitation ranged from 2.66 inches (68 mm) in January to 5.12 inches (130 mm) in May.

== Government ==
The county government is a constitutional body, and is granted specific powers by the Constitution of Indiana, and by the Indiana Code.

County Council: The legislative branch of the county government; controls spending and revenue collection in the county. Representatives are elected to four-year terms from county districts. They set salaries, the annual budget, and special spending. The council has limited authority to impose local taxes, in the form of an income and property tax that is subject to state level approval, excise taxes, and service taxes.

Board of Commissioners: The executive body of the county. Commissioners are elected county-wide to staggered four-year terms. One commissioner serves as president. The commissioners execute acts legislated by the council, collect revenue, and manage the county government.

Court: The county maintains a circuit court with jurisdiction to hear civil and criminal cases. The judge on the court is elected to a term of six years and must be an attorney licensed to practice in Indiana. The judge is assisted by a magistrate who is hired by the circuit court judge, not elected.

County Officials: The county has other elected offices, including sheriff, coroner, auditor, treasurer, recorder, surveyor, and circuit court clerk. These officers are elected to four-year terms.

Brown County is part of Indiana's 9th congressional district, Indiana Senate district 40 and Indiana House of Representatives districts 60 and 65.

United States presidential election results for Brown County, Indiana
| Year | Republican | | Democratic | | Third party(ies) | |
| Year | No. | % | No. | % | No. | % |
|---|---|---|---|---|---|---|
| 1888 | 661 | 29.08% | 1,538 | 67.66% | 74 | 3.26% |
| 1892 | 656 | 30.27% | 1,378 | 63.59% | 133 | 6.14% |
| 1896 | 726 | 32.63% | 1,480 | 66.52% | 19 | 0.85% |
| 1900 | 707 | 32.09% | 1,450 | 65.82% | 46 | 2.09% |
| 1904 | 760 | 37.36% | 1,157 | 56.88% | 117 | 5.75% |
| 1908 | 663 | 34.60% | 1,177 | 61.43% | 76 | 3.97% |
| 1912 | 305 | 19.74% | 909 | 58.83% | 331 | 21.42% |
| 1916 | 506 | 31.72% | 1,046 | 65.58% | 43 | 2.70% |
| 1920 | 788 | 36.75% | 1,316 | 61.38% | 40 | 1.87% |
| 1924 | 756 | 36.93% | 1,229 | 60.04% | 62 | 3.03% |
| 1928 | 959 | 48.51% | 999 | 50.53% | 19 | 0.96% |
| 1932 | 790 | 31.26% | 1,676 | 66.32% | 61 | 2.41% |
| 1936 | 1,244 | 43.74% | 1,585 | 55.73% | 15 | 0.53% |
| 1940 | 1,477 | 46.74% | 1,662 | 52.59% | 21 | 0.66% |
| 1944 | 1,174 | 45.66% | 1,352 | 52.59% | 45 | 1.75% |
| 1948 | 1,092 | 41.54% | 1,459 | 55.50% | 78 | 2.97% |
| 1952 | 1,517 | 51.18% | 1,414 | 47.71% | 33 | 1.11% |
| 1956 | 1,649 | 51.23% | 1,555 | 48.31% | 15 | 0.47% |
| 1960 | 1,679 | 51.76% | 1,533 | 47.26% | 32 | 0.99% |
| 1964 | 1,390 | 39.22% | 2,135 | 60.24% | 19 | 0.54% |
| 1968 | 1,881 | 49.41% | 1,327 | 34.86% | 599 | 15.73% |
| 1972 | 2,737 | 65.06% | 1,443 | 34.30% | 27 | 0.64% |
| 1976 | 2,466 | 50.29% | 2,381 | 48.55% | 57 | 1.16% |
| 1980 | 2,884 | 54.51% | 2,014 | 38.06% | 393 | 7.43% |
| 1984 | 3,517 | 56.74% | 2,657 | 42.87% | 24 | 0.39% |
| 1988 | 3,348 | 60.86% | 2,115 | 38.45% | 38 | 0.69% |
| 1992 | 2,633 | 41.63% | 2,029 | 32.08% | 1,663 | 26.29% |
| 1996 | 2,988 | 47.36% | 2,413 | 38.25% | 908 | 14.39% |
| 2000 | 3,871 | 56.78% | 2,608 | 38.26% | 338 | 4.96% |
| 2004 | 4,512 | 61.56% | 2,730 | 37.24% | 88 | 1.20% |
| 2008 | 4,060 | 50.40% | 3,854 | 47.85% | 141 | 1.75% |
| 2012 | 4,332 | 56.75% | 3,060 | 40.08% | 242 | 3.17% |
| 2016 | 5,016 | 62.69% | 2,518 | 31.47% | 467 | 5.84% |
| 2020 | 5,777 | 64.32% | 3,036 | 33.80% | 168 | 1.87% |
| 2024 | 5,647 | 65.46% | 2,832 | 32.83% | 148 | 1.72% |

== Demographics ==
Historical population
| Census | Pop. | Note | %± |
|---|---|---|---|
| 1840 | 2,364 | | — |
| 1850 | 4,846 | | 105.0% |
| 1860 | 6,507 | | 34.3% |
| 1870 | 8,681 | | 33.4% |
| 1880 | 10,264 | | 18.2% |
| 1890 | 10,308 | | 0.4% |
| 1900 | 9,727 | | −5.6% |
| 1910 | 7,975 | | −18.0% |
| 1920 | 7,019 | | −12.0% |
| 1930 | 5,168 | | −26.4% |
| 1940 | 6,189 | | 19.8% |
| 1950 | 6,209 | | 0.3% |
| 1960 | 7,024 | | 13.1% |
| 1970 | 9,057 | | 28.9% |
| 1980 | 12,377 | | 36.7% |
| 1990 | 14,080 | | 13.8% |
| 2000 | 14,957 | | 6.2% |
| 2010 | 15,242 | | 1.9% |
| 2020 | 15,475 | | 1.5% |
| 2025 (est.) | 15,777 | ▲ | 2.0% |
US Decennial Census; 1790-1960 1900-1990; 1990-2000 2010

=== Racial and ethnic composition ===
Brown County, Indiana – Racial and ethnic composition Note: the US Census treats Hispanic/Latino as an ethnic category. This table excludes Latinos from the racial categories and assigns them to a separate category. Hispanics/Latinos may be of any race.
| Race / Ethnicity (NH = Non-Hispanic) | Pop 1980 | Pop 1990 | Pop 2000 | Pop 2010 | Pop 2020 | % 1980 | % 1990 | % 2000 | % 2010 | % 2020 |
|---|---|---|---|---|---|---|---|---|---|---|
| White alone (NH) | 12,231 | 13,900 | 14,609 | 14,761 | 14,463 | 98.82% | 98.72% | 97.67% | 96.84% | 93.46% |
| Black or African American alone (NH) | 18 | 13 | 32 | 53 | 55 | 0.15% | 0.09% | 0.21% | 0.35% | 0.36% |
| Native American or Alaska Native alone (NH) | 20 | 46 | 32 | 47 | 30 | 0.16% | 0.33% | 0.21% | 0.31% | 0.19% |
| Asian alone (NH) | 11 | 18 | 29 | 44 | 65 | 0.09% | 0.13% | 0.19% | 0.29% | 0.42% |
| Native Hawaiian or Pacific Islander alone (NH) | x | x | 1 | 1 | 5 | x | x | 0.01% | 0.01% | 0.03% |
| Other race alone (NH) | 9 | 9 | 9 | 12 | 48 | 0.07% | 0.06% | 0.06% | 0.08% | 0.31% |
| Mixed race or Multiracial (NH) | x | x | 114 | 146 | 539 | x | x | 0.76% | 0.96% | 3.48% |
| Hispanic or Latino (any race) | 88 | 94 | 131 | 178 | 270 | 0.71% | 0.67% | 0.88% | 1.17% | 1.74% |
| Total | 12,377 | 14,080 | 14,957 | 15,242 | 15,475 | 100.00% | 100.00% | 100.00% | 100.00% | 100.00% |

=== 2020 census ===
As of the 2020 census, the county had a population of 15,475. The median age was 50.1 years. 18.3% of residents were under the age of 18 and 24.6% of residents were 65 years of age or older. For every 100 females there were 100.8 males, and for every 100 females age 18 and over there were 100.4 males age 18 and over.

The racial makeup of the county was 94.1% White, 0.4% Black or African American, 0.2% American Indian and Alaska Native, 0.4% Asian, <0.1% Native Hawaiian and Pacific Islander, 0.7% from some other race, and 4.1% from two or more races. Hispanic or Latino residents of any race comprised 1.7% of the population.

<0.1% of residents lived in urban areas, while 100.0% lived in rural areas.

There were 6,557 households in the county, of which 23.9% had children under the age of 18 living in them. Of all households, 55.6% were married-couple households, 17.5% were households with a male householder and no spouse or partner present, and 20.8% were households with a female householder and no spouse or partner present. About 26.5% of all households were made up of individuals and 14.1% had someone living alone who was 65 years of age or older.

There were 8,436 housing units, of which 22.3% were vacant. Among occupied housing units, 83.1% were owner-occupied and 16.9% were renter-occupied. The homeowner vacancy rate was 1.7% and the rental vacancy rate was 5.3%.

=== 2010 Census ===
As of the 2010 United States census, there were 15,242 people, 6,199 households, and 4,444 families in the county. The population density was 48.9 inhabitants per square mile (18.9/km^{2}). There were 8,285 housing units at an average density of 26.6 per square mile (10.3/km^{2}). The racial makeup of the county was 97.6% white, 0.3% Asian, 0.3% American Indian, 0.3% black or African American, 0.3% from other races, and 1.1% from two or more races. Those of Hispanic or Latino origin made up 1.2% of the population. In terms of ancestry, 27.2% were German, 13.1% were Irish, 11.6% were English, and 11.3% were American. Those citing "American" ancestry in Brown County are of overwhelmingly English extraction, however most English Americans identify simply as having American ancestry because their roots have been in North America for so long, in some cases since the 1600s.

Of the 6,199 households, 26.8% had children under the age of 18 living with them, 60.2% were married couples living together, 7.2% had a female householder with no husband present, 28.3% were non-families, and 23.6% of all households were made up of individuals. The average household size was 2.43 and the average family size was 2.85. The median age was 46.7 years.

The median income for a household in the county was $47,697 and the median income for a family was $56,911. Males had a median income of $42,269 versus $30,175 for females. The per capita income for the county was $24,312. About 9.0% of families and 10.8% of the population were below the poverty line, including 17.2% of those under age 18 and 6.5% of those age 65 or over.

== See also ==
- National Register of Historic Places listings in Brown County, Indiana
