= National Register of Historic Places listings in Brown County, Indiana =

Location of Brown County in Indiana

This is a list of the National Register of Historic Places listings in Brown County, Indiana.

This is intended to be a complete list of the properties and districts on the National Register of Historic Places in Brown County, Indiana, United States. Latitude and longitude coordinates are provided for many National Register properties and districts; these locations may be seen together in a map.

There are nine properties and districts listed on the National Register in the county. Another three properties were once listed but have been removed.

Properties and districts located in incorporated areas display the name of the municipality, while properties and districts in unincorporated areas display the name of their civil township. Properties and districts split between multiple jurisdictions display the names of all jurisdictions.

This National Park Service list is complete through NPS recent listings posted August 22, 2025.

== Current listings ==
| | Name on the Register | Image | Date listed | Location | City or town | Description |
|---|---|---|---|---|---|---|
| 1 | Bean Blossom Covered Bridge | Bean Blossom Covered Bridge | February 10, 2022 (#100007441) | Covered Bridge Rd. over Bean Blossom Cr., 7/10 mi. SW of jct. of IN 45 and IN 135; 39°15′39″N 86°15′19″W | Bean Blossom vicinity | |
| 2 | Brown County Bridge No. 36 | Brown County Bridge No. 36 | December 21, 1993 (#93001430) | Hickory Hill Rd. across the North Fork of Salt Creek, southwest of Nashville; 39°10′59″N 86°18′12″W | Washington Township | |
| 3 | Brown County Courthouse Historic District | Brown County Courthouse Historic District | July 21, 1983 (#83000050) | Courthouse, Old Log Jail, and the Historical Society Museum Building; 39°12′28″N 86°14′48″W | Nashville | |
| 4 | Brown County State Park | Brown County State Park | December 7, 2020 (#100005867) | 1405 IN 46 West; 39°06′49″N 86°15′53″W | Nashville vicinity | |
| 5 | Thomas A. Hendricks House and Stone Head Road Marker | Thomas A. Hendricks House and Stone Head Road Marker | December 6, 1984 (#84000450) | State Road 135 and Bellsville Rd. at Stone Head; 39°07′47″N 86°09′31″W | Van Buren Township | |
| 6 | Nashville Historic District | Nashville Historic District | November 21, 2022 (#100008408) | Roughly bounded by Old School Way, Johnson, Mound, and Franklin Sts. including blk. south of Franklin St. between Van Buren and Jefferson Sts. 39°12′26″N 86°14′54″W | Nashville | |
| 7 | Theodore Clement Steele House and Studio | Theodore Clement Steele House and Studio | October 2, 1973 (#73000029) | Southwest of Nashville off State Road 46; 39°07′50″N 86°20′19″W | Washington Township | Associated with American Impressionist painter T. C. Steele |
| 8 | Story Historic District | Story Historic District | March 11, 2019 (#100003500) | Elkinsville Rd. at IN 135; 39°05′56″N 86°12′50″W | Nashville | |
| 9 | F.P. Taggart Store | F.P. Taggart Store | December 22, 1983 (#83003559) | Main and Van Buren Sts. 39°12′25″N 86°14′52″W | Nashville | |

== Former listings ==
| | Name on the Register | Image | Date listed | Date removed | Location | City or town | Description |
|---|---|---|---|---|---|---|---|
| 1 | Axsom Branch Archeological Site (12BR12) | | March 25, 1986 (#86000525) | September 8, 1995 | Address Restricted | Nashville | |
| 2 | Grandview Church | Grandview Church | September 13, 1991 (#91001160) | September 29, 2010 | Grandview Ridge Rd. southeast of New Bellsville; 39°07′28″N 86°04′05″W | Nashville | Destroyed by arsonist in 2010. Pre-arson photograph. |
| 3 | Refuge No. 7 Archeological Site (12BR11) | | March 25, 1986 (#86000629) | September 8, 1995 | Address Restricted | Nashville | |

== See also ==
- List of National Historic Landmarks in Indiana
- National Register of Historic Places listings in Indiana
- Listings in neighboring counties: Bartholomew, Jackson, Johnson, Monroe, Morgan
- List of Indiana state historical markers in Brown County
