= List of Indiana state historical markers in Brown County =

Location of Brown County in Indiana

This is a list of the Indiana state historical markers in Brown County.

This is intended to be a detailed table of the official state historical marker placed in Brown County, Indiana, United States by the Indiana Historical Bureau. The location of the historical marker and its latitude and longitude coordinates are included below when available, along with its name, year of placement, and topics as recorded by the Historical Bureau. There are 4 historical markers located in Brown County.

== Historical marker ==
Marker title	Image	Year placed	Location	Topics
T. C. Steele Home and Studio		1992	Southeastern corner of the junction of State Road 46 and T.C. Steele Road near Belmont; 39°7′54″N 86°20′53″W	Arts and Culture, Buildings and Architecture
Brown County Bluegrass Music		2016	5163 SR 135, at the Bill Monroe Memorial Music Park, Morgantown; 39°16′13″N 86°14′56″W	Arts and Culture
T.C. Steele Home, Studio, Gardens		2017	T.C. Steele State Historic Site, 4220 T.C. Steele Rd., Nashville; 39°7′53″N 86°20′53″W	Arts and Culture
Frank Hohenberger, 1876-1963		2019	5 S. Van Buren St. (State Rd. 135), Nashville; 39°12′25″N 86°14′49″W	Arts and Culture
The Brown County Art Colony		2021	The Village Green, West Main and Jefferson Streets, Nashville; 39°12′26″N 86°14′53″W	Arts and Culture
Kin Hubbard and Abe Martin		2023	Behind Abe Martin Lodge, 1405 IN-46 W, Nashville; 39°11′13″N 86°12′55″W	Arts & Culture; Newspaper & Media

== See also ==
- List of Indiana state historical markers
- National Register of Historic Places listings in Brown County, Indiana
