= List of Indiana state historical markers =

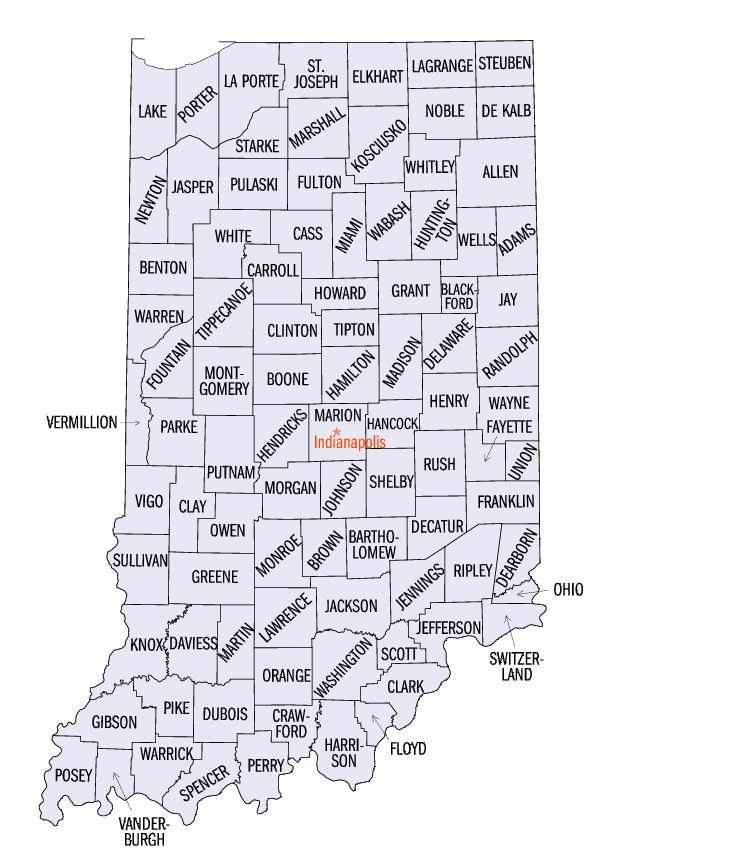
Indiana counties

This is a list of Indiana state historical markers.

Interest in a statewide system of historical markers for the U.S. state of Indiana arose as the state prepared to celebrate its centenary in 1916; the Indiana Historical Commission observed the lack of a system of historical markers and memorials, and as a result of its work, many individuals, organizations, and local governments began to erect various types of memorials to commemorate historic sites. Increasing numbers of historical markers through the 1920s and 1930s prompted the Commission and its successor, the Indiana Historical Bureau, to develop statewide lists of markers, and it asked the General Assembly for authority to become involved in the placement of historical markers in order to improve the numbers, quality, and topics of the markers. The New Deal administrations created to fight the Great Depression of the 1930s provided the manpower for the Bureau's first effort; workers from the Works Progress Administration produced steel signs for locations across the state, but their intentionally temporary nature meant that many had greatly deteriorated by the time that they were removed for scrap during World War II.

After the war's end, state officials began to plan for a system of aluminum markers that could be expected to endure indefinitely. Although a few markers were placed privately in the first two decades after the war ended, the majority of the few markers that were erected during this time were state-funded markers to celebrate the centenary of the Civil War in the early 1960s. The state made its first substantial foray into the program in 1966 as it reached the sesquicentenary of statehood, and the Sesquicentennial Commission quickly doubled the number of state-financed markers. However, permanent financial involvement only began in 1989, when substantial funding was first granted for the purchase of markers on a long-term basis. More new markers were placed over the next fifteen years than had been placed since permanent markers were first produced in 1947. By 2024, more than 500 historic sites in 91 of the state's 92 counties had been commemorated by an official Indiana state historical marker.

== Numbers of listings by county ==
The following are tallies of current marker listings in Indiana by county. These counts are based on entries in the Indiana Historical Bureau's marker list as of March 2024. There are yearly additions to the listings and some markers may be missing or stolen.

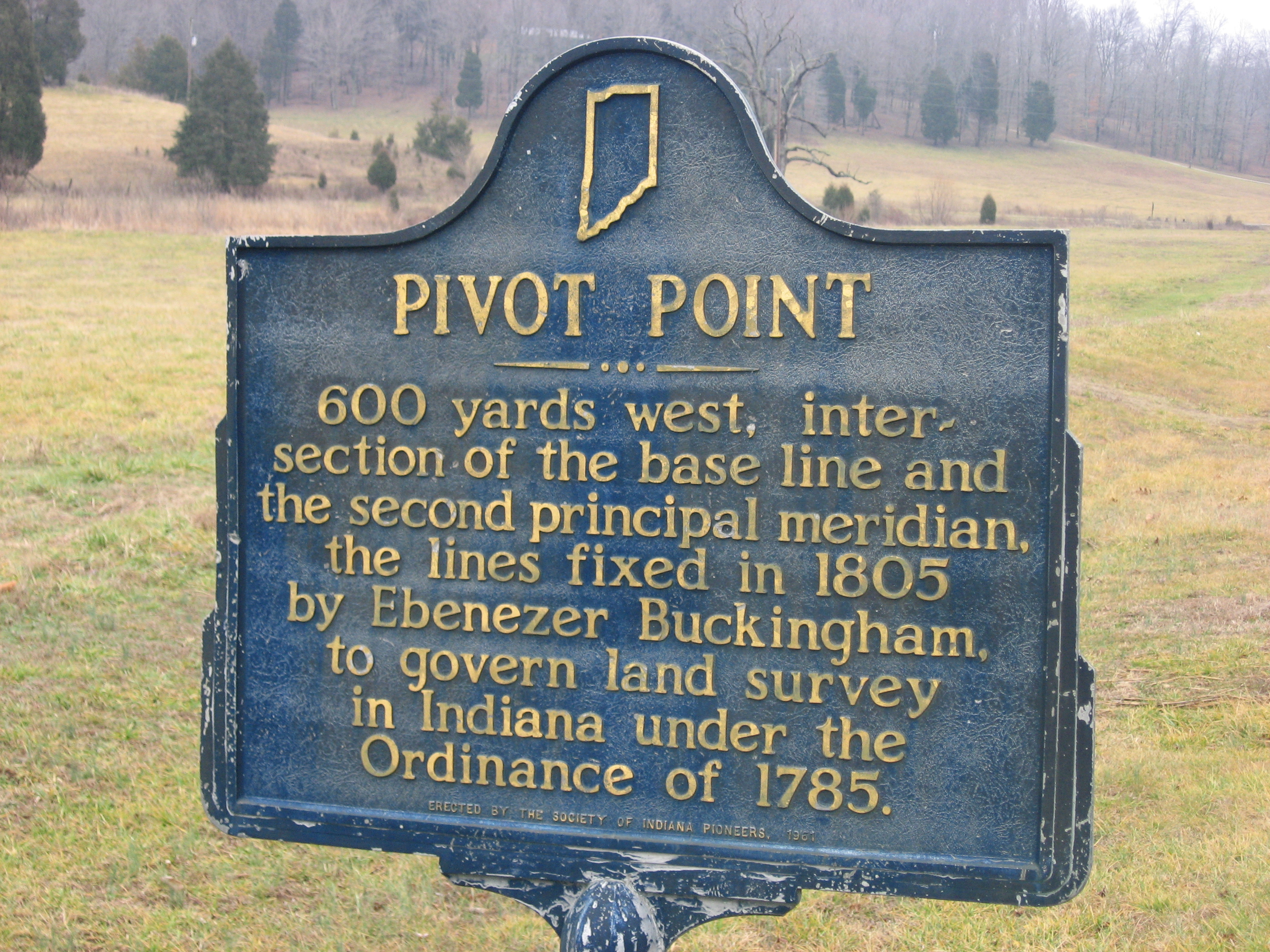
Pivot Point, in Orange County

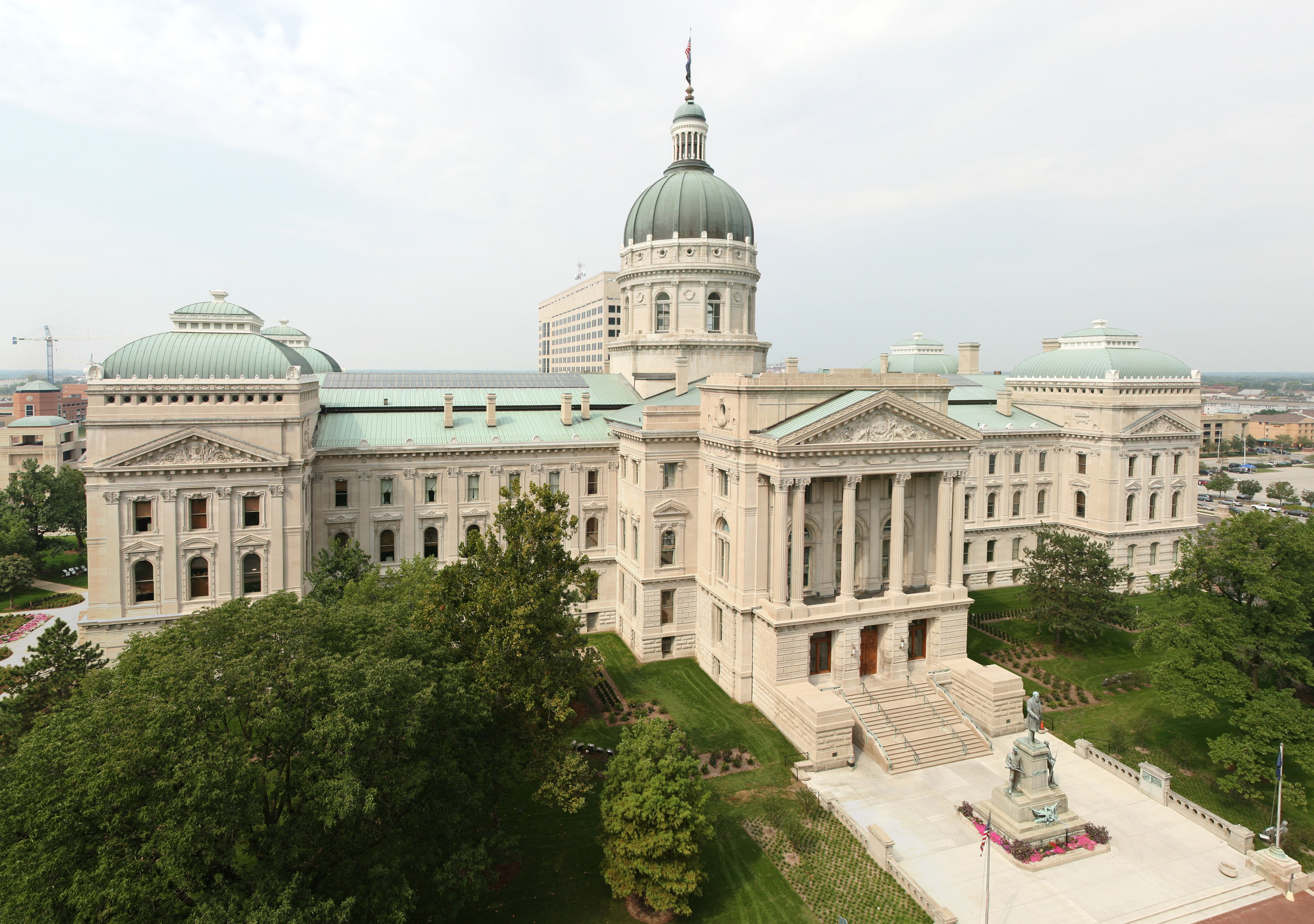
State Capitol, in Marion County

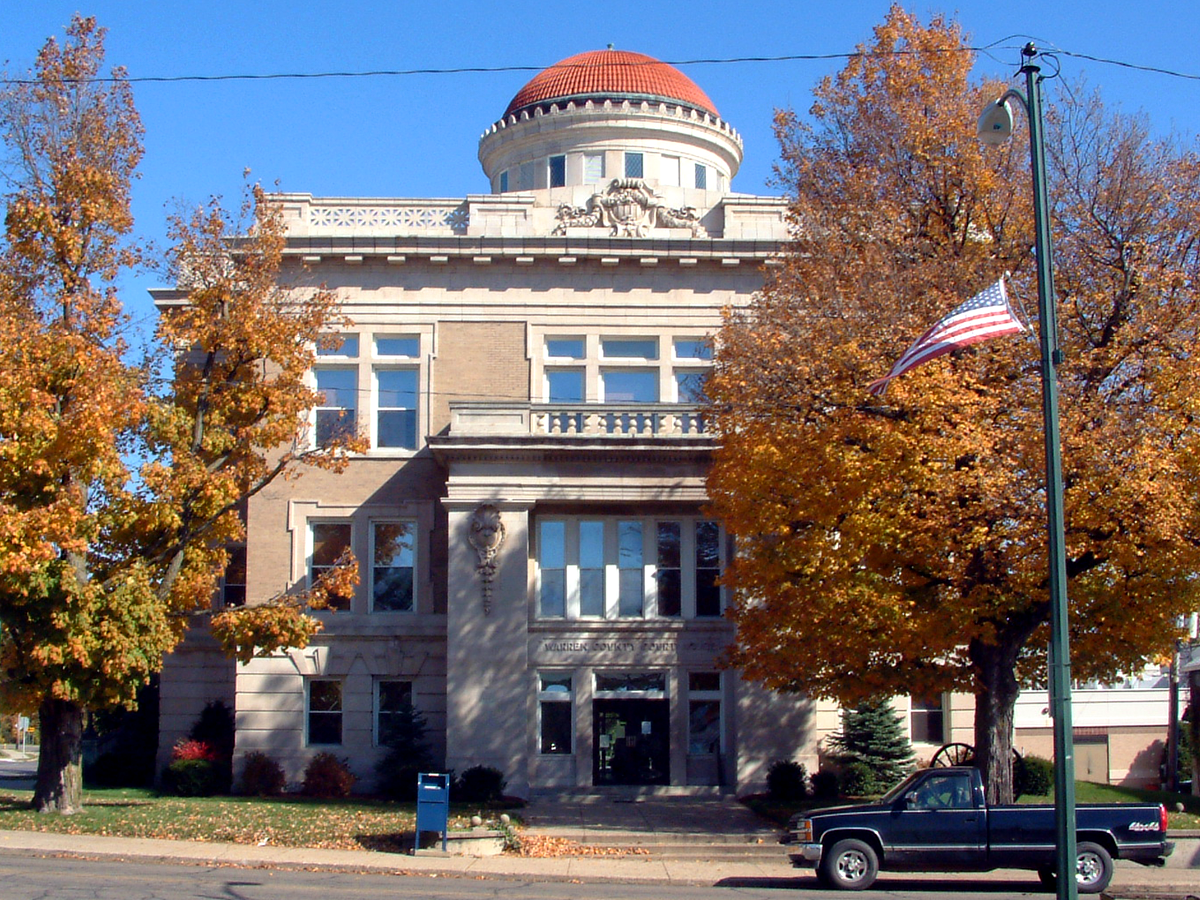
Williamsport, in Warren County

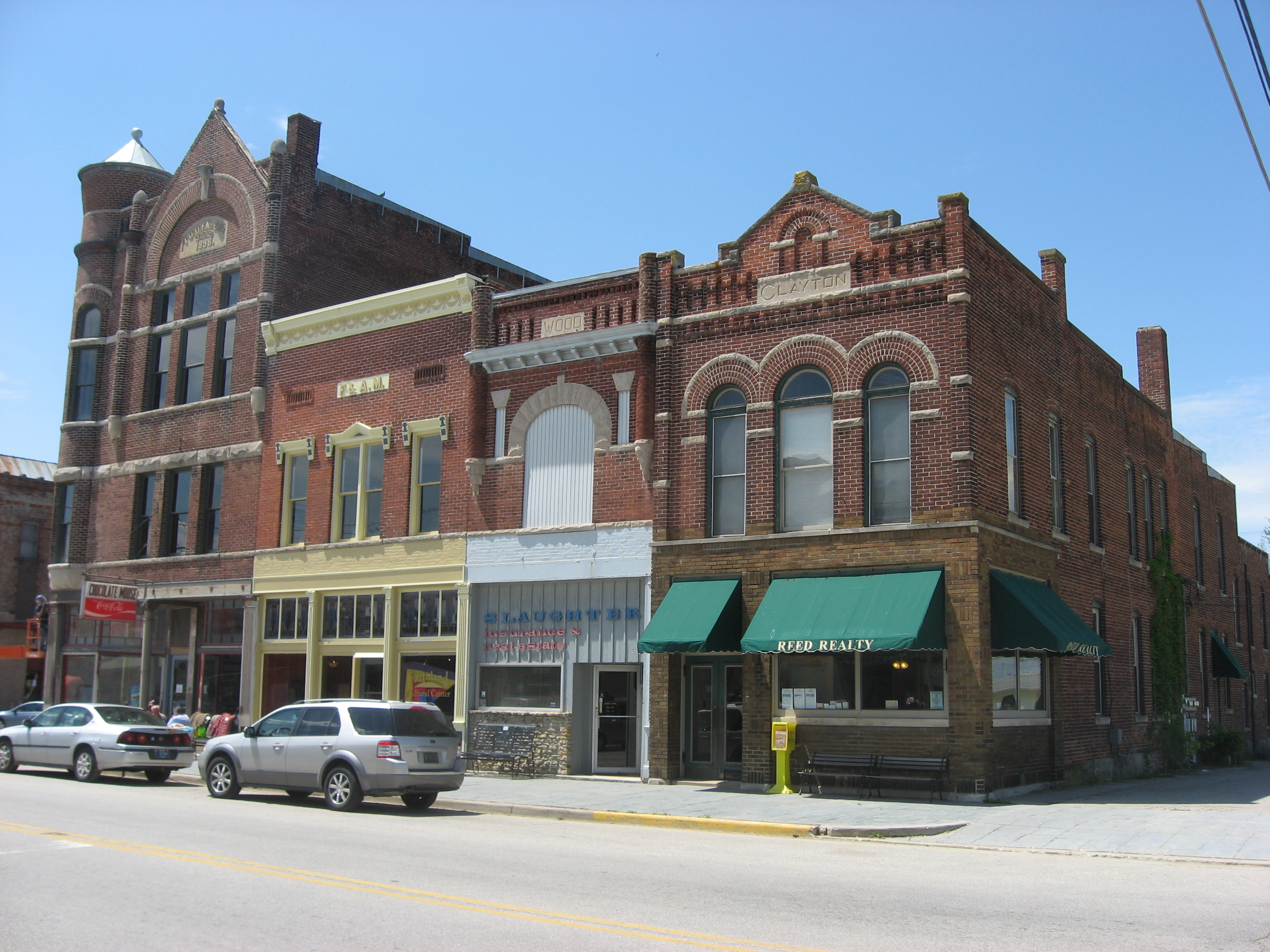
Farmland Downtown Historic District, in Randolph County

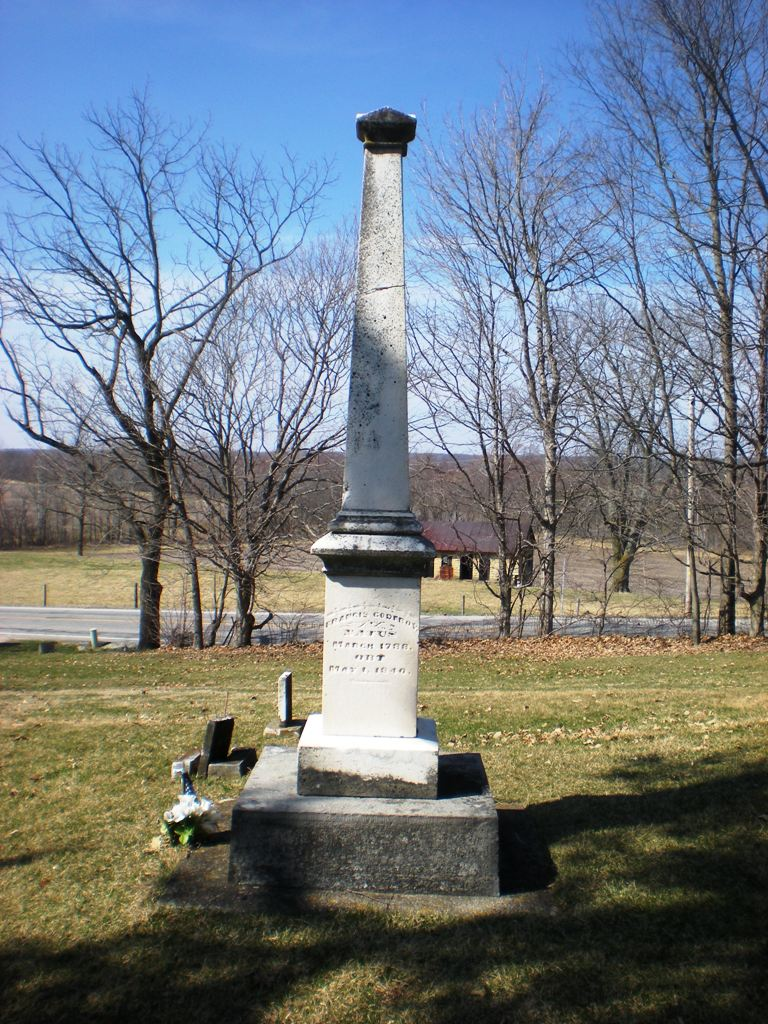
Burial Place of Francis Godfroy, in Miami County

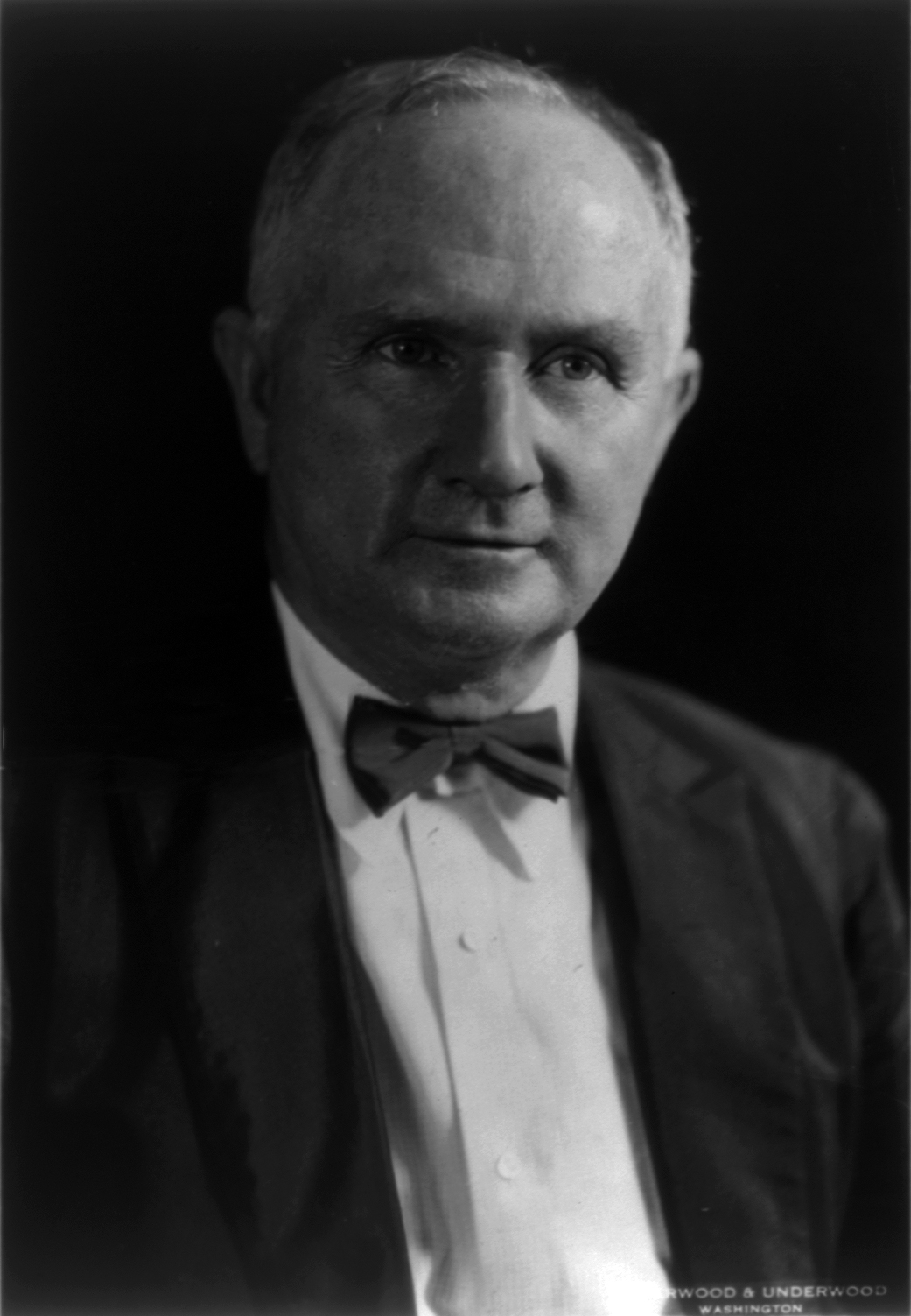
Dr. Elwood Mead (1858–1936), in Switzerland County

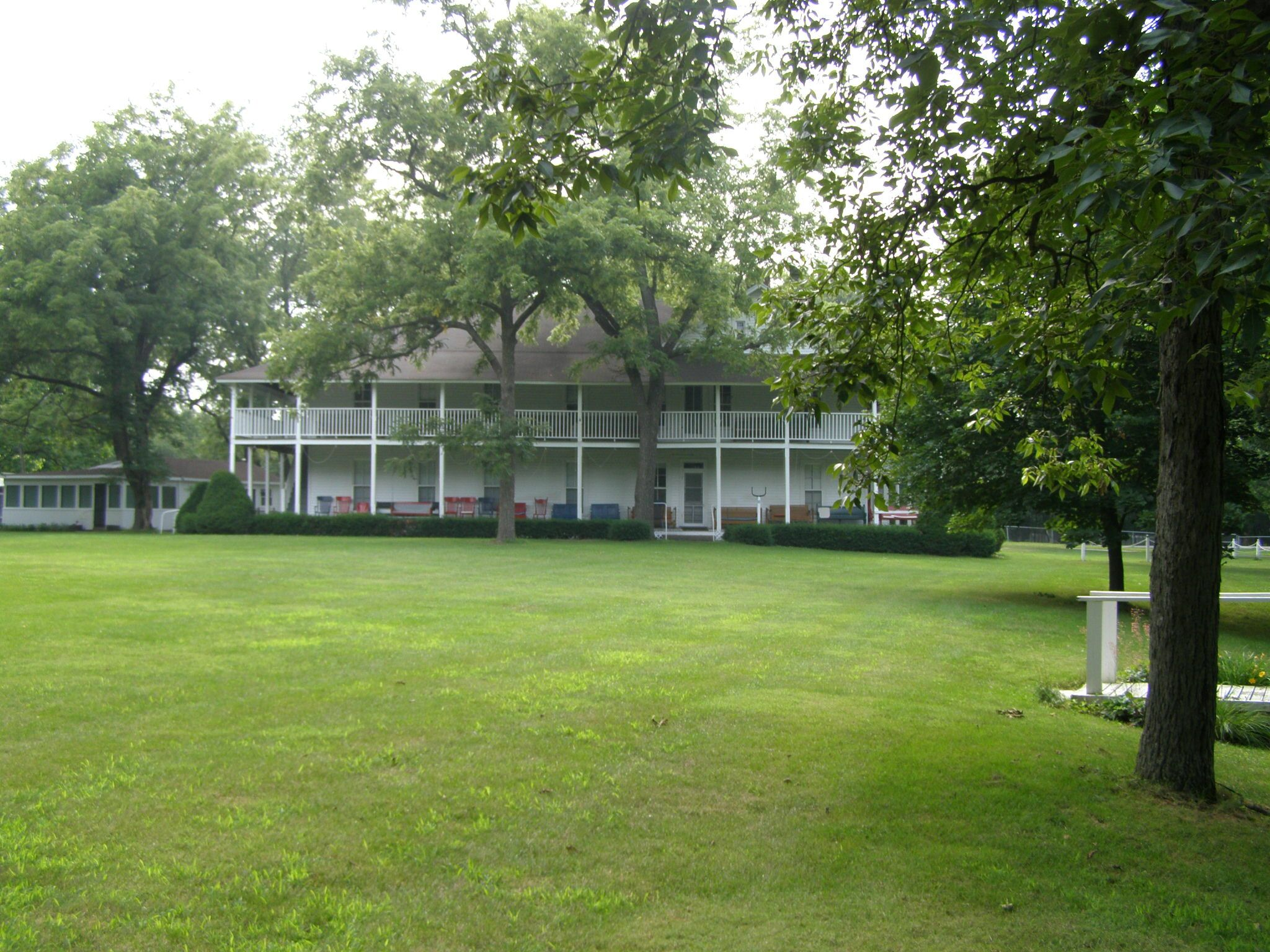
Fountain Park Chatauqua, in Jasper County

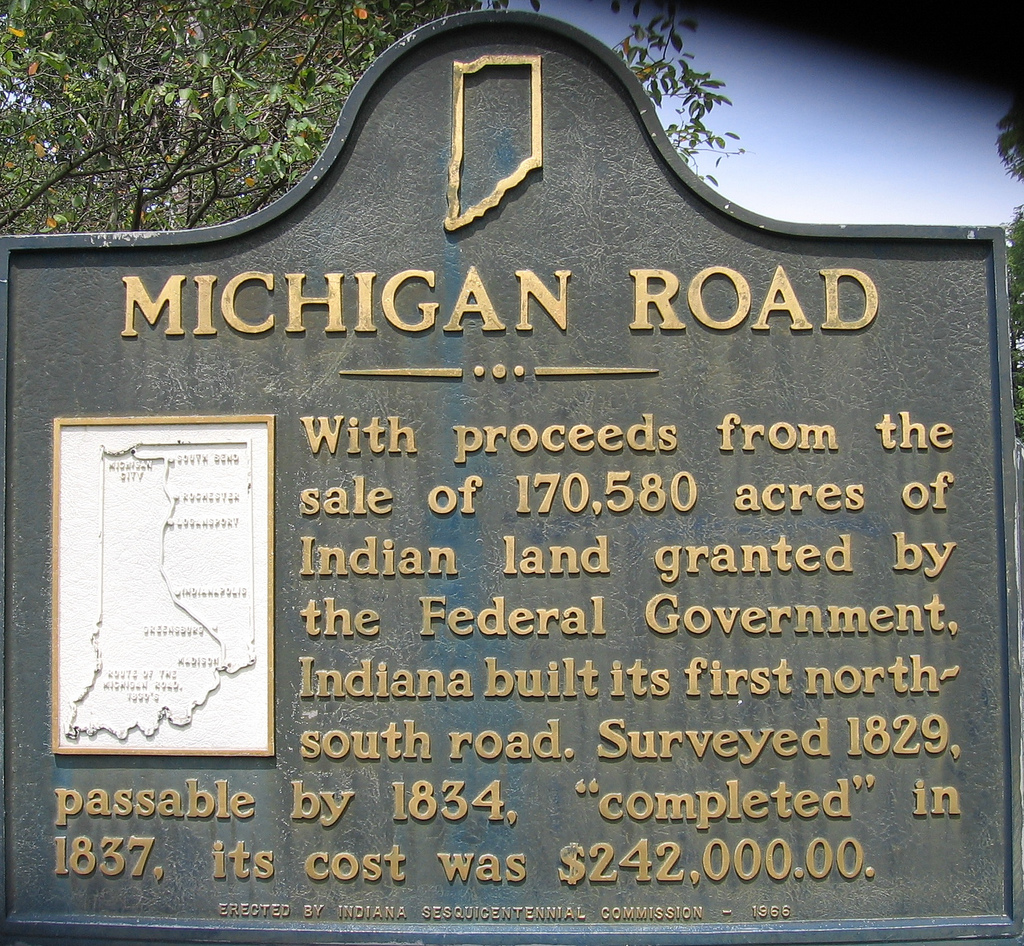
Michigan Road, in Boone County

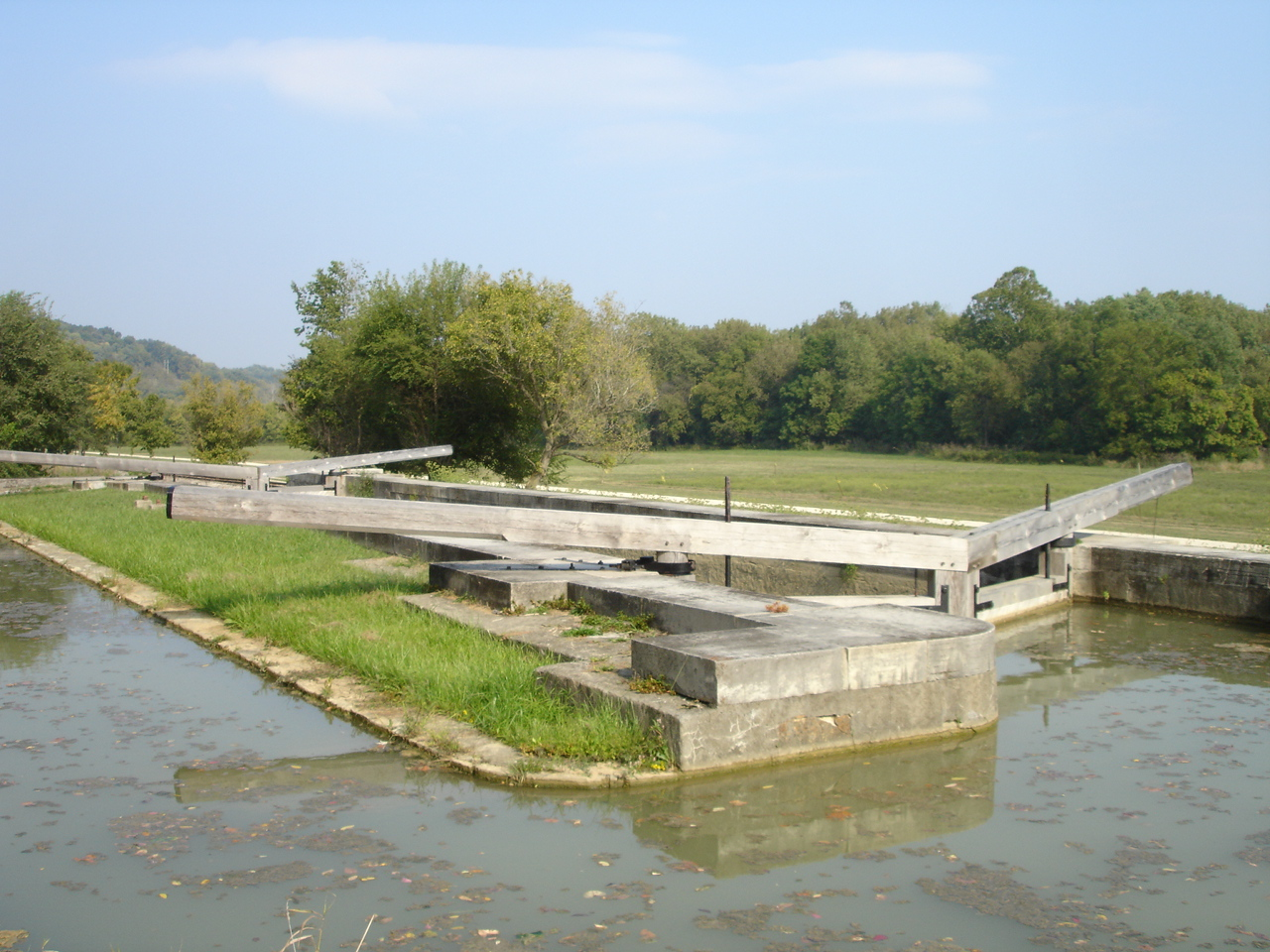
Whitewater Canal, in Franklin County

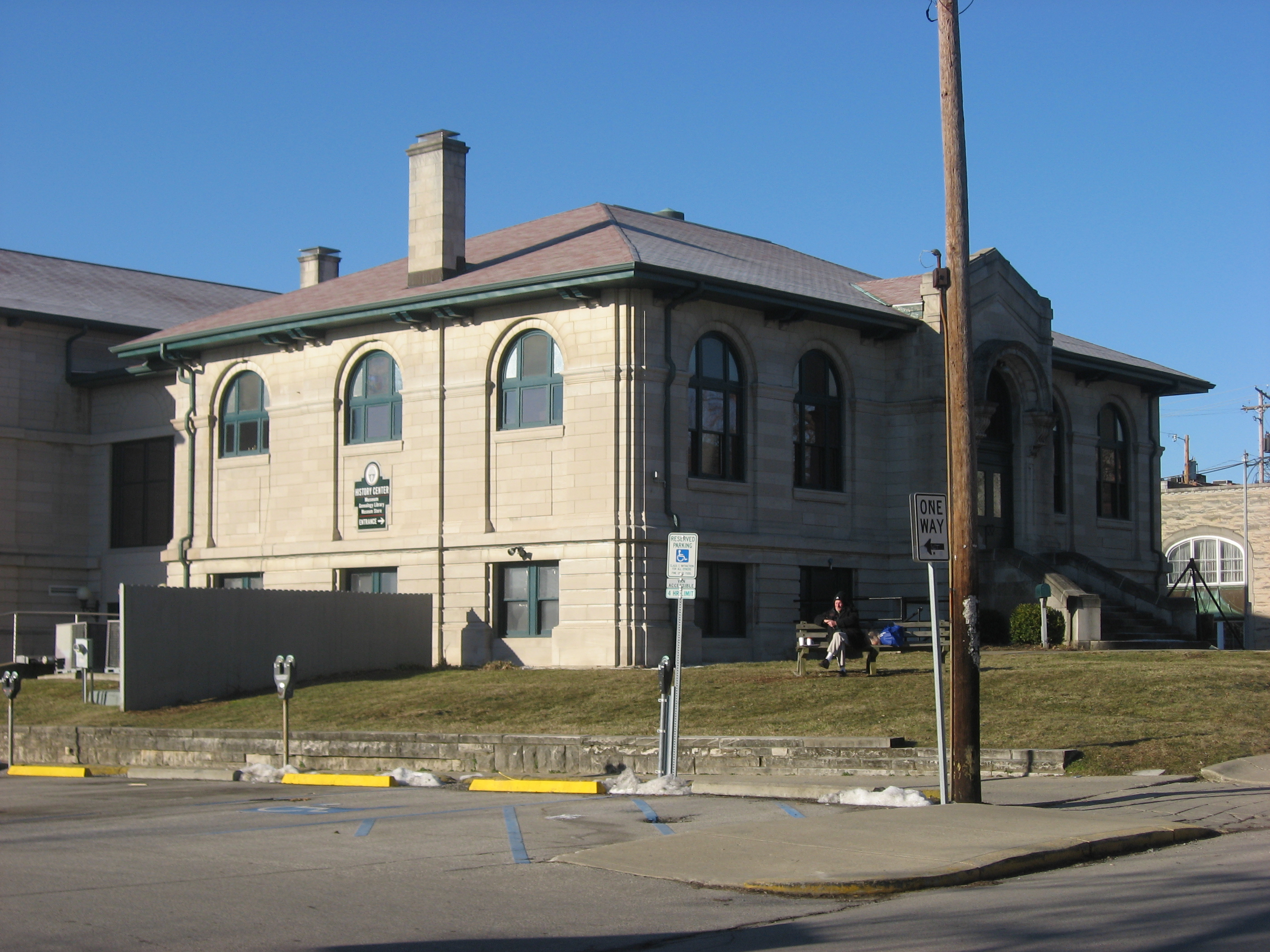
Monroe County's Carnegie Library, in Monroe County

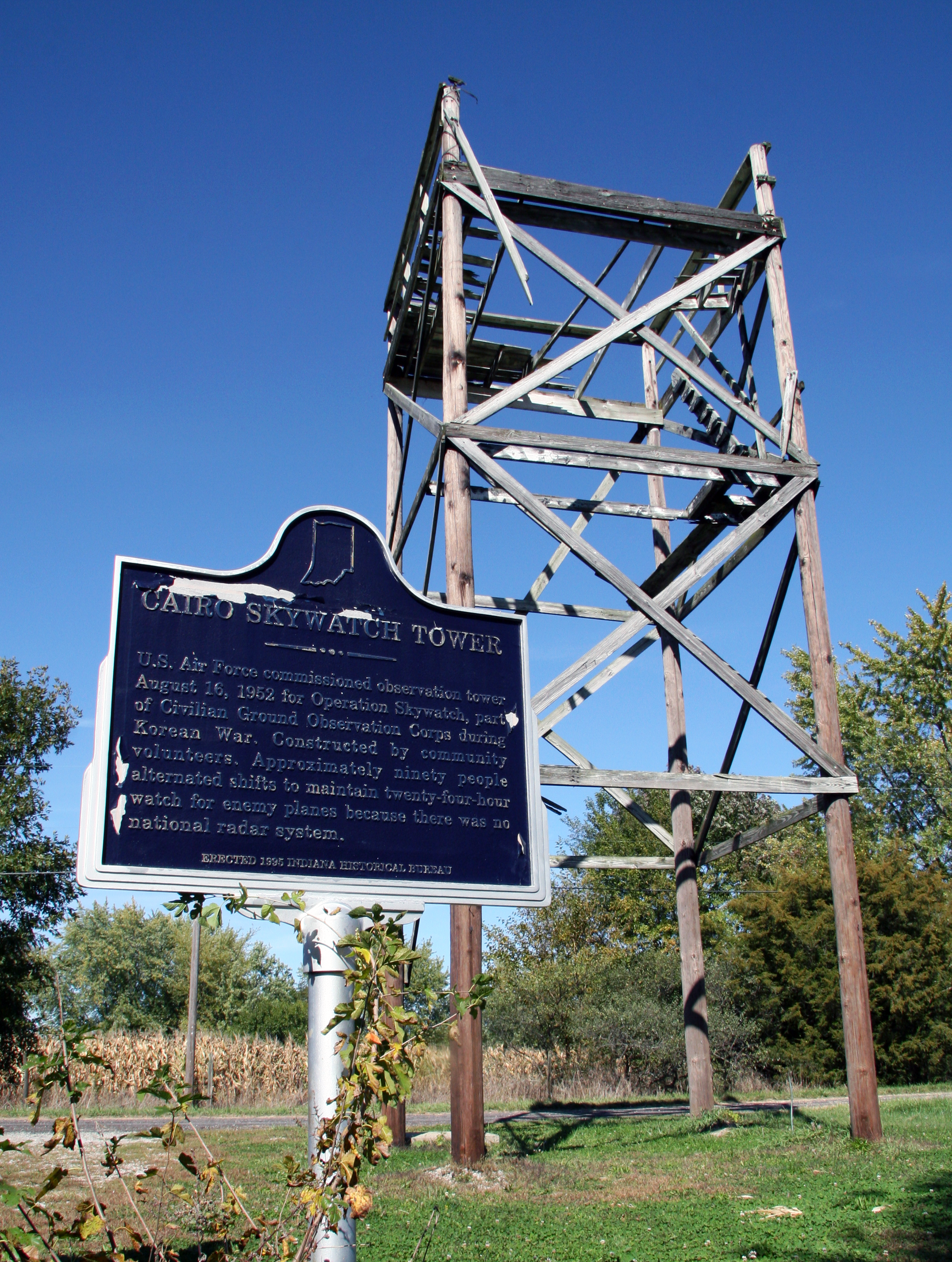
Cairo Skywatch Tower, in Tippecanoe County

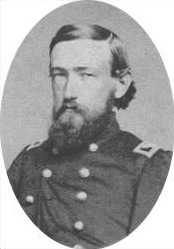
Brig. General Benjamin Harrison 1833–1901, in Marion County

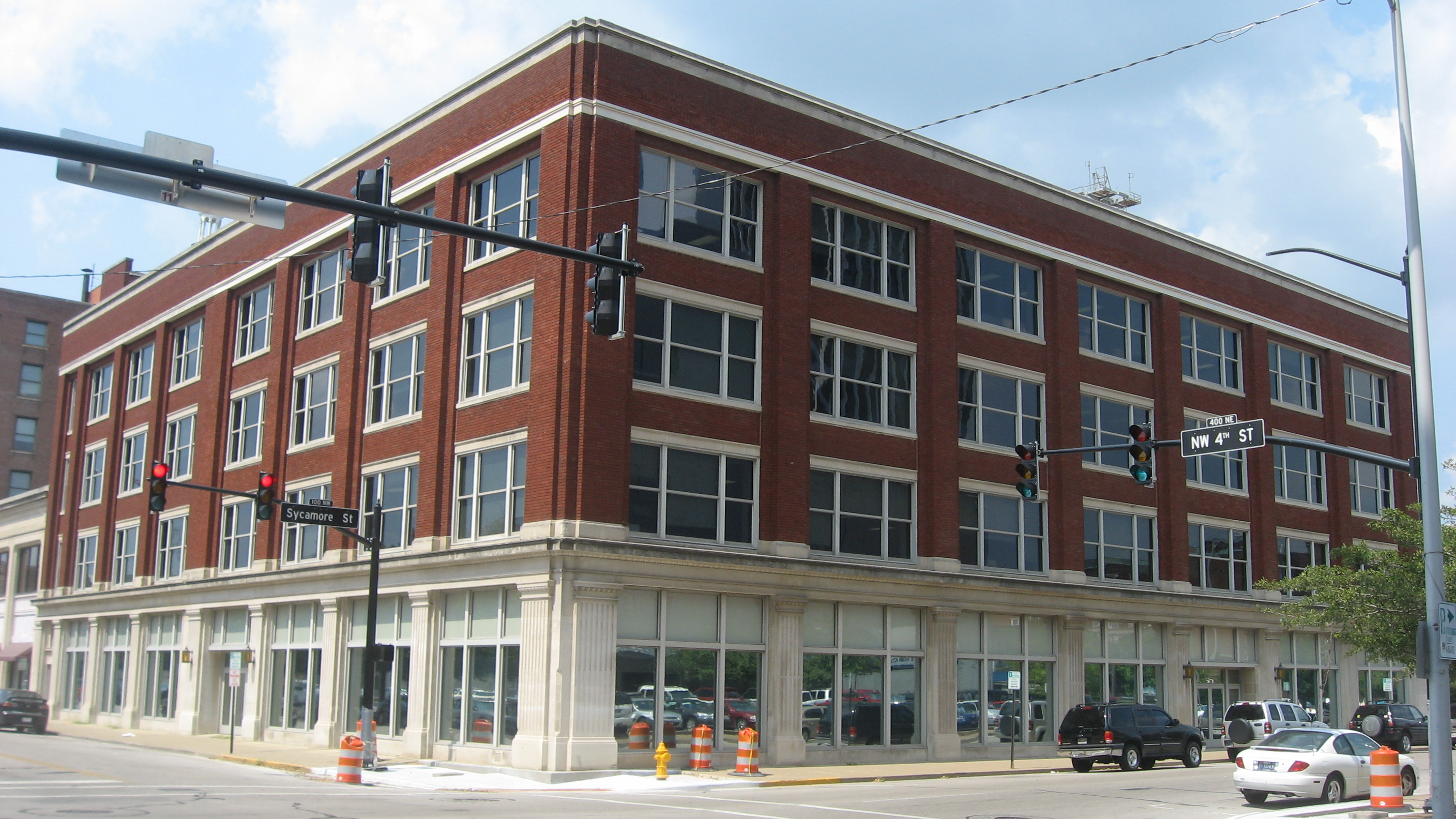
McCurdy-Sears Building, in Vanderburgh County

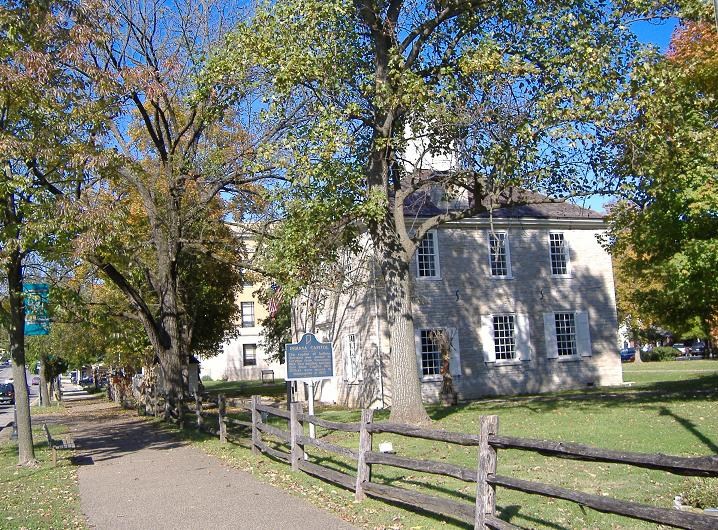
First State Capital, in Harrison County

	County	# of Sites	Oldest	Newest
1	Adams	2	1977	2006
2	Allen	5	1963	2003
3	Bartholomew	10	1988	2013
4	Benton	3	1966	1999
5	Blackford	3	1989	2022
6	Boone	9	1961	2021
7	Brown	6	1992	2023
8	Carroll	6	1963	2021
9	Cass	1	1966	1966
10	Clark	17	1962	2022
11	Clay	4	1999	2022
12	Clinton	1	2018	2018
13	Crawford	4	1992	2006
14	Daviess	10	1966	2007
15	Dearborn	1	1999	1999
16	Decatur	5	1980	2014
17	DeKalb	7	1992	2023
18	Delaware	7	1981	2022
19	Dubois	2	2018	2021
20	Elkhart	14	1966	2009
21	Fayette	1	1966	1966
22	Floyd	23	1966	2021
23	Fountain	6	1970	2023
24	Franklin	14	1949	2018
25	Fulton	1	1949	1949
26	Gibson	5	2002	2022
27	Grant	11	1947	2022
28	Greene	2	1998	1998
29	Hamilton	9	1994	2022
30	Hancock	3	1966	2020
31	Harrison	23	1948	2016
32	Hendricks	7	1972	2017
33	Henry	2	1966	1976
34	Howard	2	1966	2021
35	Huntington	12	1949	2021
36	Jackson	8	1951	2022
37	Jasper	6	1964	2008
38	Jay	0	N/A	N/A
39	Jefferson	16	1963	2022
40	Jennings	8	1966	2020
41	Johnson	5	1992	2023
42	Knox	10	1966	2021
43	Kosciusko	8	1962	2007
44	LaGrange	1	1966	1966
45	Lake	16	1949	2025
46	LaPorte	10	1962	2018
47	Lawrence	4	1966	2005
48	Madison	7	1966	2022
49	Marion	109	1946	2023
50	Marshall	3	1949	2011
51	Martin	1	1966	1966
52	Miami	3	1992	2023
53	Monroe	11	1996	2020
54	Montgomery	11	1962	2020
55	Morgan	6	1957	2020
56	Newton	5	1966	2021
57	Noble	7	1963	2014
58	Ohio	3	1961	2021
59	Orange	3	1961	2004
60	Owen	3	1966	2008
61	Parke	15	1966	2012
62	Perry	4	1961	1966
63	Pike	3	1966	1992
64	Porter	5	1995	2018
65	Posey	5	1966	2006
66	Pulaski	1	1988	1988
67	Putnam	3	1966	2006
68	Randolph	5	2005	2016
69	Ripley	10	1949	2022
70	Rush	4	1969	1969
71	St. Joseph	23	1963	2021
72	Scott	16	1963	2004
73	Shelby	5	1951	2011
74	Spencer	4	1992	2001
75	Starke	1	2000	2000
76	Steuben	3	1976	2022
77	Sullivan	8	1972	2008
78	Switzerland	4	1966	2022
79	Tippecanoe	11	1953	2014
80	Tipton	2	1966	1994
81	Union	2	1963	2017
82	Vanderburgh	13	1947	2023
83	Vermillion	6	1960	2018
84	Vigo	15	1966	2023
85	Wabash	8	1962	2007
86	Warren	2	1992	2002
87	Warrick	1	1966	1966
88	Washington	6	1963	2021
89	Wayne	14	1962	2021
90	Wells	2	2001	2019
91	White	4	1961	1992
92	Whitley	5	1959	2013
Total:		517	1946	2009

== See also ==
- National Register of Historic Places listings in Indiana

== Notes ==
a: The Indiana Historical Bureau does not provide the year of placement for a few markers; some of these markers have a range of possible years, and others have no years at all and are presented with a question mark. For the purposes of the "Oldest" and "Newest" columns, these markers are not considered; each county's entries are those of the markers with the oldest and newest certain dates. The only exceptions are the "N/A" entries given for counties with no markers at all.
