= List of Indiana state historical markers in Vanderburgh County =

Location of Vanderburgh County in Indiana

This is a list of the Indiana state historical markers in Vanderburgh County.

This is intended to be a complete list of the official state historical markers placed in Vanderburgh County, Indiana, United States by the Indiana Historical Bureau. The locations of the historical markers and their latitude and longitude coordinates are included below when available, along with their names, years of placement, and topics as recorded by the Historical Bureau. There are 11 historical markers located in Vanderburgh County.

== Historical markers ==
Marker title	Image	Year placed	Location	Topics
Wabash And Erie Canal		1947	Southeastern corner of the Old Courthouse lawn at 5th and Vine Streets in Evansville; 37°58′26″N 87°34′18″W	Transportation, Business, Industry, and Labor
First SWCD In Indiana		1976	Boonville-New Harmony Road at the Vanderburgh County 4-H Center in Darmstadt; 38°5′32″N 87°33′42″W	Agriculture, Nature and Natural Disasters
P-47 Thunderbolt Factory		1995	5401 N. U.S. Route 41 on the eastern side of the highway at the visitors' entrance to the former Whirlpool factory, near Evansville; 38°1′32″N 87°32′17″W	Military, Business, Industry, and Labor
Evansville Cotton Mill		1996	Bristol Myers Squibb facility along St. Joseph Avenue (State Road 62) south of Ohio Street in Evansville; 37°58′34″N 87°36′3″W	Business, Industry, and Labor, Women
McCurdy-Sears Building		1999	In a parking lot at the junction of 5th and Sycamore Streets by a rear entrance to the McCurdy-Sears Building, in Evansville; 37°58′22″N 87°34′16.6″W	Business, Industry, and Labor, Buildings and Architecture
Ohio River Levee		2003	Eastern portion of Dress Plaza along the Ohio River in downtown Evansville, near the intersection of Walnut Street and Riverside Drive; 37°58′4.8″N 87°34′29.6″W	Nature and Natural Disasters, Government Institutions
Sheriff's Residence and Jail		2007	208 NW 4th St., Evansville; 37°58′24.4″N 87°34′22″W	
Glenn A Black (1900–1964)		2017	8215 Pollack Ave., Evansville; 37°56′51″N 87°27′09″W	American Indian; Early Settlement & Exploration; Science & Technology
Lincoln Gardens		2020	Evansville African American Museum, 579 S. Garvin St., Evansville; 37°58′13.3″N 87°33′24.2″W	African American, Historic District, Neighborhoods, and Towns
Mary Harris "Mother" Jones		2022	Shirley James Gateway Plaza, located at 298 S. 7th Ave., Evansville; 37°58′38″N 87°35′09″W	Business, Industry, & Labor; Women
P-47 Thunderbolt Factory		2023	Evansville Wartime Museum, 7503 Petersburg Rd., Evansville; 38°02′31″N 87°32′13″W	Military; Business, Industry & Labor

== See also ==
- List of Indiana state historical markers
- National Register of Historic Places listings in Vanderburgh County, Indiana
