= List of Indiana state historical markers in Blackford County =

Location of Blackford County in Indiana

This is a list of the Indiana state historical markers in Blackford County.

This is intended to be a complete list of the official state historical markers placed in Blackford County, Indiana, United States by the Indiana Historical Bureau. The locations of the historical markers and their latitude and longitude coordinates are included below when available, along with their names, years of placement, and topics as recorded by the Historical Bureau. There are 3 historical markers located in Blackford County.

== Historical markers ==
Marker title	Image	Year placed	Location	Topics
Godfroy Reserve		1989	Southeastern corner of the junction of Huntington (State Road 18) and Main Streets in Montpelier; 40°33′14″N 85°16′40″W	Early Settlement and Exploration, American Indian/Native American
Blackford County Courthouse		1994	110 W. Washington Street at the southern entrance to the courthouse in Hartford City; 40°27′6″N 85°22′5″W	Buildings and Architecture, Government Institutions
Sigma Phi Gamma sorority		2022	Sigma Phi Gamma Founders Park, 700 N. Richmond St., Hartford City; 40°27′38″N 85°22′35″W	Women

== See also ==
- List of Indiana state historical markers
- National Register of Historic Places listings in Blackford County, Indiana
