= Stone Head, Indiana =

- Unincorporated community
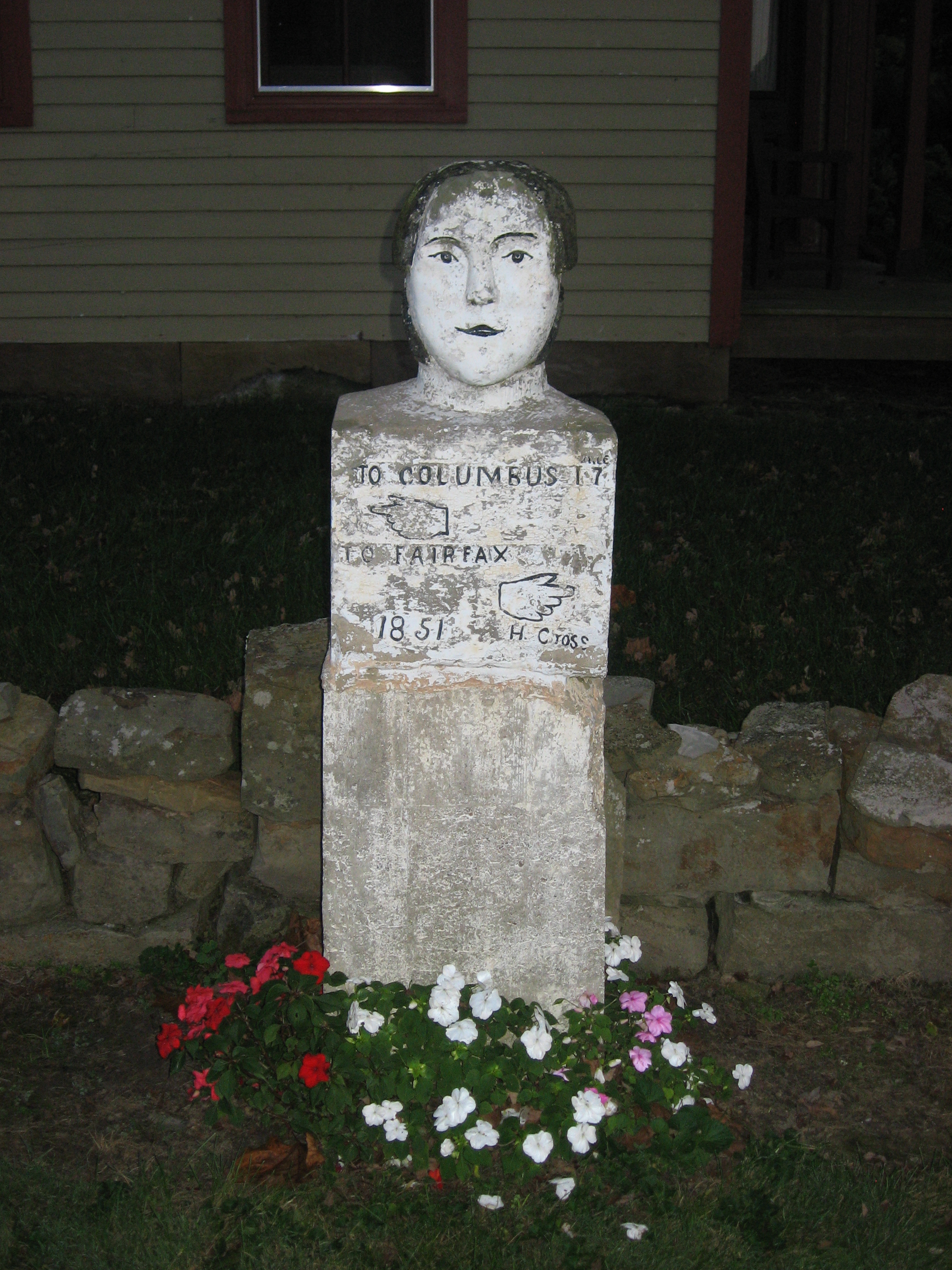
- The namesake stone head

- Brown County's location in Indiana

- Location in Brown County
- Coordinates: 39°07′48″N 86°09′32″W
- Country: United States
- State: Indiana
- County: Brown
- Township: Van Buren
- Elevation: 584 ft (178 m)
- Time zone: UTC-5 (Eastern (EST))
  - Summer (DST): UTC-4 (EDT)
- ZIP code: 47201
- Area codes: 812 & 930
- FIPS code: 18-73448
- GNIS feature ID: 444206

Stone Head is an unincorporated community in Van Buren Township, Brown County, in the U.S. state of Indiana.

== History ==
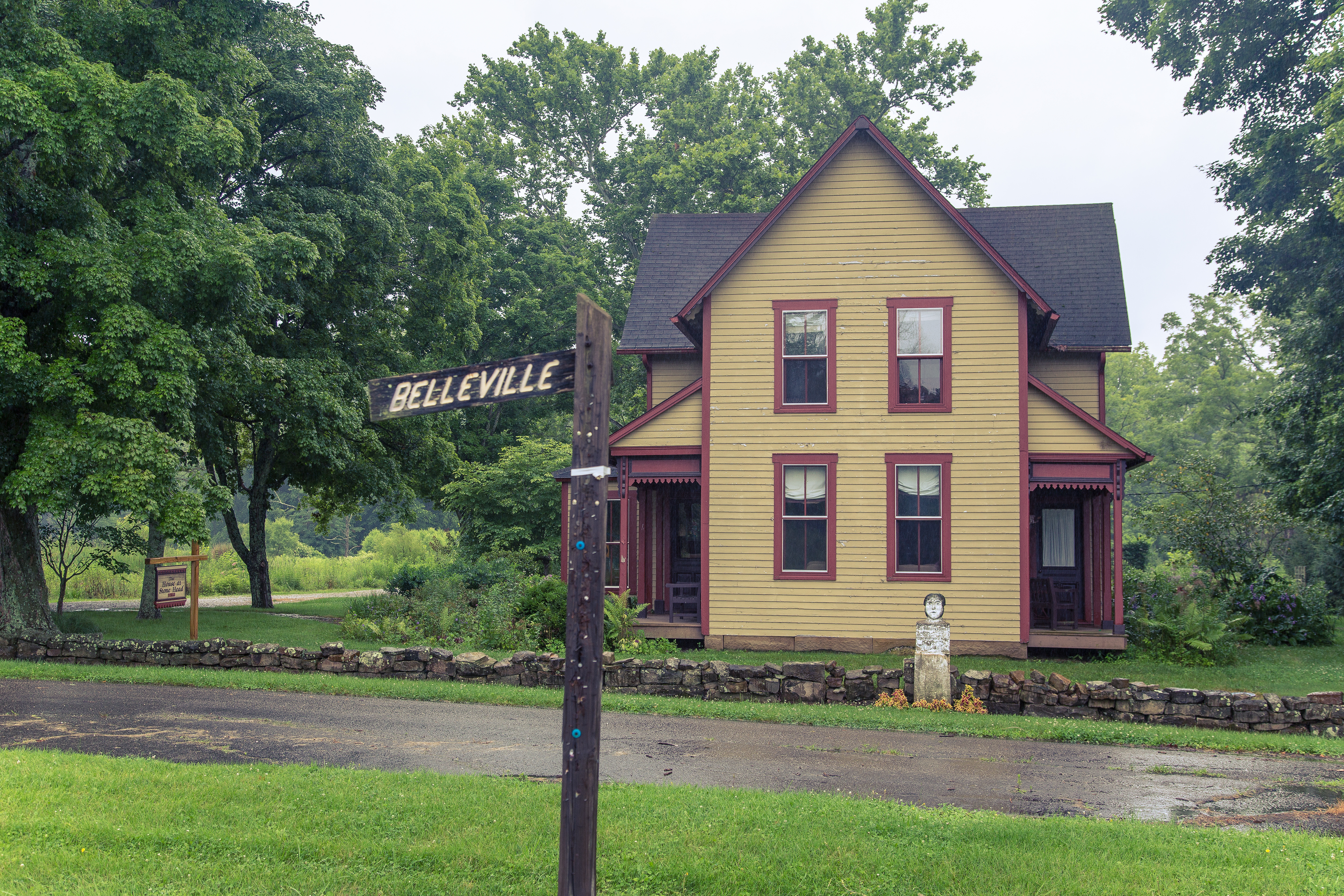
Stone Head, Indiana

Stone Head was named after the historic 1851 mile marker sculpture in the shape of a head. It was carved by Henry Cross. Stone Head contained a post office from 1890 until 1891.

=== Sculpture ===
In 1974 the entire piece, the base and the head, came up missing. Police found it four months later in an apartment in Indianapolis. Two teenagers were using it as a hat rack, according to a story published in the Brown County Democrat. The Thomas A. Hendricks House and Stone Head Road Marker was listed on the National Register of Historic Places in 1984.

In November 2016, the carving was beheaded. It has not been found and no arrests have been made. A monument honoring Henry Cross and destroyed Stone Head was placed in October 2017 by Casey Winningham, an Indiana master stone carver.

Kissing the stone head was said to bring good luck.
