= List of Indiana state historical markers in Clinton County =

This is a list of the Indiana state historical markers in Clinton County.

This is intended to be a complete list of the official state historical markers placed in Clinton County, Indiana, United States by the Indiana Historical Bureau. The locations of the historical markers and their latitude and longitude coordinates are included below when available, along with their names, years of placement, and topics as recorded by the Historical Bureau. There is just one historical marker located in Clinton County.

== Historical marker ==
Marker title	Image	Year placed	Location	Topics
Everett N. Case 1900-1966		2018	Frankfort High School, 1 S. Maish Rd., Frankfort; 40°28′15″N 86°48′52″W	Sports

== See also ==
- List of Indiana state historical markers
