= List of Indiana state historical markers in Starke County =

Location of Starke County in Indiana

This is a list of the Indiana state historical markers in Starke County.

This is intended to be a detailed table of the official state historical marker placed in Starke County, Indiana, United States by the Indiana Historical Bureau. The location of the historical marker and its latitude and longitude coordinates are included below when available, along with its name, year of placement, and topics as recorded by the Historical Bureau. There is 1 historical marker located in Starke County.

== Historical markers ==
Marker title	Image	Year placed	Location	Topics
La Salle in Indiana		2000	In the parking lot for the Turkey Foot Conservation Area, south of U.S. Route 30 on County Road 50 E/N. Range Road, 0.6 miles east of the La Porte County line and the Kankakee River, near Davis Station and Hamlet; 41°23′47″N 86°41′55″W	Early Settlement and Exploration

== See also ==
- List of Indiana state historical markers
- National Register of Historic Places listings in Starke County, Indiana
