= List of Indiana state historical markers in Jefferson County =

Location of Jefferson County in Indiana

This is a list of the Indiana state historical markers in Jefferson County.

This is intended to be a complete list of the official state historical markers placed in Jefferson County, Indiana, United States by the Indiana Historical Bureau. The locations of the historical markers and their latitude and longitude coordinates are included below when available, along with their names, years of placement, and topics as recorded by the Historical Bureau. There are 16 historical markers located in Jefferson County.

== Historical markers ==
| Marker title | Image | Year placed | Location | Topics |
|---|---|---|---|---|
| Morgan's Raid July 8–13, 1863 | | 1963 | State Road 7 in Dupont; 38°53′19″N 85°31′9″W | Military |
| James F.D. Lanier 1800-1881 | | 1963 | 511 First at the Elm Street junction near the Ohio River at the Lanier Mansion State Historic Site in Madison; 38°44′7″N 85°23′7″W | Military, Business, Industry, and Labor |
| First Chartered Bank in Indiana | | 1966 | 308 Jefferson Street in Madison; 38°44′8″N 85°22′37″W | Business, Industry, and Labor |
| Harvey Washington Wiley, M.D. 1844-1930 | | 1981 | Southwestern corner of the junction of State Road 256 and County Road 850W near Kent; 38°44′15″N 85°32′38.4″W | Science, Medicine, and Inventions |
| Madison Historic District | | 1992 | Junction of Vaughn Drive and Jefferson Street at the Ohio riverside walk in Madison; 38°43′58″N 85°22′38″W | Historic District, Neighborhoods, and Towns, Buildings and Architecture |
| Madison Hill Incline and Cut | | 1996 | Near the southwestern corner of a railroad bridge at 1001 W. Main Street at the McIntire Street junction in Madison; 38°44′21.4″N 85°23′47.6″W | Business, Industry, and Labor, Transportation |
| Alois O. Bachman | | 1999 | Southeastern corner of the Alois O. Bachman Bridge at State Road 7 near Hanging Rock Hill at the junction of Presbyterian and Cragmont Streets in Madison; 38°44′28″N 85°23′36″W | Military |
| Michael C. Garber | | 2004 | Offices of The Madison Courier at 310 West Street in Madison; 38°44′8″N 85°22′48″W | Politics, Military, Newspapers and Media |
| Lyman Hoyt | | 2004 | 7147 W. State Road 250 near Lancaster; 38°49′56″N 85°31′14″W | Underground Railroad, African American, Politics, Buildings and Architecture |
| Eleutherian College | | 2004 | 6927 W. State Road 250 near Lancaster; 38°49′52″N 85°30′58″W | Underground Railroad, African American, Education, Women |
| Georgetown | | 2004 | Junction of Jefferson and Fifth Streets in Madison; 38°44′22.8″N 85°22′37.6″W | Underground Railroad, African American, Historic District, Neighborhoods, and Towns |
| Irene Dunne | | 2006 | 105 E. Main Street in Madison; 38°44′11″N 85°22′48″W | Arts and Culture, Women, Politics |
| John H. and Sarah Tibbets | | 2006 | In front of the Tibbets House at 6810 N. Boyd Road near Madison; 38°50′10″N 85°31′4″W | Underground Railroad, African American, Religion, Education |
| Chapman Harris | | 2016 | Intersection of Eagle Hollow Rd. and SR 56 (Ohio River Scenic Byway) just east of Madison; 38°44′10.6″N 85°20′20″W | African American, Underground Railroad, Politics |
| Samuel Woodfill | | 2018 | Grandview Memorial Gardens, 9301 US-421, Madison; 38°52′25″N 85°22′32″W | Military |
| Eagle Cotton Mill | | 2022 | 108 St. Michaels Ave., Madison; 38°43′56″N 85°22′18″W | Business, Industry, & Labor; Buildings & Architecture; Women |

== See also ==
- List of Indiana state historical markers
- National Register of Historic Places listings in Jefferson County, Indiana
