= Thomas A. Hendricks House =

Historic house in Indiana, United States

- Thomas A. Hendricks House and Stone Head Road Marker
- U.S. National Register of Historic Places
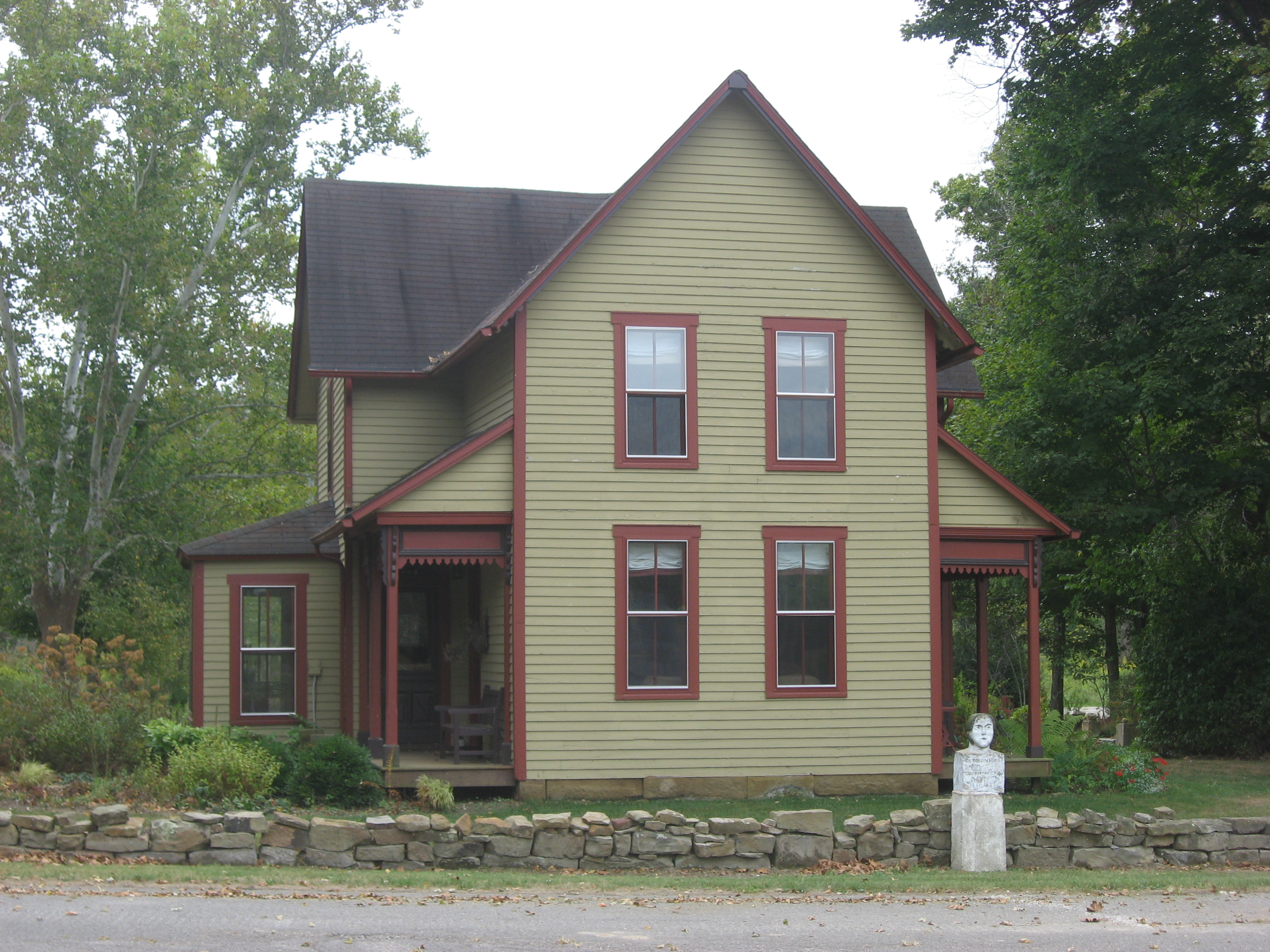
- Thomas A. Hendricks House and Stone Head Road Marker, September 2010

- Location within Brown County, Indiana Location within Indiana Location within the United States
- Location: State Road 135 and Bellsville Rd. at Stone Head, Van Buren Township, Brown County, Indiana
- Coordinates: 39°7′47″N 86°9′31″W
- Area: less than one acre
- Built: 1851, 1891
- Built by: Cross, Henry; Hendricks, Thomas A.
- NRHP reference No.: 84000450
- Added to NRHP: December 6, 1984

Thomas A. Hendricks House and Stone Head Road Marker is a historic home and road marker located at Stone Head, Indiana. The house was built in 1891, and is a two-story, T-shaped frame dwelling. It rests on a sandstone foundation and features three prominent projecting gables. The Stone Head Road Marker was erected in 1851. It was carved of sandstone by local gravestone carver Henry Cross.

It was listed on the National Register of Historic Places in 1984.

== Gallery ==
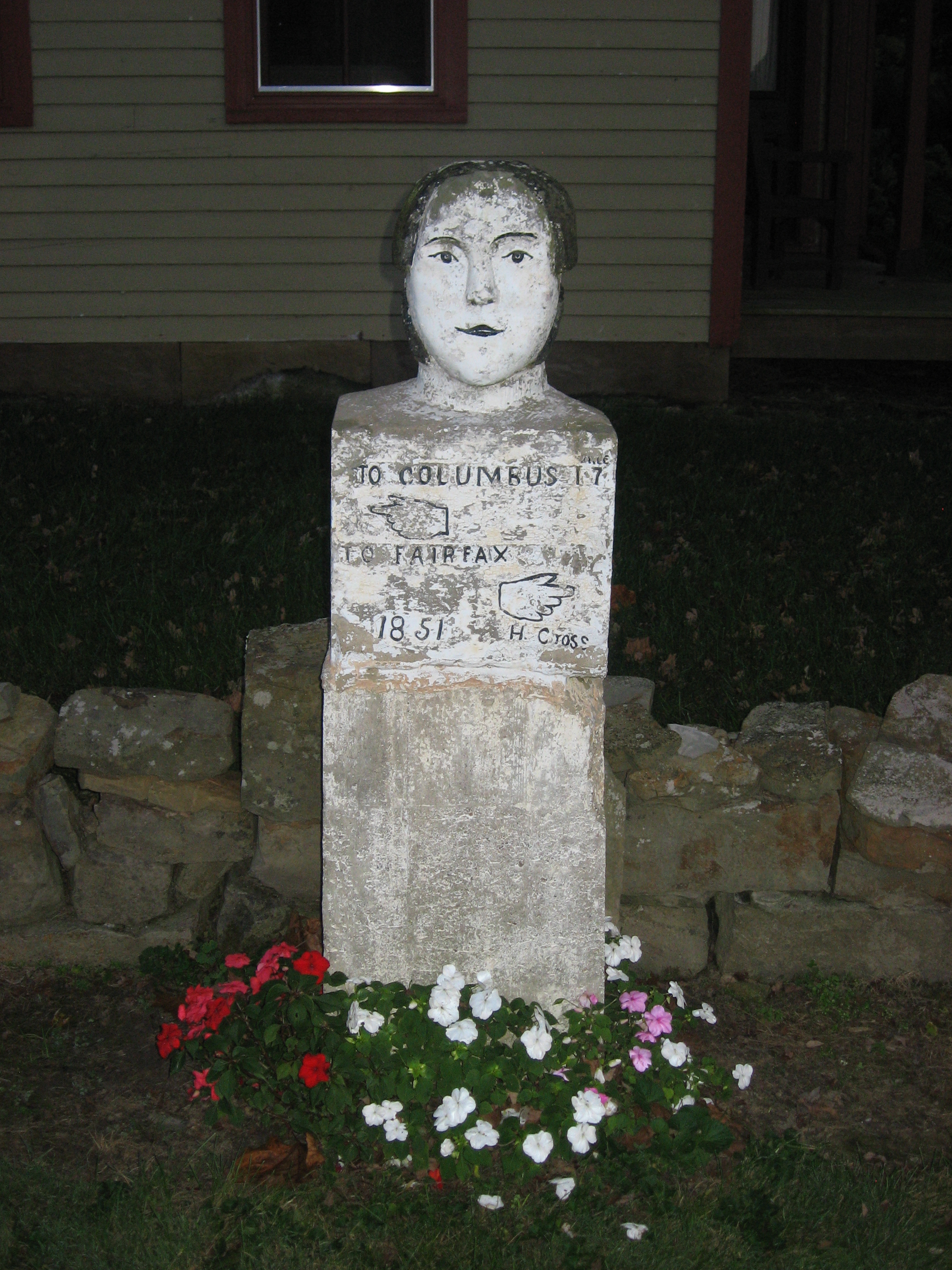
Stone Head marker

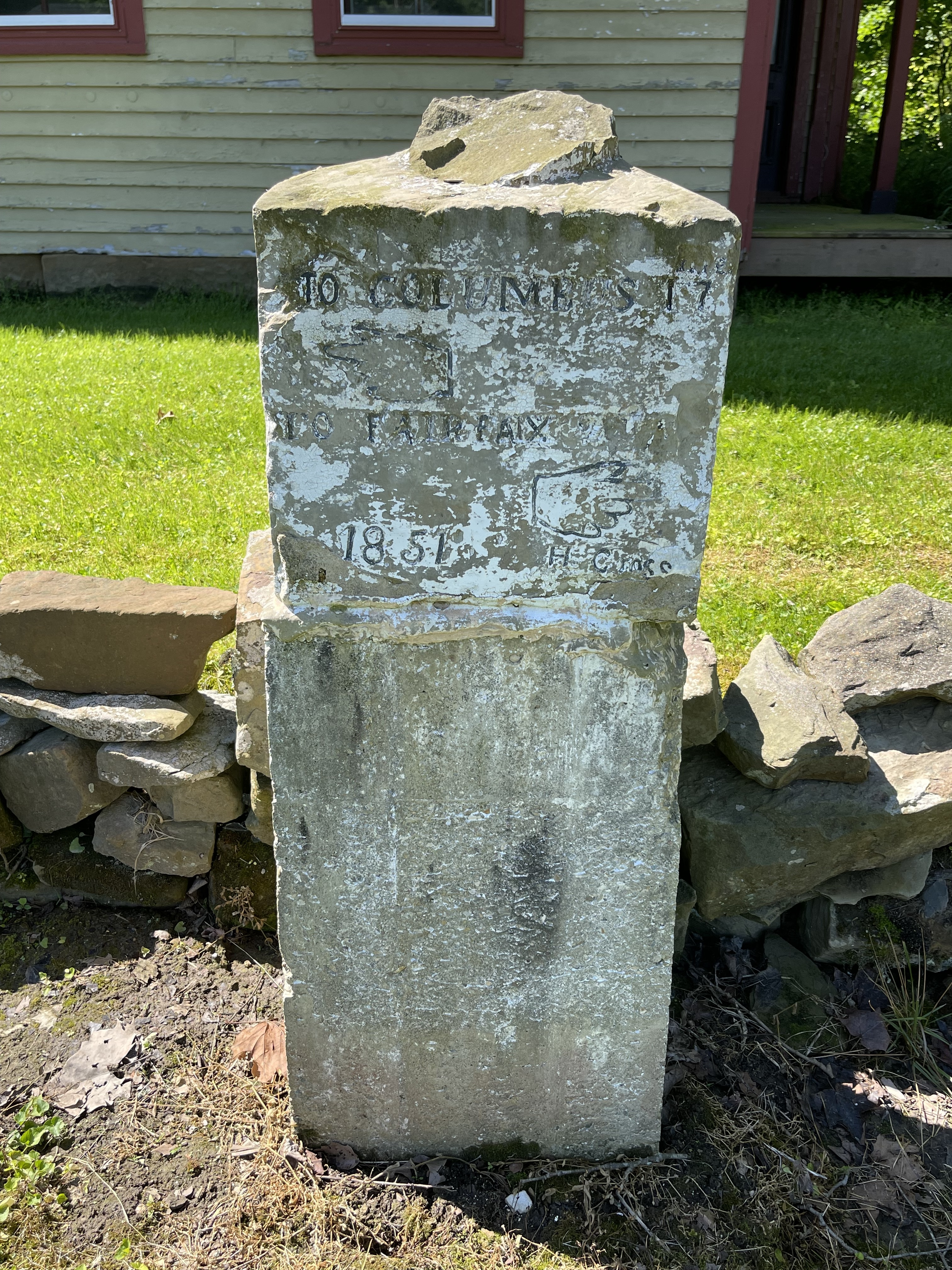
The marker with head missing in 2022

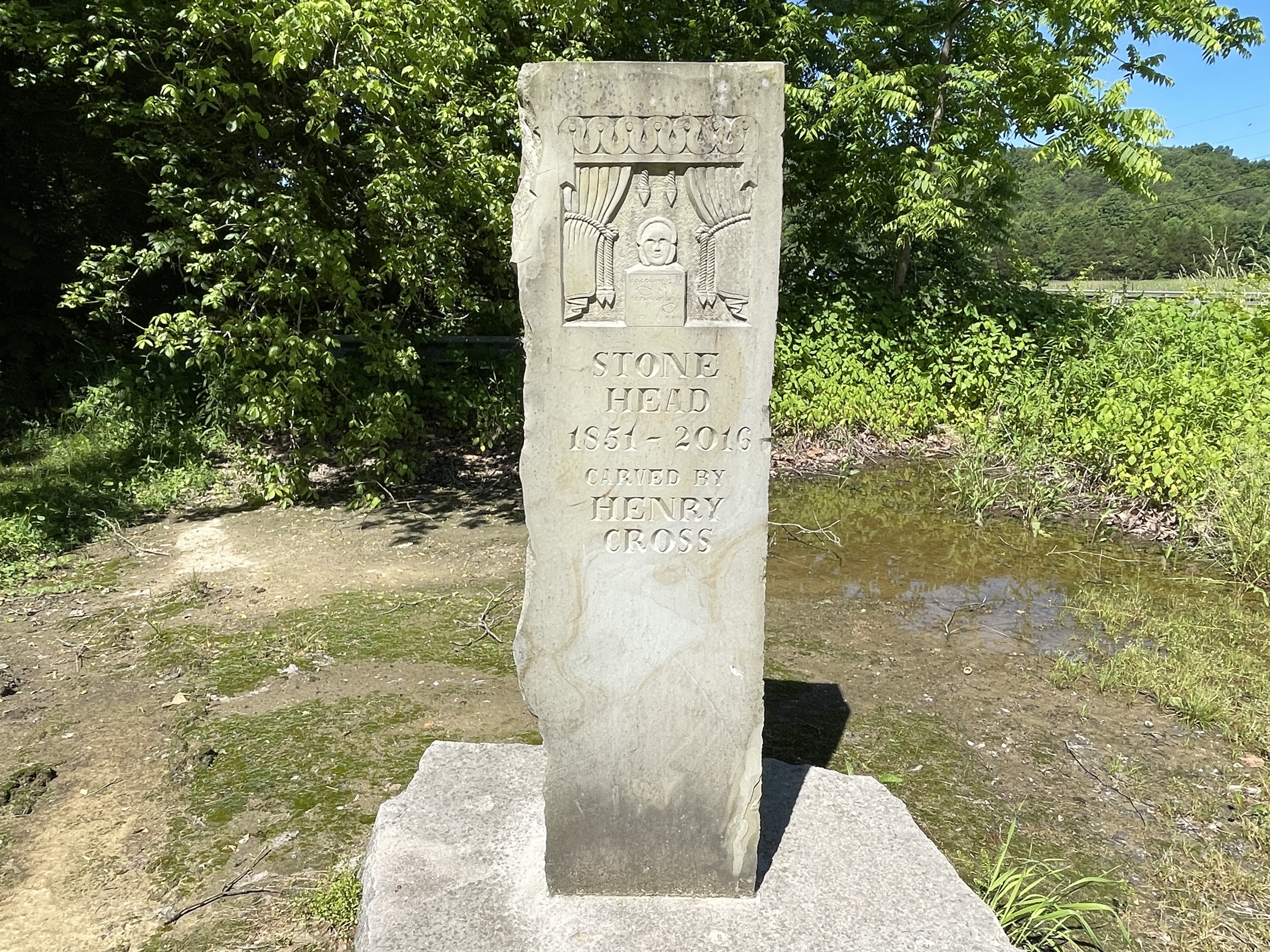
Monument to the Stone Head at the Stone Head Road marker
