= F.P. Taggart Store =

- U.S. National Register of Historic Places
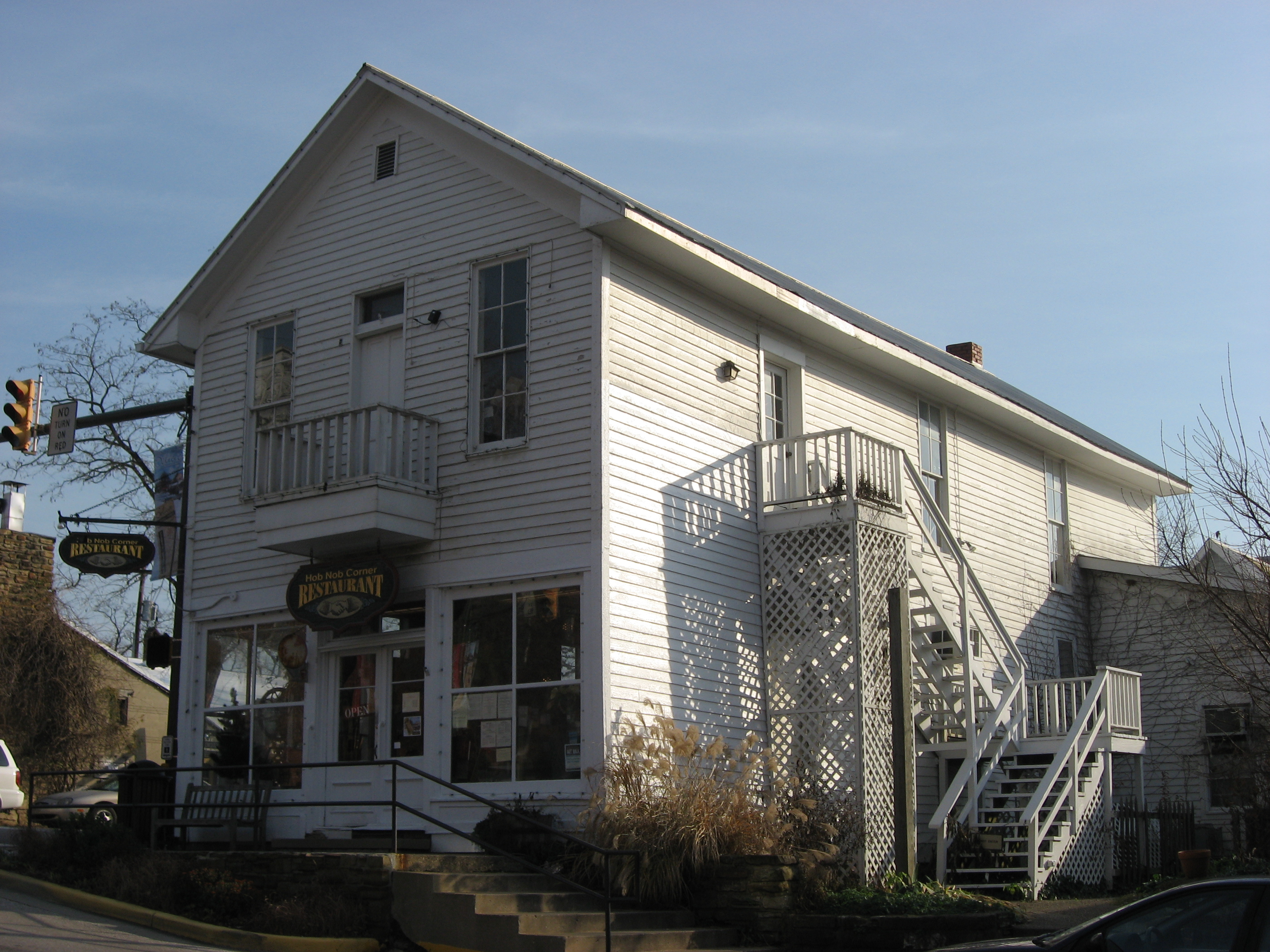
- F.P. Taggart Store, December 2011

- Location within Brown County, Indiana Location within Indiana Location within the United States
- Location: Main and VanBuren Sts., Nashville, Indiana
- Coordinates: 39°12′25″N 86°14′52″W
- Area: less than one acre
- Built: c. 1870-1875
- Architectural style: Post-Colonial
- NRHP reference No.: 83003559
- Added to NRHP: December 22, 1983

F.P. Taggart Store, also known as the Hobnob Corner Restaurant, is a historic general store located at Nashville, Indiana. It was built between 1870 and 1875, and is a two-story, balloon frame building measuring 24 feet wide by 90 feet deep. The interior retains a number of original features including oak pane flooring.

It was listed on the National Register of Historic Places in 1983.
