= Brown County Courthouse Historic District =

Historic district in Indiana, United States

- U.S. National Register of Historic Places
- U.S. Historic district
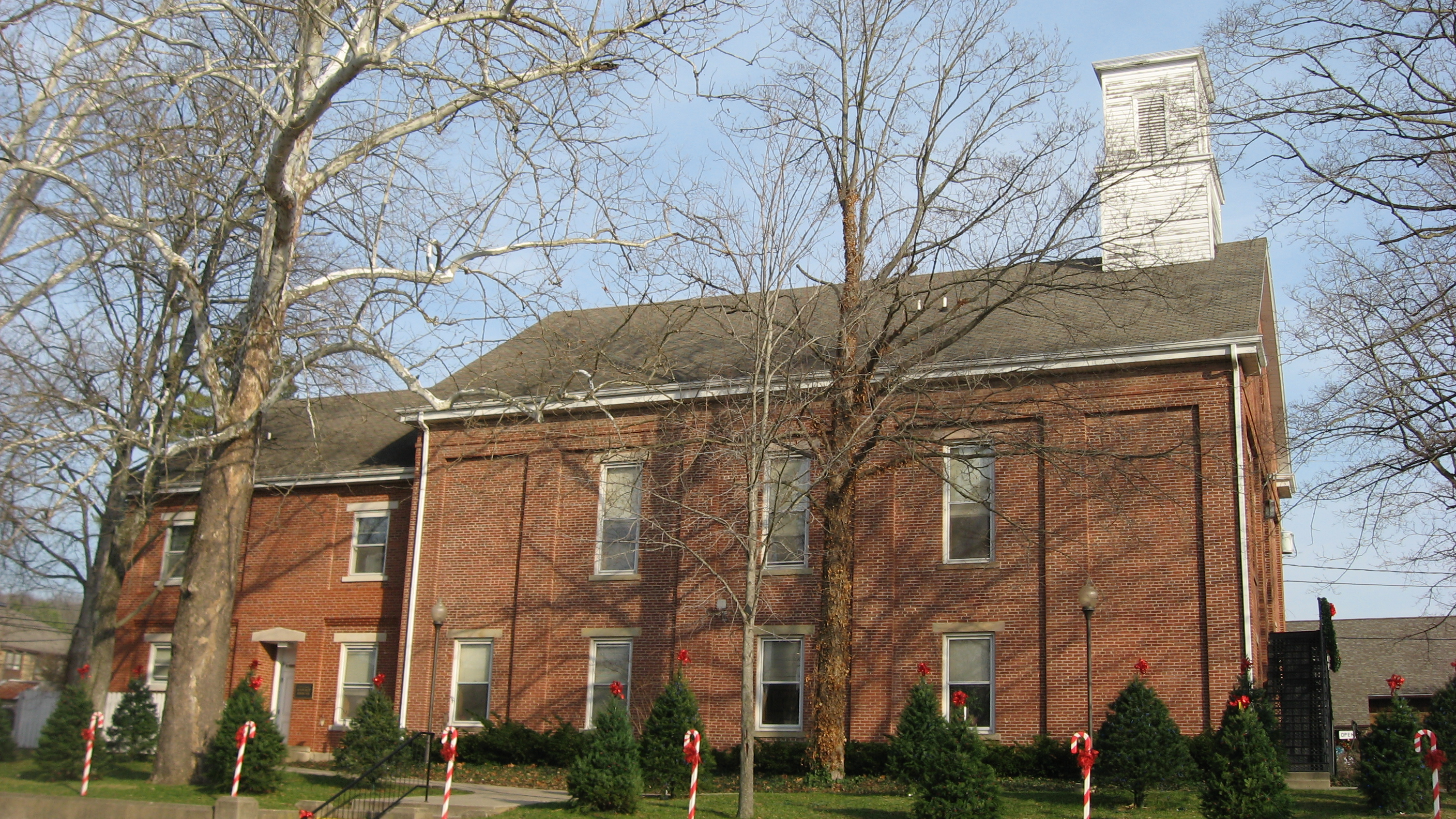
- Brown County Courthouse, December 2011

- Location within Brown County, Indiana Location within Indiana Location within the United States
- Location: Courthouse, Old Log Jail, and the Historical Society Museum Bldg., Nashville, Indiana
- Coordinates: 39°12′28″N 86°14′48″W
- Area: 1 acre (0.40 ha)
- Built: 1873-1874, 1879
- Architectural style: Greek Revival, Log Construction
- NRHP reference No.: 83000050
- Added to NRHP: July 21, 1983

Brown County Courthouse Historic District is a historic courthouse and national historic district located at Nashville, Indiana. It encompasses three contributing buildings: the courthouse, Old Log Jail, and the Historical Society Museum Building. The Brown County Courthouse was built in 1873–1874, and is a two-story, Greek Revival style brick building. It has a gable roof and two-tiered, flat-roofed frame tower. The Old Log Jail was built in 1879, and is a small two-story log building. It measures 12 feet by 20 feet, and was used as a jail until 1922. The Historical Society Museum Building, or Brown County Community Building, is a two-story, rectangular log building. It was moved to its present location in 1936–1937. The Works Progress Administration funded the reconstruction and remodeling of the building.

It was listed on the National Register of Historic Places in 1983.
