= McCurdy Building =

- McCurdy Building (Sears, Roebuck and Company Building)
- U.S. National Register of Historic Places
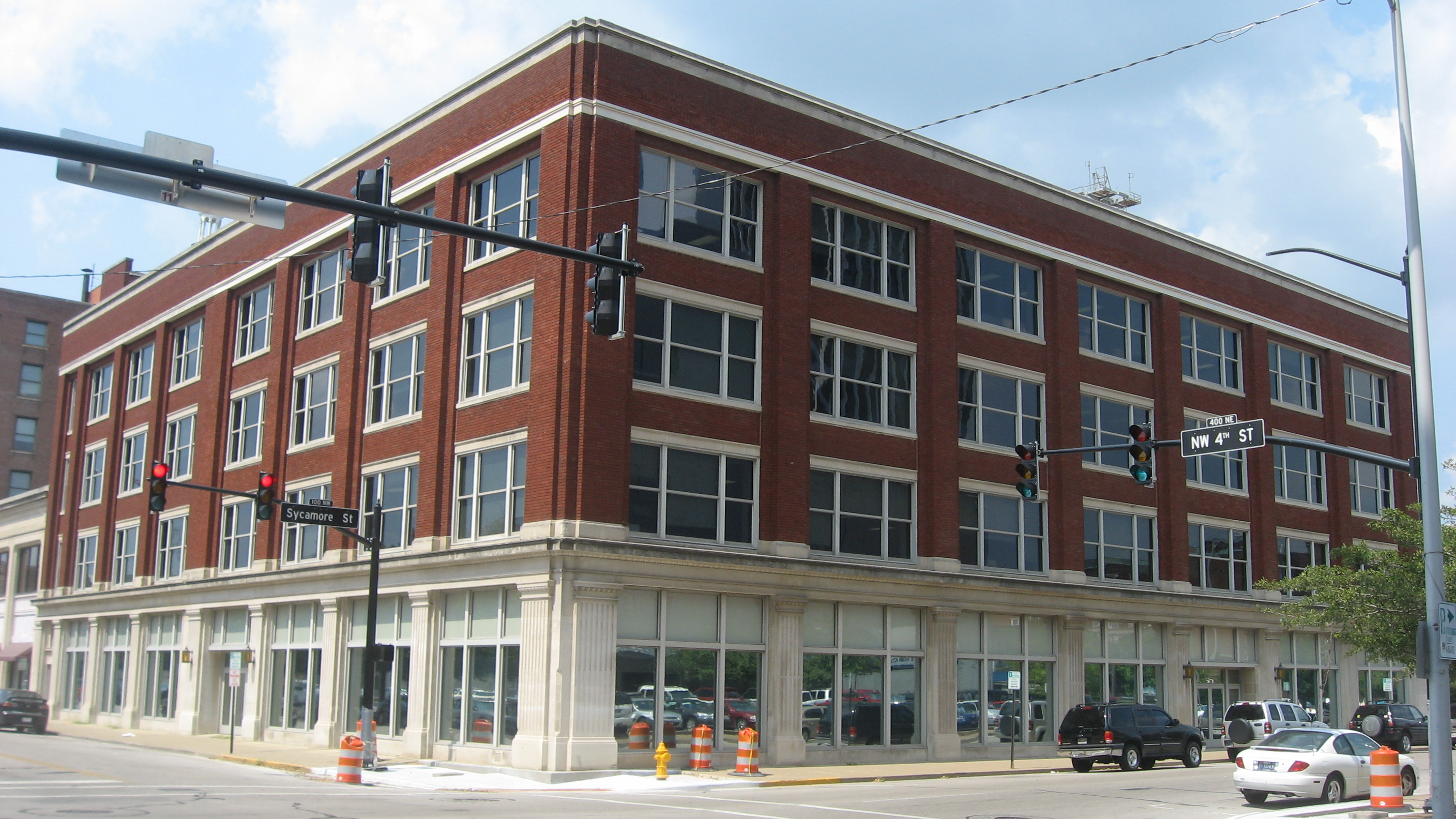
- McCurdy Building, July 2011

- Location within Indiana Location within the United States
- Location: 101 NW. 4th St., Evansville, Indiana
- Coordinates: 37°58′22″N 87°34′19″W
- Area: less than one acre
- Built: 1920
- NRHP reference No.: 79000050
- Added to NRHP: October 1, 1979

McCurdy Building, also known as the Sears, Roebuck and Company Building, is a historic commercial building located in downtown Evansville, Indiana. It was built in 1920, and is a four-story brick building. The first floor features large display windows framed with limestone pilasters. A two-story addition was constructed in 1937, later raised to four stories in 1946. A two-story limestone faced addition, known as The Annex, was constructed in 1943. In 1925, it was occupied by the first Sears store to operate as a direct retail business independent of a catalog department.

It was added to the National Register of Historic Places in 1979.
