= Nashville, Indiana =

- Town
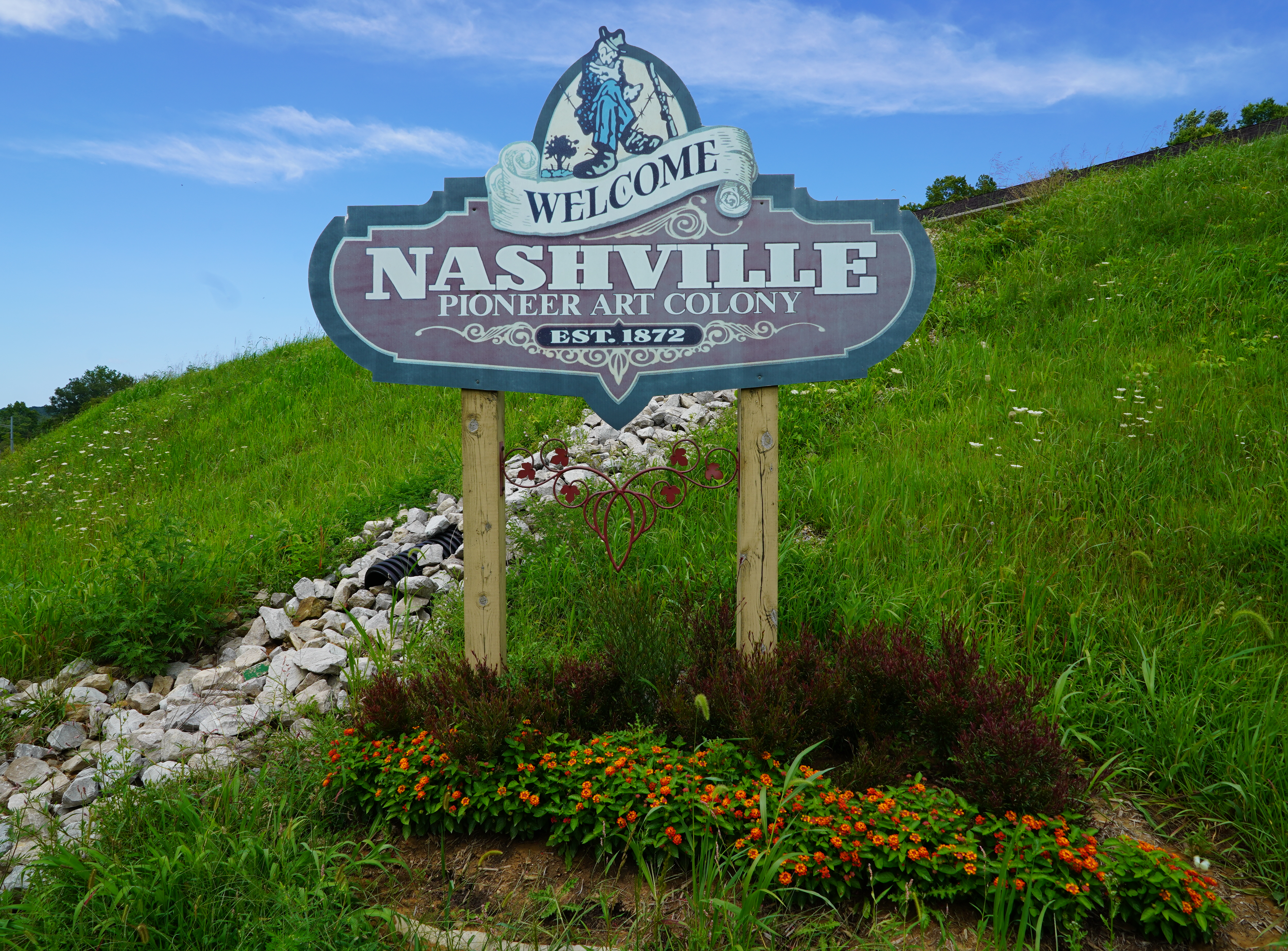
- Nashville, Indiana

- Flag Logo

- Location of Nashville in Brown County, Indiana.
- Coordinates: 39°12′36″N 86°14′40″W
- Country: United States
- State: Indiana
- County: Brown
- Township: Washington
- Founded: 1836
- Incorporated: 1872

Area
  - Total: 1.61 sq mi (4.16 km^{2})
  - Land: 1.60 sq mi (4.15 km^{2})
  - Water: 0.0039 sq mi (0.01 km^{2})
- Elevation: 620 ft (190 m)

Population (2020)
  - Total: 1,256
  - Density: 784.0/sq mi (302.72/km^{2})
- Time zone: UTC-5:00 (Eastern (EST))
  - Summer (DST): UTC-4:00 (EDT)
- ZIP code: 47448
- Area code: 812
- FIPS code: 18-52038
- GNIS feature ID: 2396797
- Website: https://www.townofnashville.org/

Nashville is a town in Washington Township, Brown County, Indiana, United States. The population was 1,256 at the 2020 census. The town is the county seat of Brown County and is the county's only incorporated town. The town is best known as the center of the Brown County Art Colony and as a tourist destination.

== History ==
Settlement of land in and around Nashville began with the acquisition of land from native populations under the 1809 Treaty of Fort Wayne. This was expanded with more acquisitions under the 1818 Treaty of St. Mary's. Founded in 1836 by county agent Banner C. Brummett, it was first named Jacksonburg. The population of the entire county was estimated to be 150 in 1830. The first Nashville courthouse was constructed in 1837 and a jail was added in the same year. By 1840, area population had grown to 2,364. The town was officially incorporated in 1872. By the turn of the century, heavy logging in the area had caused significant deforestation which resulted in dramatic erosion problems.

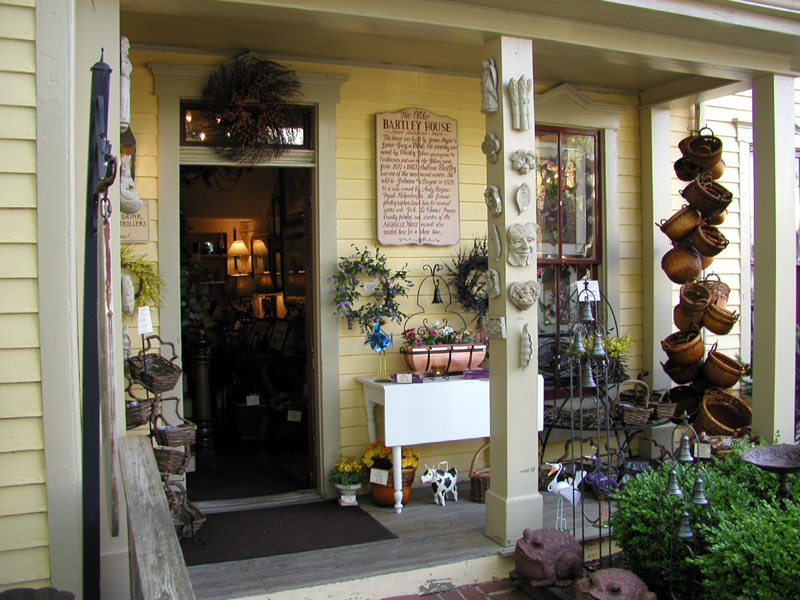
Entrance to a shop in the Bartley House

In the early twentieth century, a number of artists settled in the area, most notably T. C. Steele, the American Impressionist painter. These artists were the basis for the Brown County Art Colony, which continues to this day as the Brown County Art Guild.

The Brown County Courthouse Historic District and F.P. Taggart Store are listed on the National Register of Historic Places.

== Geography ==
According to the 2010 census, Nashville has a total area of 1.01 square miles (2.62 km^{2}), all land.

Nashville's rolling hills, ridges, and valleys are a story of the north fork of Salt Creek. The surrounding hills are made of sandstone, siltstone and shale. These sedimentary rocks were laid down in an ancient river delta named the Borden delta, similar to the current Mississippi River delta. Salt Creek (south), Greasy Creek (east), and Jackson Branch Creek (west) have cut down through the surrounding terrain to give Nashville its rolling hills. Lake Monroe, the largest lake in Indiana, was constructed by damming Salt Creek south of Bloomington.

=== Climate ===
The climate in this area is characterized by hot, humid summers and generally mild to cool winters. According to the Köppen Climate Classification system, Nashville has a humid subtropical climate, abbreviated "Cfa" on climate maps.

== Demographics ==
Historical population
Census	Pop.	Note	%±
1870	270		—
1880	348		28.9%
1890	395		13.5%
1900	393		−0.5%
1910	354		−9.9%
1920	323		−8.8%
1930	369		14.2%
1940	493		33.6%
1950	526		6.7%
1960	489		−7.0%
1970	527		7.8%
1980	705		33.8%
1990	873		23.8%
2000	825		−5.5%
2010	803		−2.7%
2020	1,256		56.4%
U.S. Decennial Census

=== 2020 census ===
As of the 2020 census, Nashville had a population of 1,256. The median age was 61.4 years. 12.3% of residents were under the age of 18 and 43.3% of residents were 65 years of age or older. For every 100 females there were 74.2 males, and for every 100 females age 18 and over there were 69.5 males age 18 and over.

0.0% of residents lived in urban areas, while 100.0% lived in rural areas.

There were 665 households in Nashville, of which 16.2% had children under the age of 18 living in them. Of all households, 33.2% were married-couple households, 16.7% were households with a male householder and no spouse or partner present, and 45.4% were households with a female householder and no spouse or partner present. About 50.5% of all households were made up of individuals and 35.2% had someone living alone who was 65 years of age or older.

There were 733 housing units, of which 9.3% were vacant. The homeowner vacancy rate was 1.7% and the rental vacancy rate was 0.9%.

Racial composition as of the 2020 census
Race	Number	Percent
White	1,170	93.2%
Black or African American	12	1.0%
American Indian and Alaska Native	2	0.2%
Asian	6	0.5%
Native Hawaiian and Other Pacific Islander	0	0.0%
Some other race	10	0.8%
Two or more races	56	4.5%
Hispanic or Latino (of any race)	27	2.1%

=== 2010 census ===
As of the census of 2010, there were 803 people, 359 households, and 167 families living in the town. The population density was 795.0 inhabitants per square mile (307.0/km^{2}). There were 412 housing units at an average density of 407.9 per square mile (157.5/km^{2}). The racial makeup of the town was 98.1% White, 0.4% African American, 0.2% Native American, 0.1% Asian, 0.6% from other races, and 0.5% from two or more races. Hispanic or Latino of any race were 0.7% of the population.

There were 359 households, of which 15.9% had children under the age of 18 living with them, 37.3% were married couples living together, 7.0% had a female householder with no husband present, 2.2% had a male householder with no wife present, and 53.5% were non-families. 48.5% of all households were made up of individuals, and 29% had someone living alone who was 65 years of age or older. The average household size was 1.90 and the average family size was 2.79.

The median age in the town was 59.7 years. 14.7% of residents were under the age of 18; 4.5% were between the ages of 18 and 24; 11.8% were from 25 to 44; 29.3% were from 45 to 64; and 40% were 65 years of age or older. The gender makeup of the town was 41.0% male and 59.0% female.

=== 2000 census ===
As of the census of 2000, there were 825 people, 375 households, and 181 families living in the town. The population density was 868.6 inhabitants per square mile (335.4/km^{2}). There were 412 housing units at an average density of 433.8 per square mile (167.5/km^{2}). The racial makeup of the town was 97.09% White, 0.85% African American, 0.85% Native American, 0.36% Asian, 0.12% Pacific Islander, 0.36% from other races, and 0.36% from two or more races. Hispanic or Latino of any race were 0.61% of the population.

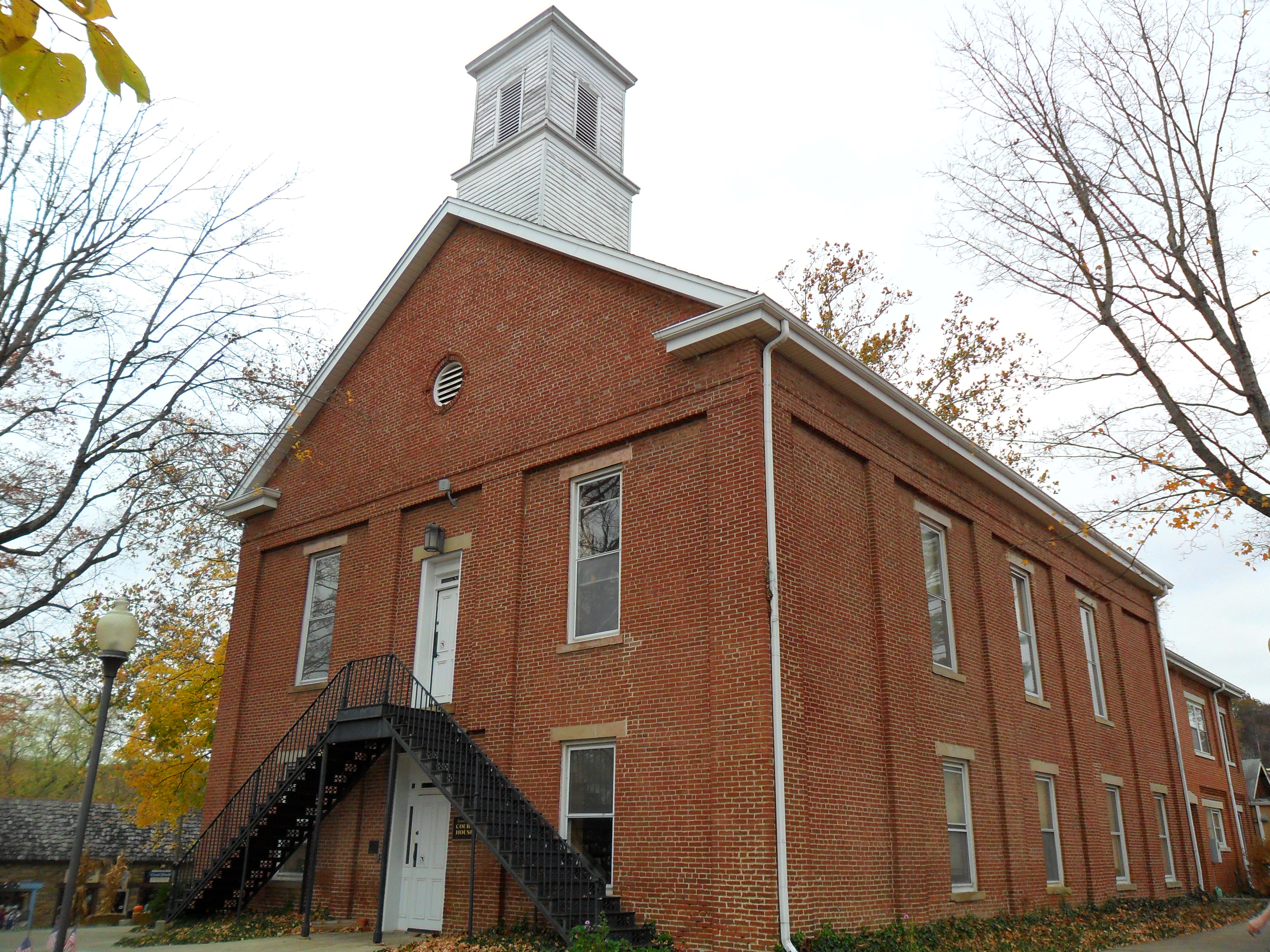
Nashville courthouse

There were 375 households, out of which 16.8% had children under the age of 18 living with them, 37.3% were married couples living together, 9.3% had a female householder with no husband present, and 51.5% were non-families. 45.3% of all households were made up of individuals, and 20.5% had someone living alone who was 65 years of age or older. The average household size was 1.86 and the average family size was 2.58.

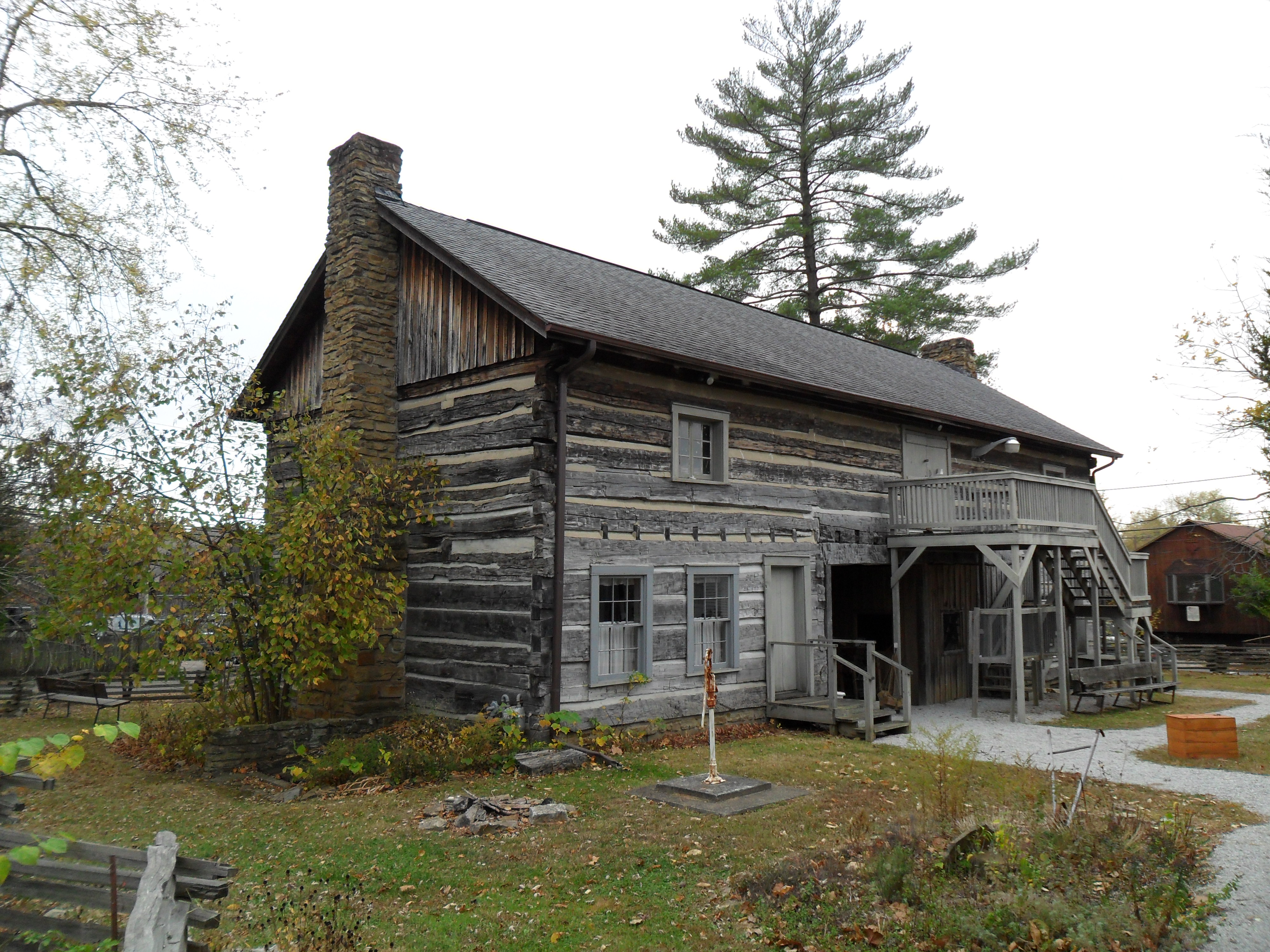
Previous Nashville jail, now a museum

In the town, the population was spread out, with 13.0% under the age of 18, 8.4% from 18 to 24, 20.8% from 25 to 44, 25.9% from 45 to 64, and 31.9% who were 65 years of age or older. The median age was 52 years. For every 100 females, there were 77.0 males. For every 100 females age 18 and over, there were 73.4 males.

The median income for a household in the town was $27,330, and the median income for a family was $38,750. Males had a median income of $30,000 versus $25,000 for females. The per capita income for the town was $24,723. About 14.3% of families and 16.5% of the population were below the poverty line, including 23.9% of those under age 18 and 18.9% of those age 65 or over.

== Education ==
The Town of Nashville is home to the central campus of the Brown County School District, the only school corporation in Brown County. The schools include Brown County Middle School serving grades 6–8, and Brown County High School which serves grades 9–12. The Brown County School Corporation Administration Office, affectionately referred to as the "White House" is located in Nashville as well. Nashville has a public library, a branch of the Brown County Public Library.

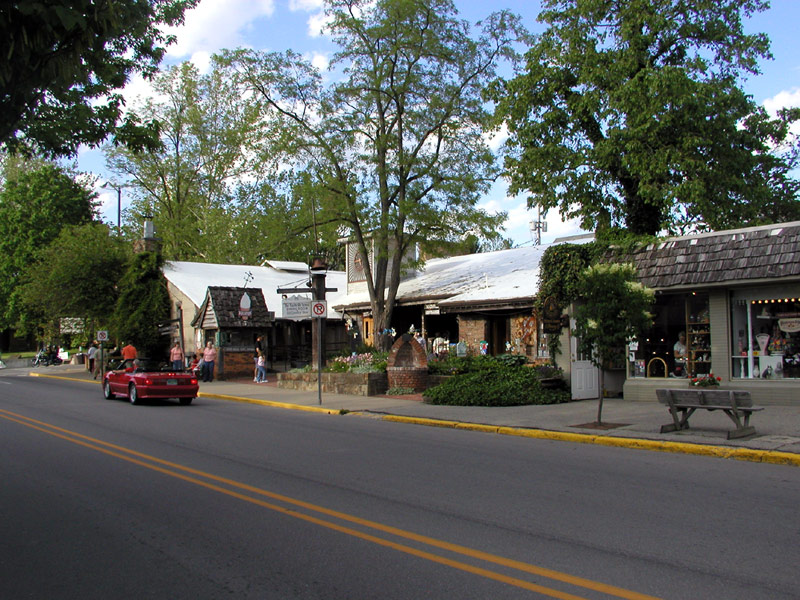
Van Buren St. in Nashville, Indiana showing some shops and the historic Nashville House

== Arts and culture ==
Nashville's tourist industry is based upon the original works of resident artists and the area's scenic environment. For example, the Brown County State Park is located just outside the town. Art, antique, and specialty shops, as well as galleries, restaurants, and entertainment venues, make up downtown Nashville, and many inns, rented cottages, and bed and breakfast establishments serve visitors. Tasting tours of wineries and distilleries also occur.

Nashville was the original home of the John Dillinger Museum, which was relocated to Hammond after the original owner's death.
