= Ethel Black =

Ethel Black may refer to:

- Ethel McMillan (1904–1987), New Zealand politician
- Ethel Black Kealing (1877–1960), American writer
- Ethel Cuff Black (1890–1977), American educator
