= Janet Payne Bowles =

American metal artist (1873–1948)

- Born: Janet Payne; June 29, 1872 or 1873; Indianapolis, Indiana, United States
- Died: July 18, 1948; Indianapolis, Indiana
- Resting place: Crown Hill Cemetery and Arboretum, Indianapolis, Indiana U.S. 39.8233022°N 86.179555°W
- Known for: metalworking and jewelry
- Movement: Arts and Crafts movement
- Spouse: Joseph Moore Bowles (1866–1934)
- Awards: Spencer Trask Award, National Society of Craftsmen (ca. 1909)
- Patrons: Caspar Purdon Clarke; J. P. Morgan

Janet Payne Bowles (June 29, 1872 or 1873 – July 18, 1948) was an American art educator, metalsmith, and jewelry designer from Indianapolis, Indiana, who is best known for creating intricate Arts-and-Crafts-style jewelry, flatware, and other small objects. Although the self-taught artisan had little commercial success during her lifetime, she became famous after designing a jewelry collection for actress Maude Adams to wear in a stage production of As You Like It. Sir Caspar Purdon Clarke and J. P. Morgan commissioned Payne Bowles to make several pieces of metalwork and jewelry for their collections. She also regularly exhibited her art in the United States and Europe and taught art classes at Shortridge High School in Indianapolis from 1912 until her retirement in 1942. Examples of Payne Bowles's work are included in the collections of the Indianapolis Museum of Art. She also wrote book reviews for Modern Art in the early years of her career and contributed articles to The Craftsman in 1904, Handicraft in 1909 and in 1910, and Jewelers' Circular Weekly in 1911. In addition, Payne Bowles provided illumination paintings for limited-edition books such as The Second Epistle of John (1901). Her novel, Gossamer to Steel, was published in 1917.

== Early life and education ==
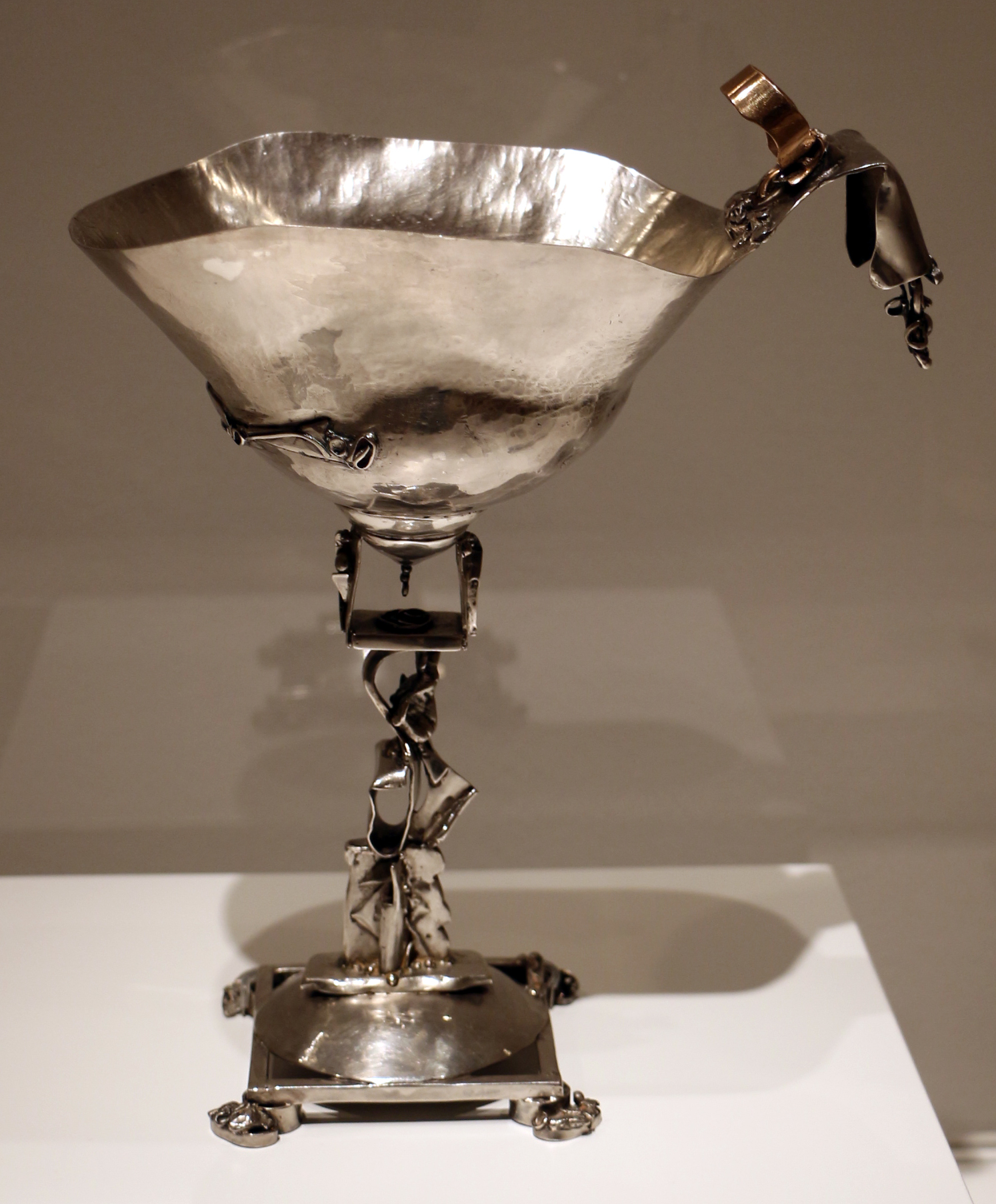
Goblet, 1907-28 ca.

Janet Payne, the daughter of John Godman Payne (c. 1847 – c. 1889) and Mary Byfield (born c. 1846), was born in Indianapolis, Indiana, on June 29, 1872 or 1873. Janet trained as a pianist for much of her youth, studying under Clarence Forsyth, the founder of the Indianapolis School of Music. As a student at Indianapolis High School (later renamed Shortridge High School), she studied art under Roda E. Selleck, who was influential in the Arts and Crafts movement in the Indianapolis area. After graduating from Indianapolis High School in 1890, Payne became active in the city's art community but had no further formal art training. In 1895, she joined the Portfolio Club, which was an association of area artists, writers, architects, teachers, and musicians who gathered regularly for exhibitions, lectures, and social events.

== Marriage and family ==
On October 22, 1895, Payne married Joseph Moore Bowles (1866–1934). The couple moved to Boston, Massachusetts, soon after their wedding. Joseph Bowles was an Arts and Crafts movement artist in the Indianapolis area who helped to found the Portfolio Club in 1890. He also established Modern Art, a quarterly art journal in Indianapolis in 1893. The publication was later described as "one of the most influential art journals to spread the Arts and Crafts message." Bowles sold his interest in the publication after moving to Boston, but remained as its editor until the last issue was published in 1897.

In their early years together, Janet and Joseph Bowles moved several times, including a move in 1902 to Rye, New York, where Joseph managed the art department at McClure's Magazine. The first of the couple's two children, a daughter, Mira, was born on July 8, 1902. A son, Jan, was born on November 2, 1904. In November 1906, the Bowles family moved to Helicon Hall, part of novelist Upton Sinclair's experimental community on the outskirts of Englewood, New Jersey. After the building where they were living burned in March 1907, the family relocated to New York City.

Payne Bowles separated from her husband in 1912, but they were never legally divorced. She moved with her children to her hometown of Indianapolis, Indiana, in the spring of 1912 and found work as an art teacher at her alma mater, which by that time had been renamed Shortridge High School.

== Career ==
=== Early years ===
After Payne Bowles's piano was ruined in a housemoving accident during a move to Boston in 1895, she decided to give up a potential career in music to pursue other interests. Payne Bowles began her literary and artistic career by writing book reviews for Modern Art, the quarterly magazine her husband edited, and providing illumination paintings for limited-edition books that he published. The Second Epistle of John (1901) "is her earliest surviving work." Payne Bowles found this type of work unfulfilling and began to attended seminars in psychology and philosophy at Radcliffe College in Cambridge, Massachusetts.

=== Metalsmith and jeweler ===
While exploring Boston in the late 1890s, Payne Bowles was drawn to the sound of a ringing anvil. She later said, "It was such a beautiful tone that it attracted me irresistibly." Payne Bowles sought out the source of the sound and met a young Russian metalsmith who agreed to let her help him in his shop. He was soon arrested and jailed for a plot to overthrow the U.S. government, but Payne Bowles's training in his shop led to her decision to become a metalsmith and jeweler. She regularly visited the anarchist in prison and he encouraged her to use his now abandoned equipment to set up a metalwork studio in her home. While continuing to write, Payne Bowles also began to study metalworking more intentionally. She apprenticed as a metalworker, a jeweler, and a stonecutter, as well as studying the work of various artisans, but had no additional formal art training.

After Payne Bowles and her family settled in New York City in 1907, she established a small metalworking shop to make jewelry and other objects. She also studied the ancient metalwork used in objects at the Metropolitan Museum of Art and learned from the Japanese metalsmiths who cleaned and worked with the collection. While continuing to experiment with metalwork and jewelry making at her studio, Payne Bowles also attended lectures in psychology at Columbia University.

In 1909, Payne Bowles earned a commission from painter and theatrical designer John Alexander to design a jewelry collection for Maude Adams to wear on stage for her role as "Rosalind" in William Shakespeare's As You Like It. The work increased awareness of Payne Bowles's work and launched her career as a metalsmith and jewelry designer. As her reputation grew, she began to accept commissions from notable people in the city. After a chance meeting with Sir Caspar Purdon Clarke, director of the Metropolitan Museum of Art from 1905 to 1910, he commissioned several pieces of her metalwork. Introductions from Clark led her to work for financier J. Pierpont Morgan, who was impressed with Payne Bowles's creations. She later claimed to have spent all of her time from 1909 until Morgan's death in 1913 fashioning numerous commissioned pieces for his flatware and jewelry collection from the gold and jewels that he provided.

=== Art educator ===
After separating from her husband and returning to Indianapolis with her two children in 1912, Payne Bowles took a position teaching craftwork courses at her alma mater, now called Shortridge High School. She taught alongside Roda Selleck, her former teacher, until Sellick's retirement in 1924, as well as with artist and educator, Arthur Wesley Dow. In addition to her metalwork and jewelry courses at Shortridge, Payne Bowles introduced a pre-dental course. Beginning in 1929 she also taught pottery. Payne Bowels continued to teach art at Shortridge until her retirement in June 1942.

Payne Bowles believed in "learning by doing" and championed a spontaneous, rhythmic approach to art that "stressed balance, proportion, rhythm, and function." Her metalworking program at Shortridge became a popular one. Enrollment in metalworking classes tripled within a year of her arrival. Payne Bowles's students regularly won competitions and learned skills not usually studied by students so young. She also sent some of her advanced students' work to New York City for exhibition at R. L. Gorham's gallery, where it appeared with contributions from students attending Pratt Institute, Columbia University, Cooper Union, Rhode Island School of Design, and the Art Institute of Chicago.

=== Writer ===
In addition to writing book reviews for Modern Art in the early years of her career, Payne Bowles wrote articles for Gustav Stickley's Arts and Crafts journal, The Craftsman, in 1904. Other articles by Payne Bowles were published in Handicraft in 1909 and 1910, and in Jewelers' Circular Weekly in 1911.

In 1907, a fire in the Bowles's New Jersey apartment building destroyed a manuscript that Payne Bowles had worked on for seven years and had been accepted by a publisher. After reconstructing a new version from her notes, Payne Bowles's novel, Gossamer to Steel, was published in 1917.

=== Other activities ===
Payne Bowles regularly exhibited her work in the United States and in Europe. Venues included the second exhibition of the Society of Arts and Crafts in 1899 and the annual exhibition of the National Society of Craftsmen in New York City in 1909 and in 1910. Following her return to Indianapolis in 1912, she exhibited her art at annual exhibitions of the John Herron Art Institute (later renamed the Indianapolis Museum of Art), at the Panama–Pacific International Exposition in San Francisco in 1915, and at the Art Institute of Chicago and the Indiana State Fair. She also had several solo shows at the Genthe Studio in New York (1921), Shortridge High School (1924 and 1934), and the Art Center in New York City (1924 and 1929–30). ArtNews described Payne Bowles in 1925 as "one of the most creative designers working in America" at that time. She opposed to art that is too imitative or structure-based, preferring instead to make free-form pieces in the Arts-and-Crafts-style that were well-proportioned, harmonious, and balanced.

In the 1920s, Payne Bowles entered a gold chalice in an art competition sponsored by Italian art patron J. Bossilini and won first place. Her notoriety from winning the competition led to commissions several Catholic churches in Italy. In addition, Payne Bowles visited Paris, France, in 1925 as a delegate to the International Exhibit of Decorative Arts. She also took classes at the Sorbonne and worked with metalsmiths at the University of Geneva in Switzerland. Other trips included visits to Russia and South America.

== Later years ==
In her later years in Indianapolis, Payne Bowles served as vice president of the Portfolio Club, which she joined in 1894, and was a member of the city's Woman's Poetry Club and Woman's Rotary Club. She also formed the Art Appreciation Club in 1920 and founded the Workmanship Guild in 1927 at Shortridge High School before retiring from teaching in June 1942 due to ill health.

== Death and legacy ==
Payne Bowles died on July 18, 1948, in Indianapolis, Indiana. She was active contributor to the art community in Indianapolis through her own metalwork and jewelry creations, as well as her three decades of teaching art courses at Shortridge High School. Although Payne Bowles had little commercial success, she continued to create, exhibit, and sell her work and remained active in the Arts and Crafts movement in the United States.

Payne Bowles's unique metalwork and jewelry have been described as "bizarre but compelling," as well as "decidedly unconventional." She avoided preparatory sketches in her work, preferring to form the metalwork as she proceeded, and encouraged her art students to do the same. Art historians Judith Vale Newton and Carol Ann Weiss commented in their book, Skirting the Issue: Stories of Indiana's Historical Women Artists, that her free-form pieces also showed "a controlled engagement with her medium" Janet Zapata remarked in an American Crafts article published in 1994 that Payne Bowles's work showed "a command of proportion, harmony and balance."

In 1968 Payne Bowles's two children donated more than 120 pieces of her metalwork, which were part of Payne Bowles's estate, to the present-day Indianapolis Museum of Art. Payne Bowles's work was included in the exhibition, "Independent Spirit: Art by Indiana Women, 1890–1950" at the Indianapolis Museum of Art in 1991–92. In addition, a retrospective exhibition of her work, "The Arts and Crafts Metalwork of Jante Payne Bowles" was hosted at the Munson-Williams-Proctor Institute Museum of Art in Utica, New York, in 1993–94 and at the Indianapolis Museum of Art in 1994.

== Honors and tributes ==
- Awarded the Spencer Trask Award, circa 1909, from the National Society of Craftsmen.
