= Kealing =

Kealing is a surname. Notable people with the surname include:

- Ethel Black Kealing (1877–1960), American writer and arts patron
- H. T. Kealing (1859–1918), American writer, educator, and churchman

== See also ==
- Keating (surname)
