= Richard Wood (executive) =

Richard Wood was an American business executive.

== Early life and education ==
Born in Brazil, Indiana, Wood studied at Shortridge High School and DePauw University, before earning an engineering degree from Purdue University. Later, he also earned an MBA from the Wharton School.

Wood was married to Billie Lou Wood who died in 2013.

== Career ==
Wood began his career at Eli Lilly and Company in 1950. His tenure included positions in Argentina and Mexico before he became Vice President of Industrial Relations.

In 1972, Wood became the president and CEO of Eli Lilly and Co. Under his leadership, the company evolved from a producer of antibiotics and animal-derived insulin into the seventh largest pharmaceutical manufacturer in the U.S. by 1991.

During his presidency at Eli Lilly, he led the development of products such as Prozac and biosynthetic insulin. He continued his leadership role post-retirement, chairing the IMA board and contributing to its expansion.

Retiring in 1991, Wood became involved in philanthropic endeavors, supporting institutions such as the Indianapolis Museum of Art, the Children's Museum, and the Indianapolis Symphony Orchestra. He also led a campaign for the Full Circle Celebration marking the rejuvenation of Downtown.
