= Choice Edwards =

American politician (born 1942)

Choice Edwards (born January 20, 1942) was a state legislator in Indiana. A Republican, he represented Marion County, Indiana in the Indiana House of Representatives between 1969–1970. He was African-American.

He attended Shortridge High School. After resigning from the House of Representatives, he worked at Housing and Urban Development.
