= Esther Herrman =

American activist and philanthropist (1823 – 1911)

- Born: Esther Mendels; Utrecht, Kingdom of the Netherlands
- Died: July 4, 1911 (aged 87); New York City, New York, U.S.

Esther Herrman (August 7, 1823 – July 4, 1911) was a Dutch-born American activist for women's suffrage and the pursuit of higher education. She was most known for her philanthropic activities as one of the founders of Barnard College and being in Sorosis, an early women's club created to promote women's rights.

== Early life ==
Esther Mendels was born August 7, 1823 in Utrecht, the Netherlands. After the death of her mother, she came to the United States in 1827. She had three sisters: Adelaide, Gamma, and Jette. In 1843, she married Henry Herrman (1822–1889), who was an immigrant from Baden, Germany. The two spent their early years in New York City but decided to move to New Bedford, Massachusetts, in 1847, where they had their first two children, Sophia and Henrietta. When they relocated to Boston, they had their third child, Abraham. During this transition, Henry Herrman changed from being a sailing vessel supplier to managing a clothing business.

In 1852, they returned to New York City, where the couple had three more children: Caroline, Lillie, and Daniel Webster. With the success of her husband’s textile import company (H. Herrman, Sternbach & Co.), the family moved into a more affluent neighborhood in 1871. Before Henry Herrman died in 1889, he left his wife and children with considerable financial security.

Esther Herrman was Jewish.

== Legacy and contributions ==
Herrman became a member of Sorosis in 1876. The club was one of New York City’s pioneering women’s clubs, and by 1881, Herrman was one of the leading associates of its philanthropic committee. From this moment onwards, she entered the world of women's clubs and embarked on a 35-year journey of active participation and providing financial assistance to a wide range of patriotic, educational, and charitable organizations. Sorosis allowed Herrman to connect with socially influential women all around, such as suffragist Lillie Deveraux Blake. She was exposed to more women’s rights movements and became a supporter whilst regularly attending various meetings and contributing to women’s suffrage organizations.

Her largest charitable contributions—each exceeding $10,000—benefited five major local institutions. Her donation to Barnard College in the early 1890s was one of her earliest and most notable donations. This led to Herrman becoming one of the founders of the college, and for the institution to become the first secular college in the city to grant women B.A. degrees. Laura Levy Jackson, Herrman’s granddaughter, graduated with Barnard’s first class in 1893.

Herrman also endowed an educational fund for the Young Men’s Hebrew Association in 1897. She mentioned that her motivation came from the positive experience one of her sons had at the Young Men’s Christian Association years before. It pushed her to support similar opportunities, specifically for Jewish youth. In this process, she became a major donor to the Hebrew Technical Institute, a vocational school for teenage boys, in 1897. They gave her the title of honorary vice president after making the school’s first major donation. She also supported the New York Botanical Garden in 1896 by donating a herbarium before later funding a program that allowed teachers to study botany directly from nature. The New York Academy of Sciences received a gift from Herrman as well (1901), to create a new building that but it was ultimately used for aiding scientific research instead.

During her Honorary Dinner in 1902, Herrman spoke about Noblesse Oblige: "At the bottom of religion and at the top of good breeding was the same principle, that those who have must share with those who have not. Nobility brings obligation. The true theory of life is that fortune, or ability of any sort, carries with it a duty, and the duty is measured by the amount of the fortune or the ability."

Herrman pursued her philanthropic work until her death on July 4, 1911, at her home in New York City.
