= Sharon E. Watkins =

American pastor (born 1954)

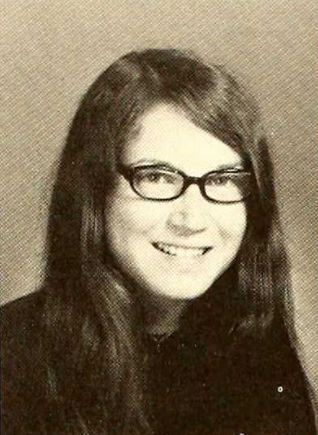
Sharon E. Watkins, 1972

Sharon E. Watkins (born 1954) is an ordained Christian minister who became the first woman to lead a mainline denomination in North America in 2005, when she was elected the general minister and president of the Christian Church (Disciples of Christ) in the United States and Canada. She served two 6-year terms. She preached at the national prayer service on January 21, 2009, at the invitation of President Barack Obama, becoming the first woman to preach at an inaugural prayer service. In 2017, after stepping down from the role of general minister and president of the Christian Church (Disciples of Christ), she became director of the Truth and Racial Justice Initiative of the National Council of Churches of Christ, USA. She later served as the pastor of Bethany Memorial Church, in Bethany, West Virginia, until retirement.

== Education ==
Watkins grew up in Indianapolis, Indiana, where she attended Shortridge High School. She studied at Macalester College in Minnesota, from 1972 to 1974, before transferring to Butler University, where she completed a Bachelor of Arts degree in French and economics. She made the decision to serve as a missionary through the mission board of her denomination, the Christian Church (Disciples of Christ), and served for two years in the Congo, then known as Zaire, leading literacy programs. Upon returning to the United States, she worked in the Africa Department of the Division for Overseas Ministry, for the Christian Church (Disciples of Christ). Feeling called to the ministry, she then enrolled in the Master of Divinity program at Yale Divinity School, graduating in 1984. She was ordained that same year, at Spring Glen Church in Hamden, Connecticut, where she served as a part-time assistant minister, while completing her studies.

== Ministry ==
In her early years of ministry, Watkins served in a variety of professional settings. After leaving seminary, she pastored at Boone Grove Christian Church in Boone Grove, Indiana, for four years. She then worked in educational settings, including three years as the director of student services at Phillips Theological Seminary in Tulsa, Oklahoma. While working there, she completed a doctorate in theology, graduating in 1996. From 1997 to 2005, she served as the senior minister of Disciples Christian Church in Bartlesville, Oklahoma.

In addition, Watkins took on a variety of leadership roles at the national level in the Christian Church (Disciples of Christ), prior to being elected general minister and president. She served as a member of the Disciples' general board, and the General Board Task Force on Reconciliation Mission. She also participated in the annual Stone-Campbell Dialogues, begun in 1999, which bring together three diverse strands of the Restoration movement, known as the Stone-Campbell movement, named after early church leaders Alexander and Thomas Campbell and Barton Warren Stone. In 2000, she presented a paper entitled, "Women and Leadership in the Christian Church (Disciples of Christ)," which was later published.

In 2005, at the denomination's General Assembly in Portland, Oregon, Watkins was elected as general minister and president of the Christian Church (Disciples of Christ) in the United States and Canada. She was the first woman to be elected to lead a mainline denomination in North America.

Watkins delivered the sermon at the National Prayer Service in Washington, D.C., on January 21, 2009, at the invitation of newly inaugurated president, Barack Obama. She became the first woman to preach at an inaugural prayer service. She also offered the call to worship at the president's second National Prayer Service in 2013. She served a term on the White House Advisory Council for the Office of Faith-Based and Neighborhood Partnerships.

In 2017, she began a new role with the National Council of Church USA, as the director of the Council's Truth and Racial Justice Initiative. Prior to serving as director of this initiative, she served as chair of the governing board for the National Council of Churches. Watkins' ecumenical work also includes serving on the Central Committee for the World Council of Churches. She has also served on the board of Sojourners, a non-profit organization for social justice based in Washington, D.C.

In early 2020, she became the pastor of Bethany Memorial Church in Bethany, West Virginia. The church was established by Alexander Campbell in 1831.

She is married with two children.

== Works ==
Watkins is the author of one book, Whole: A Call to Unity in Our Fragmented World, published by Chalice Press.
