= Wilhelmina Luten =

American statistician

- Luten, from the 1927 yearbook of Smith College
- Born: September 30, 1906; Indiana, U.S.
- Died: October 1986 (aged 80); Virginia, U.S.
- Other names: Wilhelmina Luten Seccombe, Wilhelmina Luten Riley
- Occupations: Statistician, economic researcher

Wilhelmina Luten Seccombe Riley (September 30, 1906 – October 1986) was an American statistician associated with federal government programs including the Works Progress Administration, the Economic Cooperation Administration, the Mutual Security Agency, and the Agency for International Development (USAID).

== Early life and education ==
Luten was born in Indiana, the daughter of Daniel Benjamin Luten and Edith Heath Hull Luten. Her father was a math and engineering instructor at the University of Michigan and Purdue University. She graduated from Shortridge High School in 1923, and from Smith College in 1927, with graduate studies at Simmons College.

== Career ==
Luten was a summer camp counselor after college, and a fellow in the research department of the Women's Educational and Industrial Union in Boston. In 1932 she was statistician for the Detroit Department of Public Welfare. In 1934 she was named supervisor of the Federal Emergency Relief Administration's field office in Louisiana. She prepared reports on employment for the Works Progress Administration in the 1930s. She was an analytical statistician at the Economic Cooperation Administration in the 1940s, and for the Mutual Security Agency and the Agency for International Development (USAID).

== Publications ==
- "Unemployment as a cause of family dependency" (1929)
- "A Survey of 1200 Families, Detroit Department of Public Welfare" (1932)
- An analysis of employment of women on Works Progress Administration projects, December 1935 through May 1936 (1936, WPA report)

== Personal life ==
Luten married twice. She married William T. Seccombe in 1949; he died in 1961. Her second husband was fellow statistician Donald C. Riley; he died in 1973. She died in 1986, at the age of 80, at a hospital in northern Virginia.
