= Sarah D. Allen Oren Haynes =

American librarian, mathematician, and botanist

Sarah D. Allen Oren Haynes (March 2, 1836 – April 20, 1907) was an American librarian, mathematician, and botanist. She was the first woman to become state librarian of Indiana, and the first woman on the faculty of Purdue University.

== Early life, education, and first marriage ==
Sarah D. Allen was born on March 2, 1836, to a family of Quakers in Clinton County, Ohio, near Wilmington, Ohio. She became a schoolteacher at age 16, and a student at Antioch College. On December 31, 1856, she married Charles Oren, a childhood friend who had also become a student at Antioch. They bought a farm near Martinsville, Ohio, and had three children. Her husband became an infantry captain in the American Civil War in 1863, and was killed in July 1864 during the Siege of Petersburg. She lived on the farm for two more years, one of her children dying in that time, and then returned to her parents' home, where both her parents died in 1867.

== Academic career ==
At this time, she returned to teaching, at Antioch for a year, at an academy in Indianapolis in 1868, and then at Shortridge High School in Indianapolis until 1873, when the Indiana State legislature chose her as the Indiana State Librarian, the first woman to hold that position. By 1875, the political composition of the legislature had changed and her position as librarian was not renewed. She moved to Purdue University, initially as "female teacher of the university", then as an assistant professor of mathematics before being named professor of botany. This was also the first year in which Purdue admitted women. At Purdue, she lived on campus with her daughter Cata, planned a university orchard, set student behavioral standards, and headed a literary society.

== Second marriage and later life ==
In 1879 she married Wesley Haynes, a farmer, civil war veteran, and widowed father of two young children, whom she had known as a child. In preparing to do so, she gave up her faculty position in 1878. He died in 1897, and she moved to Sault Ste. Marie, Michigan, with Cata, who had settled there after marrying. There she undertook volunteer work for a local Baptist church, including fundraising for an ambulance. She died on April 20, 1907.
