= Miguel Condé =

Spanish painter

- Born: May 31, 1939 (age 87); Pittsburgh, United States
- Education: Atelier 17 with Stanley William Hayter
- Known for: Painting, printmaking, drawing, book art
- Movement: Figurative expressionism
- Awards: MacDowell Fellowship (1966); Guggenheim Fellowship (1974)

Miguel Condé (born 1939) is a Mexican figurative painter, draughtsman, and print maker. According to Radio France, he is "one of the most important contemporary masters in the field of engraving." Condé's works are in important museum collections all over the world; he is exhibiting regularly at both public and private venues, and he has received numerous international honors and awards.

== Early life ==
Miguel Condé was born in Pittsburgh, to Salvador Condé Álvarez, a Mexican painter, and Victoria Weiner, an American poet. He grew up in his father's house in Mexico. Although the house was not a traditional artist's atelier, it was a place where Salvador drew and painted and which Miguel found to be "a very attractive place because all the walls were painted a strange shade of green, and it was full of stuff like papier-mâché skeletons. It was a magic place where you could make up all sorts of stories." Young Condé split his time between Mexico and the United States until 1948 when he moved to New York with his mother. He attended P.S. 6 and Walden School, both in Manhattan, and graduated in 1956.

== Career ==
[My paintings are] a narrative which could be carried out on stage as well as on canvas, perhaps even on film. Of course, the ultimate narrative is our lives as we lead them.

–Miguel Condé

In 1956, at age 17, Condé rented a studio in New York and began to study anatomy with renowned American artist and anatomist Stephen Rogers Peck, author of the classic manual Atlas for Human Anatomy for the Artist. He also attended courses taught by the Harvard Art History professor and curator Millard Meiss, at the Fogg Art Museum. Condé returned to Mexico in 1959 and settled in Tepoztlán, a popular tourist destination near Mexico City. In 1963 he was awarded a scholarship by the French government (Bourse d’Etudes Libres), so he moved to Paris where he studied with Stanley William Hayter in his Atelier 17.

In 1966, Condé returned to the United States and soon afterwards accepted a teaching position in drawing and mixed media in the graduate program at the University of Iowa School of Art. In Iowa City he met and befriended an Argentinian-born American artist and printmaker Mauricio Lasansky and the influential Chilean author José Donoso. Condé became a MacDowell Fellow in 1966 and concentrated full-time on his work in visual arts. In 1968, his solo exhibition opened to critical acclaim at the prestigious Galería de Arte Mexicano in Mexico City. Later that year, William Liebrerman, curator of MoMA, acquired two of his drawings for the permanent collection of the New York Museum of Modern Art.

In 1969, he traveled to France and then moved with his family to Sitges, Catalonia, Spain.

In 1971, Condé worked at the Smithsonian Institution Print Workshop in Barcelona, which reignited his interest in graphic art. It was then that he met the prominent Spanish art dealer and print publisher Juana Mordó who offered him his first exhibition in Spain, which occurred in 1974. He became a foreign Artist-in-residence at the Cleveland Institute of Art in Ohio, in 1972. An exhibition at the Cleveland Museum of Art took place the following year.

In 1974, Condé was awarded the Guggenheim Fellowship by the Guggenheim Memorial Foundation. In 1976, Miguel Condé: paintings and drawings exhibition was organized by the Scottish Arts Council and took place in Edinburgh, Scotland. In 1977, Condé participated in Documenta 6 in Kassel, Germany. In 1978, an exhibition Miguel Condé: Guggenheim Suite took place at the Biblioteca Nacional de España in Madrid. In 1980, he was invited and took part in Peintres-Graveurs Français exhibition at the Bibliothèque nationale de France in Paris.

In 1983, the Ministry of Culture of Spain organized an extensive retrospective exhibition Miguel Condé: 20 años de obra grabada at the Sala Picasso of Biblioteca Nacional de España in Madrid. In a review of Condé's graphic work on display there, art critic and prolific author Fernando Huici opined that it was "paper—already forgotten in the absurd hierarchy of genres—in both drawing and engraving, where Condé finds most freedom, where he expresses with greater ease his particular vocabulary of images... " Another retrospective of the artist, Miguel Condé: Pinturas, Gouaches, Dibujos, opened at the Bilbao Fine Arts Museum later the same year.

In 1993, Condé met a Danish born, Madrid based printer and publisher Dan Benveniste, who would become his printer and, eventually, a collaborator in graphic projects. That same year, Ediciones Eegee-3 published 19 etchings printed by Dan Benveniste and presented them at the Fundación Carlos de Amberes in Madrid.

In 1998, a large scale installation Grandes Formatos opened at the Centro Cultural del Conde Duque in Madrid, Spain. The critically acclaimed exhibition was sponsored by the City council of Madrid and received a lot of media attention. Discussing his work with the art critic of the influential Spanish El País, Condé said, "My characters are fictional and come from fantasy, but they are not surreal. I always paint figuratively, and everyone has to interpret each work for himself... The treatment is different in painting versus drawing, denser and more susceptible to complex situations. Painting is dominated by gesture, by brushstroke and material, and I tend to concentrate on the character, without adding landscapes or architecture." In 1999, a collection of Condé's recent paintings went on exhibit at the Sales San Fernando in Seville, Spain. Both exhibitions were timed to celebrate the 25th anniversary of Condé's permanent move to Spain.

Numerous other exhibitions at both private and public venues followed, the more recent ones taking place in 2011, at the Museo del Grabado Español Contemporáneo in Marbella, Spain and the Goya Museum in Castres, France. Reviewing one such exhibition, J.M. Martí Font, Paris bureau chief for El Pais, quoted the prominent art scholar and author Maria Lluïsa Borràs, who wrote that Condé "revels in recovery for modernity subjects fitting of Cervantes or Quevedo, scenes and characters that evoke the aesthetics of the late Middle Ages even though they find themselves on the fringes of both time and history. In his compositions, increasingly more complex and meticulous, the absurd and the enigmatic gradually come together, Goya’s black irony, Bosch’s phantasmagorias, Brueghel’s repulsion and fluidity, and Dürer’s virtuoso drawing." A similar sentiment was expressed by art critic Fernando Huici who remarked in 1983 that "the world that inhabits Condé's creations, the world of his intimate fascinations, always maintains a Brueghelian flavor."

In 2012, Miguel Condé was featured in Michael Peppiatt's book Interviews with artists 1966 – 2012, published by the Yale University Press, along such post-war and contemporary masters as Francis Bacon, Balthus, Henry Moore, Diego Giacometti, Jean Dubuffet, Sean Scully, and Antoni Tàpies, to name a few.

== Personal life ==
Miguel Condé married Carola Schisel in Mexico, in 1960. They have two children: a son Amadeo, who was born in Paris in 1964, and a daughter, Caëtana María del Pilar, who was born in Iowa City in 1969. They split their time between Madrid and Sitges, Spain, where Condé works and maintains studios.

== Awards and honors ==
- MacDowell Fellow, 1966
- Special mention for painting, “May Show”, Cleveland Museum of Art, 1973
- Guggenheim Latin American Fellow, 1974
- First prize for printmaking, Landesbank, Stuttgart, 1981
- First prize “I/89 Euroamericana del Grabado”, Centro de Grabado Contemporáneo of A Coruña, Spain, 1989
- Lifetime member of the Société des Peintres-Graveurs Français, 1991
- Invited artist, “II Bienal Internacional de Gravado” of the Caixa de Ourense in Ourense, Spain, 1992
- Mapfre Foundation's Penagos Prize for drawing, 1999

== Selected museum collections ==
- Museum of Modern Art, New York, U.S.A.
- Art Institute of Chicago, Chicago, U.S.A.
- Smithsonian Institution, Washington, DC, U.S.A.
- Museo de Arte Contemporáneo, Madrid, Spain
- Brooklyn Museum, New York, U.S.A.
- Cleveland Museum of Art, Cleveland, U.S.A.
- Blanton Museum of Art, Austin, U.S.A.
- University of Iowa Museum of Art Iowa City, U.S.A.
- Essex Collection of Art from Latin America (ESCALA), University of Essex, Colchester, U.K.
- Museo Nacional Centro de Arte Reina Sofía, Madrid, Spain
- Albertina, Vienna, Austria
- Bibliothèque nationale de France, Paris, France
- Vatican Library, Vatican City

== Selected works ==
- Untitled (1971), Museum of Modern Art, New York.
- Plomo (1977), Brooklyn Museum.
- Messerschmitt (1973), Cleveland Museum of Art.
- Untitled (1972–1973), University of Iowa Museum of Art.
- Sin título, Colección MAPFRE, Madrid.
- Untitled (drinkers) (1993), Essex Collection of Art from Latin America (ESCALA), University of Essex.
- Sin título, Biblioteca Nacional de España.

== Bibliography ==
- Peppiatt, Michael. Interviews with Artists: 1966-2012. New Haven: Yale University Press, 2012 . ISBN 978-0300176629
- Borràs, Maria Lluïsa. Peppiatt, Michael. Miguel Condé: Pêle-mêle, 1972-2006 . Barcelona: Edifici Miramar, 2007. ISBN 978-8489948587
- Condé, Miguel. Detalles. Gijón: Sala de Arte Van Dyck, 2006.
- Obaldia, René de. Miguel Condé: Obra reciente. Gijón: Sala de Arte Van Dyck, 2003. ISBN 84-89948-58-5
- Barnatàn, Marcos-Ricardo. Croce-Spinelli, Michel. Lograño, Miguel. Miguel Condé: Grandes Formatos. Madrid: Ayuntamiento de Madrid, 1998. ISBN 978-8488006431
- Peppiatt, Michael. Miguel Condé. Seville: Caja San Fernando, 1999. Legal deposit M-2467-1999
- Condé, Miguel. Poésies de Sappho. Paris: Lacourière-Frélaut, 1986.
- Condé, Miguel. Miguel Condé: Obra Grafica. Madrid: Ministerio de Cultura, Direccion General de Bellas Artes y Archivos, 1984. ASIN: B008AEZJAE
- Condé, Miguel. Hänssel, Roland. Miguel Condé : Radierungen, 1963-1979. Stuttgart : Manus Presse, 1980.
- Condé, Miguel. Miguel Condé, paintings and drawings. Edinburgh: Scottish Arts Council, 1976. ISBN 978-0902989320
