= PS 6 =

Coordinates: 40°46′39.33″N 73°57′37.85″W

The Lillie Devereux Blake School (PS 6)
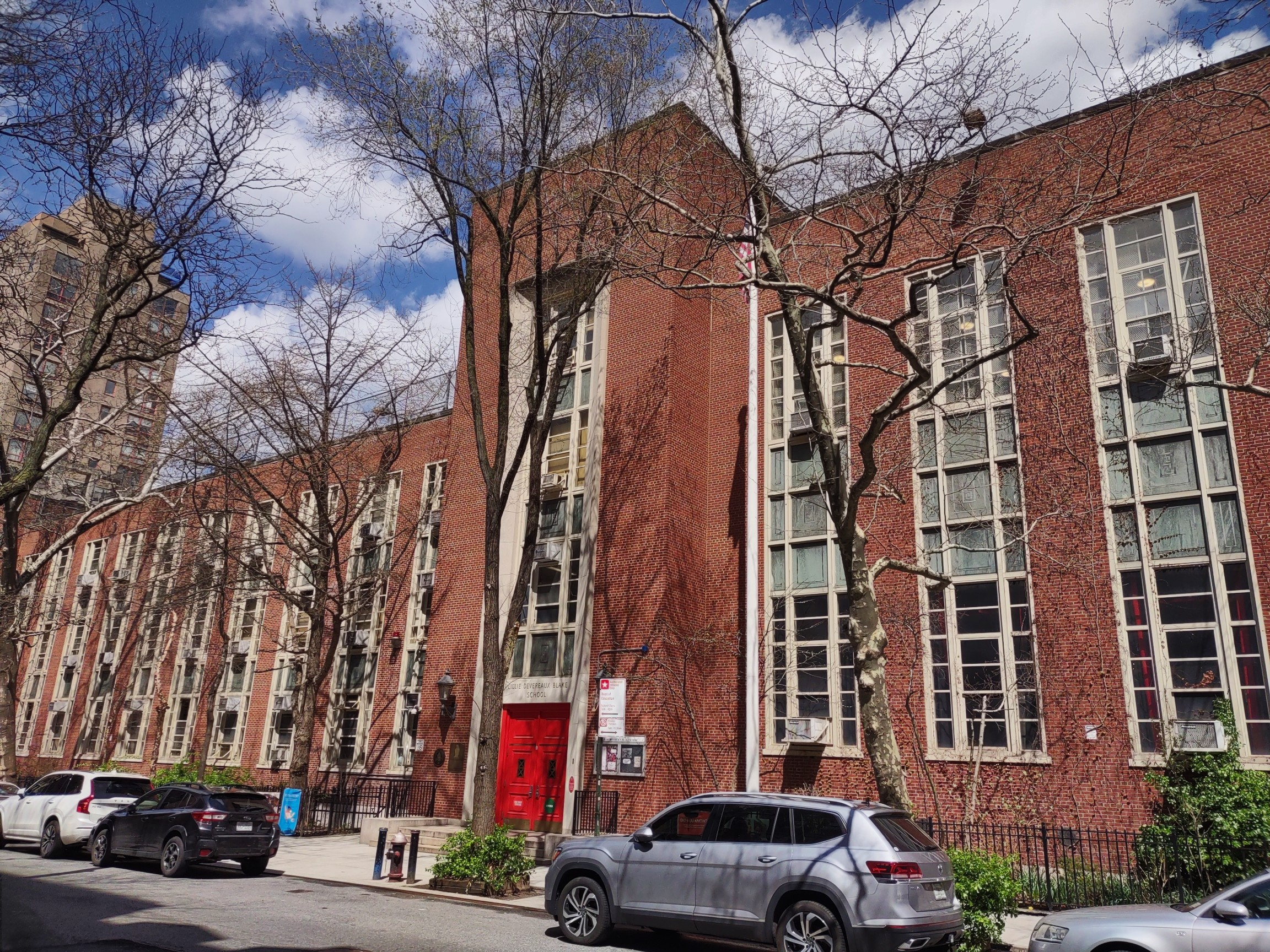
- Manhattan, New York City; United States

Information
- Type: Public
- Established: 1894
- Founder: Katherine Devereux Blake
- School district: 2
- Principal: Lauren Fontana
- Grades: K-5
- Mascot: Pale Male, the Redtailed Hawk
- Website: http://www.ps6nyc.com
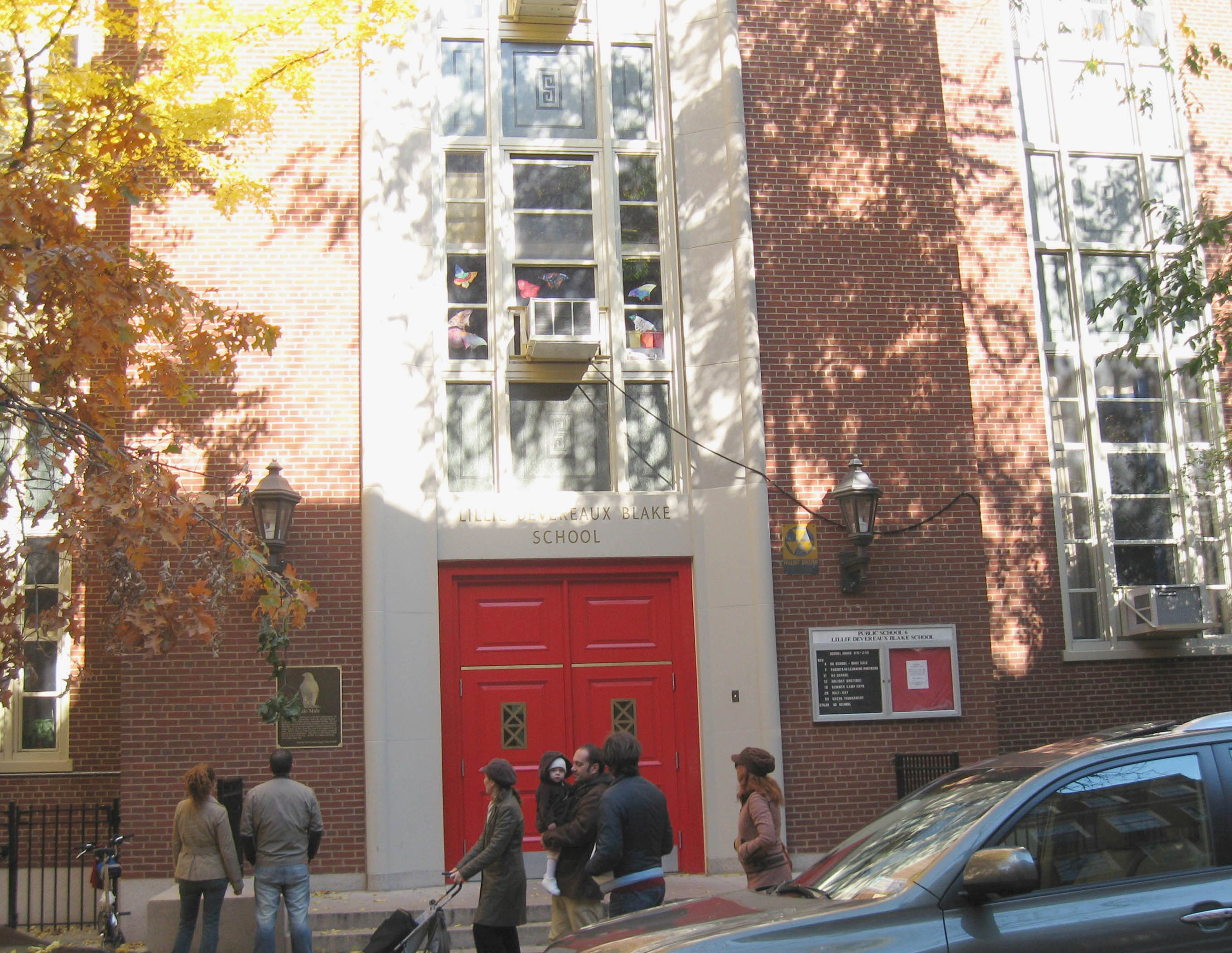

PS 6, The Lillie D. Blake School, is a public elementary school located on the Upper East Side of Manhattan, New York City. Founded in 1894, PS 6 is regarded as the top elementary school in New York City.

== Overview ==
PS 6 has about 800 students in grades K-5. Average class sizes are 23-28. The school is popular with families on the Upper East Side who often choose to send their children there rather than to private school. The school's former Principal, Carmen Fariña, claimed that the acceptance rate for out of district students was 1/7, lower than that of many top-tier Universities.

== History ==
PS 6 was founded in 1894 and named after the feminist author and reformer Lillie Devereux Blake (though the school has misspelled her name, with an added "a" in Devereux). The school was originally located several blocks to the north on 85th Street. The current red-brick building on Madison Avenue between 81st and 82nd Streets was constructed in 1953.

The school's first principal, Katherine Devereux Blake, the daughter of the school's namesake, served in that capacity for 34 years and demanded that the pacifist hymn I Didn't Raise My Boy to Be a Soldier be sung at every assembly.

== Academics ==
PS 6 is a Teacher's College "Mentor School." Students are expected to write plays, poetry, essays and short fiction by the time they graduate. The school also places a special emphasis on Art education. Its location, two blocks from the Metropolitan Museum of Art, allows the students particularly good access to view the works of famous artists. PS 6 was also the recipient of a grant from the Annenberg Foundation to help fund art projects in the school.

== Special events ==
Peter Yarrow played a special benefit concert in the school's auditorium for many years to raise money for the school.

== In popular culture ==
The school is featured in the 1979 film Kramer vs. Kramer, which won five Academy Awards.

== Notable alumni ==
- Richard Avedon, Photographer
- Phoebe Cates, Actress
- Chevy Chase, Actor
- Peter Cincotti, Jazz Singer/Songwriter
- Miguel Condé, Artist
- Damon Dash, Hip Hop Mogul
- Jose Feliciano, Guitarist
- William Hurt, Actor
- Robert Iler, Actor
- Jonathan Katz, Actor/Comedian
- Lenny Kravitz, Musician
- Michael Kurland, Author
- William Leroy, Reality TV Host
- Tina Louise Actress (Gilligan's Island)
- Lorna Luft, Actress, Singer, Daughter of Judy Garland
- Erin Moriarty, Actress
- Tony Roberts (actor), Actor
- J.D. Salinger, Author of The Catcher in the Rye
- Andrew Schulz, Comedian
- Herbert Solow (journalist), Writer, Editor of Fortune magazine
- Mark Sourian Film Producer
- Andrew Stein, Former President NYC Council, Former Manhattan Borough President
- Robert F. Wagner Jr., Mayor of New York and Ambassador to Spain
- David L. Wolper, Producer
- Peter Yarrow, Singer
- Alex Weiser, Composer
