= Katherine Devereux Blake =

American educator, peace activist, women's rights activist and writer

- Born: July 10, 1858; New York, New York
- Died: February 2, 1950 (aged 91)
- Education: Normal College, New York University
- Occupations: Educator, Activist

Katherine Devereux Umsted Blake (July 10, 1858 – February 2, 1950) was an American educator, peace activist, women's rights activist, and writer. She served for 34 years as the first principal of PS 6, a.k.a. The Lillie D. Blake School in New York City.

== Early years and education ==
Katherine Devereux Umsted Blake was born in New York City, on July 10, 1858. Her parents were Frank Geoffrey Quay Umsted and Lillie Devereux Blake. She was educated at Miss Walker's School, and Saint Mary's School. She graduated from the Normal College in 1876. She studied at the School of Pedagogy, New York University from 1887–88.

== Career ==
Blake served as Principal of Public School No. 6, in 1894. She organized the first evening high school for women in New York City, 1897. She served as Chair of the committee of teachers and principals that framed and presented to Mayor William Russell Grace the petition asking for the appointment of women on the Board of Education. She called together the committee of women teachers and principals who made the first effort to secure adequate salaries for city teachers. She spoke in reply to President Franklin D. Roosevelt when he addressed the National Educational Association. She compiled the first statistics showing the number of dark and badly lit rooms in public schools. She was a contributor of verse and prose to periodicals. Blake served as vice-president of the Association of Women Principals of New York City. She was a member of the Special New York City Commission of the National Educational Association, and the Executive Committee of the Normal College Alumnae. She was also a charter member of the Society of Political Study. Blake favored woman suffrage.

== Activism ==
Blake was a peace activist and a suffragist. Among her peace activism activities she served as the New York Chair of the Women's International League for Peace and Freedom. Included in her suffragist activities she marched with hundreds of teachers in the 1915 New York parade sponsored by the Woman Suffrage Association.

Blake died in St. Louis, Missouri on February 2, 1950.

== Selected works ==
- Graded poetry; first and second years; ed. by Katharine D. Blake and Georgia Alexander. N. Y., Charles E. Merrill Co., 1905. (Contains selections for memorizing and for reading to the children and by the children.)
- Graded poetry; third year; ed. by Katharine D. Blake and Georgia Alexander. N. Y., Maynard, Merrill & Co., 1905. (Contains selections for memorizing and for reading to the children and by the children.)
- Graded poetry; fourth year; ed. by Katharine D. Blake and Georgia Alexander. N. Y., Maynard, Merrill & Co., 1905. (Contains selections for memorizing and for reading to the children and by the children. Some of the selections are also suitable for recitations.)
- Graded poetry; fifth year; ed. by Katharine D. Blake and Georgia Alexander. N. Y., Charles E. Merrill Co., 1905. (Contains selections for memorizing and for reading to the children and by the children. Some of the selections are also suitable for recitations.)
- Graded poetry; sixth year; ed. by Katharine D. Blake and Georgia Alexander. N. Y., Charles E. Merrill Co., 1905. (Selections from standard writers suitable for memory gems and recitations.)
- Graded poetry; seventh year; ed. by Katharine D. Blake and Georgia Alexander. N. Y., Charles E. Merrill Co., 1906. (Selections from standard writers suitable for memory gems and recitations.)
- Graded poetry; eighth year; ed. by Katharine D. Blake and Georgia Alexander. N. Y., Charles E. Merrill Co., 1906. (Selections from standard writers suitable for memory gems and recitations.)
