= Grace Alexander =

American writer and journalist (1872–1951)

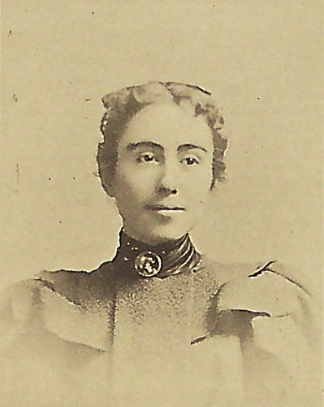
- Portrait photo from The Indianapolis woman, 1896
- Born: Grace Caroline Alexander; June 14, 1872; Indianapolis, Indiana
- Died: October 1, 1951 (aged 79); Indianapolis
- Resting place: Crown Hill Cemetery, Indianapolis
- Education: Indiana University
- Occupations: writer; journalist; teacher
- Relatives: Georgia Alexander (sister)
- Writing career
- Genres: plays; novels; textbooks
- Notable work: Judith

Grace Alexander (1872–1951) was an American writer, journalist, and teacher. She wrote in several genres including plays, novels, and textbooks. Her work as society editor of Indianapolis News included music and drama criticism, as well as a weekly women's section. With her sister, Georgia Alexander, Grace owned and operated a women's boarding house in Indianapolis, Indiana.

== Early life and education ==
Grace Caroline Alexander was born on June 14, 1872, in Indianapolis, Indiana. Her parents were George N. and Caroline (Nichols) Alexander.

She was educated at Indianapolis High School (later renamed Shortridge High School), and Indiana University (1912).

== Career ==
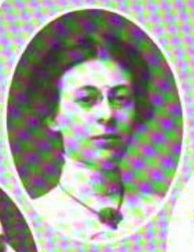
Photo from The Lyre of Alpha Chi Omega, 1913

Alexander taught English in Indianapolis schools for many years. In 1891–1903, she was a society editor, editorial writer, and music critic of the Indianapolis News. She wrote all of the musical criticisms, as well as many of the dramatic comments. Every Saturday, the News published a supplement of four pages directed to women. A considerable amount of Alexander's time was occupied every week in editing this supplement. After 1904, she was a professional manuscript reader at the Bobbs-Merrill Company. In 1913, she became the editor of Delta Zeta's The Lamp.

With her sister, Georgia Alexander, Grace was the author of Child Classics, The Fourth Reader (1909), Child Classics, The Fifth Reader (1909), and Child Classics: The Sixth Reader (1917). Grace Alexander was the author of Judith and other publications.

Grace and Georgia owned and operated Aberdeen House, a private hotel in Indianapolis.

== Personal life ==
In religion, she was Episcopalian. Alexander was a member of the Contemporary Club.

Grace Alexander died in Indianapolis, on October 1, 1951, with burial in that city's Crown Hill Cemetery.

== Selected works ==
- A comedy at court; a play in 4 acts, founded on an incident in Alexander Dumas' novel, "The three musketeers", 1898
- Judith: A Story of the Candle-Lit Fifties (illustrated by George Wright), 1906 (text)
- Child Classics, The Fourth Reader (with Georgia Alexander), 1909
- Child Classics, The Fifth Reader (with Georgia Alexander), 1909 (text)
- Child Classics: The Sixth Reader (with Georgia Alexander), 1917 (text)
- Prince Cinderella, 1921 (text)
