= Roda Selleck =

American painter and art instructor

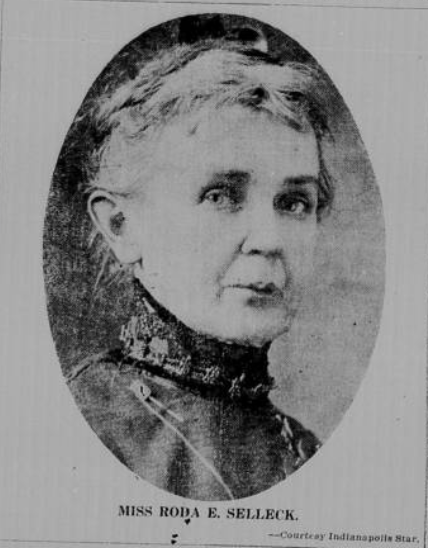
- Born: September 6, 1848; Utica, Michigan, United States
- Died: November 15, 1924 (aged 76); Indianapolis, Indiana, United States
- Resting place: Utica Cemetery
- Education: Syracuse University, Harvard University
- Known for: Teaching art at Shortridge High School and John Herron Art Institute

Roda E. Selleck (September 6, 1848 – November 15, 1924) was an American painter and art instructor.

A native of Utica, Michigan, Selleck studied at Syracuse University and with Denman W. Ross at Harvard University; she also spent time at the University of Illinois at Urbana–Champaign, and Purdue University, She began her career as an educator teaching at the State Normal School in Saginaw, Michigan, later becoming a supervisor; in 1881, she began teaching English and Latin in Indianapolis Public Schools. She was soon assigned to teach art at Indianapolis High School, later renamed Shortridge High School, where she remained until her death in 1924. Though hired to teach drawing, she also instructed her students in the use of charcoal and watercolor, and also provided them with a grounding in art history and art appreciation. By the 1890s, she had won recognition for introducing "craftwork" – leather, pottery, jewelry, and metalwork – into the curriculum. She taught pottery at the John Herron Art Institute from 1915 until 1916, and developed a line of pottery, Selridge Pottery, marked "SP" and produced by pupils at the high school. So dedicated was she to ceramic work that she often remained at the school until the early morning hours minding the kiln. For 10 years, Selleck taught at the Herron Art Institute's summer school at Winona Lake, Indiana; she later collaborated with the Pratt Institute to develop a public-school art curriculum, and she spent some time on the board of the directors of the Herron Art Institute. She was a leader in the Arts and Crafts movement in Indianapolis, and was instrumental in causing Indiana to become the first state to have a standardized art exhibition at its state fair. Upon her death, an art gallery in the Shortridge High School building was dedicated her honor; it remained in place until the building was converted for use as a junior high school.

Among Selleck's pupils included artists Janet Payne Bowles and Ada Walter Shulz. She is buried in the Utica Cemetery in her hometown.
