= Georgia Alexander =

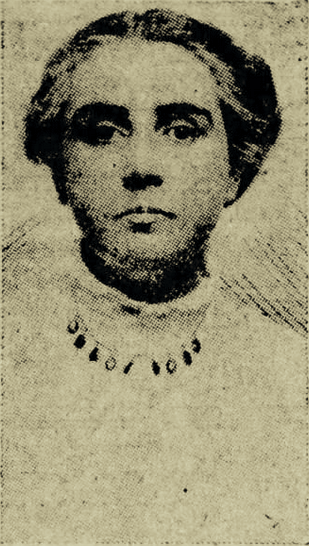
- Portrait photo from The Indianapolis Star, 1914
- Born: 1868; Indianapolis, Indiana
- Died: November 21, 1928 (aged 59–60); Indianapolis
- Resting place: Crown Hill Cemetery, Indianapolis
- Education: University of Chicago; Harvard University; Teachers College, Columbia University
- Occupations: textbook author; educator
- Relatives: Grace Alexander (sister)
- Writing career
- Genre: textbooks
- Notable works: Three books series: Child Classics (with Grace Alexander); Alexander-Dewey Arithmetic (with John Dewey); Graded Poetry (with Katherine Devereux Blake)

Georgia Alexander (1868 – November 21, 1928) was an American educator, author, and editor of public school textbooks. Her book series included: Child Classics (assisted by her sister, Grace Alexander); Alexander-Dewey Arithmetic (with John Dewey); and Graded Poetry (with Katherine Devereux Blake). For many years, she served as district superintendent of schools in Indianapolis, Indiana, U.S.

== Early life and education ==
Georgia Alexander was born in Indianapolis in 1868.

Alexander attended Indianapolis High School (now Shortridge High School), and graduated from the Indianapolis Normal School. She later attended the University of Chicago and Harvard University and received her M.A. degree at Teachers College, Columbia University.

== Career ==
As a young woman, she was known as one of the foremost organists of Indianapolis, and at different times, was organist at the city's Christ Episcopal Church and the Episcopal Cathedral.

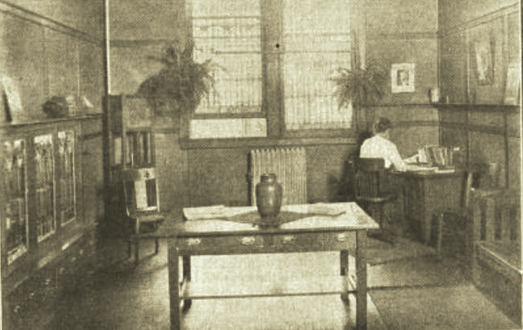
Alexander in her office in Indianapolis School 45 (1914)

Alexander's career as supervising principal extended more than 20 years. When the school system was changed, she became a district superintendent, serving in that capacity until her retirement in 1925.

Her earliest published work was a compilation of poetry for school reading. She was also the author of a set of readers and a speller used in Indiana public schools for ten years. The Child's Classics Readers, of which Georgia Alexander was an author and in the preparation of which her sister, Grace Alexander, assisted, were awarded a five-year contract in 1914 by the Indianapolis school district. At Columbia University, she met Dr. John Dewey, a professor of psychology, with whom she collaborated in editing the Alexander-Dewey Arithmetic.

She was a member of the educational council of the National Education Association, an organization with a limited membership of 100 U.S. educators. She spoke before meetings of that body and lectured on educational matters in 15 states. She was also a member of St. Paul's Episcopal Church, Indianapolis Art Association, League of Women Voters, American Association of University Women, Contemporary Club, and the Indiana Council of International Relations. Alexander served as a Director of the Woman's Franchise League of Indiana, which was affiliated with the National American Woman Suffrage Association.

== Death ==
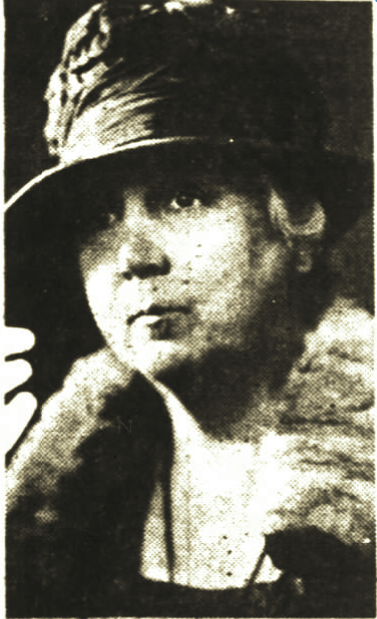
Photo from The Indianapolis News, 1928

She died in Indianapolis, on November 21, 1928, in a private hotel she owned and operated with her sister, Grace Alexander. Burial was in that city's Crown Hill Cemetery.

== Selected works ==
- A Spelling Book; Georgia Alexander. Published by Longmans, Green, 1907. (text)

=== Child Classics ===
- Child Classics, The Primer; Georgia Alexander, with pictures by Fanny Y. Cory. Published by Bobbs-Merrill Company
- Child Classics, First First Reader; Georgia Alexander, with pictures by Sarah Stilwell Weber and Sarah K. Smith. The Bobbs-Merrill Co.
- Child Classics, The Second Reader; Georgia Alexander, with pictures by Alice Barber Stephens, Sarah Stillwell Weber, and Sarah K. Smith. Published by The Bobbs-Merrill Co.
- Child Classics, The Third Reader; Georgia Alexander, with pictures by Alice Barber Stephens, Sarah K. Smith, and Fanny Y. Cory. Published by The Bobbs-Merrill Co.
- Child Classics, The Fourth Reader; Georgia Alexander and Grace Alexander, with illustrations. Published by The Bobbs-Merrill Co.
- Child Classics, The Fifth Reader; Georgia Alexander and Grace Alexander, with illustrations. 1909 (text)
- Child Classics: The Sixth Reader; Georgia Alexander and Grace Alexander, with illustrations. 1917 (text)

=== The Alexander-Dewey Arithmetic ===
- The Alexander-Dewey Arithmetic: Elementary Book; Georgia Alexander, edited by John Dewey. Published by Longmans, Green and Co., 1921. (text)
- The Alexander-Dewey Arithmetic: Imtermediate Book; Georgia Alexander, edited by John Dewey. Published by Longmans, Green and Co., 1921. (text)
- The Alexander-Dewey Arithmetic" Advanced Book; Georgia Alexander, edited by John Dewey. Published by Longmans, Green and Co., 1921. (text)
- The Alexander-Dewey Arithmetic: Book Five; Georgia Alexander & John Dewey. Published by Longmans, Green and Co., 1921. (text)

=== Graded poetry ===
- Graded poetry; first and second years; ed. by Katharine D. Blake and Georgia Alexander. N. Y., Charles E. Merrill Co., 1905. (Contains selections for memorizing and for reading to the children and by the children.)
- Graded poetry; third year; ed. by Katharine D. Blake and Georgia Alexander. N. Y., Maynard, Merrill & Co., 1905. (Contains selections for memorizing and for reading to the children and by the children.)
- Graded poetry; fourth year; ed. by Katharine D. Blake and Georgia Alexander. N. Y., Maynard, Merrill & Co., 1905. (Contains selections for memorizing and for reading to the children and by the children. Some of the selections are also suitable for recitations.)
- Graded poetry; fifth year; ed. by Katharine D. Blake and Georgia Alexander. N. Y., Charles E. Merrill Co., 1905. (Contains selections for memorizing and for reading to the children and by the children. Some of the selections are also suitable for recitations.)
- Graded poetry; sixth year; ed. by Katharine D. Blake and Georgia Alexander. N. Y., Charles E. Merrill Co., 1905. (Selections from standard writers suitable for memory gems and recitations.)
- Graded poetry; seventh year; ed. by Katharine D. Blake and Georgia Alexander. N. Y., Charles E. Merrill Co., 1906. (Selections from standard writers suitable for memory gems and recitations.)
- Graded poetry; eighth year; ed. by Katharine D. Blake and Georgia Alexander. N. Y., Charles E. Merrill Co., 1906. (Selections from standard writers suitable for memory gems and recitations.)
