= Mark Sourian =

American film producer and studio executive

Mark Sourian is an American film producer and studio executive.

== Personal life ==
Sourian grew up in the Lenox Hill section of New York City, son of two college professors. He graduated from Public School 6, Bronx High School of Science and, in 1995, magna cum laude, from Harvard College. He married Stephanie Moy in September 2016. They live in Los Angeles.

== Career ==
Sourian has worked most of his career as a film studio production executive, most notably as co-president of Production at DreamWorks from 2009 to 2012, where he oversaw production of The Ring, The Ring Two, Sweeney Todd, Real Steel, The Kite Runner, Things We Lost in the Fire and House of Sand and Fog, among others, and, beginning in 2015, as Executive Vice-president at Universal, where he oversaw production on The Fate of the Furious. In between studio posts, from 2012 to 2015, he worked as an independent producer with an exclusive first-look deal with DreamWorks when he produced Need for Speed and executive produced Delivery Man, A Dog's Purpose and Ghost in the Shell. He served as executive producer of the series Echo 3 for Apple TV+ in 2022. In 2023, he took over as President of Production at The Chosen Inc., overseeing The Chosen, commencing with its third season.
