= Lillie Devereux Blake =

American woman suffragist, reformer and writer

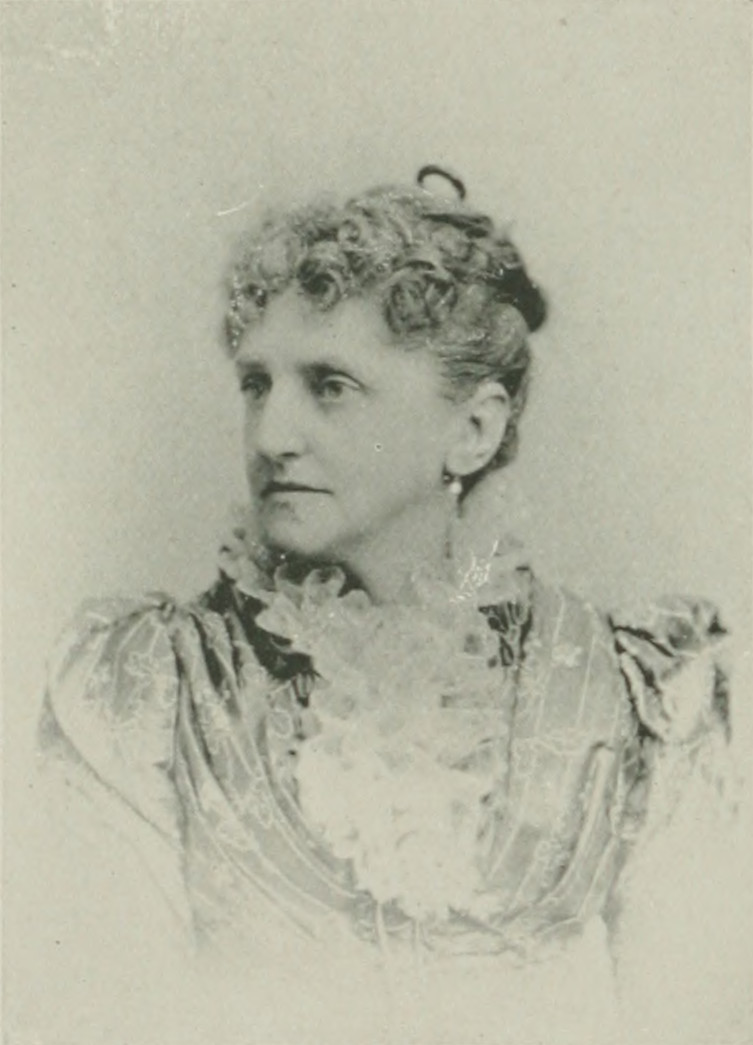
- Born: Elizabeth Johnson Devereux; August 12, 1833; Raleigh, North Carolina
- Died: December 30, 1913 (aged 80); Englewood, New Jersey
- Education: Miss Apthorp's School for Girls; Yale
- Occupations: writer, reformer, suffragist
- Spouses: Frank Geoffrey Quay Umsted (m. 1855; died 1859) Grinfill Blake (m. 1866)
- Children: Katherine Devereux Blake
- Relatives: William Samuel Johnson; Samuel Johnson; Jonathan Edwards
- Writing career
- Pen name: Tiger Lily
- Language: English

Signature
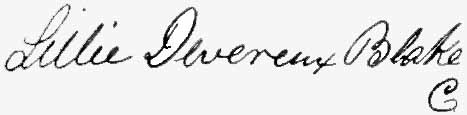

Lillie Devereux Blake, pen name, Tiger Lily; (August 12, 1833 – December 30, 1913) was an American woman suffragist, reformer, and writer, born in Raleigh, North Carolina and educated in New Haven, Connecticut. In her early years, Blake wrote several novels and for the press. In 1869, she became actively interested in the woman suffrage movement and devoted herself to pushing the reform, arranging conventions, getting up public meetings, writing articles, and occasionally making lecture tours. A woman of strong affections and marked domestic tastes, she did not allow her public work to interfere with her home duties, and her speaking outside of New York City was almost wholly done in the summer, when her family was naturally scattered. In 1873, she made an application for the opening of Columbia College to young women as well as young men, presenting a class of young women students qualified to enter the university. This work eventually led to the establishment of Barnard College. In 1874, she published a reform novel entitled Fettered for Life; or, Lord and Master that dramatized the struggles of women from various social classes.

In 1879, she was unanimously elected president of the New York State Woman Suffrage Association, an office that she held for eleven years. During that period, she made a tour of the state every summer, arranged conventions, and each year conducted a legislative campaign, many times addressing committees of the senate and assembly. In 1880, largely through her efforts the school suffrage law was passed. In each year woman suffrage bills were introduced and pushed to a vote in one or both of the branches of the legislature. In 1883, the Rev. Morgan Dix, D.D., delivered a series of Lenten discourses on "Woman", presenting a most conservative view of her duties. Blake replied to each lecture in an able address, advocating more advanced ideas. Her lectures were printed under the title of "Woman's Place To-day" (New York) and sold in large numbers. Among the reforms in which she was actively interested were that of securing matrons to take charge of women detained in police stations. As early as 1871, she spoke and wrote on the subject, and through her labors, in 1881 and 1882, bills were passed by the assembly, but failed to become laws, however, because of the opposition of the New York City Police Department. She continued to agitate the subject, public sentiment was finally aroused and in 1891, a law was passed enforcing this reform.

The employment of women as census takers was first urged in 1880 by Blake. The bills giving seats to saleswomen, ordering the presence of a woman physician in every insane asylum where women were detained, and many other beneficent measures were presented or aided by her.

In 1886, Blake was elected president of the New York City Woman Suffrage League. She attended conventions and made speeches in most of the U.S. states and territories and she addressed committees of both houses of Congress as well as the legislatures of New York and Connecticut. She authored the 1891 law providing for matrons in the police stations.

== Early years, education, marriages ==
As Elizabeth Johnson Devereux, Blake was born in Raleigh, North Carolina. Her mother was Sarah Elizabeth Johnson, the daughter of Judge Samuel William Johnson, of Stratford, Connecticut. Blake was a granddaughter of the Hon. William Samuel Johnson, member of the Stamp Act Congress, of the Fourth and Fifth Continental Congresses, and of the Federal Convention, as well as a senator from Connecticut and president of Columbia College. His father and her great-grandfather was the Rev. Samuel Johnson, D.D., the founder and first president of Columbia College when it was entitled King's College. Her father was George Pollok Devereux, a wealthy southern gentleman of Irish descent on his father's side. Her paternal grandmother, Frances Pollok, was a descendant of Sir Thomas Pollok, one of the early governors of North Carolina under the Lords Proprietaries. Both parents of Blake were descended from the Rev. Jonathan Edwards, D.D.

Blake spent much of her early childhood in Roanoke, Virginia. It was Mr. Devereux who called his daughter "Lilly", giving her the name she later would adopt as her own. Her father, a plantation owner in North Carolina, died in 1837. His widow and daughters removed to New Haven, where Mrs. Devereux was widely known for the generous hospitality that she dispensed from her home, "Maple Cottage".

Blake studied at Miss Apthorp's School for Girls in New Haven before taking the Yale College course from tutors at home. Her close connection to Yale turned into a minor scandal. She was a renowned belle, who at age sixteen wrote that she intended to redress the wrongs done to her gender by trifling with men's hearts. Although she abandoned this particular formulation of feminism, the difficulties of expressing her independence within the limited roles allowed by her social station would prove a continuing theme in her life. In this case, Yale undergraduate William H. L. Barnes was expelled for implying that he had been involved with her in what would have been a disgraceful affair. The student was an admirer whose affections were too serious. She rejected him and he retaliated with stories implying a sexual relationship. He was expelled by the college for impugning her character. In her autobiography, Blake denied that an affair between them had taken place and expressed regret that the student had been expelled. She also noted that his vindictive stories were not taken very seriously in social circles, as she still received offers of marriage.

In 1855, she married Frank Geoffrey Quay Umsted, a Philadelphia lawyer. With him she made her home in St. Louis, Missouri and New York City. Her first daughter. Elizabeth, was born in 1857; her second daughter, Katherine, was born the following year.

In 1866, she married Grinfill Blake, a wealthy New York merchant, and after that time, made her home in that city.

== Career ==
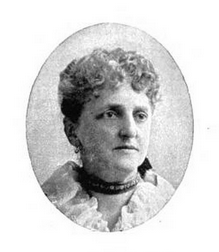
Lillie Devereux Blake (1894)

=== Writer ===
Writing for The Knickerbocker magazine in 1858 she had told a fictional story of a woman, Melissa, who murdered her tutor who did not return her love, by abandoning him in a cave without a lamp. According to the story, Melissa went back to the cave fifteen years later to end her misery. Researcher Joe Nickell writing for Skeptical Inquirer magazine in 2017 explains that this gives "Credulous believers in ghosts... confirmation of their superstitious beliefs" who tell of hearing Melissa weeping and calling out for her murdered tutor. Nickell states that it is common to hear sounds in caves which "the brain interprets (as words and weeping)... it's called pareidolia". Nickell does not think that Blake tried to create a ghost story, but the 1858 story was embellished over the years adding that Melissa had died of tuberculosis explaining why they heard coughing in the cave. There have been several versions of the tale. Melissa is pure fiction, but Blake did visit Mammoth Cave with her husband Frank Umsted, "traveling by train, steamer, and stagecoach".

Mr. Umsted died in 1859 in an apparent suicide, leaving her with two children to support. A handsome fortune she had inherited was largely impaired, so the young widow began to work in real earnest, writing stories, sketches, and letters for several leading periodicals. She had already begun to write for the press, one of her first stories, "A Lonely House", having appeared in the Atlantic Monthly. She also had published Southwold (1859), a novel, that achieved a decided success.

Most of the time, she made her home with her mother in Stratford, Connecticut, but she spent some winters in Washington, D.C. and New York. In 1862, she published a second novel, entitled Rockford, and subsequently wrote several romances.

Blake's early fiction was modeled on the popular sentimental fiction of the time, but became subversive. Her stories for popular magazines, published under her own name and various pen names, depicted strong female protagonists in standard sentimental plots that reflected her own resistance to the roles that she was expected to fill in her own life. Her later fiction included the realism that she gained from her journalism experience. It also showed a more explicit consciousness of women's issues. Her most famous novel Fettered for Life, or, Lord and Master: A Story of To-Day is an attempt to draw attention to the myriad of complex issues facing women. What generated the most money and fame for Blake, however, was her job as a correspondent in Washington, D.C. during the Civil War. She was contracted as a correspondent for several publications, including the New York Evening Post, New York World, Philadelphia Press, and Forney's War Press.

She was an avid writer and her writings included: Fettered for Life (1874), a multi-plot novel dealing with women's material, social, and legal conditions in New York City; Woman's Place To-day (1883), a series of lectures in reply to the lenten sermons by Dr. Morgan Dix on the "Calling of a Christian Woman"; and A Daring Experiment (1894).

Like other women writers of her time she was expected to show interest in feminine pursuits by demonstrating culinary competence or publishing her own recipes, which she did in The Women Suffrage Cookbook, including one for "Last Century Blackberry Pudding".

Blake was the author of the law providing for matrons in the police stations, passed in 1891.

==== Civil War correspondent ====
When the Civil War broke out, she worked as a correspondent for several newspapers, including the New York Evening Post, the New York World, Philadelphia Prost, and the War Press. Blake's detailed and riveting accounts of the unfolding events brought her acclaim and fame. Visiting the White House, she met with President Abraham Lincoln, Andrew Johnson, and General Ulysses S. Grant.

=== Suffrage ===
Blake testified before the New York Constitutional Commission of 1873 in support for women's suffrage. Along with Matilda Joslyn Gage, she signed the 1876 Centennial Women's Rights Declaration. She was president of the New York State Woman's Suffrage Association from 1879 to 1890 and of the New York City Woman's Suffrage League from 1886 to 1900. In 1886 she and a group of suffragists, including her young daughter, Katherine, boarded a cattle barge to protest the hypocrisy of dedicating the Statue of Liberty to a country in which women still could not vote. Blake was also the chair of the National American Women's Suffrage Association's Committee on legislative Advice from 1895, when it was founded, until 1899, when it was effectively dissolved by Susan B. Anthony.

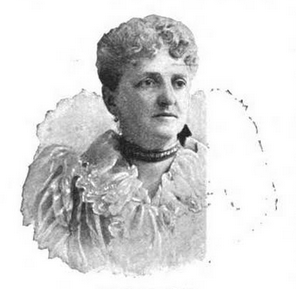
Lillie Devereux Blake (1895)

Blake completely broke ties with the National American Woman Suffrage Association in 1900 when Susan B. Anthony, who was retiring as the leader of the organization, selected Carrie Chapman Catt and Anna Howard to succeed her. Blake had withdrawn her candidacy for the position in the interests of harmony. For years, Blake and Anthony had disagreed on the basic purpose of the women's movement. Anthony wanted to focus solely on suffrage; Blake wanted to pursue a broader course of reform. This split in strategy was caused by a deeper theoretical divide.

==== Blake common nature theory ====
Blake developed a theory of gender that was radical for her time. She argued that gender roles are learned behaviors and that women and men shared a common nature, asserting that people share a common nature but are trained in gender roles. Therefore, Blake asserted that women should have the same rights as men in all areas. However, Anthony and her followers emphasized a unique nature of women in their separate sphere, and asserted that innate moral authority was the justification for their right to suffrage. This difference in perception, among others that Blake supported, helps to explain the way she is remembered, or not remembered, in the context of the woman's movement.

=== National Legislative League ===
Blake went on to create the National Legislative League. She worked on improving immigration laws for women and furthering equality in society. In addition, Blake helped establish pensions for Civil War nurses. She worked on granting mothers joint custody of their children. She wanted to have women involved in civic affairs and encouraged them to study law in school.

=== Promotion of co-education ===
She was one of the active promoters of the movement that resulted in the founding of Barnard College. In 1869, she visited the Women's Bureau in New York and soon after, began speaking throughout the United States in support of enfranchisement of women. She earned a reputation as a freethinker and gained fame when she attacked the well-known lectures of Morgan Dix, a clergyman who asserted that woman's inferiority was supported by the Bible. In her lectures, published as Woman's Place To-Day she rejected this idea and, in one instance, Blake countered by asserting that—if Eve was inferior to Adam because she was created after him—then by the same logic Adam was inferior to the fishes.

PS 6 on the Upper East Side of Manhattan is named after her, Lillie D. Blake School.
