= Ethel Black Kealing =

American author

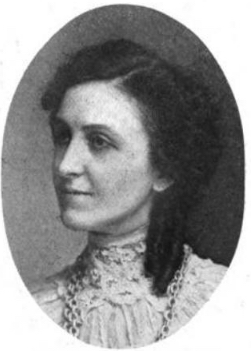
- Ethel Black Kealing, from a 1908 publication
- Born: November 22, 1877; Indiana, US
- Died: June 14, 1960 (aged 82); San Bernardino, California, US
- Other names: E. B. Kealing, Jonathan Parker (pen name)
- Occupation: Writer
- Notable work: Desra of the Egyptians (1910); A Princess of the Orient (1918)

Ethel Black Kealing (November 22, 1877 – June 14, 1960) was an American writer and arts patron from Indiana. Her novel Desra of the Egyptians (1910) is sometimes counted as an example of early science fiction and fantasy writing by women.

== Early life ==
Ethel Black Kealing was born and raised near Indianapolis, Indiana, the daughter of Samuel Kealing and Margaret Black Kealing. She graduated from Shortridge High School. In the 1930s she attended the school of music at Butler University.

== Career ==
Books by Kealing included Desra of the Egyptians: A Romance of the Earlier Centuries (a "lost world" novel, 1910), and A Princess of the Orient (1918). She wrote a three-act play, Madame Lavendere (1911). She also wrote articles for magazines. In "The Ethics of Conversation" (1905, Suggestion magazine), Kealing counsels the friends of sick people to avoid expressing "gloomy, despairing thoughts" at bedside: "Teach yourself to eliminate that part of your conversation which would strengthen the current of ill effecting thoughts, within the patient's mind."

Kealing also wrote a song, "My Heart" (1909, music by Robert Speroy), dedicated to her brother, Clifford C. Kealing; and composed "Linger Near" (1909), music for voice and piano. She sometimes used the pen name "Jonathan Parker" when her poetry was published. She and her older sister Ruth E. Kealing ran a fine arts studio in Indianapolis, and organized exhibits of Indiana art, music, and literature from the mid-1920s into the late 1930s.

Kealing was a member of the American Esperanto Association, and chaired the telephone committee of the Indiana Woman's Republican Club.

== Personal life ==
Ethel and Ruth Kealing moved to Pasadena, California with their mother in 1939. Ethel Kealing died in San Bernardino, California in 1960, aged 82 years.
