= Shortridge High School =

Public high school in Indianapolis, Indiana, US

- U.S. National Register of Historic Places
- U.S. Historic district – Contributing property
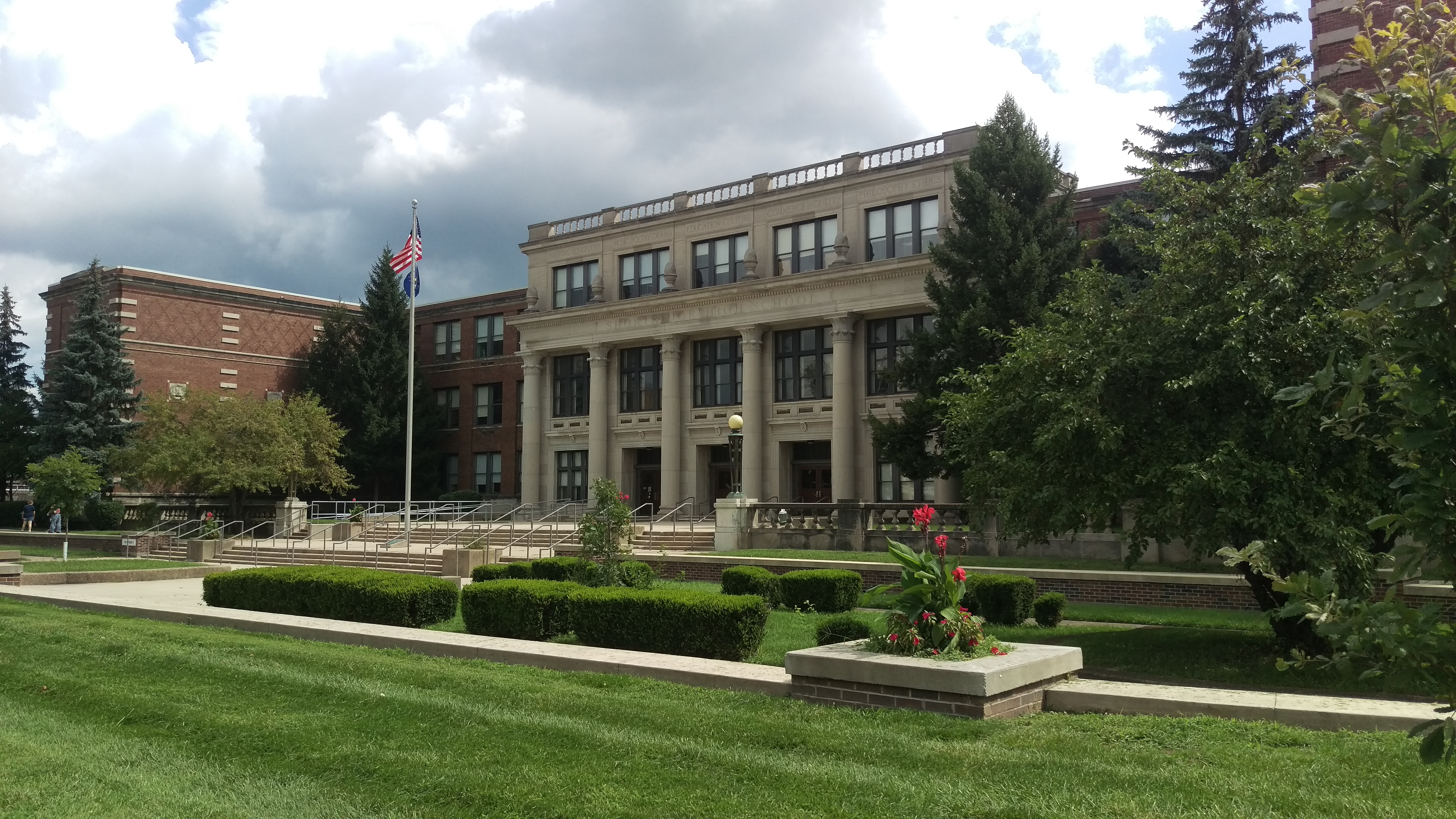
- Shortridge High School.

- Location within Indianapolis Location within Indiana Location within the United States
- Location: 3401 N. Meridian St., 46208 Indianapolis, Indiana, U.S.
- Coordinates: 39°49′8″N 86°9′19″W
- Area: 10.9 acres (4.4 ha)
- Built: 1927
- Architect: Kopf & Deery
- Architectural style: Classical Revival
- Website: shortridge.myips.org
- Part of: Shortridge-Meridian Street Apartments Historic District (ID00000195)
- NRHP reference No.: 83000078
- Added to NRHP: September 15, 1983

Shortridge High School is a public high school located in Indianapolis, Indiana, United States. Shortridge is the home of the International Baccalaureate and arts and humanities programs of the Indianapolis Public Schools district (IPS). Originally known as Indianapolis High School, it opened in 1864 and is Indiana's oldest free public high school. New Albany High School (1853) was Indiana's first public high school, but was not initially free.

Author Kurt Vonnegut Jr., Shortridge class of 1940, said that Shortridge was:

"... my dream of an America with great public schools. I thought we should be the envy of the world with our public schools. And I went to such a public school. So I knew that such a school was possible. Shortridge High School in Indianapolis produced not only me, but the head writer on the I LOVE LUCY show (Madelyn Pugh). And, my God, we had a daily paper, we had a debating team, had a fencing team. We had a chorus, a jazz band, a serious orchestra. And all this with a Great Depression going on. And I wanted everybody to have such a school."

== History ==
=== 19th century ===
Indianapolis High School (renamed Shortridge High School in 1896) opened in 1864 as the state of Indiana's first free public high school. Its original location (1864–1867) was in the former Ward 1 Elementary School at Vermont and New Jersey Streets.

The second location (1867–1872) was in Circle Hall on the northwest quadrant of Monument Circle. The third location (1872–1885) was the former Baptist Female Seminary at Michigan and Pennsylvania Streets. This building was deemed unsafe and torn down to make way for a fourth building (1885–1928) on the same site. (Classes met in area churches while the new building was under construction.) Due to population shifts in Indianapolis in the 1920s, Indianapolis Public Schools decided to build a fifth building at the northeast corner of 34th and Meridian Streets.

Construction began in 1927, and the school opened in 1928. This fifth iteration is the school's current building.

Abraham C. Shortridge was recruited to become school superintendent in 1863. Shortridge was a strict educator when it came to drilling students and faculty alike. However, he was also innovative in many ways, including the hiring of female teachers and the admission of African-American students. Sarah D. Allen Oren Haynes, who taught at the high school from 1869 to 1873, later became the first female state librarian of Indiana and the first female professor at Purdue University. By 1878, Shortridge High School served 502 students. Roda Selleck, who began teaching art at the school in the 1880s, soon won acclaim for introducing "craftwork" – leather, pottery, jewelry, and metalwork – to the curriculum, and later developed a line of pottery, "Selridge Pottery", designed by students. She remained at the school until her death in 1924.

In 1876, Mary Alice Rann was the first African-American student to graduate from Shortridge High School. There was a push for either integration in schools or the building of a new school for African-American students. Abraham Shortridge, who had become the superintendent of IPS schools at the time, fought against the arguments from white parents, asking if they wanted to pay the taxes to build a new school just for her. She was the first of a number of black students to graduate from Shortridge prior to the opening of Crispus Attucks High School.

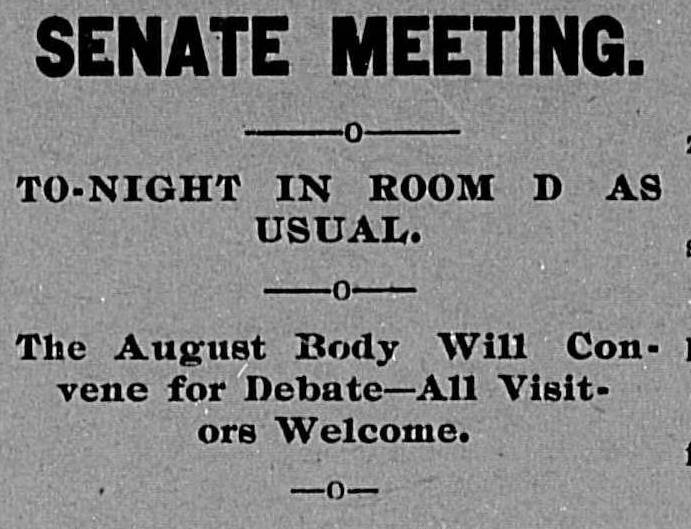
Announcement of an upcoming Senate meeting, from The Daily Echo (1903-09-25)

The Shortridge Senate was created in 1887 by Laura Donnan. High school juniors and seniors would meet at 2:30 every Friday afternoon. The senate was created in order to teach students about public speaking and politics. Based on the annual Shortridge yearbook of 1918, the talking points included: daylight saving time, workmen's compensation, women's suffrage, amendments to abolish jury trials, eight-hour law, the metric system, and many others.

Found in senate records located at the Indiana Historical Society. Written in 1914–1915 by the senate of Shortridge. September 18, eight female students were instated into the senate. The senate was made up of a majority of young women. Senators are actually students representing each actual Senator. In the case of women's suffrage, the debates the students had involved included arguments that were happening in the real debates and spanned three days, from September 25 to October 9, 1914.

=== Early 20th century ===
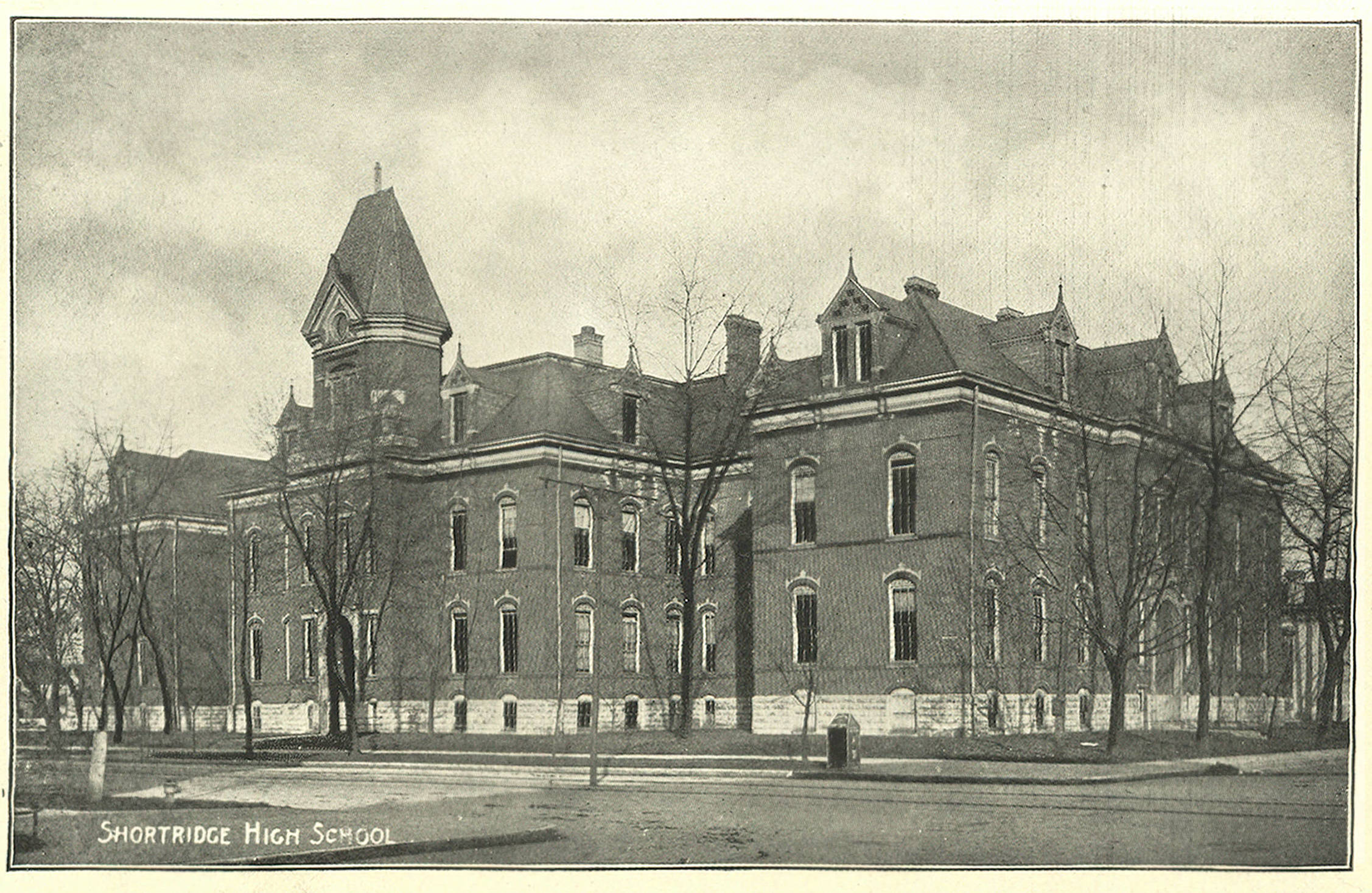
Shortridge High School in 1904

In a 1903 football game against Wabash College, Wabash College coach Tug Wilson substituted an African-American left tackle by the name of Samuel Gordon, and the Shortridge captain "made a scene", forfeiting the game.

Shortridge students and faculty were involved in relief efforts for World War I. Faculty in charge included Flora Love, Rosa M. R. Mikels, Mary E. Sullivan, and Virginia Claybough. Their jobs were typing, filing, and clerical work. Under direction from Red Cross, both students and teachers also knitted socks, hats, and helmets. They also purchased War Bonds. The students and teachers also provided money for the war efforts and marched in parades. Laura Donnan even had a motto in her class that was, “A penny in France is worth two pennies in your pants.”

Although minority students attended Shortridge from its opening, the majority of Shortridge High School students were white. This changed in 1927, when Indianapolis opened its first purposely-segregated all-black school, Crispus Attucks High School; up until then, the city had only followed school segregation by custom and not by law. Notably, the creation of Crispus Attucks was in large part due to the influence of a branch of the Ku Klux Klan led by D.C. Stephenson, on the city's school board. Regardless, those who lived in an area where they could attend either Crispus Attucks High School or Shortridge High School were allowed to choose which school they wanted to attend; many of these students chose to attend Shortridge.

In 1928, Shortridge High School moved from downtown Indianapolis to a new building at its current location at 34th and Meridian Street on the north side of Indianapolis.

The environment in the school in the 1950s was described in the novel Going All The Way by Shortridge High alumnus Dan Wakefield (published in 1970 and adapted to film in 1997). In 1957, a Time Magazine article named Shortridge High as one of the top 38 high schools in the United States. At the same time, however, the school began to lose students to other schools, notably the newly opened North Central High School on the city's far-north side.

=== Civil Rights Movement ===
Due to the changing racial makeup of the neighborhoods that fed Shortridge, some parents on the school's Parent-Teacher Association supported redrawing the Shortridge district to find a more even racial balance. By 1964, some felt that the school had reached a crisis. A protest march that fall from the school to Indianapolis Public Schools offices was supported by 200 students.

In 1965, the Indianapolis Board of School Commissioners turned Shortridge into an all-academic high school. Beginning in the 1966–67 school year, an entrance examination was required for enrollment. In the 1966–67 school year only 272 freshmen enrolled, 46% of whom were black. Though efforts were made over the next four years to increase enrollment, they were not effective. The 1966 elections saw the school board change, including the loss of Richard Lugar, a Shortridge High graduate and academic plan supporter, who ran for, and was elected as, mayor of the city of Indianapolis. By 1967, the new school board voted 5–2 to abolish the short-lived ‘Shortridge Plan’.

As the 1960s progressed, so-called "white flight" in the neighborhoods immediately surrounding the school led to a predominantly-black student body. During the 1950–1970 period, the racial demographics of the Shortridge district began to change rapidly. As an example, the Mapleton-Fall Creek neighborhood, a part of the Shortridge district, changed from 82% white to 20% white).

The United States Department of Justice filed a suit in 1968 charging de jure segregation in Indianapolis. IPS responded with a desegregation plan which addressed only one of the three underlying charges. In 1971, U.S. District Judge S. Hugh Dillin found the IPS Board of School Commissioners to be guilty of de jure segregation.

Many large and small protests and causes occurred at Shortridge during the late 1960s. This was a trend seen at other local high schools, colleges, and American society in general. One in particular is sometimes referred to as "The Shortridge Incident."

In February 1969, Shortridge student Otto Breeding was arrested for "disorderly conduct" after a disagreement with school officials over appropriate clothing. He had been asked to not wear a T-shirt advertising a radical black organization. Students who felt this was unfair attempted to disrupt the school, pulling fire alarms, and chanting “Black Power” in the halls. The next day, an ad hoc group of students presented the assistant principal with four demands. The response to the petition did not satisfy them. The Indianapolis Symphony Orchestra was scheduled to present a concert the next day in the school's historic auditorium, Caleb Mills Hall. Approximately twenty students rose and left as the orchestra played "The Star-Spangled Banner". The protesters then congregated at a youth project run by the Reverend Luther Hicks. Reverend Hicks calmed the students and helped them to plan a non-violent protest. The students returned to Shortridge and gathered in front of the building and shouted various protest chants (e.g. “Say it loud! I’m black and I’m proud.”). As the protest continued, the police were called, and thirty students and adults were taken to the Marion County Jail. Most were charged with resisting arrest and disorderly conduct. One civil rights leader, Griffin Bell, was charged with inciting a riot. Marion County Prosecutor Noble Pearcy attempted to have the minor students declared "incorrigible" in an attempt to stop school unrest. This caused mixed reactions within the community, leading some of the city's religious leaders to side with the students. While the charges wound their way through the courts, a "freedom school" was set up to help the suspended students keep up with their academic work. The case eventually reached the Indiana Supreme Court to decide jurisdiction. Eventually, all charges against the students were dismissed and three civil rights leaders were given fines, with one receiving six months at the Indiana State Prison Farm.

=== Late 20th century ===
Shortridge High School was closed for several years beginning in 1981. Following a major renovation, Shortridge was then reopened in 1984 up as a junior high school for grades 7 and 8. In 1993, grade 6 was added to make Shortridge a middle school.

=== 21st century ===
In 2009, a high school magnet program for grades 9 to 12 that was focused on law and public policy was added. The middle school grades were later dropped. In 2015, the law and public policy magnet program was moved to Arsenal Technical High School and the International Baccalaureate (IB) program was moved from Gambold Preparatory High School to Shortridge High School.

In 2018, the entire Indianapolis Public Schools district was reorganized so that all high school students would choose which school they would attend. Several schools were closed in order to strengthen the four remaining high schools: Shortridge, Crispus Attucks, Washington, and Arsenal Tech.

In addition to providing a typical high school curriculum, each high school now offers a concentrated program in a specific field. Shortridge retained its International Baccalaureate program and added the system's Arts and Humanities program that had been previously hosted at the former Broad Ripple High School. Out of 374 public high schools in Indiana, Shortridge ranked 130th in U.S. News & World Report's 2022 ranking.

In 2013, the band Tenth Avenue North performed in Caleb Mills Auditorium. Previously, in 1981, Carl Perkins also performed there.

== The Shortridge Daily Echo ==
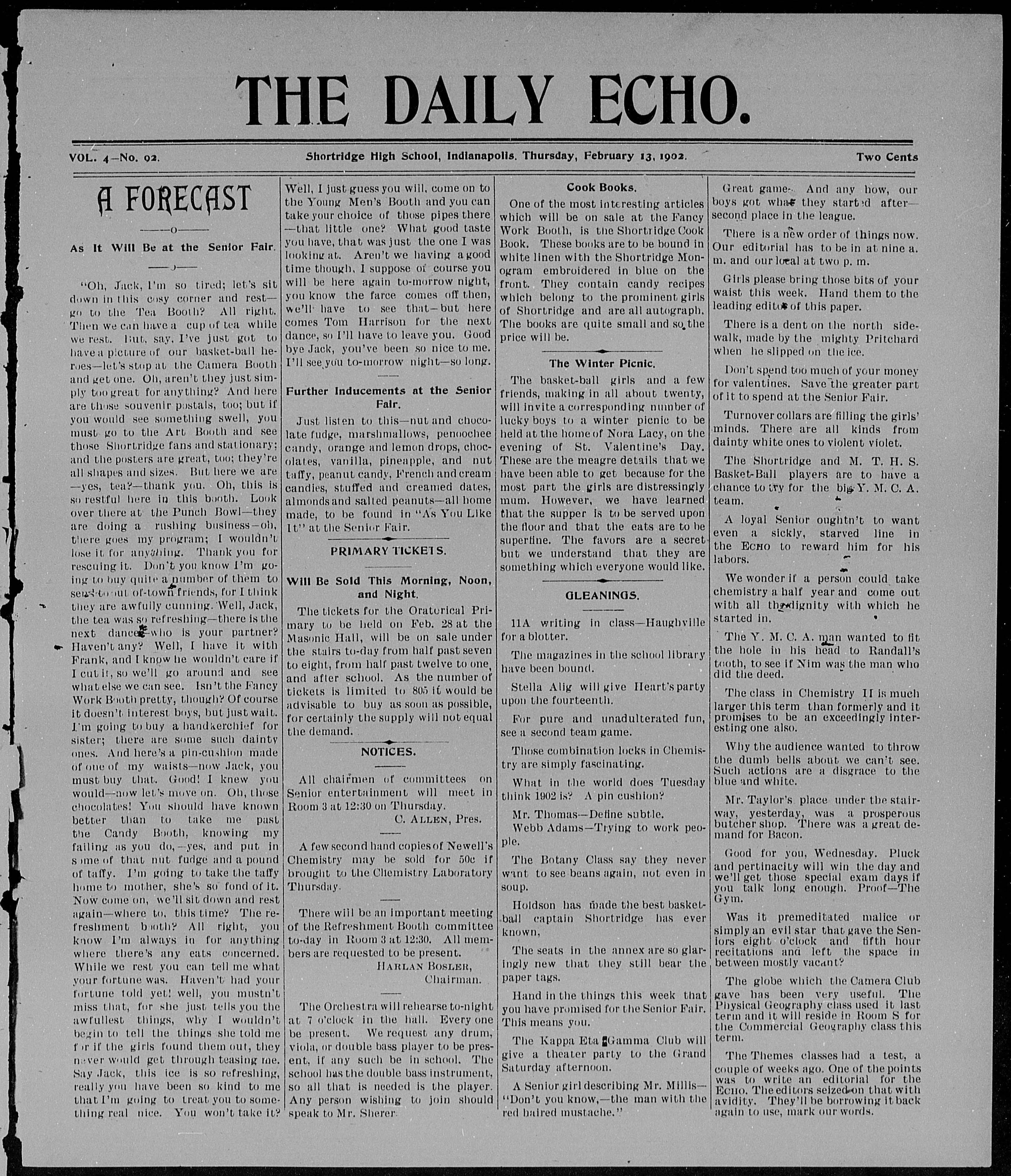
Front page of The Daily Echo from February 13, 1902.

In 1898, the school established a daily newspaper, The Shortridge Daily Echo. It was the first daily high school newspaper in the United States. It continued its daily status until the 1970s, when it was converted to a weekly publication. Kurt Vonnegut and Don Mellett are two notable alumni who served as editors of the Echo.

The paper won many awards over the years. In 1981, its final year of its initial run, a much-abbreviated Echo still won the second place overall award from the Columbia University Scholastic Press Association. The Shortridge Weekly Echo ceased publication with the school's closure in 1981. When Shortridge was reopened as a high school in 2009, students brought back the Echo as well and has been published as either a daily or weekly.

== Sports ==
In a state where basketball is king, Shortridge High had its moment in the sun in the 1967–68 season. The Blue Devils ran up a 17–4 record, reaching the final game of the Indiana state championship, only to lose by eight points; they finished the season at 25–5 (.833). However, over the years Shortridge High won state championships in golf (five titles, three times runners-up), wrestling (twice), track and field (twice, and runners-up twice), and cross country (twice, and runners-up twice).

== Notable alumni ==
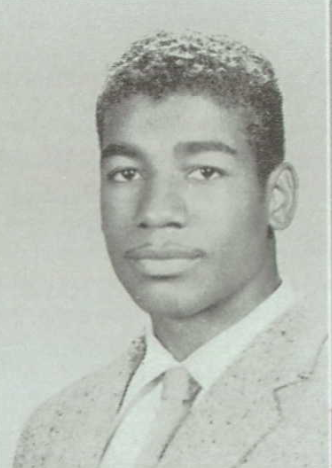
Frank J. Anderson

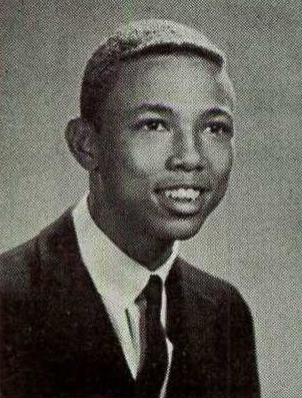
William E. McAnulty Jr.

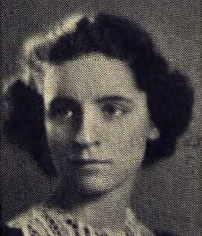
Madelyn Pugh

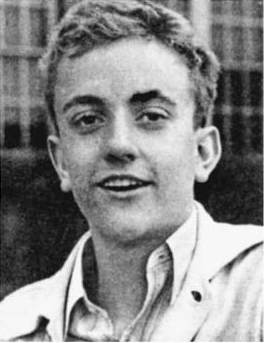
Kurt Vonnegut Jr.

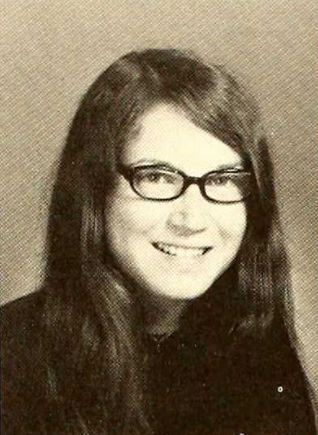
Sharon E. Watkins

- William Afflis – professional player (Green Bay Packers) and professional wrestler known as "Dick the Bruiser", attended but transferred before graduation
- Georgia Alexander – author and educator
- Grace Alexander – writer, journalist, teacher
- Frank J. Anderson – first African-American sheriff of Marion County, Indiana, IHSWCA Hall of Fame wrestler, class of 1956
- Paul Hadley – artist and the creator of the current flag of Indiana
- Mary Ritter Beard – historian and feminist scholar, class of 1893
- Easley Blackwood – composer, pianist and professor of music at University of Chicago; class of 1950
- Claude G. Bowers – newspaperman, historian, author, and US ambassador; class of 1896
- Dan Burton – member of United States House of Representatives; class of 1956
- Mary Fink – civil servant; class of 1934
- Marilyn (Koffman) Glick – co-founder of the Gene B. Glick Co. and philanthropist for the arts and civic institutions, including the Indianapolis Cultural Trail
- Marcellus Greene – football player, class of 1976
- Clinton L. Hare – manager, organizer, football coach, attorney, grocer; class of 1883
- Paul Harmon, management consultant and business author
- Andrew Jacobs Jr. – member of U.S. House of Representatives; class of 1949
- Charles Jordan – professional basketball player with the Indiana Pacers and in, Europe; class of 1972
- Ethel Black Kealing – writer, arts patron in Indianapolis
- Albert William Levi – philosopher, first Ralph Waldo Emerson Award recipient, first Washington University Humanities Chair, and Black Mountain College Rector (1947–1950)
- Bill Libby – sports author
- Richard Lugar – United States Senator; class of 1950
- Wilhelmina Luten—statistician, economics researcher; class of 1923
- Lloyd "Skip" Martin – jazz musician, played in the Shortridge band, and went on to write for Count Basie, Duke Elligton and to play with many big bands such as Glenn Miller and Charlie Barnett; class of 1934
- William E. McAnulty Jr. – attorney, first African American justice on the Kentucky Supreme Court; class of 1965
- Don Mellett – journalist, editor, Pulitzer Prize winner (posthumous); class of 1909
- Emma Messing – secretary, vaudeville performer, and the first woman to work abroad in an American embassy; class of 1889
- Honor Moore – poet and non-fiction writer whose works include The Bishop's Daughter, memoir of relationship with her father, Episcopal Bishop Paul Moore; class of 1963
- Walter Myers Jr. – Justice of the Indiana Supreme Court
- Woody Myers – Indiana state health commissioner
- Madelyn Pugh – writer for I Love Lucy and The Lucy Show; class of 1938
- Henry J. Richardson Jr. – civil rights lawyer and activist, member of the Indiana House of Representatives (1932–1936); class of 1921
- William H. Riker – political scientist, Public Choice formal theorist, elected to National Academy of Sciences (1974), the American Academy of the Arts & Sciences (1975), president of the American Political Science Association (1983);. class of 1938
- Maurice E. Shearer – Brigadier General, Marine Corps, led Marines in World War I Battle of Belleau Wood, France; awarded Navy Cross, Army Distinguished Service Cross, Navy Distinguished Service Medal, Silver Star, French Legion of Honor, aide to Secretary of the Navy Fleet, used USS Indianapolis as his normal flagship, US Ambassador
- Bill Shirley – actor and singer
- Ada Walter Shulz – painter
- Noble Sissle – musician and composer
- Raymond A. Spruance – admiral, commander of Task Force 16 at the Battle of Midway; as Commander of Central Pacific Force, later the Fifth Fleet
- Dave Strack – college basketball coach, class of 1941
- Booth Tarkington – author (attended but did not graduate from Shortridge)
- Wallace Terry – journalist and oral historian; class of 1956
- Kurt Vonnegut – acclaimed best-selling author of Slaughterhouse-Five and other novels, lecturer, professor, World War II veteran; class of 1940
- Kurt Vonnegut Sr. – architect of Vonnegut & Bohn and Vonnegut, Wright & Yeager; class of 1902
- Dan Wakefield – author; class of 1950
- Sharon E. Watkins – general minister and president of Christian Church (Disciples of Christ); delivered sermon at National Prayer Service in Washington, D.C., on January 21, 2009, at invitation of President Barack Obama, class of 1972
- Lebbeus Woods – experimental architect and artist; class of 1959
- Collier Young - producer and writer
- Marguerite Young – English teacher at Shortridge who received international recognition for her 1965 novel Miss MacIntosh, My Darling; class of 1926

== See also ==
- List of schools in Indianapolis
- National Register of Historic Places listings in Center Township, Marion County, Indiana
- List of high schools in Indiana
