= Indiana University–Purdue University Indianapolis Public Art Collection =

University art collection

John Torreano's Mega-Gem on loan from the Indianapolis Museum of Art in the IUPUI Public Art Collection

The IUPUI Public Art Collection, located in Indianapolis, Indiana, United States, consists of more than 30 works of sculpture located outdoors on the campus of Indiana University–Purdue University Indianapolis. IUPUI is a public shared campus of Indiana University and Purdue University that was created in 1969. More than 30,000 students attend IUPUI today and view the sculptures as they walk, bicycle, and drive around the campus.

Especially notable sculptures in the collection include James Wille Faust's The Herron Arch 1 (2005), the Peirce Geodetic Monument (1987), and Steve Wooldridge's Zephyr (1998). Additional sculptures are located on private property adjacent to IUPUI, including the Indiana Avenue cultural district, Riley Hospital for Children, and the J. F. Miller Foundation. IUPUI also holds a collection of art works located indoors, including Dale Chihuly’s DNA Tower (2003).

== Campus ==
Public art is distributed throughout the 509-acre (206 ha) IUPUI campus. Sculptures are clustered near the Herron School of Art and Design, the School of Liberal Arts, and the University Library. Several were previously displayed at the White River State Park or the Indianapolis Museum of Art.

The campus is next to the Indiana Avenue cultural district, just west of downtown Indianapolis near the Indianapolis Zoo, the Downtown Canal Walk, and White River State Park.

A large collection of archival photographs of the campus is in the IUPUI Image Collection. Ralph D. Gray's book IUPUI—the Making of an Urban University (Bloomington: Indiana University Press, 2003) is a comprehensive account of the history of the campus.

== Significant works ==
James Wille Faust's The Herron Arch 1 in the IUPUI Public Art Collection

In 2009, the IUPUI Public Art Collection added four new sculptures lent by the Indianapolis Museum of Art: Sasson Soffer’s East Gate/West Gate (1973), Will Horwitt’s Spaces with Iron (1972), Shan Zou Zhou’s Portrait of History (1997), and John Francis Torreano’s Mega-Gem (1989).

Works by alumni, students and faculty are also included in the collection. For example, Don Gummer’s Reunion (1992), Casey Eskridge’s Torso Fragment (2005), Eric Nordgulen’s Antenna Man (1998), and Anatomy Vessel (Saplings) (2003–2005). Only two works by women artists are included in the permanent IUPUI Public Art Collection: Judith Shea’s Job (2005) and Jill Viney’s Barrow (2007–2008)

== Administration ==
Public art on campus is managed by the Curator of Campus Art through the Office of Risk Management at IU Bloomington. Each IU campus has a Campus Art Committee whose members work with the curator. A system-wide “Public Art Policy” was adopted in 1999 to govern work by the Curator of Campus Art and IUPUI Campus Art Committee. The Indiana University Board of Trustees regularly reviews and approves proposals to site public art works on campus.

== Documentation ==
The Curator of Campus Art maintains a computerized database of public art on campus, including acquisition and loan information and digital photographs. In addition, a Fall 2009 Museum Studies course at IUPUI undertook the project of researching and reporting on the condition of outdoor sculptures on campus. The IUPUI artworks were the first group to be documented through the WikiProject, Wikipedia Saves Public Art.

This effort was influenced by the successful Save Outdoor Sculpture! 1989 campaign organized by Heritage Preservation: The National Institute of Conservation partnered with the Smithsonian Institution, specifically the Smithsonian American Art Museum. Throughout the 1990s, over 7,000 volunteers nationwide cataloged and assessed the condition of over 30,000 publicly accessible statues, monuments, and sculptures installed as outdoor public art across the United States.

== List of works ==
Title	Artist	Year	Location/GPS Coordinates	Material	Dimensions	Owner
Anatomy Vessel (Saplings)	Eric Nordgulen	2005	No longer on view	Bronze		Indiana University – Purdue University Indianapoliss
Antenna Man	Eric Nordgulen	2008	Indiana University – Purdue University Indianapolis39°46.256′N 86°10.332′W	Aluminum	152 in.	Indiana University – Purdue University Indianapolis, Herron School of Art and Design
Barrow	Jill Viney	2008	Indiana University – Purdue University Indianapolis39°46.286′N 86°10.244′W	Fiberglass and metal meshing	8 ft., 8 ft. diameter	Indiana University – Purdue University Indianapolis
Broken Walrus I	Gary Freeman	1976	No longer on view	Mild steel	2 ft. 6 in. x 8 ft. x 2 ft.	Indiana University – Purdue University Indianapolis
Casey Stengel (sculpture)	Rhoda Sherbell	1965	No longer on view	Bronze	43 in.	Indiana University – Purdue University Indianapolis
DNA Tower	Dale Chihuly	2003	Indiana University – Purdue University Indianapolis, Medical Science Building	Glass, steel	20.2 ft.; 4.7 ft. diameter	Indiana University School of Medicine
East Gate/West Gate	Sasson Soffer	1973	Indiana University – Purdue University Indianapolis 39°46.438′N 86°10.299′W	Stainless Steel	24 ft × 30 ft × 40 ft	Indianapolis Museum of Art
Entangled	Brose Partington	2004	Indiana University – Purdue University Indianapolis 39°46.289′N 86°10.367′W	Steel	9 ft × 2 ft × 8 ft 2 in.	Indiana University – Purdue University Indianapolis, Herron School of Art and Design
Eve	Robert William Davidson	1932	Indiana University – Purdue University Indianapolis 39°46′23.04″N 86°10′29.28″W	Bronze	H. 5 ft. x Diam. 18 in.	Indiana University – Purdue University Indianapolis
Give and Take	Michael Smith	2005	Indiana University – Purdue University Indianapolis, Herron School of Art and Design39°46.296′N 86°10.379′W			Indiana University – Purdue University Indianapolis
The Herron Arch 1	James Wille Faust	2005	Indiana University – Purdue University Indianapolis 39°46.290′N 86°10.228′W	Aluminum	20 ft × 7 ft × 7 ft	Indiana University – Purdue University Indianapolis, Herron School of Art and Design
Indiana Limestone	Adolpho Doddoli	1976	Indiana University – Purdue University Indianapolis 39°46′23″N 86°10′29″W	Indiana limestone	2 ft. x 3 ft. x 1 ft. 4 in.	Indiana University – Purdue University Indianapolis
Job	Judith Shea	2005	Indiana University – Purdue University Indianapolis 39°46.264′N 86°10.296′W	Bronze	75 in × 38 in	Indiana University – Purdue University Indianapolis, Herron School of Art and Design
Luminary	Jeff Laramore	2008	Indiana University – Purdue University Indianapolis 39°46.480′N 86°10.543′W	Onyx, cement	4 ft × 5 ft × 41 ft	IU School of Medicine
Mega-Gem	John Torreano	1989	Indiana University – Purdue University Indianapolis 39°46.373′N 86°10.451′W	Aluminum	86 in × 132 in × 86 in	Indianapolis Museum of Art
Mother's Helper	Derek Chalfant		Indiana University – Purdue University Indianapolis 39°46.388′N 86°10.468′W	Stainless steel, steel, bronze	16 ft.	Indiana University – Purdue University Indianapolis
Open Eyes	Don Gummer	2011	Indiana University – Purdue University Indianapolis,	Steel, glass	16 ft tall	Eugene and Marilyn Glick Eye Institute
Peirce Geodetic Monument		1987	Indiana University – Purdue University Indianapolis 39°46.340′N 86°10.433′W	Brass, black granite	3 ft. tall, 1.5 ft. diameter	Indiana University – Purdue University Indianapolis
Portrait of History	Shan Zou Zhou, Zhou Brothers	1997	Indiana University – Purdue University Indianapolis 39°46.244′N 86°10.235′W	Bronze	8.3 ft × 2.5 ft × 2 ft	Indianapolis Museum of Art
Procession of Ants	David Bowen	1999	Indiana University – Purdue University Indianapolis 39°46.406′N 86°10.464′W	Steel	3.5 ft.	Indiana University – Purdue University Indianapolis
Punctuation Spire	William Crutchfield	1981	Indiana University – Purdue University Indianapolis	Wood, steel, aluminum	28h x 4w feet, 6 feet diameter, 3000 lbs.	Indiana University – Purdue University Indianapolis
Reunion	Don Gummer	1992	No longer on view	Cast bronze	100 in.	Indiana University – Purdue University Indianapolis
The South Tower	Don Gummer	1998	Indiana University – Purdue University Indianapolis	Stainless steel	10 ft × 2 ft × 3 ft	Don Gummer
Spaces with Iron	Will Horwitt	1972	Indiana University – Purdue University Indianapolis 39°46.381′N 86°10.218′W	Cast iron, bronze	4 ft 6 in × 7 ft × 5 ft 8.75 in	Indianapolis Museum of Art
Spirit Keeper	Steve Wooldridge	2007	Indiana University – Purdue University Indianapolis 39°46.915′N 86°9.997′W	Steel	6.5 ft × 3.2 ft × 3.2 ft	Indiana University – Purdue University Indianapolis
Temple VI	Austin Collins	1996	Indiana University – Purdue University Indianapolis 39°46.366′N 86°10.478′W	Steel	10.33 ft., 3.67 ft., 2.5 ft.	Indiana University – Purdue University Indianapolis
Torso Fragment	Casey Eskridge	2005	Indiana University – Purdue University Indianapolis 39°46.279′N 86°10.358′W	Aluminum	3.08 x 1.67 x 1.42 ft.	Indiana University – Purdue University Indianapolis, Herron School of Art and Design
Untitled (Bucket of Rocks)	Amber Lewis	2009	No longer on view	Mixed media	9 ft × 1.4 ft × 1.4 ft)	Indiana University – Purdue University Indianapolis
Untitled (Cary Chapman)	Cary Chapman	2001	Indiana University – Purdue University Indianapolis 39°46.357′N 86°10.373′W	Steel	192 in × 36 in × 52 in	Indiana University – Purdue University Indianapolis
Untitled (IUPUI Letters)	Two Twelve	2008	Indiana University – Purdue University Indianapolis 39°46.407′N 86°10.546′W	Stainless steel		Indiana University – Purdue University Indianapolis
Untitled (L's)	David Von Schlegell	1980	Indiana University – Purdue University Indianapolis 39°46.431′N 86°10.456′W	Stainless Steel & Landscaping	55 ft x 46 ft x 15 ft	Indiana University – Purdue University Indianapolis
Weather Tower	Jerald Jacquard	1985	Indiana University – Purdue University Indianapolis 39°46.416′N 086°11.106′W	Steel	20.5 ft × 6 ft × 7 ft	Indiana University – Purdue University Indianapolis
Wood Fountain	Singh Associates	1995	Indiana University – Purdue University Indianapolis 39°46.327′N 86°10.366′W	Stone	100 ft × 100 ft	Indiana University – Purdue University Indianapolis
Zephyr	Steve Wooldridge	1998	Indiana University – Purdue University Indianapolis 39°46.339′N 86°10.277′W	Stainless steel	13 ft × 10 ft × 2 ft	Indiana University – Purdue University Indianapolis

== See also ==
- Indiana Statehouse Public Art Collection
- Eskenazi Health Art Collection
