= Peirce Geodetic Monument =

Coordinates: 39°46.340′N 86°10.433′W

- Year: 1987
- Type: Brass, Black Granite.
- Dimensions: 91 cm (3 ft); 46 cm diameter (1.5 ft); 180 cm (6 ft) diameter grating
- Location: Indiana University-Purdue University Indianapolis; Indianapolis, Indiana, United States

The Peirce Geodetic Monument is a marker honoring the late American philosopher Charles Sanders Peirce (pronounced "purse"). It is located on Indiana University-Purdue University Indianapolis (IUPUI) campus in downtown Indianapolis, Indiana, and was installed by the National Oceanic and Atmospheric Administration and the U.S. National Geodetic Survey.

== Description ==
The Peirce Geodetic Monument is made of brass and black granite. It is cylindrical in shape, 3 feet (0.91 m) tall and 1.5 feet (0.46 m) diameter, with a top that tapers to a point topped with a metal disc. A metal grating 6 feet (1.8 m) in diameter surrounds the base in two sections.

A plaque commemorating Charles Sanders Peirce is included on the side of the monument. A second plaque is located on the concrete bench behind the monument and describes the sculpture's functionality as a geodetic marker. The monument's metal top piece includes inscriptions of the exact latitude, longitude, and altitude that is useful for map creators, architects, landscapers, engineers, and scientists. There are other markers by the Indianapolis government buildings, but the Peirce marker "will serve as a vertical and horizontal reference point".

== History ==
The National Oceanic and Atmospheric Administration and U.S. National Geodetic Survey donated and placed the marker on campus to honor Charles Sanders Peirce's contributions to multiple disciplines and IUPUI's work to compile his unpublished manuscripts. IUPUI's Peirce Edition Project has been ongoing since 1976. The IUPUI project is an attempt to publish Charles Sanders Peirce's hand-written manuscripts and put them in chronological order. As of April 2010, Volumes 1-6 and 8 of the anticipated thirty volumes have been published. The artist or manufacturer of the monument is unknown.

The IUPUI Peirce Monument is the National Oceanic and Atmospheric Administration's third marker to honor Peirce. While the location history is unknown the top of the marker is dated 1987 and it was installed June 30, 1987. It is currently located on "the southeast corner of the quadrangle bounded by the education/social work building, the lecture hall, and the old library".

A Museum Studies course at IUPUI recently undertook the project of researching and reporting on the condition of 40 outdoor sculptures on the university campus. Peirce Geodetic Monument was included in this movement. This documentation was influenced by the successful Save Outdoor Sculpture! 1989 campaign organized by Heritage Preservation: The National Institute of Conservation partnered with the Smithsonian Institution, specifically the Smithsonian American Art Museum. Throughout the 1990s, over 7,000 volunteers nationwide have cataloged and assessed the condition of over 30,000 publicly accessible statues, monuments, and sculptures installed as outdoor public art across the United States.

== See also ==
- Broken Walrus I
- Eve
- Mega-Gem
- Spaces with Iron
- Temple VI
- Torso Fragment
- Untitled (Faces)
- Untitled (L's)
- Zephyr
