= Give and take =

Give and take may refer to:

- Give and Take (Smith), a 2005 public artwork on the campus of Indiana University–Purdue University Indianapolis
- Give and Take (John Lindberg album), 1982
- Give and Take (Dynamic Superiors album), 1977
- Give and Take (Mike Stern album), 1997
- Give and Take (film), silent film, 1928
- "Give & Take" (Red Dwarf), episode of the TV series, 2016
- "Give & Take" (song), song by Netsky from the album 2, 2012
- Give-n-Take, American television game show, 1975
- Give and Take Live, album by Zonke, 2013
- Give and Take: A Revolutionary Approach to Success, book by Adam Grant, 2013
- Give and Take, album by British rock band Here & Now, 1982
- "Give and Take", song by Poor Man's Poison, 2023
- Give and Take a Christadelphian Sunday School Union magazine for Sunday School children
- Quid pro quo, a favor for a favor

== See also ==
- "Givers and Takers", song by S-K-O, 1988
- Giver Taker, album by Anjimile, 2020
- Give or take
