= Mega-Gem =

Sculpture in Indianapolis, Indiana

- Artist: John Francis Torreano
- Year: 1989
- Type: Aluminum
- Dimensions: 220 cm × 340 cm × 220 cm (86 in × 132 in × 86 in)
- Location: Indiana University-Purdue University Indianapolis; Indianapolis, Indiana, United States; 39°46′22″N 86°10′27″W
- Owner: Indianapolis Museum of Art

Mega-Gem is an outdoor sculpture by American artist John Francis Torreano (born 1941). It is located on the Indiana University-Purdue University Indianapolis (IUPUI) campus, which is near downtown Indianapolis, Indiana, and is owned by the Indianapolis Museum of Art. The oversized sculpture, made of aluminum, is shaped like a round-cut diamond resting on one its facets and studded with 36 smaller, colored-metal rosettes.

== Description ==
Mega-Gem is an oversized, metallic, diamond-shaped sculpture that is tilted at an angle and composed with eighteen facets (or plates). Randomly scattered on each plate are from one to three metal rosette gems of varying colors. There are a total of 36 rosettes (six blue, six green, two red-orange, six red, eight gold, five silver and three black), all of which are made of anodized or painted cast aluminum. The main body of Mega-Gem is gray Heliarch welded aluminum plate. The sculpture measures 7'2" × 11' × 7'2" and sits on a concrete base that measures 2" × 11'. It weighs approximately 2,000 lb (910 kg).

== Historical information ==
Mega-Gem was fabricated in 1989 with the resources of Cincinnati art dealer Carl Solway. It was presented at the Chicago International Art Exposition, where it was located on the Navy Pier in Chicago, Illinois. The presentation of Mega-Gem was promoted through posters and buttons proclaiming the sculpture to be the largest diamond in the world, weighing over 360 million carats. Mega-Gem was considered by Torreano to be one of a series of "oxy-gem" sculptures, playing on the oxymoron of combining precious gems with materials of lesser value, such as a "plywood gem", "gold gem", and Mega-Gem as "aluminum gem". Mega-Gem is one of Torreano's oversized and exaggerated jewel sculptures.

=== Location history ===
In 1989 Mega-Gem was presented at the Chicago International Art Exposition where it was displayed on Navy Pier along Lake Michigan in Chicago, Illinois, until 1994.

In October 1994 Mega-Gem was loaned to the Indianapolis Museum of Art for two years. It arrived on October 10, 1994, and was put on display in the southwest corner of Krannert Plaza, which is a section of the IMA's grounds and gardens located on the west side of the property overlooking the White River. In 1997, after the loan period had expired, the Contemporary Art Society raised funds for Mega-Gem to be acquired by the IMA. It remained on view in Krannert Plaza until 2001, when it was relocated to the southeast corner of the IMA property near the intersection of 38th Street and Michigan Road.

In late January 2009 Mega-Gem was relocated to the IUPUI campus to make way for the creation of the IMA's Virginia B. Fairbanks Art & Nature Park, which opened in June 2010. Mega-Gem was one of four IMA sculptures that were loaned to IUPUI. The others were East Gate/West Gate by Sasson Soffer, Portrait of History by Shan Zou Zhou, and Spaces with Iron by Will Horwitt. These four IMA pieces on the IUPUI campus are part of the Indianapolis Cultural Trail, which "connects neighborhoods, entertainment facilities and the city's five cultural districts" and includes Indiana Avenue, Massachusetts Avenue, Indianapolis, Fountain Square, Indianapolis, the Wholesale District, Indianapolis, and White River State Park. The Cultural Trail, completed in 2013 as a bike and pedestrian path, will connect Broad Ripple Village, Indianapolis to downtown Indianapolis via the Monon Trail.

Mega-Gem is situated in the courtyard north of New York Street on the IUPUI campus, east of Lecture Hall and south of Joseph T. Taylor Hall (formerly University College), at 815 W. Michigan Street.

=== Acquisition ===
Mega-Gem was loaned to the Indianapolis Museum of Art (IMA) by the Carl Solway Gallery from 1994 to 1996. In 1997 the IMA Contemporary Art Society (CAS) undertook the effort to purchase the sculpture and acquire it for the IMA. CAS President Dee Garrett led the fund drive for Mega-Gem and worked with the IMA to sell miniature gem sculptures created by Torreano in order to raise money. The CAS donated Mega-Gem to the IMA at a gala in 1997 with John Torreano in attendance.

Mega-Gem was acquired by the IMA in 1997 with the accession number of 1997.6. It is credited as the Gift of Robert Shiffler, Contemporary Art Society Fund and Henry F. and Katherine D. DeBoest Memorial Fund. The value of Mega-Gem is unknown; however, prices for Torreano's work have ranged from $4,000 for smaller paintings to $30,000 for larger pieces.

== Condition ==
The fading paint on the rosettes has been a cause for concern in the past. In 1996, in preparation for Mega-Gem's acquisition into the Indianapolis Museum of Art collection, the rosettes were returned to the artist for repainting.

== See also ==
- The Herron Arch 1
- Torso Fragment
