= Stengle =

Stengle is a surname. Notable people with the surname include:

- Charles I. Stengle (1869–1953), American politician
- Tyson Stengle (born 1998), Australian rules footballer

== See also ==
- Stengel
