= The Herron Arch 1 =

Public artwork by James Wille Faust

- Artist: James Wille Faust
- Year: 2005
- Type: Aluminum
- Dimensions: 6.1 m × 2.1 m × 2.1 m (20 ft × 7 ft × 7 ft)
- Location: Indiana University-Purdue University Indianapolis; Indianapolis, Indiana, United States; 39°46′17.21″N 86°10′13.53″W
- Owner: Herron School of Art and Design

The Herron Arch 1, a public sculpture by American artist James Wille Faust, is located on the Indiana University-Purdue University Indianapolis campus, which is near downtown Indianapolis, Indiana. The sculpture is located at the corner of New York and Blackford Streets, the north-east corner of the Herron School of Art and Design. Faust, an alumnus of Herron, created the 20-foot-tall (6.1 m), vividly colored aluminum sculpture for Herron's eighteen-month-long Public Sculpture Invitational.

Installed on May 2, 2005, The Herron Arch 1 as well as fourteen additional sculptures included in the invitational, was part of the public grand opening of the Herron School of Art and Design's new home on the IUPUI campus.

== Description ==
Over thirty geometrically shaped pieces of painted aluminum make up The Herron Arch 1. This 20-foot-tall (6.1 m) sculpture is vividly painted using an airbrush technique. From the proper front and proper back of the sculpture, the viewer sees a predominantly black and white structure. However, from the proper left and proper right of the sculpture, the viewer sees a wide variety of vivid colors. The sculpture is painted in a geometric pattern on all sides. There is a stylized signature and date near the base of the structure on the proper left side. The square-shaped foot of the sculpture sits on a 5-foot-square (1.5 m) concrete base, and features a black and white geometric pattern which matches the overall aesthetic of the artwork. A large flood light is mounted flush with the concrete base on all four sides of the sculpture. There is a weather-damaged bronze plaque attached to the east corner of the base which lists the artist, title, and date of the sculpture.

== Information ==
The Herron Arch 1 was the first large scale sculpture created by James Wille Faust, one of the Herron School of Art and Design's most notable alumni. In an effort to raise funds to name a drawing studio after Faust, the Herron School of Art and Design held an exhibition of Faust's work. Included in this exhibition were maquettes of potential large scale sculpture, including The Herron Arch 1. The Dean of Herron School of Art and Design, Valerie Eickmeier, noticed this particular maquette during the exhibition. In an effort to fulfill Faust's wish of creating a large scale sculpture, she suggested commissioning the piece for the upcoming Public Sculpture Invitational. Through grants and fund raising, as well as the generous donation of time by the artist, the $115,000 sculpture was created and now serves as the signature piece of artwork of the Herron School of Art and Design.

The Herron Arch 1 was one of fifteen sculptures placed on the grounds of the new Herron School of Art and Design during the first ever Public Sculpture Invitational. The invitational lasted eighteen months, and initially, this piece was the only permanent sculpture of the group. Since the removal of the invitational works, three others have become permanent fixtures on the Herron grounds: Anatomy Vessels by Eric Nordgulen, Torso Fragment by Casey Eskridge, and Job by Judith Shea.

The Herron Arch 1 was commissioned by the Herron School of Art and Design to stand on the north-east corner of the school's property. This is the south west corner of the New York Street and Blackford Street intersection. Since its initial installation, the sculpture has not been moved, and is visible online via Google Street View.

== Artist ==
James Wille Faust, an Indianapolis resident, was born in 1949 in Lapel, Indiana. He earned a Bachelor of Fine Arts in sculpture from the Herron School of Art and Design in 1971 and a Master of Fine Arts in painting from the University of Illinois in 1974.

Faust's vivid paintings have earned him praise throughout his career. His use of the airbrush is both unique and captivating.

In the end I'm making stuff. That's what I do.

— James Wille Faust, February 1970

In 1992, Faust received national recognition when his work was included in the Absolut Art Collection sponsored by Absolut Vodka. For the award-winning "Absolut Statehood" campaign, Faust created "Absolut Indiana" in an effort to capture the spirit of the state. Faust also served on the NASA Art Team for the "Mission to Planet Earth" project from 1992 to 1993.

== See also ==
- Broken Walrus I
- Entangled
- Orange Curves
- Temple VI
- Weather Tower
