= Anatomy Vessels (Saplings) =

Anatomy Vessel (Saplings)
- Artist: Eric Nordgulen
- Year: 2003–2005
- Type: Bronze
- Dimensions: 110 cm × 28 cm (44 in × 11 in); 48 cm diameter (19 in)
- Location: Indianapolis, Indiana, United States; 39°46.289′N 86°10.273′W
- Owner: Indiana University-Purdue University Indianapolis

Anatomy Vessels (Saplings), 2003–05, is a public sculpture created by Indiana-based artist Eric Nordgulen (American born 1959), Associate Professor of Sculpture at Herron School of Art and Design. The sculpture is located on the Indiana University-Purdue University Indianapolis (IUPUI) campus at the Herron School of Art and Design, 735 W. New York Street in Indianapolis, Indiana in the United States. It was selected in 2005 for the Herron Gallery first Sculpture Biennial Invitational to be exhibited in the Herron Sculpture Gardens. The two-part cast and fabricated bronze sculpture represents two life size sapling trees with bound root balls.

== Description ==
The two-part cast and fabricated bronze sculpture represents two life size sapling trees with bound root balls left for planting. The horizontal element (part A) measures 44” x 11’ with a 19” diameter base. The vertical element (part B) measures 75” x 21” with a 16” diameter base. “The lack of a formal base allow for the objects to appear more temporary or transformation. As if they had been left there by a landscaper rather than an artist,” stated Nordgulen. "The perception of sculpture is a physical experience that can become a catalyst for new thoughts and ideas."

It was selected for exhibition for the Herron Gallery First Sculpture Invitational in 2005 showcasing the work of 15 artists, each represented by a single work. Participating artists include Katrin Asbury, David Bellamy, Barbara Cooper, Wim Delvoye, Casey Eskridge, James Wille Faust, Don Gummer, Greg Hull, Edward Mayer, Arny Nadler, Eric Nordgulen, Tom Otterness, John Ruppert, Tom Sachs and Judith Shea. It is now on extended loan from the artist to the Herron Sculpture Gardens.

== Artist ==
Professor Nordgulen was appointed to the Herron School of Art and Design sculpture faculty in 1993, and was the Fine Arts Department chairman from 2005 to 2007. Before joining Herron, he was a professor and lecturer at Washington University in St. Louis. Nordgulen is a sculptor and educator who considers his work as a means to explore one's relationship to his or her surroundings. "I use my work to generate physical questions that allow one to rethink their position based on what they see and what they know." The artist earned his Bachelor of Fine Arts from East Carolina University in Greenville, North Carolina in 1982 and his Master of Fine Arts from Indiana University (Bloomington) in 1985. He is a prolific artist with public sculpture installations at Milwaukee Riverwalk, University of Cincinnati, Raymond Walters College, Cincinnati, OH, Illinois Institute of Technology, Chicago, IL, Indianapolis Museum of Art, Arts in Transit, St. Louis, MO, and Piedmont Park, Atlanta Arts Festival, Atlanta, GA.

Nordgulen is the recipient of several grants and commissions related to public art. In 1995 the artist was awarded the Mass Attraction commission from the Riley Area Development Corporation for the installation of Viewfinders. Riley Area Development is a Community Development Corporation formed to revitalize the historic Mass Ave Cultural District in downtown Indianapolis. In 2004 Nordgulen was awarded a $20,000 Efroymson Contemporary Arts Fellowship from the Efroymson Family Fund.

== Location ==
The sculpture is on extended loan from the artist and located outside the north entrance to Eskenazi Hall on the Indiana University-Purdue University Indianapolis (IUPUI) campus at 735 W. New York Street in Indianapolis, Indiana in the United States. It is part of a larger series of Anatomy Vessel works by the artist referencing nature but not intended to be functional, including "Anatomy Vessel" on the Raymond Walters College campus and "Anatomy Vessel" on the University of Indianapolis campus.

== Documentation ==
A Museum Studies course at IUPUI recently undertook the project of researching and reporting on the condition of 40 outdoor sculptures on the university campus. Anatomy Vessels (Saplings) was included in this movement. This documentation was influenced by the successful Save Outdoor Sculpture! 1989 campaign organized by Heritage Preservation: The National Institute of Conservation partnered with the Smithsonian Institution, specifically the Smithsonian American Art Museum. Throughout the 1990s, over 7,000 volunteers nationwide have cataloged and assessed the condition of over 30,000 publicly accessible statues, monuments, and sculptures installed as outdoor public art across the United States.
