= Open Eyes =

- Artist: Don Gummer
- Year: 2011
- Type: Steel
- Dimensions: 490 cm (16 ft)
- Location: Indiana University-Purdue University Indianapolis; Indianapolis, Indiana, United States; 39.775027°N 86.180003°W
- Owner: Don Gummer

Open Eyes is an outdoor sculpture by American artist Don Gummer (born 1946). It is located on the Indiana University-Purdue University Indianapolis (IUPUI) campus, which is near downtown Indianapolis, Indiana, and is owned by the Eugene and Marilyn Glick Eye Institute. The 16' tall sculpture of cascading circular shapes with a colored glass center, is meant to show the range of colors that the human pupil can interpret.

== Description ==
Open Eyes is a 16 foot tall outdoor sculpture made of stainless steel and colored glass. Nine interlocking oval discs of stainless steel with colored glass centers intersect with each other, cascading downward supported by three curved steel elements.

The sculpture rests on a square piece of stainless steel that rests upon a square concrete base within a circular concrete pad. There is a metal plaque attached to the base that reads “Open Eyes by Don Gummer” attached at the front of the sculpture. There are 4 small adjustable spotlights on each side of the piece that illuminate the sculpture at night.

== Historical information ==
Open Eyes was commissioned by the Eugene and Marilyn Glick Eye Institute. It was installed in the courtyard of the Institute on August 12, 2011.

== See also ==
- The South Tower
- Punctuation Spire
