= Stengel =

Stengel is a surname. Notable people with the surname include:

- Alfred Stengel (1868–1939), American surgeon
- Casey Stengel (1890–1975), American baseball player and manager
- Christian Stengel (1903–1986), French film director
- Erwin Stengel (1902–1973), Austrian-British neurologist, psychiatrist, and psychoanalyst
- Friedrich Joachim Stengel (1694–1787), German architect
- Henri Christian Michel de Stengel (1744–1796), General in the French Revolutionary Wars
- Hermann von Stengel (1837–1919), Bavarian administrator, German politician
- Isaiah Stengel, birth name of Isaiah Shachar, Israeli historian
- Kilien Stengel (born 1972), French gastronomic author and teacher
- Lawrence F. Stengel (born 1952), American jurist
- Richard Stengel (born 1955), American editor
- Werner Stengel (born 1936), German roller coaster designer and engineer

== See also ==
- Casey Stengel (Sherbell) a public sculpture by American artist, Rhoda Sherbell
- Stangl
- Stengl
- Tsengel (disambiguation)
