= Job (Shea) =

Sculpture by Judith Shea

- Artist: Judith Shea
- Year: 2005
- Type: Bronze
- Dimensions: 190 cm × 97 cm (75 in × 38 in)
- Location: Indiana University-Purdue University Indianapolis; Indianapolis, Indiana, United States; 39°46.277′N 86°10.291′W
- Owner: Herron School of Art and Design

Job is a bronze sculpture, created by American artist Judith Shea. It is located on the Indiana University-Purdue University Indianapolis (IUPUI) campus in Indianapolis, Indiana. The piece was created in 2005 and placed on loan at Herron School of Art and Design for the school's first Public Sculpture Invitational, held between May 2005 and August 2006. In 2008, Herron acquired Job, with financial support from Jane Fortune, Dr. Robert Hesse, William Fortune Jr., and Joseph Blakley.

== Description ==
Job is a single standing bronze figure placed at the Allen Whitehill Clowes Pavilion main entrance of Herron School of Art and Design, near New York Street. Job portrays a bald man looking upward while wearing a long open overcoat. The figure is shirtless with his palms facing outward. The figure likely represents the biblical character Job, the central character of the Book of Job in the Hebrew Bible, as well as a prophet in Islam. The sculpture measures 75” X 38” X 30”.

=== Acquisition ===
In 2007 Job was removed from the grounds of Herron School of Art & Design, since it had only been on temporary loan. However, by 2008 sufficient financial donations had been obtained (from Jane Fortune, Dr. Robert Hesse, William Fortune Jr. and Joseph Blakley), to permanently obtain the piece, and it was re-installed at Herron.

== Artist ==
Judith Shea was born in 1948. Her work has been displayed at the Whitney Biennial, and she has pieces at the Whitney Museum of American Art, Metropolitan Museum of Art, Brooklyn Museum, and the National Gallery. She has received several awards, including the Rome Prize Fellowship, the Saint-Gaudens Fellowship, and two NEA fellowships for Sculpture.
