= Stengl =

Stengl is a surname. Notable people with the surname include:

- Anne Elisabeth Stengl (born 1950), American children's author
- Manfred Stengl (1946–1992), Austrian luger
- Vladimir Štengl (born 1942), Croatian politician

== See also ==
- Stengel
