= Spaces with Iron =

Artwork by Will Horwitt

- Artist: Will Horwitt
- Year: 1972
- Type: Cast iron and bronze
- Dimensions: 137 cm × 210 cm × 174.63 cm (4 ft 6 in × 7 ft × 5 ft 8.75 in)
- Location: IUPUI; Indianapolis, Indiana, United States; 39°46.381′N 86°10.218′W

Spaces with Iron is a public sculpture by American artist Will Horwitt. It was installed in January 2009 on the Indiana University-Purdue University Indianapolis (IUPUI) campus, near downtown Indianapolis, Indiana. The sculpture is located at the corner of Blackford and Vermont Streets, on the southeast lawn of the Science Building, and is on long-term loan from the Indianapolis Museum of Art.

== Description ==
Spaces with Iron, created in 1972, is made of cast iron and bronze. It measures 54 inches (1.4 m) high, 84 inches (2.1 m) wide, and 68.75 inches (1.746 m) long. The work consists of two open rectangular pieces. One elongated rectangle is cast in bronze; the other piece, almost square, is cast iron. The cast-iron rectangle is taller than the bronze piece, but the bronze piece is wider. Both forms sit upright, parallel to each other, and are connected with an iron piece resting across the bottom of each piece. The sculpture sits on a cylindrical-shaped concrete base. A bronze rectangular cuboid rests on each rectangular piece on the sculpture's proper left side. The edges of both cuboids extend beyond the sides of the rectangular pieces.

Spaces with Iron "draws attention to the negative spaces created by the sculpture's openings as well as the environment in which it resides."

=== Acquisition ===
The Indianapolis Museum of Art acquired Spaces with Iron in 1981 through the Helen Benjamin Fund and assigned it accession number 81.220.

== Artist ==
New York City artist Will Horwitt was a modernist sculptor who was born in 1934 and spent his adolescence in Stockbridge, Massachusetts. From 1952 to 1954 he studied at the Art Institute of Chicago. In 1965 he received the Guggenheim Fellowship for creative sculpture. Three years later he was awarded the Tiffany Purchase Grant. New York Times art critic Art Canaday commends Horwitt as "a most gratifying workman...The simplified subtly warped forms in expressive balances are consistently mindful of Brancusi, but that is a good point of departure. Mr. Horwitt comes through as one of the strongest young sculptures around."

Horwitt's works appear in many public and private collections, including those of Nelson Rockefeller, Vera and Albert List, and Helen and Robert Benjamin. His sculptures are featured in the Yale University Art Gallery, the Solomon R. Guggenheim Museum, the Wadsworth Atheneum, the Albright-Knox Art Gallery, the Neuberger Museum of Art, the Governor Nelson A. Rockefeller Empire State Plaza Art Collection in Albany, NY, and at IUPUI.

Horwitt's works are strongly rooted in geometric forms. His minimalist pieces have been favorably viewed by many critics throughout his career. Horwitt "reflects [on] the dominance of a certain preoccupation with the language of the space and lines that express the evocative forms of both his drawings and sculptures." According to Al Brunelle, writer for Art in America, Horwitt's pieces are, "expressive...they transmit a feeling that is vital and concrete like everyday life experience." His last exhibition was at the Vanderwoude Tananbaum Gallery in New York City. He died of lymphoma in 1985 in New York City at the age of fifty one.

== Location ==
Spaces with Iron was acquired by Newfields (formerly the Indianapolis Museum of Art) in 1981. In 1985 it was moved from the southwest corner of the sculpture court to the north of Newfields’ Krannert Pavilion. The sculpture was moved again in 1990 to Newfield's southeastern lawn by the parking lot, to either the north or west side. In late January 2009 it was removed from the Newfields grounds and installed on the IUPUI campus, at the corner of Blackford and Vermont Streets on the southeast lawn of the Science Building.

Spaces with Iron is one of four pieces on long-term loan to IUPUI from the Indianapolis Museum of Art. The others are Portrait of History, Mega-Gem, and East Gate/West Gate. Three pieces were transported to IUPUI in January 2009; however, due to its size, East Gate/West Gate was flown by helicopter to campus in March 2009. These pieces and other public art are installed along a portion of the Indianapolis Cultural Trail, a bikeway and pedestrian path that "connects neighborhoods, entertainment facilities and the city's five cultural districts": Indiana Avenue, Massachusetts Avenue, Fountain Square, the Wholesale District, and White River State Park. The Cultural Trail, completed in 2013, connects downtown Indianapolis to Broad Ripple Village via the Monon Trail.
