= Tsengel =

Tsengel (Chinese: 臣格勒) may refer to several places:

- Tsengel, Bayan-Ölgii, a sum (district) of Bayan-Ölgii Province in western Mongolia
- Tsengel Khairkhan, a mountain of the Altai Mountains in western Mongolia

== See also ==
- Stengel, a surname
