= Give or take =

Give or take may mean:

- Give or Take symbol, plus–minus sign
- Give or Take (album), album by Giveon, 2022
- Give or Take (film), directed by Paul Riccio, 2022

== See also ==
- "Give or Take a Million", an episode of the television series Thunderbirds, 1966
- Give and take
