= Punctuation Spire =

Sculpture by William Crutchfield

Coordinates: 39°46′26.3″N 86°10′33.3″W

- Artist: William Crutchfield
- Year: 1981
- Type: Wood, steel, aluminum
- Dimensions: 850 cm × 120 cm (28 ft × 4 ft); 180 cm diameter (6 ft)
- Location: Indiana University-Purdue University Indianapolis; Indianapolis, Indiana, United States
- Owner: Indiana University-Purdue University Indianapolis

Punctuation Spire is a sculpture by American artist William Crutchfield that is installed in Campus Center on the Indiana University-Purdue University Indianapolis (IUPUI) campus, which is near downtown Indianapolis, Indiana, and is owned by the university.

== Description ==
Punctuation Spire is a 28-foot-tall, 4-foot-wide wooden sculpture supported internally by aluminum and steel materials. The four sections of the column are designed with punctuation marks in a font of the artist’s making. The sculpture was finished with Deft Clear Wood Finish as a sealer, then a layer of Deft Clear Wood Finish (Gloss) and then 2 coats of Deft Clear Wood Finish (Semi-Gloss).

- Section one is a question mark;
- Section two is a set of parentheses that enclose a forward slash and a semicolon, with an em dash on top;
- Section three is an asterisk with brackets that enclose a colon;
- Section four is a set of quotation marks with an exclamation point and a period on top.

== Historical information ==
Punctuation Spire was originally commissioned in 1981 by A. Alfred Taubman for the Beverly Center, an eight-story shopping mall in Los Angeles, California. It was later gifted to Herron School of Art and Design. The sculpture was initially intended to be displayed in the foyer of Eskenazi Hall, but it was found to be too tall for the space. It was then placed in storage until the completion of the IUPUI Campus Center, which provided a more spacious area for the 28-foot tall work. In July 2010, Punctuation Spire was installed in its current location within the foyer of the Campus Center, near its eastern entrance off of University Boulevard.

Punctuation Spire represents the English language and its importance throughout the development of civilization. The work is one in a series of four monumental works including Alphabet Spire, Countdown, and Wish. Alphabet Spire VI is located in Westfarms Mall, Farmington, Connecticut. The work, composed of the letters A to Z, was the first created in the series, and is 32 feet tall. It was installed in the mall at its grand opening in October 1974. Countdown, located in Short Hills Mall, Short Hills, New Jersey, is made up of the numbers zero through nine and serves as a tribute to Apollo 11, the mission which took the first humans to the moon. Wish, located in Marley Station Mall, Glen Burnie, Maryland, is the most recent and is the first of the series to assemble a word.

Crutchfield has said of his works, “These four sculptures are the only ones I know of that deal with all the symbols of our modern written language. William Shakespeare's plays and poems had done the groundwork. I hope that these four sculptures will remain as monuments to one of the greatest achievements of mankind, English language.”

== Artist ==
William Crutchfield was born in Indianapolis where he earned his B.F.A. in painting from the Herron School of Art and Design in 1956. He received his M.F.A. from Tulane University and later returned to Herron to teach foundation studies and advanced drawing from 1962-1965. A former Fulbright Scholar, Crutchfield is an internationally known artist working in a variety of mediums, from drawings, paintings, and lithographs to monumental sculpture. He has been featured in exhibitions around the world, with works in collections such as the Museum of Modern Art, New York; the Indianapolis Museum of Art, Indianapolis; the Los Angeles County Museum of Art; and the Tate, London.
Former Dean Valerie Eickmeier, Herron School of Art and Design, has said of the artist:
“William Crutchfield has a whimsical and satirical approach to art that is at once humorous and thought provoking. The body of his work emphasizes trains, ships, aircraft and other things mechanical, yet there are many quirky figures, animals and other tangents on display throughout the decades. The range of scale and mediums he uses—from small notepad line drawings to six-foot watercolors to 28-foot tall wooden sculptures—qualify him as true multi-media artists.”
Crutchfield has said of his work:
“One of the most important things about my work is imagination. Everything in the composition is necessary, and it’s alive. I draw a complete idea (hopefully). Every dot, every line is in the right place. And that’s something I think about. The finished work should have multiple levels of expression. I think drawing is the root of everything including sculpture and after you’ve drawn for so many years, you just think that way.”

Crutchfield died April 20, 2015, in his home in California.

== See also ==
- The Herron Arch 1
- Torso Fragment
