= Post-Balzac =

- Artist: Judith Shea
- Year: 1991
- Medium: Bronze
- 38.888333°N 77.023056°W

Post-Balzac is a bronze sculpture by Judith Shea created in 1991 in an edition of three copies.

It was exhibited at the White House, and the John and Mary Pappajohn Sculpture Park.

== See also ==
- List of public art in Washington, D.C., Ward 2
