= Reunion (Gummer) =

Public sculpture

- Artist: Don Gummer
- Year: 1992
- Type: Bronze
- Dimensions: 640 cm (253 in)
- Location: Indianapolis, Indiana, United States; 39°46.260′N 86°10.219′W
- Owner: Indiana University-Purdue University Indianapolis

Reunion, a public sculpture by Don Gummer, is located on the Indiana University-Purdue University Indianapolis campus, located near downtown Indianapolis, Indiana. The sculpture consists of two interlocking metal forms that have separate bases that eventually unite with one another. Reunion is located on the east side of the Herron School of Art and Design and is approximately 253 cm in height and approximately 167 cm wide. Reunion was created in 1992 as a model for a larger Reunion sculpture located in Japan. Reunion is made from cast bronze.

== Description ==
Reunion by Don Gummer consists of two metal interlocking pieces that start with separate bases. Reunion is made out of cast bronze and sits on a cement circular base. The metal forms are approximately 253 cm in height and 167 cm in width. The cement circular base is approximately a 244 cm wide circle. Reunion is accompanied by an information plaque that sits on the cement base and is located in the proper front of the sculpture. The plaque simply states the title Reunion and the date 1992.

== Information ==
Reunion was originally made out of foam core and balsa wood and was cast in Bronze. Gummer makes many of his sculptures out of cardboard, foam core and or wood. The sculptures are then sent to a foundry to be cast in metal. This particular sculpture was also cast in Bronze and stainless steel for a permanent installation at the Kitakyushu International Center, located in Kitakyushu, Japan. The Kitakyushu Reunion is double the size of the Reunion sculpture currently located on the IUPUI campus. The Reunion sculpture located in Japan was cast in 1993 and the Reunion sculpture located outside of the Herron School of Art was cast in 1992.

== Artist ==
Don Gummer was born in Louisville, Kentucky on December 12, 1946. Don Gummer attended Herron School of Art in 1964 through 1966, prior to attending School of the Museum of Fine Arts, located in Boston Massachusetts. Don also attended Yale University, located in New Haven, Connecticut, where he received his BFA and MFA. Herron recently honored Gummer with an honoree degree. Don Gummer currently lives in New York with his wife and children. Gummer is married to actress Meryl Streep.

In the book titled The Lyrical Constructivist: Don Gummer Sculpture; he gives this statement in 2001 about his artwork:

The fundamental basis of my sculpture must rest on solid ground, in real life. Gravity, space and time are the three elements that exclusively fill natural reality. I want my work to embrace reality; therefore it must be physically based on these three elements. The aim of my work is to identify and display creative life through an intuitive manipulation of structure (gravity), shape (space), and movement (time). I begin with the assumption that I can make a sculpture that isolates the movement when natural reality and human emotion unite to form spiritual recognition. The art is in guiding the process from its hopeful beginning to physical completion without compromising the sculpture's true nature.

— The Lyrical Constructivist: Don Gummer Sculpture, 2001.

== Location history ==
Reunion is currently located outside on the east side of the Herron School of Art building. Originally, Reunion was located outside of the Indiana State Museum, when the Museum was located at 202 N. Alabama Street, Indianapolis, Indiana. The sculpture then moved to the original location Herron School of Art, which was located 16th Street and Pennsylvania Street in Indianapolis, Indiana. Reunion was then moved to Herron's current location, which is 735 W. New York Street Indianapolis, Indiana.
