= Untitled (IUPUI Letters) =

Coordinates: 39°46.407′N 086°10.546′W

IUPUI Letters
- Artist: Two Twelve
- Year: 2008
- Type: Stainless Steel; Height: 7'5"; Length: 3'5"; Width: 11.5" (I), 26.125" (U), and 25" (P)
- Dimensions: 226 cm (89 in)
- Location: Indiana University-Purdue University Indianapolis; Indianapolis, Indiana, United States

Untitled (IUPUI Letters), a public sculpture, was designed by the New York City firm Two Twelve and is located on the Indiana University-Purdue University Indianapolis campus near downtown Indianapolis, Indiana. The sculpture can be viewed at the entrance of the IUPUI Campus Center, at the north-west corner of Vermont Street and University Boulevard.

This sculpture consists of five letters. Each of the letters has a height of 7 feet 5 inches and a length of 3 feet 5 inches. The width of each sculpture varies by letter. Widths are the following for each of the letters represented in the sculpture: "I" is 11.5 inches, "U" is 26.125 inches, and the "P" is 25 inches. The fabricator of the letters was ASI Modulex of Indianapolis. They built the sculptures in May 2008 and installed them in June of the same year.

== Description ==
Untitled (IUPUI Letters) consists of a group of five letters spelling out IUPUI, the acronym for Indiana University-Purdue University Indianapolis. The five sculpture pieces have been installed at an angle from one another with several feet between each letter. The sculpture can be viewed as individual letters of the alphabet or together as one large group. The letter enclosures sit perpendicular to the full cabinets, giving each letter a multidimensional appearance.

The sculptures are constructed from 10 gauge steel frames and 16 gauge stainless steel sheets. The letter-forms have been designed using Impact (typeface) and painted with Pantone finish color, PMS 201C Red.

The stainless steel cabinet surrounding of each letter is made from thin gauge stainless steel fascia panels with a non-directional brushed finish. These panels provide a "dimple" like protective coating and are attached with a hi-bond adhesive to the frame structure. The frame structure is a 2" x 6" section welded together. The thin gauge painted steel "letter forms" are welded to the monolithic frame. A steel leveling plate was used to mount each letter into a 46” x 18” x ¼” base plate configuration using gussets, vinyl tape, and silicone. The leveling plate is attached to a concrete footer. Each of the five of the letters are 7.5 feet in height, 3.5 feet in length, with the main steel cabinet having a depth of 5.875 inches. If all five sculptures were placed side by side the length would total 17.5 feet.

== Information ==
Untitled (IUPUI Letters) was designed as part of the signage package to go with the original construction of IUPUI's Campus Center. September 30, 2005 marked the ground breaking for the $50 million Campus Center. The New York design firm, Two Twelve, designed the metal letters to be used as a wayfinding tool to attract visitors to the IUPUI campus and to help people find the IUPUI Campus Center after the building opened in April 2008. The construction intent document was submitted to the Senior Associate University Architect and Director of IUPUI Project Development in June 2004 and the final bid document was issued in June 2006.

The fabricator of the letters was ASI Modulex of Indianapolis. They submitted fabricator shop drawings to the University in September and October 2007. ASI then fabricated and installed the sculpture in May and June 2008.

== Artist ==
The piece was designed by Two Twelve a graphic design firm out of New York City. This graphic design firm seeks sustainable solutions to problems of wayfinding, information, and visioning. They have practiced a communications discipline called “public information design” since 1980.

The Principle-in-Charge of the design team was a trained architect called David Gibson. Gibson, author of The Wayfinding Handbook: Information Design for Public Places has a philosophy to "discover the hidden logic within each design project, the secret structure of a confusing campus, the undisclosed order in a complex body of information, the unknown essence of a new identity.”

== Documentation ==
A Museum Studies course at IUPUI recently undertook the project of researching and reporting on the condition of 40 outdoor sculptures on the university campus. IUPUI Letters was included in this movement. This documentation was influenced by the successful Save Outdoor Sculpture! 1989 campaign organized by Heritage Preservation: The National Institute of Conservation partnered with the Smithsonian Institution, specifically the Smithsonian American Art Museum. Throughout the 1990s, over 7,000 volunteers nationwide have cataloged and assessed the condition of over 30,000 publicly accessible statues, monuments, and sculptures installed as outdoor public art across the United States.
