= Mother's Helper (Chalfant) =

- Artist: Derek Chalfant
- Type: Stainless steel, steel, bronze
- Dimensions: 490 cm × 91 cm × 240 cm (16 ft × 3 ft × 8 ft)
- Location: Indianapolis, Indiana, United States; 39°46.388′N 86°10.467′W
- Owner: Indiana University-Purdue University Indianapolis

Mother's Helper is a public sculpture by American artist Derek Chalfant located on the Indiana University – Purdue University Indianapolis (IUPUI) campus near downtown Indianapolis, Indiana. The piece is located in a small alcove near the ramp to the west entrance of the Joseph T. Taylor Hall (formerly the University College building) at 815 W. Michigan Street.

Mother's Helper is a 16'-tall stainless steel highchair. The rockers on the highchair straddle a large stainless steel Latin cross. A bronze infant and dictionary are set on top of the cross.

== Description ==
The alcove area at Joseph T. Taylor Memorial Hall is bordered with vegetation and the ground is covered with mulch. A concrete bench is located nearby to the proper right of the sculpture. There is a plaque attached to a piece of wood to the proper right of the sculpture reading "Derek Chalfant, Mother's Helper, Herron School of Art." The sculpture is placed on a concrete base measuring 9' long, 4' wide and 1" thick.

The sculpture consists of two main parts:

1. The first part is a stainless steel base in the form of a large cross. The cross is 8' long, 3' wide and 1' tall. In the center of the cross, a small bronze infant measuring 10" long, 6" wide and 4" tall, is curled in the fetal position and facing proper left. The crown of the head of the infant rests against the spine of a bronze dictionary measuring 9.5" long, 7" wide and 2" thick. The cross is bolted to the concrete in three places with a total of nine bolts.
2. The second part is a stainless steel highchair with elongated legs that terminate in rockers. The rockers run along the outer edges of the longer portion of the cross and extend to the cross's terminal end.

According to Chalfant, "the high chair represents nutrients needed for life, the rocker symbolizes rest and nuturing, [sic] the baby with its head on the dictionary represents knowledge, and the cross is a symbol of spirituality—all ingredients needed for human growth."

== Artist ==
Derek Chalfant was born in Danville, Indiana and earned a Bachelor of Fine Arts in Sculpture and Furniture/Woodworking from the Indiana University Herron School of Art in 1990 and a Master of Fine Arts from the University of Notre Dame in Notre Dame, Indiana in 1994. From 1993–2003, Chalfant taught sculpture at Notre Dame (except for a brief period in 1995, when Chalfant taught at Herron School of Art).

As of 2004, Chalfant's works had appeared in over 50 exhibits held in Illinois, Indiana, Kentucky, and Michigan. Some of his more notable works on Notre Dame's campus include The Visitation—a life-sized sculpture of Mary and Elizabeth outside the Hammes Bookstore—and "Holy Doors"—a bronze relief at Notre Dame's Basilica of the Sacred Heart.

Since 2003, Chalfant has taught at Elmira College in Elmira, New York as an assistant professor in subjects such as sculpture, contemporary art history, metal casting and furniture design. As of 2010, Chalfant has two fabricated stainless steel pieces—Dress and Flower—on display at the 23rd Rosen Outdoor Sculpture Competition and Exhibition at Appalachian State University in Boone, North Carolina.

=== Artist statement ===
In describing his own work, Chalfant stated the following: "Many of the forms I create, reminiscent of architecture and objects of suggested utility, security and protection, are used as metaphors for our psychological behavior, and for the phenomenology of the body. Architectural furnishing structures like a chair and table, allow me to explore specific polar states that are relevant to the structure and also to the personal psyche such as; large/small, inside/outside, private/public, adult/child, beginning/end, birth/death. The sculptures that I create are a means to reflect certain elements of our society. Paradox is probably the most poignant in my work. Part of the narrative in my pieces has to do with the human condition and in particular today's youth. Connotations of purity; innocence and promise are being subjected to some of the elements of the environment around it, which are disrespect, danger, violence and abuse."

== Related sculptures ==
=== Mother's Helper (2005) ===
In 2008, a book entitled 500 Chairs: Celebrating Traditional and Innovative Designs featured Derek Chalfant's Mother's Helper (2005). The overall concept of the 2005 indoor Mother's Helper is reminiscent of IUPUI's piece. The indoor version also features a tall highchair on rockers, but the sculpture is smaller at 96" tall and is constructed of wood, anodized aluminum, bronze, steel, rubber and powdered milk. It also does not have a cross at its base, and instead of an infant there are bronze infant clothes suspended between the legs of the painted red highchair.

=== Mother's Helper 2 ===
According to the portfolio on his official website, Chalfant has made an outdoor Mother's Helper 2 (date of creation and location unknown). The photographs of this sculpture reveal that it is virtually identical to IUPUI's Mother's Helper, except that there is no dictionary next to the infant in Mother's Helper 2.
