= Antenna Man (Nordgulen) =

Artwork by Eric Nordgulen

- Artist: Eric Nordgulen
- Year: 1998
- Type: Aluminum
- Dimensions: 339.5 cm (133.7 in)
- Location: Indianapolis, Indiana, United States; 39°46.257′N 86°10.328′W
- Owner: Indiana University-Purdue University Indianapolis

Antenna Man, a public sculpture by Eric Nordgulen, is located on the west side of the Herron School of Art and Design, which is on the Indiana University-Purdue University Indianapolis campus in Indianapolis, Indiana. The sculpture consists of blend of figure form and vessel shape. Antenna Man, which was created in 1998, took six months of labor to create and is constructed from fabricated Aluminium. It is approximately 339.5 cm in height, including the metal base, and it is approximately 385 cm tall, including a cement base. The cement base is approximately 45.5 cm in height and is 240.5 cm X 240.5 cm.

== Description ==
The sculpture is the prototype for a larger version, which was installed at Navy Pier, Chicago, Illinois in 1999. Made from fabricated aluminum and interlocking wires, the sculpture abstractly represents a human form. Aluminum was chosen as a material for Antenna Man because it is lightweight, contemporary in material, and lends itself well to the concept of an antenna.

== Information ==
Antenna Man is part of a series consisting of around six other antenna forms. One of these is located on Massachusetts Avenue, Indianapolis; this work is entitled Viewfinders. Another sculpture, also titled Antenna Man and similar in theme, is located in Crown Hill Cemetery in Indianapolis. Originally Antenna Man was left partially constructed while work was being completed on the larger version of Antenna Man (21 ft. by 3 ft. by 3 ft). The larger version was on exhibit at Navy Pier from May until October 1999; it was later moved to the campus of Illinois Institute of Technology.

Antenna Man was located outside the library on IUPUI's campus in the early 2000s. Antenna Man was on view at the library for approximately four years. After being placed outside the library, Antenna Man moved to outside the west side of Herron School of Art and Design.

Nordgulen interprets the human body as a sender and receptor for signals. The sculptures on Massachusetts Avenue, Indianapolis have Fresnel lens located in them, which intensify light and capture images from the surroundings and invert them. This allows the sculpture to create its own content based on what surrounds it and to incorporate that into the itself.

== Artist ==
Eric Nordgulen was born in Oklahoma, OK. He studied ceramics and sculpture at East Carolina University, where he received his Bachelor of Fine Arts in 1982. He attended Indiana University (Bloomington) for graduate school, where he received a Master of Fine Arts in sculpture and ceramics in 1985.

Nordgulen served as the Chair of the Fine Arts Department at Herron during the years 2004 through 2008. He is currently an Associate Professor of Sculpture at Herron. He typically works in series or in transition from series to series. It is clear from his work that he enjoys exploring materials investigating the history of the materials.

Nordgulen is currently working with Dr. Andrew Hsu on a project involving sustainable energy and public art. Through their collaboration, Hsu and Nordgulen hope to create a functioning piece of artwork that will generate energy.
