= Plaza (Riley Hospital for Children) =

Plaza with artworks in Indianapolis, Indiana, U.S.

Coordinates: 39°46.603′N 086°10.722′W

- Type: wood, metal, cast stone, brick, concrete
- Dimensions: Proper right base: 4 ft × 2 ft × 3 ft; Proper left base: 15 ft × 2 ft × 3 ft; Archway: 2.5 ft × 1 ft× 11 ft; Lion faces: 6 in diameter; Wall: 23.5 ft × 4.5 ft × 4 ft; Reservoir: 23.5 ft × 2.5 ft × 1 ft; Square sections: 2 ft × 2 ft; Faces: 6 in diameter; Tree stump: 2.5 ft × 1 ft diameter
- Location: Indiana University-Purdue University Indianapolis; Indianapolis, Indiana, United States

The plaza of the Indiana University-Purdue University Indianapolis campus was created in 1986 as part of the $56 million expansion to the Riley Hospital for Children.

Three different areas in the plaza include artworks of faces, including an archway, a brick wall, and a carved tree stump.

== Faces ==
=== Archway ===
The archway is located on the east side of the plaza and is composed of wood, metal, and cast stone lion faces. The wood is painted red and the woodwork is in a grid-like pattern. The outer perimeter is a square with an arch in the middle. There are three tiers that taper to the wavy wooden decoration at the top. Three lion faces are located on the front of the archway, one on both the left and right side and the third centered above the arch. It is located on a concrete and red brick base. Dimensions of the proper right base of the archway are 4’ in length, 2’ in width, and 3’ tall. The proper left base of the archway extends out longer to 15’ in length, 2’ in width, and 3’ tall. The archway itself has the dimensions of 2.5’ in length, 1’ in width, and 11’ tall (to the top of the final tier). All three lion faces are circular and the same size, measuring about 6” in diameter.

=== Wall ===
Wall section of plaza at Riley Hospital for Children.

Past the archway is the wall with faces, still on the east side of the plaza. The wall is made out of red brick and concrete and contains seven cast stone faces. There are two “face” designs that alternate down the wall, a cherub and a lion (the same that are found on the archway), and a square concrete section surround each. This wall has the features of a fountain, the cherub and lion faces have spouts and there is a white reservoir located below the faces. The top of the wall, through the middle, has an open section possibly used for planting flowers. The length of the wall is 23.5’, the width is 4.5’, and finally it is 4’ tall. The reservoir is 23.5’ in length, 2.5’ in width, and 1’ in height. The square sections around each face is 2' in length by 2' in width All of the faces are circular and the same size, measuring about 6” in diameter.

=== Tree stump ===
Tree stump in plaza at Riley Hospital for Children.

The tree stump is located on the east side of the plaza and has four different images carved into it. A moon is on the proper front, a troll-like creature is on the proper left, a full sun is on the proper back, and a man with a long beard is on the proper right. It measures 2.5’ tall and 1’ in diameter.

== Plaza information ==
The plaza was created by Ellerbe Associates of Bloomington, Minnesota as part of the $56 million expansion on Riley Hospital for Children in 1986. The wall of the plaza was a part of this expansion. The architect wanted to incorporate red brick into the design to commemorate Riley Hospital for Children's first building. The plaza was designed as a place for patients and visitors to relax and eat.

== Documentation ==
A Museum Studies course at IUPUI undertook the project of researching and reporting on the condition of 40 outdoor sculptures on the university campus. Untitled (Faces) was included in this movement. This documentation was influenced by the successful Save Outdoor Sculpture! 1989 campaign organized by Heritage Preservation: The National Institute of Conservation partnered with the Smithsonian Institution, specifically the Smithsonian American Art Museum. Throughout the 1990s, over 7,000 volunteers nationwide have cataloged and assessed the condition of over 30,000 publicly accessible statues, monuments, and sculptures installed as outdoor public art across the United States.
