= Barrow (sculpture) =

Artwork by Jill Viney

- Artist: Jill Viney
- Year: 2007
- Type: fiberglass and metal meshing
- Dimensions: 20 cm (8 in); 20 cm diameter (8 in)
- Location: Indianapolis, Indiana, United States; 39°46.286′N 86°10.244′W
- Owner: Indiana University-Purdue University Indianapolis

Barrow is a public sculpture by an American artist Jill Viney. It is located on the Indiana University-Purdue University Indianapolis campus, which is near downtown Indianapolis, Indiana. The sculpture is just north of the Herron School of Art on New York Street. This sculpture is made from a double wall of fiberglass encasing a sheet of metal meshing. Barrow measures 8-foot (2.4 m) and 8-foot (2.4 m) in diameter. Barrow was installed at IUPUI at noon on 7 May 2008.

== Description ==
Barrow consists of a molded fiberglass hemisphere with two entry ways. These entry ways are identical rectangular shapes with rounded edges. They are located directly opposite one another, with one located at the sculpture's proper front and the other at its proper back. The fiberglass is molded so that it forms a double wall around an encased sheet of metal meshing. The wall of the fiberglass that is seen from within the sculpture has been allowed to develop darkly, while the outside is light and shiny. The double wall of fiberglass occupies mass, but also contains space. This alters the viewers a changing perception of light and color.

From the outside, the fiberglass has been molded so that the thin vertical ridges begin at the bottom of one side, ascend framing the entry ways, and descend down the other side. These strips continue over the dome, and frame the entry way on the opposite side. The metal meshing gives the fiberglass an interesting visual effect of texture, within being able to feel it.

The sculpture sits on a square concrete base at a 45-degree angle. Once inside the sculpture, there is a rubber mat on the base to allow viewers to move within the space safely. Upon entering the sculpture, one is inclined to look up at its ceiling. There is a bullseye shaped pattern consisting of a thin red outline, surrounding a large blue circle. Within the blue circle is a smaller red outline surrounding a much smaller yellow circle.

== Commissioning ==
Barrow was commissioned for IUPUI in 2007. The sculpture was installed at the Herron School of Art on Wednesday, May 7, at noon. Barrow will remain on display for two years. Barrow was inspired by Viney's visits to caves and burial mounds in Ireland and France. The word barrow means a prehistoric burial mound used by Celtic people of France, England, Scotland, and Ireland. Viney's inspiration for the ceiling of Barrow came from her experience in an actual barrow in Ireland. While inside the mound's central rounded space, a beam of light came streaming in through a slot in the ceiling. These slots were used to chart the solstices, and the paths of the sun and moon. The space also had empty niches in the walls, resembling the entry ways in Barrow.

While visiting the Peche Merle cave in France along the river Dordogne, Viney discovered a cave with paintings and images lining the walls. The artists had crushed red oxide rock into a powder, and then blown it around their hands, leaving a negative imprint on the wall. The thumb and forefinger were touching, leaving behind a repeated circle pattern along the walls of the cave. This is red pattern is the influence for the red in Viney's patterned ceiling of Barrow

== Artist ==
Jill Viney was born in a coastal town in California. She earned her bachelor's degree at Sarah Lawrence College, and her Master of Fine Arts at Columbia University. Viney has used a quotation from Albert Einstein in her artist statement: "Look, look deep into nature and you will understand everything better." She is very interested in how advancements in technology allow us to see deeper into spaces that would otherwise be unseen. She alters the viewer's perceptions of light, space, and color.

As of September 2009, Barrow was Viney's most recent work. She is currently working on drawings to relate to the process used to create her latest sculpture.
