= John Torreano =

American artist from Michigan (born 1941)

- Born: John Francis Torreano; 1941 (age 84–85); Flint, Michigan
- Education: BFA, Cranbrook Academy of Art; MFA, Ohio State University
- Known for: Painting
- Website: johntorreano.com

John Torreano (born 1941) is an American artist from Michigan. He is currently clinical professor of studio art at the Steinhardt School of Culture, Education, and Human Development at New York University. Torreano is known for utilizing faceted gems in a variety of mediums in order to create "movement oriented perception" in his works. Artist Richard Artschwager described Torreano's works as "paintings that stand still and make you move."

== Career ==
John Francis Torreano was born in Flint, Michigan, United States in 1941. He earned his BFA from the Cranbrook Academy of Art in Bloomfield Hills, Michigan in 1963. He received his MFA from Ohio State University in 1967. In his career Torreano has visited nearly every major art school in the United States and Canada as an "artist in residence." Since 1992, he has been a clinical professor of studio art at the Steinhardt School of Culture, Education, and Human Development at New York University. He is currently director of the MFA in Studio Art Program.

Torreano has worked in a variety of mediums and methods including paint, sculpture, relief, furniture and hand-blown glass. His works have been exhibited at the Whitney Museum of Art and the Museum of Modern Art, New York, the Museum of Contemporary Art, Chicago, the Corcoran Gallery of Art, Washington, DC, the Indianapolis Museum of Art, Indianapolis, and many others. His series of paintings titled "TV Bulge" were featured in the 1969 Whitney Biennial.

== Major themes ==
Torreano grew up in a large Catholic family and spent much of his youth as an altar boy. Torreano states that the environment of the Catholic church influenced his art, with his use of jewels serving as a metaphor for vigil lights. Other religious influences appear in his pieces as well: his work in the 1980s included bejeweled crosses, and in recent years his paintings have used gems to create space-like constellations such as Exploding Galaxy (1981) and Star Field in Saggitarius (2003).

Throughout his career Torreano has investigated the properties of real and fake gemstones in the differing contexts of lighting, placement and materials. In 1972, as an artist in residence at the Art Institute of Chicago, Torreano first began integrating gems into his paintings. Torreano then experimented with jewel-encrusted columns in 1974-5 and later, intricate furniture pieces, such as a bejeweled mahogany table in 1983.

Torreano theorizes that all art "exists somewhere between a totally abstract creation and a total reproduction of physical things in the world." He believes that artists are similar to physicists in their use of theoretical models to gain insight into the physical world. Torreano uses the gem to bring together the world of theory and the world of things. Because gems are a geometric form as well as an object of popular culture, his use of fake gems can become real art by standing in the gap between the two. Because of this, Torreano describes his work as "real fake art." Torreano argues that humans have a role in fabricating and refining gems, just as the artist fabricates a sculpture. Because of this, Torreano's works can be considered more valuable than real gems because there are fewer of them and they are created by an individual artist, "making art value the highest value."

== Solo exhibitions ==
- 1968: The Whitney Museum School, New York NY
- 1987: 100 Diamonds. Jamie Wolf Gallery, New York NY
- 1988: John Torreano: Gems, Stars and Perpetual Thinking. Grand Rapids Art Museum, Grand Rapids MI
- 1988: Diamond Vases, An Installation. Museum of Modern Art, NY, NY
- 1989: John Torreano: Natural Models and Material Illusions. The Corcoran Gallery of Art, Washington DC
- 1993: Every Gem is a Hand Held Star. Norton Gallery of Art, Palm Beach
- 1997: John Torreano. Indianapolis Museum of Art, Indianapolis IN
- 1999: The Columns: Choreography of Perceptions. The Butler Institute of American Art, Youngstown OH
- 1999: John Torreano: Material World. JCCC Gallery of Art, Overland Park KS
- 2003: Center for Creative Studies, Detroit MI
- 2005: John Torreano. Armory Art Center, West Palm Beach, FL
- 2007: Scapes. Feature Inc., New York, NY
- 2008: Looking Close, Looking Far: A Survey of Artworks by John Torreano. Elaine L. Jacob Gallery, Wayne State University, Detroit, MI
- 2009: Remembering: Neighborhoods and Factories, Flint, Michigan. Gallery Space at NYU Wagner School of Social Service, NY, NY
- 2011: John Torreano Wall Constructions and Gems. Jean Albano Gallery, Chicago, IL
- 2014: Ghost Gems. Parrish Museum, Southampton, NY
- 2015: John Torreano. Susanne Hilberry Gallery, Ferndale, MI
- 2016: Above Below and Below Below. Projects Space, NYUAD Saadiyat Island Abu Dhabi, UAE
- 2017: Dark Matters Without Time. NYU Department of Art and Art Professions, Barney Building, NY, NY
- 2017: Color and Material, Reflection and Apparition. NYUAD, NY, NY

== Grants and awards ==
- 1979: Creative Arts for Public Service Program, New York NY
- 1982: National Endowment for the Arts Fellowship, Washington DC
- 1989: National Endowment for the Arts Fellowship, Washington DC
- 1991: John Simon Guggenheim Memorial Foundation, Fellowship
- 2003: The Nancy Graves Foundation Grant for Visual Artists
- 2009: University Council Visual Arts Initiative Award, NYU
- 2013: New York Abu Dhabi University Grant, NYUAD, UAE
- 2014: New York Abu Dhabi University Grant, NYUAD, UAE

== Publications ==
- 1992: John Torreano: Metaphors and Oxymorons (The Corcoran Gallery of Art, Washington DC)
- 2006: American Art Since 1900 (Blanton Museum of Art)
- 2007: Drawing by Seeing (Abrams Studio)

== See also ==
- Mega-Gem
