= Sasson Soffer =

American painter

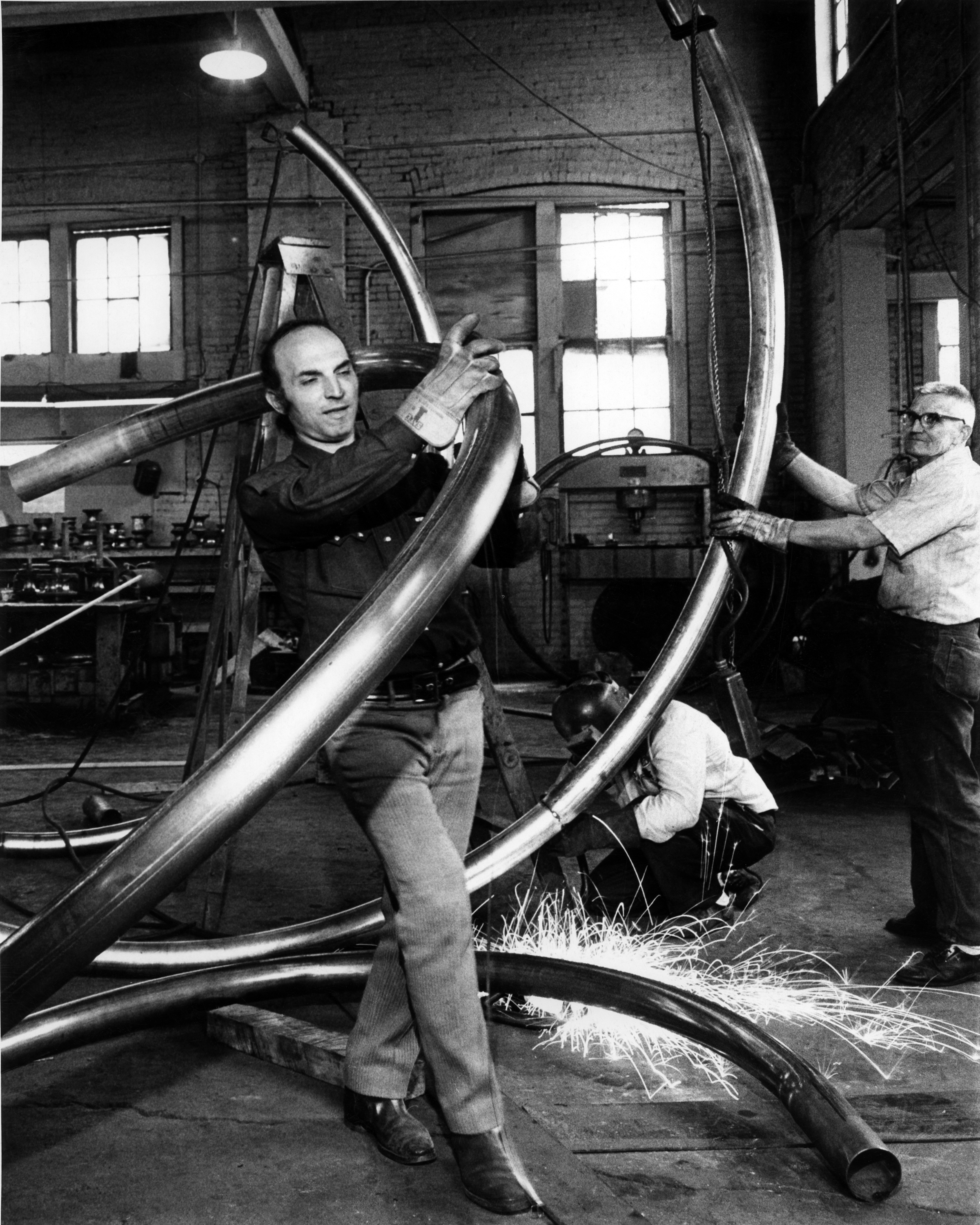
- Photo of Sasson Soffer in his New York studio, 1970s
- Born: 1925 (specific date not recorded); Baghdad, Iraq
- Died: October 17, 2009; Manhattan, New York, United States
- Education: Brooklyn College
- Known for: Sculpture, painting
- Notable work: "East Gate/West Gate" (1973)
- Movement: Abstract Expressionism, public art
- Awards: National Endowment for the Arts Grant; Whitney Museum Purchase Award; Ford Foundation Visiting Artist Award

Sasson Soffer (1925–2009) was an American abstract painter and sculptor. His work has been exhibited extensively throughout the world.

== Childhood and Education ==
Soffer was born in Baghdad. His father was a scribe, and Soffer spent a good part of his childhood drawing in his father’s studio. With the outbreak of the Arab-Israeli war in 1948 and the growing anti-Semitism in Iraq, Soffer went into hiding, finally escaping to Iran, then to the United States via Israel.

Between 1950 and 1954 Soffer was enrolled at Brooklyn College in New York. There he studied under artists including Ad Reinhardt, Burgoyne Diller and Mark Rothko. Rothko would be a lifelong friend and mentor, supporting Soffer throughout his career.

== Early work ==
Soffer dedicated the early part of his career to abstract painting. Influences from European artists like Paul Klee and Miró, as well as from his Brooklyn College instructors, are evident in the works produced during this period (the ‘50s and ‘60s). These paintings juxtapose dark shades with luminosity and a gentler, more refined European pictorial vocabulary.

Soffer had his first solo exhibition in 1958 at the Artist’s Gallery in New York City. He was featured in Art in America’s New Talent Issue in 1962. His works were also exhibited at the Betty Parson’s Gallery, Poindexter Gallery, and other galleries.

== Career ==
Beginning around 1963, Soffer began to focus on three-dimensional works and would become widely known as a public artist and for his conceptual, abstract approach to sculpture. He began to produce ceramic wall panels. Some of his most famous works are a series of abstract clay sculptures that incorporate manipulated sewer pipe forms. Soffer later turned to the use of stainless steel and glass in the production of his three-dimensional works.

Despite his activity in sculpture, Soffer continued to paint and draw. Among his last projects was a painting series that integrates human eyes within abstract forms.

Soffer’s work has been included twice in both the Whitney Museum Annual (now the Whitney Biennial) and Carnegie International exhibitions. It is in permanent collections of institutions including the Whitney Museum of American Art in New York City, the Albright-Knox Museum, and the Indianapolis Museum of Art. He created numerous permanent sculptures for institutions including Wayne State University, Lehman College, Bard College, Lincoln Center, and the Xi’an International Studies University in China.

The last five solo exhibitions of Soffer’s art during his lifetime were held at the Grandstreet Gallery in New York City. Four solo exhibitions of his sculpture works were held in New York’s Battery Park, in addition to solo exhibitions at other institutions including Lincoln Center, Columbia University, and New York University. Soffer was the recipient of a National Endowment for the Arts Grant and both the Whitney Museum Purchase Award and the Visiting Artist Award from the Ford Foundation. His work is also on display at Joseph Scarpinito's Tachi Gallery in New York's TriBeCa.

In 1998, the Sasson Soffer Foundation was incorporated as a nonprofit organization to promote patronage of his sculpture and painting. Among other activities, the Foundation has gifted Soffer’s sculptures to sites in various countries, among them China, Cuba, and Israel; and to various colleges, including Connecticut College and Queens College.

In 2006, the Town of East Hampton, New York, purchased a five-acre parcel of land from the Foundation and turned it into a Sculpture Park to exhibit Soffer’s sculptures.

The park is one of a continuing series of initiatives planned to reintroduce Sasson Soffer’s work to a broad audience. In 2011, The Tachi Gallery opened to the public in New York City with an inaugural exhibition titled “Sasson Soffer: The Abstract Experience.” It is one of several exhibitions planned to showcase his work.
