= Stangl =

Stangl is a German surname. Notable people with the surname include:

- Christian Stangl (born 1966), Austrian mountain climber
- Dalene Stangl (born 1956), American statistician
- Ernst Stangl (fl. 1970s), Austrian luger
- Franz Stangl (1908–1971), Austrian-born Nazi SS officer, commandant of Sobibor and Treblinka camps
- Johann Stangl (fl. 1950s), Austrian luger
- Josef Stangl (1907–1979), Roman Catholic bishop
- Karl Stangl (born 1930), Austrian rower
- Stefan Stangl (born 1991), Austrian footballer
- Thomas Stangl (1854–1921), German classical scholar
