= Procession of Ants =

Artwork by David Bowen

- Artist: David Bowen
- Year: 1998
- Type: Steel
- Dimensions: 110 cm (3.5 ft)
- Location: Indianapolis, Indiana, United States; 39°46.404′N 86°10.459′W
- Owner: Indiana University-Purdue University Indianapolis

Procession of Ants is a public sculpture by American artist, David Bowen, located on the Indiana University-Purdue University Indianapolis campus, which is near downtown Indianapolis, Indiana. The sculpture can be found in the flower bed of Taylor Hall on the north side of the building. It was accessioned in 1998 as a part of a competition to create more artwork for IUPUI.

== Description ==
Procession of Ants by David Bowen is a series of 15 ants made of steel. Stretching over a span of about 20 feet, the ants travel from the east to the west and up a wall. The grounds on which the sculpture is located consists of a flower bed holding trees and gravel. The back side of each ant consists of a large bent piece of steel facing open towards the east side. The centers and heads of the ants are smaller in size with oversize bent pieces of steel attached as legs. The sculpture was both created and acquired in 1998 when Bowen won the competition to create more artworks for IUPUI.

== Artist ==
The artist, David Bowen, works mostly with kinetic, robotic, interactive and sculptural pieces. Bowen attended Herron School of Art and Design for his undergraduate degree and he attended the University of Minnesota where he earned his MFA in 2004. He is now an assistant professor of sculpture at the University of Minnesota in Duluth. Bowen is interested in botany and the kinetic growth of organisms in relation to technology. In an interview, Bowen states that his work is based on interactive growth. In 2008, Bowen was a resident at Sculpture Space in Utica, New York.
