= Christadelphian Sunday School Union =

The Christadelphian Sunday School Union (CSSU) is an organisation which provides lessons, books, magazines and other services for Christadelphian Sunday schools and youth groups. The CSSU provides lessons both for the use of teachers, and also for distance education. Materials are divided for ages 3–6, 7–10, 11-14 and 14+.

The CSSU also publishes three magazines:

- My Sunday School Magazine, aimed at children aged 3–7.
- Bible Explorers, aimed at 7- to 11-year-old Sunday school children. It is published bimonthly and contains bible stories, lessons, puzzles and competitions. Until mid-2008 it was called Give and Take.
- The Word, for young people aged 11 and over
