= Casey Stengel (Sherbell) =

Sculpture by Rhoda Sherbell

- Artist: Rhoda Sherbell
- Year: 1965
- Type: Bronze
- Dimensions: 110 cm (43 in)
- Location: Indianapolis, Indiana, United States; 39°46.502′N 86°10.459′W
- Owner: Indiana University-Purdue University Indianapolis

Casey Stengel, a public sculpture by American artist Rhoda Sherbell, is located on the Indiana University–Purdue University Indianapolis campus, which is near downtown Indianapolis, Indiana. The sculpture can be found in the courtyard of the University Place Hotel. Installed in 2000, the sculpture was cast in bronze with a height of 43 inches.

== Description ==
Casey Stengel depicts the legendary baseball player cast in bronze by Rhoda Sherbell. Located in the courtyard of University Place, the sculpture stands 43" tall facing north. He is standing with his hands on his hips and head forward with a baseball cap. There is a baseball on the foot of the base lying next the player's left foot. Stengel is wearing his baseball uniform with the number 23 engraved on the back side. His age is shown through the wrinkles engraved on his face as well as his posture.

The sculpture is located next to the National Art Museum of Sport in the courtyard of University Place. It is based on the legendary baseball player and later manager of the New York Yankees and Mets.
