= Spirit Keeper =

Public artwork by Steve Wooldridge

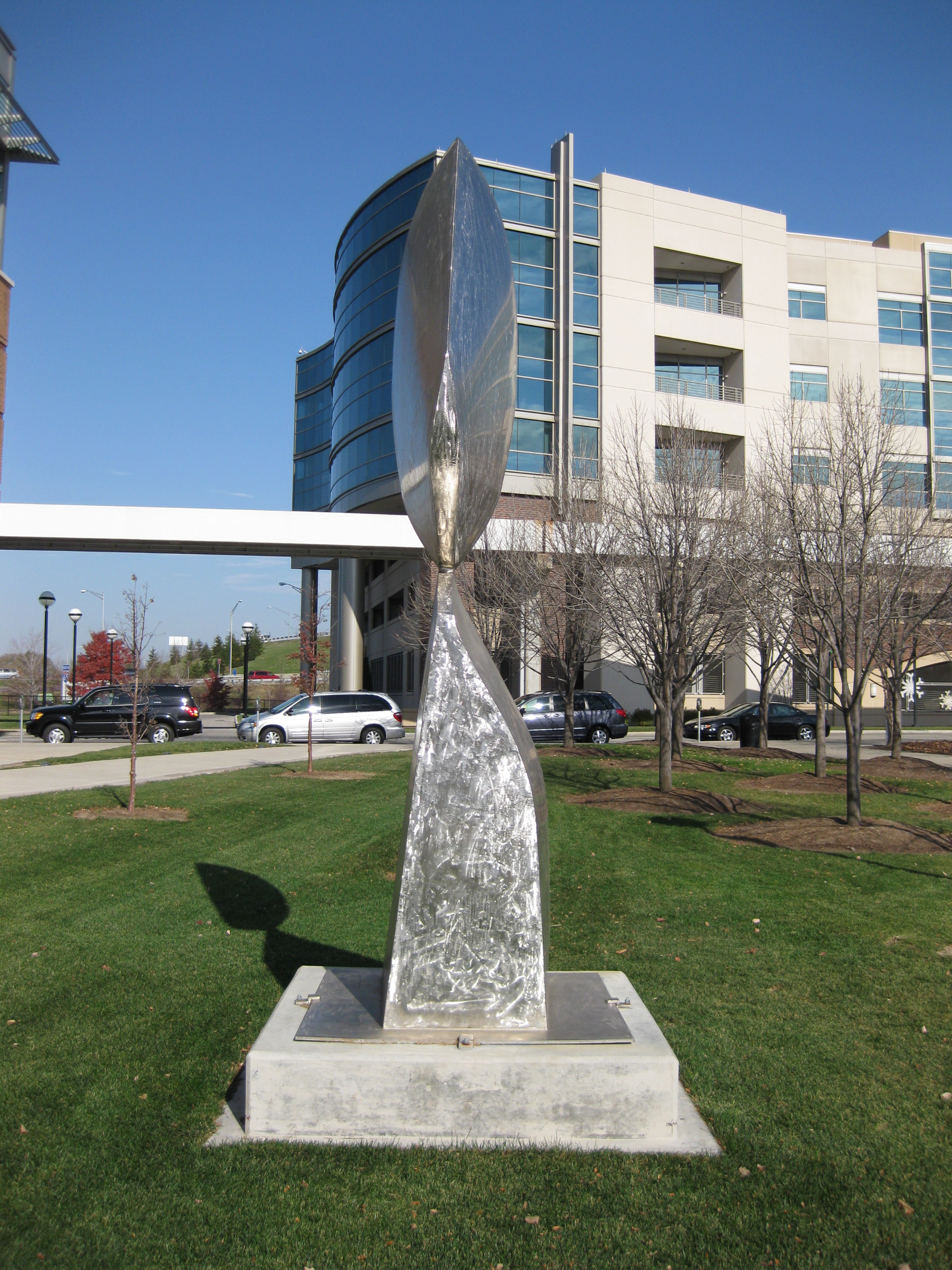
- Artist: Steve Wooldridge
- Year: 2007
- Type: Steel
- Dimensions: 2.0 m × 0.98 m × 0.98 m (6.5 ft × 3.2 ft × 3.2 ft)
- Location: Indianapolis, Indiana, United States; 39°46.915′N 86°9.997′W
- Owner: Indiana University-Purdue University Indianapolis

Spirit Keeper, a public sculpture by American artist Steve Wooldridge, is located on the Indiana University-Purdue University Indianapolis campus, which is near downtown Indianapolis, Indiana. The sculpture is located in front of IUPUI's HITS building near the Creation Café at 337 West 11th Street. Spirit Keeper is a steel sculpture installed here in 2007. It is 78 inches tall and sits on a metal base 40 inches square, which is bolted to a cement slab.

== Description ==
Spirit Keeper is a stainless steel abstract sculpture consisting of a leaf-shaped form perched atop a form that is rectangular at the bottom at narrow at the top. These two pieces are welded together to create the sculpture. The entire sculpture is 78 inches tall and sits on a metal base 40 inches square, which is bolted to a cement slab. The surfaces of the sculpture are shiny stainless steel but have been lightly sanded to create a pattern in the steel. There is an inscription on the proper left side of the sculpture in the lower proper right corner, which reads "SPIRIT KEEPER, S. WOOLDRIDGE, 2007."

The sculpture's design was approved by the Board of Trustees of Indiana University on September 21, 2007. It was donated to IUPUI by Norma Winkler. Prior to its installation on campus, the sculpture had originally been displayed outside of Norma Winkler's private home in Indianapolis

It is located in front of IUPUI's HITS building near the Creation Café at 337 West 11th Street. The design was approved in 2007, but it is unclear when it was actually installed.

== Inspiration ==
The Winkler family had been the principal owners of Rock Island Refinery on the city's northwest side. After the plant was sold to Marathon Oil Company in the early 1980s, Wooldridge salvaged the stainless steel used for the sculpture from dismantled portions of the refinery. The sculpture's inspiration was a large flare in the center of the plant that burned 24 hours a day, burning off lighter byproducts of refined crude that had no commercial use. The iconic flare could be seen burning at night from a great distance. Wooldridge's sculpture is meant to freeze the dancing movement and ever-changing look of that burning flame.

== Artist ==
Steve Wooldridge specializes in abstract and minimalist site-specific sculpture. He was born in Sheridan, Indiana and studied 3D Design and Sculpture at the Dayton Art Institute and sculpture technique at what was then the Herron Art Institute, now the Herron School of Art, graduating in 1963 with a degree in Sculpture. He has extensive experience in welding, fabrication and finishing of ferrous, non-ferrous metals, and exotic alloys through training with the US Navy. Wooldridge is a member of the Artist-Blacksmith's Association of North America. Fifty-two pieces of his blacksmithing work were exhibited at the Wells County Creative Art Center in Bluffton, Indiana during their “Forged Art! The Art of Blacksmithing” exhibit in 2007. In 1971, Wooldridge completed a sculpture of the 38th Infantry "Cyclone" Division of the Indiana National Guard to be exhibited in the Indiana World War Memorial Plaza. Another one of Wooldridge's sculptures, Zephyr, is also located on the IUPUI campus.

== Documentation ==
A Museum Studies course at IUPUI recently undertook the project of researching and reporting on the condition of 40 outdoor sculptures on the university campus. Spirit Keeper was included in this movement. This documentation was influenced by the successful Save Outdoor Sculpture! 1989 campaign organized by Heritage Preservation: The National Institute of Conservation partnered with the Smithsonian Institution, specifically the Smithsonian American Art Museum. Throughout the 1990s, over 7,000 volunteers nationwide have cataloged and assessed the condition of over 30,000 publicly accessible statues, monuments, and sculptures installed as outdoor public art across the United States.

== See also ==
- Zephyr
