= Zhou Brothers =

Chinese-American contemporary artists

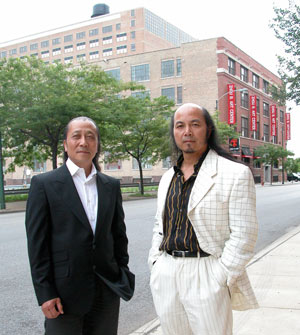
- The Zhou Brothers.
- Born: ShanZuo and DaHuang Zhou; 1952 and 1957; Guangxi Province, China
- Education: M.F.A., Painting and Fresco Painting, National Academy for Arts and Crafts, Beijing. B.F.A., Theater and Art
- Known for: Painting, sculpture, performance art
- Movement: Contemporary Art, Abstract Expressionism, Feelingism
- Website: www.zhoubrothers.com

Zhou Brothers (周氏兄弟) are Chinese-American contemporary artists: ShanZuo and DaHuang Zhou. ShanZuo was born in Nanning, Guangxi Province, China in 1952 and DaHuang was born in Wuming, Guangxi Province, China in 1957. Both were educated and trained in China, and together started their art career in 1973, and have been working collaboratively ever since. The Zhou Brothers moved to the United States in 1986 after having been at the cutting edge of the contemporary art movement in China in the 1970s and 1980s. The style of the Zhou Brothers' work is often very abstract, and has roots in the images of Chinese cave paintings. Later in their career, they incorporated more Western influences into their work. The Zhou Brothers have gained various awards and honors in their career in the United States and abroad.

== Early life ==
The Zhou Brothers were born into a family of scholars and educators. Early in his life, ShanZuo traveled with his father, a poet, and began to study poetry and Chinese history. They grew up in the early years of the People's Republic of China and Mao Zedong's Cultural Revolution. Because of the early political movements of the People's Republic, the brothers' father was forced to leave their family and his position as headmaster of a college, and the brothers were left in the care of their grandmother. Shan Zuo studied Chinese literature and painting, while DaHuang studied painting and music with his grandmother. In 1964, the family returned to Ning Ming, Guangxi Province, and the Zhou Brothers were able to see the cliff paintings in Fa Shan. The images there would have a great influence on their work.

The Cultural Revolution in 1966 caused significant upheaval, and the Zhou Brothers' family suffered. In 1968, ShanZuo separated from the family for a period of time to explore China on his own, and the entire family was exiled to the Da Ming Shan mountain range. During this time, both of the brothers were producing art, mostly experiments and sketches that would inform later collaborative pieces. The brothers reunited in 1973 and began their work as collaborative artists.

== Art and life in China ==
The Zhou Brothers worked together on their art in China from 1973 to 1986. Their first piece together, "The Wave," is still very important to the brothers, not just as their first image together, but as something of a self-portrait from the period. During this period, the brothers pursued other projects besides their art together. ShanZuo was a set designer for the local opera in Nanning, and DaHuang became a set painter for the Guangxi Dance Troupe. Both of these positions allowed the brothers slightly freer movement in China during the last years of the Cultural Revolution. In 1974, ShanZuo was hired as a director for a cavern excavation near Nanning, and in 1975 DaHuang graduated from high school. In 1976, the Cultural Revolution ended upon the death of Mao and the Zhou Brothers' work and lives took a huge leap forward. DaHuang was able to begin work for the National College of Guangxi as an Art Director in designing museum exhibits. "The Brothers suffered great difficulties, hardships, and separations in early years, learning through adversity to pursue freedom; gathering confidence to use their art for human communication, based in painful life experience, which brought about new thinking. Their rehabilitation of the ancient art language of Chinese culture, supplemented by modern techniques enabled them to make a fresh contribution to late century world art."

In 1977, they toured with an art group and the brothers began an in-depth study of folk art in different parts of the country. They wrote a series of articles entitled “A Study of Folk Art” that were published in several newspapers and art magazines. In 1978, the Zhou Brothers were accepted into the Shanghai Drama Institute where they studied Western painting and modern art.

== Art and life in the United States ==
The Zhou Brothers began work in the United States in 1986, settling in the Bridgeport area of Chicago, Illinois, where they still reside and work, while exhibiting nationally and internationally. They have held guest professorships at the International Academy for Art and Design at the Fachhochschule in Hamburg, Germany, 1996, and at the Sommerakademie in Salzburg, Austria, from 1996 to 2010. One of the most important demonstrations of their collaboration was the performance the Zhou Brothers gave during the opening ceremony of the World Economic Forum in Davos, Switzerland, in 2000. In front of the most important political, economic, and cultural leaders of the world, they created a large-format painting titled New Beginnings to give due treatment to their most important theme: mankind. Later, they were chosen to create a work of art in honor of President Hu Jintao's state visit on January 19, 2011. The work they created was part of a series called Portrait of History. The Zhou Brothers attended the ceremony at the White House when the painting was presented as a gift to President Hu Jintao.

== Zhou B Art Centers ==
In 2004, the Zhou Brothers, along with ShanZuo's son, Michael Zhou, started the Zhou B Art Center, which houses artist studios and multiple galleries.

The center was host to the Obama Foundation and former President Barack Obama on December 5, 2017. On December 7, 2017, Zhou B Art Center was featured in The New York Times as one of the “Five Places to Go in Chicago”. On December 8th, 2017, BuzzFeed rated Zhou B Art Center as the #1 figurative art gallery in the US.

In 2016, the curator and director of exhibitions was Sergio Gomez.

In 2024, they opened the Zhou B Art Center in Kansas City, Missouri. It is housed in the former Attucks School, which was originally an all-Black school built in 1905 and expanded in 1922. The Kansas City center includes artist studios, galleries, and event spaces. It is located on the perimeter of the historic 18th and Vine District.

== Series and major works ==
- "The Wave" (1976)
- "Dream of Chicago" (1987)
- Michigan Sculpture Park (2005)
- China Series
- Time: Portrait of History (2011)
- Feeling is Liberty (2013)
- "Ring of Life" (2014)
- Water Lily Pond of Life (2015)
- "Southern Gate"

== Selected recognition ==
1985

- National Prize of the Chinese Avant-Garde of the Ministry of Culture, Beijing, China
- Prize for Creativity, Peace Corps of the United Nations, Beijing, China

2006

- Lincoln Award (Illinois' Highest Honor) Lincoln Academy, IL

2011

- An invitation to the White House from President Barack Obama for a private presentation of state gifts with President Obama and President Hu Jintao of China.
- Honorary Professors of Guangxi University, Guangxi, China

2014

- Governor Pat Quinn proclaims October 16 as Zhou Brothers Day in Illinois

2015

- 35th Street in the Bridgeport neighborhood of Chicago renamed The Honorary Zhou Brothers Way by Mayor Rahm Emanuel
