= Luminary (Laramore) =

Public artwork by Jeff Laramore

- Artist: Jeff Laramore
- Year: 2008
- Type: Onyx
- Dimensions: 1.2 m × 1.5 m × 12 m (4 ft × 5 ft × 41 ft)
- Location: Indiana University-Purdue University Indianapolis; Indianapolis, Indiana, United States; 39°46.480′N 086°10.543′W
- Owner: Indiana University School of Medicine

Luminary, a public sculpture by American artist Jeff Laramore, is located on the Indiana University-Purdue University Indianapolis campus, which is near downtown Indianapolis, Indiana. This sculpture is made from onyx stone and sits as the cornerstone of the IU Simon Cancer Center at the northwest corner of West Michigan Street and University Boulevard.

The focal point of the sculpture is an onyx stone sphere that is illuminated at night. The sphere is approximately 50 inches (1.3 m) high with a circumference of 157 inches (4.0 m). The core sphere of the sculpture is surrounded by concrete supports pieces designed in a wave-like pattern. The dimensions of the sculpture with the concrete supports are approximately 4 feet (1.2 m) high, 41 feet (12 m) long, and 5 feet (1.5 m) wide.

== Design ==
Luminary consists of a sphere shape sculpture surrounded by a concrete wave design. The central sphere is made from thin tiles of onyx stone, specifically Sardonyx a variety of agate with reddish-brown dark and light bands of color. Each of the stone tiles ranges in size from 2 to 4 inches long with varying widths and are arranged in a swirling pattern. The sculpture is neutral in color with the stone varying from light flesh tone shades of beige to softer pink and reddish hues.

At nighttime the central sphere is illuminated by an internal light source. The glow of this light shines through the thin opaque onyx and creates the appearance of a luminary, a body or object that gives light. Two large "waves" of concrete embrace the central sphere. These concrete supports are approximately 18 feet long and have a groove pattern that matches the flower beds surrounding the sculpture.

== Commission ==
Luminary was commissioned by Clarian Health Partners to be part of the new I.U. Simon Cancer Center which opened in August 2008. It is located at the north-west corner of Michigan Street and University Boulevard. The sculpture has not been moved since it was installed in July 2008.

A plaque located at the north-west side of the sculpture reads:

Luminary

Embraced from all sides, this beacon of energy and enlightenment serves as the IU Simon Cancer Center's cornerstone. The central sphere is constructed of onyx-credited by some with the power to increase regeneration and foster new recognition of personal strengths.

Jeff Laramore 2nd Globe Studios -2008-

The hospital contacted design firm, 2nd Globe Studios, with studios in Indianapolis and Vancouver, BC, to start development on this sculpture and other pieces of art inside the IU Simon Cancer Center in 2004. Led by principal designer and 2nd Globe Studio co-founder Jeff Laramore, the firm submitted design intention documents in August 2005. Local companies were contracted to supply the materials and fabrication. 2nd Globe staff assembled the sphere's superstructure, an acrylic globe with internal supports and lighting attachments. The Santarossa Mosaic and Tile Company (http://www.santarossa.com/idex.htm) of Indianapolis supplied the selected onyx stone, cutting each piece, applying the stones to the sphere and then grinding, polishing and installing the sphere on site. Scenic View, Inc. of Chicago fabricated the curved walls under the artist's direction. The center piece of the sculpture, the stone sphere, was installed in August 2008.

=== Influences ===
Prior to the IU Simon Cancer Center building's groundbreaking in 2005, focus teams collected the thoughts and desires of patients and caregivers specific to cancer care. These teams met monthly and consisted of 20-25 patients, family members, and staff members who were cancer survivors. The focus teams started with the interior artwork of the building and then concentrated on exterior design in the courtyards. The team leaders used design images from magazines to evoke color, texture, and emotion. Key inspirations gleaned from those discussions identified the power of nature as an affirmation of life, where light inspires hope and meditative space brings peace and nurturing. The Luminary sculpture was designed to represent this spirit of hope, a spherical design that represented an eternal flame and the light glowing within each person.

== Artist ==
Jeff Laramore is the co-founder of the Indianapolis advertising firm Young & Laramore, a full service agency that has done business with Procter & Gamble, Goodwill Industries, and other well known companies. Jeff is also a Principal of 2nd Globe Studios a three-dimensional design studio and division of Young & Laramore. 2nd Globe Studios' work is primarily focused on the design, fabrication and installation of architectural/landscape features and sculptures for public places. This work is created to make public spaces communicate with people in ways that are relevant to the site, architecture, materials, purpose and subject of the assignment. 2nd Globe also works in the commercial world creating site-specific design elements meant to engage the consumer and communicate the essence of a brand. The company refers to the commercial variety of its design as "landmark media", which merges art and commerce. If you are interested in finding out more about "landmark media" read the following article from the President of Young & Laramore.

Jeff served as both a sculptor and the Design Principal on the Luminary sculpture. He is an Indiana native with family roots in Knox and Middleton, Indiana and graduated with a B.F.A. in Design from Indianapolis' Herron School of Art in 1980. While at Herron he earned the President's Commission on the Handicapped for best poster design award. Jeff began his career as an illustration artist before becoming a nationally recognized graphic designer.

Business partner and friend David Young describes Jeff Laramore's work in the following way, "With his ability to see and render he can do all of that and he can do it in layers of color in art or in shapes. He can render things so brilliantly and he has that craft and patience and the intelligence to know the sequence to lay things down and to have them, once when they're done, they sing they breathe." Laramore has made a name for himself within the corporate sculpture world and many of his sculptures are seen as not only art, but also as landmarks and investments. Jeff Laramore is currently working on an art filled central plaza that will be part of the Marriott Place Indianapolis, Marriott's forthcoming five-in-one hotel collection in downtown Indianapolis. Laramore's 36-foot-tall stylized sculpture of a cardinal (the Indiana state bird) will be the plaza's signature piece.
