= Zephyr (sculpture) =

Stainless steel artwork in Indianapolis

- Artist: Steve Wooldridge
- Year: 1998
- Type: Stainless steel
- Dimensions: 4.0 m × 3.0 m × 0.61 m (13 ft × 10 ft × 2 ft)
- Location: Indianapolis, Indiana, United States; 39°46.339′N 86°10.277′W
- Owner: Indiana University – Purdue University Indianapolis

Zephyr is a public sculpture created by artist Steve Wooldridge in 1998. It is located southeast of the Indiana University-Purdue University Indianapolis (IUPUI) University Library and north of New York Street on IUPUI's campus. The overall dimensions of this stainless steel sculpture are 13 feet (4.0 m) tall, 2 feet (0.61 m) long, and 10 feet (3.0 m) wide.

== Description ==
Zephyr is composed of several different three-dimensional geometric shapes, all made of stainless steel. Its base is a rectangle that measures 3 feet (0.91 m) tall and 2 feet (0.61 m) wide. Next are two cylinders lying on their sides with a north–south orientation. They each have a diameter of 8.5 inches (22 cm) and a length of 17 inches (43 cm). On top of the cylinders is a right triangle that measures 4 feet (1.2 m) tall and 20 inches (51 cm) on the shortest side. It lies at an angle so that the right angle rests between the two cylinders. A third cylinder rests on top of the triangle and it measures 6.5 inches (17 cm) in diameter and 1.5 feet (46 cm) long. On top of this cylinder and the triangle is a large hoop with a diameter of approximately 7 feet (2.1 m). There is a 10 feet (3.0 m) pole going through the hoop from the proper bottom right to the proper top left. It passes behind the hoop on the proper left and in front of the hoop on the proper right, where a semi-hollow cylinder with a diameter of 1 foot (30 cm) and a length of 10 inches (25 cm) rests.

"Steve E. Wooldridge", "1998", and "Zephyr" are visible on the metal next to the proper right side of the base.

== Information ==
"Zephyr" means "west wind" and is also the name of a pioneer streamlined locomotive, dating to the 1930s. Each of the eight geometric shapes has a meaning. The rectangular base represents the core of education. The two side-by-side cylinders represent the wheels of progress while the triangle represents a mode of transportation designed for speed. The small cylinder that supports the hoop signifies fortitude and determination and the hoop itself stands for the circle of life. The long pole represents ambition and the hollow scroll stands for the scroll of knowledge. The artist dedicated the sculpture to today's youth.

=== Acquisition ===
The Indiana University Board of Trustees approved the decision to keep the Zephyr sculpture on the IUPUI campus permanently at their January 28, 2005, meeting. Prior to this it had been on loan to the university for two years.

== Artist ==
Steve Wooldridge was born in Sheridan, Indiana. He attended the Dayton Art Institute where he studied three-dimensional design and sculpture. He graduated from the Herron School of Art in 1963 with a degree in sculpture. His preferred styles are abstract, assemblage, and minimalism. Wooldridge is known for his site specific sculpture for indoors and outdoors, and he is a member of the Artist Blacksmith's Association of North America. Fifty-two of his massive blacksmithing pieces were featured in the exhibit "Forged Art! The Art of Blacksmithing" at the Wells County Creative Art Center in Bluffton, Indiana in late 2007. Another of Wooldridge's sculptures, Spirit Keeper, is also located on the IUPUI campus.

== Documentation ==
A Museum Studies course at IUPUI recently undertook the project of researching and reporting on the condition of 40 outdoor sculptures on the university campus. Zephyr was included in this movement. This documentation was influenced by the successful Save Outdoor Sculpture! 1989 campaign organized by Heritage Preservation: The National Institute of Conservation partnered with the Smithsonian Institution, specifically the Smithsonian American Art Museum. Throughout the 1990s, over 7,000 volunteers nationwide have cataloged and assessed the condition of over 30,000 publicly accessible statues, monuments, and sculptures installed as outdoor public art across the United States.
