= Weather Tower =

Artwork by Jerald Jacquard

- Artist: Jerald Jacquard
- Year: 1985
- Type: Steel
- Dimensions: 6.2 m × 1.8 m × 2.1 m (20.5 ft × 6 ft × 7 ft)
- Location: Indianapolis, Indiana, United States; 39°46.416′N 86°11.106′W
- Owner: Indiana University-Purdue University Indianapolis

Weather Tower, a public sculpture by American artist Jerald Jacquard, is located on the Indiana University-Purdue University Indianapolis campus, which is near downtown Indianapolis, Indiana. The sculpture is located off White River Parkway East Drive in a plaza near IUPUI campus housing. Jacquard created this 20.5-foot-tall (6.2 m) painted steel sculpture in 1985. It was acquired by the Indianapolis Museum of Art in 1999, where it stood at the front entrance until de-accessioned and moved to IUPUI's campus in 2005.

== Description ==
Five elongated cubist forms make up Weather Tower. These forms vary in size and shape and are stacked upon each other to create this 20-foot-tall (6.1 m) sculpture. The entire form is painted in a deep purple color. The structure is attached to a 6-foot-square (1.8 m) concrete base by four large bolts directly attached to the piece, as well as one support arm that is attached to the proper back of the sculpture and attached to the base by four bolts as well. When viewing the sculpture, the placement of shapes alters the look of the piece depending on where the viewer is standing. The sculpture is signed on the proper back just above the support arm.

== Information ==
While owned by the Indianapolis Museum of Art, the sculpture was a part of the Rita and John Grunwald Collection. The work was given and estimated value of $25,000 by the IMA. The sculpture was gifted to IUPUI by the IMA in the spring of 2005 and moved to its current location on campus shortly thereafter. Prior to coming to the campus of IUPUI, Weather Tower was located near the front entrance of the Indianapolis Museum of Art at 4000 Michigan Road, Indianapolis, Indiana. Now residing on the IUPUI campus, the sculpture is located on the east side of White River Parkway East Drive between Hine Street and Vermont Street in a plaza on the property of IUPUI campus housing. Since its installation on the campus, the sculpture has not been moved.

== Artist ==
Jerald Jacquard was born in 1937 in Lansing, Michigan. He earned a Bachelor of Arts in 1960 and a Master of Arts in 1962, both from Michigan State University.

In Linda Finkelstein's article, Sculptor Jerald Jacquard's Work Celebrated at the IMA, she refers to Jacquard as a "pioneer in reviving interest in large scale sculpture for outdoors."

When Jacquard works, he begins by developing these sculptures from detailed scale models or maquettes.

Monumental means monuments. I don't make monuments. I make big sculpture.

— Jerald Jacquard, December 1992

Jacquard is Professor Emeritus of Sculpture at the Henry Radford Hope School of Fine Arts at Indiana University. He received a Guggenheim Fellowship for monumental sculpture and a Fulbright Scholarship to study bronze casting in Florence, Italy.
