= Rhoda Sherbell =

American sculptor

- Born: 1933 (age 92–93)
- Education: William Zorach
- Known for: sculpture
- Awards: American Academy of Arts and Letters

Rhoda Sherbell (born 1933) is a contemporary American sculptor, consultant, and teacher whose work is displayed in prominent institutions and has won many awards.

== Life ==
She was born in Brooklyn; New York gave her access to world class museums that gave her an early appreciation of art. She studied under William Zorach, originally as a painter and then a sculptor. Zorach asked her to paint his and his wife's, Marguerite's portrait, but she refused because it was unimaginative.

== Career ==
Her work has been commissed by the Baseball Hall of Fame in Cooperstown, NY as well as private commissions from Yogi Berra, Casey Stengel, Daniel Burke and Aaron Copland, among a host of other celebrities. Her sculptures are in the permanent collections of twenty-five museums throughout the country, including the Museum of Modern Art, the Smithsonian American Art Museum, the National Portrait Gallery, the Jewish Museum, the State Museum of Connecticut, William Benton Museum of Art, and the Brooklyn Museum. She is a member of the National Academy and is on the board of the Portrait Society of America.

== Awards ==
In 1960, Sherbell was inducted into the American Academy of Arts and Letters alongside Philip Roth and Norman Mailer. In 2013, the National Association of Women Artists awarded Sherbell as Artist of the Year, an award previously won by artists including Mary Cassatt and Gertrude Vanderbilt Whitney. In 2016, she was listed as a faculty member of the Portrait Society of America She has won awards at the National Sculpture Society; the Presidents Award at National Arts Club; is the recipient of a Ford Foundation Grant; Louis Comfort Tiffany Foundation Grant; Allied Artists Award; Medal of Honor, Audubon Artists; and several awards at the National Academy.
