= The South Tower (sculpture) =

Outdoor sculpture by Don Gummer

- Artist: Don Gummer
- Year: 2008
- Type: Aluminum, stainless steel
- Subject: Representation of the South Tower of the World Trade Center collapsing during the September 11 attacks.
- Dimensions: 300 cm × 91 cm × 61 cm (10 ft × 3 ft × 2 ft)
- Location: Indiana University-Purdue University Indianapolis, Indianapolis, Indiana, United States; 39°46′15″N 86°10′13″W
- Owner: Don Gummer

The South Tower is a stainless steel outdoor sculpture depicting the South Tower of the World Trade Center the moment before it collapsed during the attacks on September 11, 2001. Created as a tribute to the victims of the attack and designed by American artist Don Gummer, it is located on the Indiana University-Purdue University Indianapolis (IUPUI) campus, near downtown Indianapolis, Indiana, and owned by the artist. The sculpture is made of frosted stainless steel aluminum.

== Description ==
The South Tower is an abstract, frosted stainless steel aluminum rectangular sculpture. Measuring 10 ft x 3 ft x 2 ft, the structure is vertically louvered and is depicted as coming apart at the top. The grate-like design of each section is carried through the sculpture creating a leaning, S-shaped structure. Each section is composed of 11 straight bars of aluminum. Four bolts secure the artwork to the circular concrete base. It is signed "Don Gummer 2008" on the front of the artwork, at the top of the bottom element.

== Reception ==
"It's a tall, rectangular, vertically-louvered sculpture that starts to come apart at the top. It's very simple. [I was] on my way to the studio when the (September 11, 2001) attack occurred, and I saw the South Tower fall. It's seared in my memory." The Dean of Herron School of Art and Design, Valerie Eickmeier, said "The South Tower will contribute to the ongoing dialogue about contemporary public sculpture. It is perfectly placed in Herron's sculpture garden to engage visitors on the Indianapolis Cultural Trail."

== See also ==
- Memorials and services for the September 11 attacks
- Public works by Don Gummer
