= Give and Take (Smith) =

Artwork by Michael Smith

- Artist: Michael Smith
- Year: 2005
- Type: Mild Steel
- Location: Indianapolis, Indiana, United States; 39°46.287′N 86°10.388′W
- Owner: Indiana University-Purdue University Indianapolis

Give and Take, a sculpture by American artist Michael Smith, is located on the campus of Indiana University-Purdue University Indianapolis in downtown Indianapolis, Indiana. It is situated on New York Street in front of the Herron School of Art and Design. The sculpture was made in 2005.

== Description ==
Give and Take is made of fabricated mild steel and is painted yellow. It is on a metal sheet, which is situated on top of an 8-inch concrete platform. The placement of the sculpture is in front of the Herron School of Art and Design facing southwest. The sculpture was placed at its present location along New York St. in front of the Herron School of Art and Design in 2005, the same year that Eskenazi Hall, the building for Herron School of Art and Design, was completed. Originally the school was located at 16th St. and Pennsylvania St. in Downtown Indianapolis.

== Documentation ==
A Museum Studies course at IUPUI recently undertook the project of researching and reporting on the condition of 40 outdoor sculptures on the university campus. Give and Take was included in this movement. This documentation was influenced by the successful Save Outdoor Sculpture! 1989 campaign organized by Heritage Preservation: The National Institute of Conservation partnered with the Smithsonian Institution, specifically the Smithsonian American Art Museum. Throughout the 1990s, over 7,000 volunteers nationwide have cataloged and assessed the condition of over 30,000 publicly accessible statues, monuments, and sculptures installed as outdoor public art across the United States.
