= Portrait of History =

Artwork by Shan Zou Zhou

Coordinates: 39°46.244′N 86°10.235′W

- Artist: Zhou Brothers
- Year: 1997
- Type: Bronze
- Dimensions: 2.5 m × 0.76 m × 0.61 m (8.3 ft × 2.5 ft × 2 ft)
- Location: Indiana University-Purdue University Indianapolis; Indianapolis, Indiana, United States

Portrait of History, a public sculpture by Chinese American artists Zhou Brothers, is located on the Indiana University-Purdue University Indianapolis campus, which is near downtown Indianapolis, Indiana. The sculpture is located at the Blackford Street entrance to the Herron School of Art and Design. This piece is one of four public artworks on loan from the Indianapolis Museum of Art to IUPUI. The artworks were moved to the campus on March 22, 2009. Portrait of History is a bronze sculpture measuring 100 x 24 x 30 in and is mounted on an oval cement base.

== Description ==
Portrait of History is a tall, narrow bronze sculpture measuring 100 x 24 x 30 in. Its surface is uneven, imitating mud or gauze wrappings. "For Portrait of History Zhou Brothers used bronze, a prehistoric material, to create a primitive figure that recalls myths and legends across cultures.” Portrait of History is a highly simplified humanoid sculpture. The lower portion of the sculpture starts out as a cylindrical shape that tapers up to a relatively consistent diameter. Slightly more than halfway up the sculpture are two abstracted wing-like appendages jetting out of the proper right and proper left of the piece. The cylindrical shape continues up from the “wings” into an abstract bulbous head that is arched slightly forward. The sculpture is similar in shape and texture to other sculptures in bronze and beech wood by the Zhou brothers.

== Information ==
Portrait of History was a gift to the Indianapolis Museum of Art from Dr. and Mrs. Eugene Van Hove. It was given in memory of their son, Jeffrey Van Hove, in 2001. This piece shares its name with a series of four oil on paper paintings by the Zhou Brothers that were painted in 1975; these paintings are much less abstract than the Zhou Brothers’ sculptural work and show heavily texturized images of traditional Asian portraits.

== Artist ==
The Zhou Brothers, Shan Zuo and Da Huang Zhou, were born in China in 1952 and 1957 respectively. They have been living in Chicago since 1986. Their work attempts to capture an image of the collective unconscious beyond cultural boundaries, inspired by a combination of Eastern and Western philosophy, literature, myth and history. Shan Zuo and Da Huang Zhou received a BFA in drama and painting at the University of Shanghai in 1982 and received an MFA from the National Academy for Arts and Crafts in Beijing in 1984. In 1986 the Zhou brothers came to a hard realization that they would not be able to progress artistically if they stayed in China. After an invitation to exhibit in Chicago Illinois the brothers set up a permanent studio there. Based out of Chicago, the brothers exhibit their work nationally and internationally. Their work has been collected by private and public institutions. In 2004 a retrospective exhibition “Zhou Brothers: 30 Years of Collaboration” was organized in Chicago. The retrospective was divided into three major periods of the brothers life: China (1973–1985), America (1986–1993) and Europe and America (1994–2003) The brothers have exhibited throughout the United States, Germany, Switzerland, Taiwan, Japan, France, Netherlands and Hungry. Zhou Brothers: A Retrospective. Feingarten Galleries and East West Contemporary Company: 1989. Currently, Shan Zuo Zhou works closely with his brother Da Huang Zhou, together forming an internationally known and exhibited artistic team called The Zhou Brothers.

== Location history ==
Prior to moving to the Indianapolis Museum of Art Portrait of History was privately owned. Portrait of History was located on the south east grounds of the Indianapolis Museum of Art near the Better than New House. The sculpture is currently located on the IUPUI campus at the Blackford Street entrance to the Herron building.

== Documentation ==
A Museum Studies course at IUPUI recently undertook the project of researching and reporting on the condition of 40 outdoor sculptures on the university campus. Portrait of History was included in this movement. This documentation was influenced by the successful Save Outdoor Sculpture! 1989 campaign organized by Heritage Preservation: The National Institute of Conservation partnered with the Smithsonian Institution, specifically the Smithsonian American Art Museum. Throughout the 1990s, over 7,000 volunteers nationwide have cataloged and assessed the condition of over 30,000 publicly accessible statues, monuments, and sculptures installed as outdoor public art across the United States.

== See also ==
- Bronze
