= Temple VI =

Public sculpture in Indianapolis, Indiana

- Artist: Austin Collins
- Year: 1996
- Type: Steel
- Dimensions: 315 cm × 76 cm × 112 cm (10.33 ft × 2.5 ft × 3.67 ft)
- Location: Indianapolis, Indiana, United States; 39°46.366′N 86°10.478′W
- Owner: Indiana University-Purdue University Indianapolis

Temple VI, a public sculpture by American artist Austin Collins, is located on the Indiana University-Purdue University Indianapolis campus, which is near downtown Indianapolis, Indiana. The piece is on an indefinite loan from the artist to Indiana University-Purdue University Indianapolis (IUPUI) and is located outside of the east entrance to Lecture Hall, a building on IUPUI's campus. Lecture Hall, nicknamed LE on campus maps, is located at 325 University Boulevard in Indianapolis, Indiana in the United States. The sculpture was created in 1996.

Temple VI is 3.67' long by 2.5' wide by 10.33' high. The metal work of public art has a base of four pieces made from the same steel material that is bolted to the concrete sidewalk. On the lower proper right portion of the sculpture, near the base, lies a foundry mark that identifies the title, artist, and location of the sculpture's creation.

== Description ==
Temple VI is an abstract steel sculpture consisting of a four-footed base that rises to a central, rectangular raised platform that supports the upper portion of the sculpture. The main body of Temple VI is similar to a vertical I-beam with extra pieces welded onto the body. Some of these additions are crossing, semi-circular pieces; others are dagger-like pieces that hang from a higher level; still others are square blocks that were added. At the top of the sculpture lies a circular level piece with a tall, abstract form extending into the air.

A foundry mark just above the feet of the base on the proper fight side tells the title, artist, and location of creation for Temple VI. It reads: Temple VI, by Austin Collins, Notre Dame, Indiana.

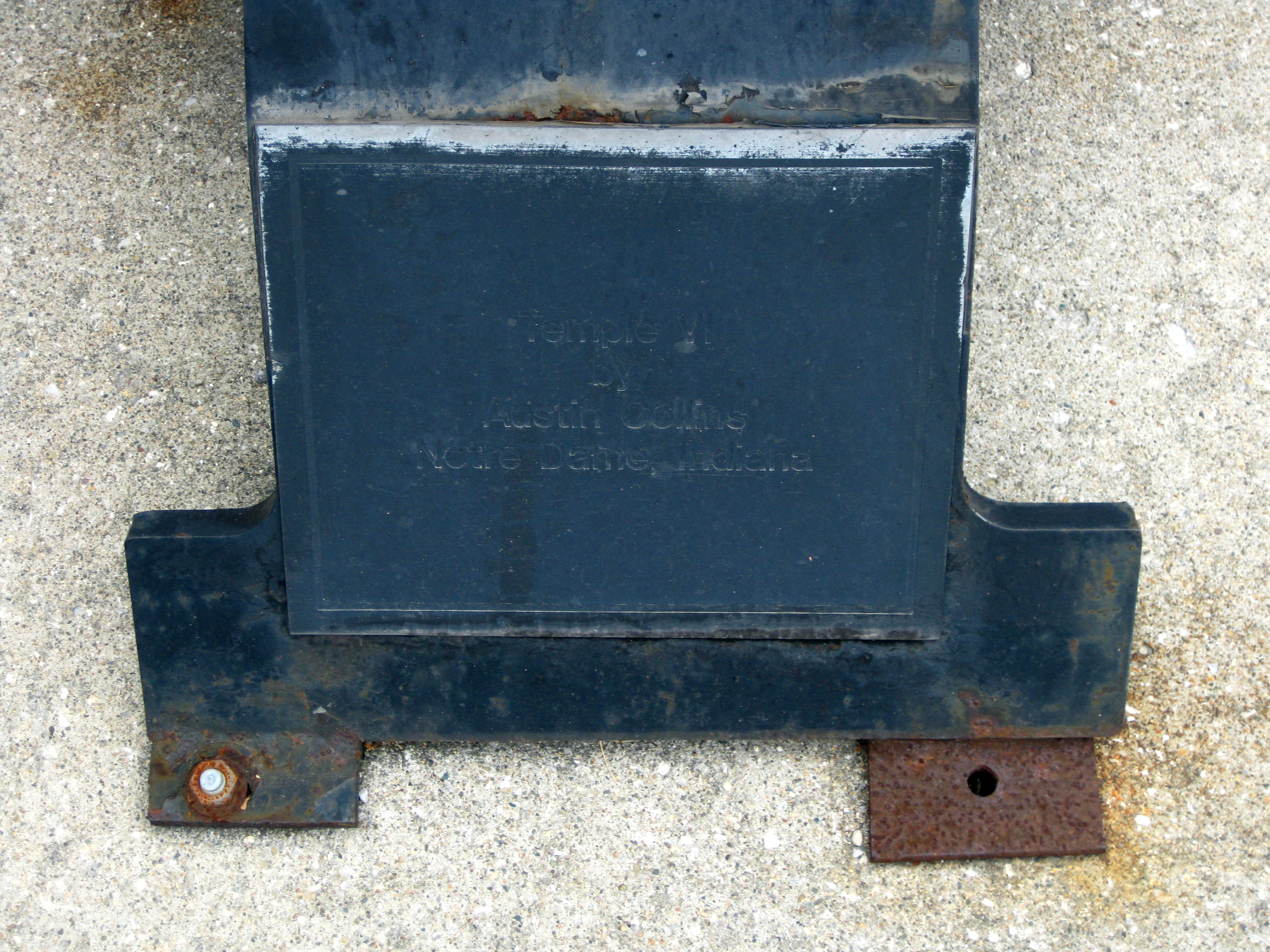
Detail of foundry mark stating title, artist, and original location. Note that one of the four bolts anchoring the sculpture to the sidewalk is missing.

Artist Austin Collins has been quoted as saying: "In my recent work, The Temple Series, I hope to invoke in the viewer a sense of sacred space, of retreating, of reflection. By constructing a space with abstract geometric steel forms, referencing architecture, games, and toys, Temple VII [and the Temple series] generates a bodily response from both structural and compositional.

According to the IUPUI Community Relations Virtual Art Tour, Collins has described the Temple Series "as celebrating the convolutions of the individual by first isolating the self as unique, and then by reintroducing that self into a community of similar and dissimilar selves which, taken together, form a more whole or complete landscape that ultimately gives the self meaning".

== Information ==
Temple VI is part of a collection of outdoor sculptures on loan to IUPUI and located on their campus. This sculpture was added to the collection in either 2003 or 2004.

Temple VI is part of a larger series of sculptures: Temple Carousel, Temple Flag, Temple V, Temple VI, Temple VII, Temple VIII, Temple IX, Temple X, Temple XII, Temple XIII, Temple XVIIII, Temple XX, Temple XXI, and Temple XXII. There is another work also titled Temple VI by Austin Collins in Lancaster, Ohio. This second version is a completely different size {6'2x3'1x2'0} and form than the one located at IUPUI. Austin Collins offered Temple VI as an object for loan after it was displayed in the White River State Park. The terms of the loan are unknown, with no specific loan period or expiration.

Temple VI was previously located on the Washington Street bridge in the White River State Park in downtown Indianapolis. The White River State Park created a "Sculpture in the Park" exhibition program in 1999 to "showcase the works of Indiana artists and make art accessible to all Hoosiers and visitors".

Currently Temple VI is on the IUPUI campus.

== Artist ==
Austin Collins is a professor in the Department of Art, Art History, and Design at the University of Notre Dame. He is both a priest and professor, as he has received a Master of Fine Arts degree in 1985 from Claremont Graduate University, a private, graduate-only school in Claremont, California, and also earned a Master of Divinity degree from the Graduate Theological Union in Berkeley, California in 1981. Collins also received his bachelor's degree from Notre Dame in 1977.

He is a prolific sculptor whose works are "included in many collections, including Loyola, University of Chicago, and California State University-Hayward". Collins recently served as a visiting judge for Eastern Illinois University's 2009 Sculpture residency and Exhibition Program".

Collins usually creates sculptures that can be categorized as public art, large outdoor sculpture, installation art and Liturgical art. His work often explores themes related to past and present political and social issues. He is represented by Wood Street Gallery and Sculpture Garden, within 30 private and public collections. As of November 2009, Collins has pieces of his work on view at:

- Lincolnwood Sculpture Park, Lincolnwood, Illinois
- 900 Massachusetts Avenue, Indianapolis, Indiana
- Western Michigan University, Kalamazoo, Michigan
- University of Indianapolis, Indianapolis, Indiana
- Appalachian State University, Boone, North Carolina.

== Documentation ==
A Museum Studies course at IUPUI recently undertook the project of researching and reporting on the condition of 40 outdoor sculptures on the university campus. Temple VI was included in this movement. This documentation was influenced by the successful Save Outdoor Sculpture! 1989 campaign organized by Heritage Preservation: The National Institute of Conservation partnered with the Smithsonian Institution, specifically the Smithsonian American Art Museum. Throughout the 1990s, over 7,000 volunteers nationwide have cataloged and assessed the condition of over 30,000 publicly accessible statues, monuments, and sculptures installed as outdoor public art across the United States.
