= Torso Fragment =

Public sculpture by Casey Eskridge

- Artist: Casey Eskridge
- Year: 2005
- Type: Aluminum
- Dimensions: 94 cm × 43 cm × 51 cm (37 in × 17 in × 20 in)
- Location: Indianapolis, Indiana, United States; 39°46.279′N 86°10.358′W
- Owner: Indiana University-Purdue University Indianapolis

Torso Fragment, a public sculpture by the American artist Casey Eskridge, is located on the Indiana University–Purdue University Indianapolis (IUPUI) campus, near downtown Indianapolis, Indiana. The piece was donated to IUPUI and is located outside of the west entrance to Eskenazi Hall on the IUPUI campus. Eskenazi Hall houses Indiana University’s Herron School of Art and Design and is located at 735 W. New York Street in Indianapolis. The sculpture was created in 2005.

Torso Fragment is 20" long by 17" wide by 37" high. The metal work of public art stands atop a concrete base, with a label identifying the artist, title and year of creation on the proper front (south side) of the base.

== Description ==
Torso Fragment Proper Back, by Casey Eskridge, 2005. Notice how the S Curve is clearly visible from the proper back of the sculpture.

"The torso piece, commissioned by his alma mater, the Herron School of Art and Design in Indianapolis, resembles a piece from classical antiquity, except that instead of being carved in stone, it's formed from aluminum." Eskridge's creation of Torso Fragment was clearly influenced by the classical sculpture developed during the 5th century BC in Ancient Greece and the exaggerated contrapposto form.

This silver sculpture of a male torso twists in a classical S Curve form, with the proper right thigh extending forward and its counterpart — the proper left thigh — in a flexed, straight position. The S Curve continues with a slight twist in the torso and finishes with the proper right shoulder raised while proper left shoulder slacked and extended downward. The sculpture has been described as "a truncated male figure that shows a muscular torso slightly turned - might have been lifted from an archaeological ruin." Departing from this reference to classical sculpture, Torso Fragment is hollow and aluminum, reminding a viewer of its modern origins.

== Information ==
Torso Fragment is one of three sculptures by Eskridge on the campus of IUPUI. The other two works are a commissioned fictional bust of the patron saint of nurses, St. Camillus de Lellis, installed in the School of Nursing, and a bust of Dr. Joseph T. Taylor, the first dean of the School of Liberal Arts at IUPUI.

Torso Fragment was created in 2005 for the First Sculpture Invitational. It is located outdoors, just west of Eskenazi Hall.

=== Acquisition ===
Torso Fragment is part of a collection of outdoor sculptures displayed and located on the IUPUI campus. This sculpture was added to the collection in 2005. It was selected for the first Public Sculpture Invitational exhibition hosted by the Herron School of Art and Design, which provided a showcase for the work of “15 artists each represented by a single work.” The exhibit included fifteen public works of art on view outdoors from May 2005 to August 2006. Featured artists included Herron School of Art and Design faculty Katrin Asbury, Greg Hull, and Eric Nordgulen. Other artists included David Bellamy, Barbara Cooper, Tom Otterness, John Ruppert, James Wille Faust, Edward Mayer, Don Gummer, Judith Shea, Casey Eskridge, Wim Delvoye, Tom Sachs, and Arney Nadler. Funds from the Cultural Development Commission, Ruth Lilly, IU New Frontiers Grant Program, and the IUPUI Campus Arts Committee supported the exhibition.

== Artist ==
Casey Eskridge grew up in rural Indiana, the son of a farmer. He spent his time “playing sports and being outdoors”. Eskridge is best known for a “naturalistic approach to the figure, recognizing human imperfections and the character within the figure". Eskridge, who earned his bachelor's degree from the Herron School of Art and Design in 1997 received his Master of Fine Arts degree in 2002 from the Pennsylvania Academy of Fine Arts in Philadelphia, Pennsylvania. He works from his home, a "converted church built in 1873 in the southern Chester County", in Avondale, Pennsylvania, as a professional sculptor.

== See also ==
- Belvedere Torso
- Discobolus
- Venus de Milo
