= East Gate/West Gate =

Public sculpture located on the Indiana University-Purdue University Indianapolis campus

Coordinates: 39°46.438′N 86°10.299′W

- Artist: Sasson Soffer
- Year: 1973
- Type: Stainless Steel Pipe
- Dimensions: 7.3 m × 9.1 m × 12 m (24 ft × 30 ft × 40 ft)
- Location: Indiana University-Purdue University Indianapolis; Indianapolis, Indiana, United States

East Gate/West Gate, a public sculpture by Sasson Soffer, is located on the Indiana University-Purdue University Indianapolis campus, which is near downtown Indianapolis, Indiana. This sculpture is on loan from the Indianapolis Museum of Art and was installed on campus on March 22, 2009. It was transported from the Indianapolis Museum of Art to its current location, in front of University Library, from the Indianapolis Museum of Art via helicopter. East Gate/West Gate was constructed in 1973 and consists of stainless steel pipe. Its dimensions are 24'x 40'x 30' and weighs 840 lbs.

== Information ==
East Gate/West Gate was made by Sasson Soffer in 1973. It is a three-dimensional outdoor sculpture consisting of two spirals welded and bolted together. It is secured to the ground by steel clamps. Four holes were drilled and filled with concrete and then affixed. It is made of stainless steel pipe and is 24' x 40' x 30' in dimension. Installation of this piece occurred on March 22, 2009. It was moved from the Indianapolis Museum of Art and transported via helicopter to its current location on campus in front of the University Library. It is on loan from the Indianapolis Museum of Art until 2011.

== Artist ==
Sasson Soffer (1925- October 17, 2009)

"Sasson Soffer was born in Baghdad, Iraq of a Jewish background. The son of a scribe, Soffer spent much time drawing in his father’s studio. In 1948, the Arab-Israeli war broke out, and after some months in hiding, Soffer escaped to Iran and eventually Israel. Later, Soffer made his way to New York and enrolled in the art program at Brooklyn College, which boasted a faculty that included sculptor José de Rivera and painter Mark Rothko, who became a close friend. In 1961 and 1966 his work was included in Whitney Museum Annuals. Beginning in 1968, Soffer’s sculpture has been seen at Lincoln Center, Battery Park, the Indianapolis Museum of Art, Queens College, Bard College, New York University, Harvard University, Hampshire College, and the Sculpture Park in East Hampton, New York." Biography courtesy Jessica Soffer (excerpted from The New York Times, Christian Science Monitor, Indianapolis Star, and The Maine Times).

Partial listing of exhibitions in which Sasson Soffer participated:

- 1966-New York University, Weinstein Hall, New York (Queen)
- 1970-Hudson River Museum, Yonkers, New York (EM)
- 1973-Wooster Street, New York, New York (Westgate)
- 1974-Harvard University, Cambridge, Massachusetts, Science Center (EM and DEM)
- 1974-Fisher Building, Detroit Michigan (WEM)
- 1974-Wayne State University, Detroit, Michigan (Reunion)
- 1974-Stormking Art Center, Mountainville, New York (Eastgate)
- 1974-Van Saum Park, Paramus, New Jersey (Reunion)
- 1974-Moore College, Philadelphia, Pennsylvania (Ying, Yang)
- 1975-Battery Park, New York, New York (Homage to the Statue of Liberty)
- 1975-Walker Street, New York, New York (Nightwalker)
- 1976-Battery Park, New York, New York (Offering)
- 1978-Beech Street and West Broadway, New York, New York (Immigrant and Migrant)
- 1980-Battery Park, New York, New York (Eastgate-Westgate)

== Location history ==
This sculpture is on loan from the Indianapolis Museum of Art. It was acquired to the Indianapolis Museum of Art by gift from the Alliance of the Indianapolis Museum of Art. It was brought to the museum by truck in 1980. This relocation involved cutting the artwork and re-welding it when it arrived at the IMA. It is currently located in front of University Library on the campus of IUPUI. It was moved from the Indianapolis Museum of Art to its current location on March 22, 2009. It arrived at approximately 6pm and was installed by the IMA with help from the IUPUI Campus Facility Services. Roadways under the flight path of the helicopter were closed briefly which included 10th, Michigan, and New York streets. The flight path followed "the White River from the museum to the Natatorium, and then north to Taylor Hall." Video of its transportation can be found at the IMA's website. Before coming to the IMA East Gate/West Gate was owned by the Storm King Art Center and on display at Battery Park.

== Documentation ==
A Museum Studies course at IUPUI recently undertook the project of researching and reporting on the condition of 40 outdoor sculptures on the university campus. East Gate/West Gate was included in this movement. This documentation was influenced by the successful Save Outdoor Sculpture! 1989 campaign organized by Heritage Preservation: The National Institute of Conservation partnered with the Smithsonian Institution, specifically the Smithsonian American Art Museum. Throughout the 1990s, over 7,000 volunteers nationwide have cataloged and assessed the condition of over 30,000 publicly accessible statues, monuments, and sculptures installed as outdoor public art across the United States.
