= Don Gummer =

American sculptor (born 1946)

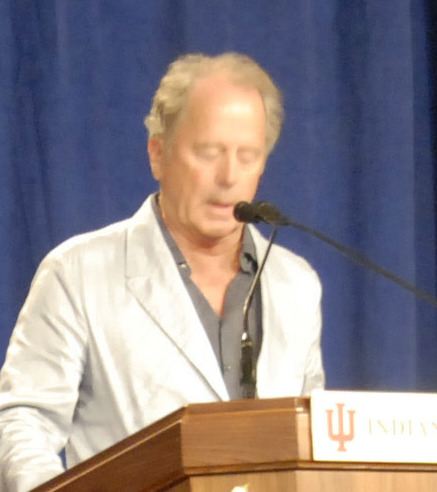
- Gummer in 2011
- Born: Donald James Gummer; December 12, 1946 (age 79); Louisville, Kentucky, U.S.
- Education: Yale University (BFA, MFA)
- Spouses: Peggy Lucas (m. 1967; div. 1974); Meryl Streep (m. 1978; sep. 2017)
- Children: Henry Wolfe; Mamie Gummer; Grace Gummer; Louisa Jacobson
- Relatives: Mark Ronson (son-in-law)
- Website: dongummer.com

Donald James Gummer (born December 12, 1946) is an American sculptor. His early work concentrated on table-top and wall-mounted sculpture. In the mid-1980s, he shifted his focus to large free-standing works, often in bronze. In the 1990s, he added a variety of other materials, such as stainless steel, aluminum and stained glass. His interest in large outdoor works also led him to an interest in public art. He is married to Meryl Streep, although they have been separated since 2017.

== Style ==
Critic Irving Sandler (writing in Art in America, January 2005) has noted that Gummer's work is recognizably rooted in constructivism, but also writes that "in extending and deflecting Constructivist art in a new direction, Gummer has rendered it peculiarly contemporary." Sandler also writes that Gummer's works "give postmodern life to classic principles of abstract composition."

== Early life and education ==
Gummer was born in Louisville, Kentucky, and grew up in Indiana. He is the son of Dorothy Ann (née Jacobson) and William Adolph Gummer, and has five brothers: William, Jack, Richard, Steven, and Mark.

He studied at Ben Davis High School, Indianapolis, and then at the Herron School of Art from 1964 to 1966. From 1966 to 1970, he studied at the School of the Museum of Fine Arts in Boston, Massachusetts, and then completed his studies at the Yale School of Art where he received his Bachelor of Fine Arts (BFA) and Master of Fine Arts (MFA), and studied with David von Schlegell.

== Career ==
Gummer's first solo show was in 1973. Since then, his works have been featured at two dozen solo shows at museums and galleries around the East Coast and Midwest. His work has also been exhibited in group shows.

Gummer's commissioned works have included Primary Compass (2000), a site-specific outdoor permanent sculpture at the Butler Institute of American Art, Youngstown, Ohio, and a sculpture/fountain in Historic New Harmony, New Harmony, Indiana. The Optimist" by Don Gummer was placed at the entrance of the Preston Arts Center, formerly the Henderson Fine Arts Center, on September 30, 2001, in Henderson, Kentucky. The sculpture made of cast stainless steel with a bronze base measures 7 ft. high, 4 ft. deep and 5 ft. in width and is mounted on a six-ton Indiana limestone base. "Fear and hate are no match for love and optimism" . . . Don Gummer . . . from speech at dedication and unveiling ceremony. One stainless steel and stained glass sculpture, Southern Circle, standing 25 feet (7.6 m) tall and weighing approximately 20,000 pounds, was commissioned by the city of Indianapolis and dedicated in October, 2004. "Primary Separation", a permanent installation at the Massachusetts Museum of Contemporary Art, was completed in 2006.

== Personal life ==
Gummer married Peggy Jenel Lucas in 1967, but they divorced shortly after. He married actress Meryl Streep on September 30, 1978. They have four children: musician Henry Wolfe, and actresses Mamie Gummer, Grace Gummer, and Louisa Jacobson. It was reported in October 2023 that Gummer and Streep had been separated for more than six years. They were last seen together in 2018.

Gummer and Streep are active philanthropists who donate to a range of arts organizations and educational institutions, including Vassar College, Opus School in Harlem, and the Silver Mountain Arts Foundation.

== Public collections ==
- The Mattatuck Museum, Waterbury, CT
- The Butler Institute of American Art, Youngstown, Ohio, US
- Chase Manhattan Bank, New York, US
- Chemical Bank, New York, US
- Evansville Museum of Arts, History and Science, Evansville, Indiana, US
- Preston Arts Center, Henderson, Kentucky, US
- The Equitable, New York, US
- Hiroshima Lying-in Hospital, Hiroshima, Japan
- International Creative Management, New York, US
- House of Music (1993) - Kitakyushu International Center, Kitakyushu, Japan
- Louisiana Museum, Humlebaek, Denmark
- McCrory Corporation, New York, US
- Joseph E. Seagram Company, New York, US
- Massachusetts Museum of Contemporary Art, US
- Cyberinfrastructure Building, Indiana University, Bloomington, Indiana, US
- Open Eyes and The South Tower, Indiana University-Purdue University Indianapolis, Indianapolis, Indiana, US
