= Judith Shea =

American sculptor and artist (born 1948)

- Judith Shea, Without Words (1988), Minneapolis Sculpture Garden
- Born: 1948 (age 77–78); Philadelphia, Pennsylvania, United States
- Education: Parsons School of Design
- Known for: Fashion design
- Patrons: 16

Judith Shea is an American sculptor and artist, born in Philadelphia, Pennsylvania, in 1948. She was awarded a degree in fashion design from the Parsons School of Design in 1969 and earned her Bachelor of Fine Arts degree there in 1975. This dual education formed the basis for her figure based works.

Her career has had three distinct phases: the use of cloth and clothing forms from 1974 to 1981; the use of hollow cast metal clothing-figure forms from 1982 until 1991; and the creation of carved full-figure statues made of wood, cloth, clay, foam and hair from 1990 to the present.

== About ==
Her first New York City presentation was at Alanna Heiss's CLOCKTOWER galleries Project Room in April 1976. In a performance based on color theory, she made a full spectrum of sheer silk shirts and pants. Dancer Juliette Shen, changing clothes at Shea's direction, added and subtracted layers, mixing new colors live in the transparent silk. There were five performances over three days. Her work then traveled the country, appearing in museum and art festival exhibits. In the January 1981 Whitney Biennial, Shea showed three simple forms hung on the wall that evoked iconic clothes of her childhood years; a black overcoat, "I LIKE IKE", and 2 simple sheath dresses, "INAUGURAL BALL" and "EXEC. SEC'Y.". Five related works were included in the Hirshhorn’s Directions 83 survey. To Shea these works evoke a human presence through the clothes.

With the support of NEA grants in 1984 and 1986, Shea began casting her figures into iron and bronze, allowing her to work more three dimensionally. The 1986 fellowship also offered a French Exchange, and Shea went to Paris to study the statuary of its parks and gardens. This research led to several hollow-figure compositions from the 1980s designed to be sited in public spaces, such as Eden 1986 (John Hancock Tower, Chicago), Shepherd’s Muse 1988 (Oliver Ranch), Shield 1990 (Sheldon Museum of Art), Without Words 1988 (Walker Art Center), and "Post-Balzac" 1990 (Hirshhorn Museum and Sculpture Garden).

An artist-in-residence in Kutztown, Pennsylvania in 1987, Shea was then engaged for a 1989 residency at Chesterwood—Daniel Chester French’s summer studio in Stockbridge, Mass., where he had worked on his Lincoln Memorial monument. She then began to carve what she termed ironic monuments and statues in wood. A show of these works at Max Protetch Gallery, NY in March 1993 was titled "All About Adam, and Eve". In an article in Art in America Magazine that Spring, author Brooks Adams referred to them as "Shea's Anti-Monuments". Included was a white northern pine equestrian statue of an over-sized, middle aged, white-stained male astride an undersized, over-worked white-stained farm horse. Signifying the end of the cultural tradition of who gets to be the hero in our celebratory monuments, Shea titled the work "No More Monument".

Post-Balzac (1991) by Judith Shea at the Hirshhorn Museum & Sculpture Garden

Following this in 1994 The Public Art Fund sponsored Shea's installation, The Other Monument. This wooden equestrian monument was of a free black man astride a black horse. It was sited at Doris Freedman Plaza at 60th St. and Central Park, directly north of the Civil War era Union Victory Monument of Augustus Saint-Gaudens - a gilded equestrian figure of General William Tecumseh Sherman. Two years previously Shea had been awarded the Saint Gaudens Fellowship. Influenced by her research into his Civil War works, Shea realized that at that time there were no figurative monuments to the other victory of the American Civil War - Emancipation. This was her offering of the missing monument.

Following several fellowships abroad, including a Rockefeller Foundation Residency Bellagio, Italy, The Rome Prize Fellowship the American Academy in Rome, and the Lila Wallace–Reader’s Digest Artist’s Award Residency in Oaxaca, Mexico, Shea began a group of works in 2000 that deal with the figure imagined as character and icon. This work set the stage for the evolution of her next major body of work, which she titled Judith Shea: Legacy Collection. The topic of the Legacy Collection was the artist’s first hand experience of 9/11: She lives very near what became Ground Zero of the World Trade Center site. In this very personal response, Shea fashioned a group of mannequin-like figures, as if placed in the windows of the Brooks Brothers store just across from the site on that Tuesday. They are looking skyward, elegant in gray felt, covered in dust and debris. About them Shea has written, "I was struck by this unique juxtaposition, the sleek image of Success - American Style, opposite this spectacular attempt to topple it, with just the unbroken shop window between themz'. Several works from the Legacy Collection series have been acquired by the Yale University Art Gallery in New Haven.

In 2012, Shea curated an exhibition at the invitation of The National Academy Museum. From their Collection she chose portraits and self-portraits of female members of the Academy from 1858 to 1971. In a video tour of the exhibit, titled "Her Own Style: An Artist's Eye With Judith Shea", Shea interpreted what she saw as the very personal self description that each woman made in her self-portrait. Telling what mattered to her as an artist and how she wanted to be viewed in history. Shea made additional sculptural portraits for the show of three of her favorite figurative sculptors - "Louise Monument" (Bourgeois), "Elizabeth Tribute" (Catlett) and "Marisol".

== Awards ==
- 2013 ARTS AND LETTERS AWARD IN ART: American Academy of Arts and Letters, New York, NY
- 2013 AWARD FOR EXCELLENCE: The 2013 Annual Exhibition; National Academy Museum, New York, NY
- 2012 GUGGENHEIM FELLOW in Fine Arts; The John Simon Guggenheim Memorial Foundation, New York, NY
- 2011 ANONYMOUS WAS A WOMAN AWARD; New York, NY
- 2011 ARTISTS’ LEGACY FOUNDATION 2011 ARTIST AWARD; Oakland, CA
- 2007 CHARLOTTE DUNWIDDIE PRIZE for SCULPTURE; National Academy Museum, New York, NY
- 1995 ARTS INTERNATIONAL-LILA WALLACE READER’S DIGEST: International Artist Award; Oaxaca, Mexico
- 1994 ROME PRIZE FELLOWSHIP: Trustees Award, American Academy in Rome
- 1993 FELLOW of the AUGUSTUS SAINT-GAUDENS MEMORIAL; National Historic Site; Home and studio of Augustus Saint-Gaudens
- 1993 ROCKEFELLER FOUNDATION RESIDENT FELLOWSHIP, Bellagio Study Center, Bellagio, Italy
- 1992 CERTIFICATE OF SERVICE: For Outstanding Volunteer Service with the Artist-and-Homeless Collaborative; City of New York, Human Resources Administration
- 1989 The GUGGENHEIM MUSEUM SCULPTOR in RESIDENCE at CHESTERWOOD; A National Historic Trust Property; Stockbridge, MA
- 1986 NATIONAL ENDOWMENT for the ARTS: Individual Artist Fellowship in Sculpture; US/France Exchange
- 1984 NATIONAL ENDOWMENT for the ARTS: Individual Artist Fellowship in Sculpture

== Collections ==
Shea's work is included in the following public collections:

- Yale University Art Gallery
- Hirshhorn Museum and Sculpture Garden in Washington, D.C.
- Museum of Modern Art in New York City
- Nelson-Atkins Museum of Art in Kansas City
- Whitney Museum of American Art in New York
- Walker Art Center in Minneapolis, Minnesota
- NATIONAL GALLERY in Washington, D.C. (Herbert & Dorothy Vogel Collection)
- MCASD in San Diego, CA
- Santa Barbara Museum of Art in Santa Barbara, CA
- Sheldon Memorial Art Gallery University of Nebraska in Lincoln, NE
- Weatherspoon Art Museum UNC Greensboro in Greensboro, NC
- Addison Gallery Phillips Academy in Andover, MA
- Albright-Knox Gallery in Buffalo, NY
- Brooklyn Museum in Brooklyn, NY
- Des Moines Art Center in Des Moines, IA (John and Mary Pappajohn Sculpture Park)
- Laumeier Sculpture Park in St. Louis, MO
