= DXA Studio =

American architecture firm

Practice information
- Firm type: Architecture firm
- Founders: Jordan Rogove, Wayne Norbeck
- Founded: 2011
- Location: New York, NY
- Coordinates: 40.746752°N 73.989593°W

Significant works and honors
- Buildings: William Ulmer Brewery Conversion

Website
- Official website

DXA Studio is an American architecture firm based in New York City and known for its work on the conversion of the William Ulmer Brewery in Brooklyn and the design of The Rowan Astoria, a residential development in Queens that set a record in 2021 for the most expensive condominium unit sold in the borough.

== History ==
Founded in 2011 by Jordan Rogove and Wayne Norbeck, DXA studio emphasizes authenticity, sustainability, and originality in architecture.

In 2022, DXA Studio released its first monograph, DXA NYC: 10 Years of Building on History, published by ORO. The book explores DXA’s practice through 14 projects that consider New York City as a laboratory, embracing history as a constructive and critical influence. The book also includes writing by Gregory Rogove, Russell Shorto and Judith Zilczer.

Maverick Chelsea, located in Manhattan's Chelsea neighborhood, is the firm’s largest project to date. Opened in 2022, it features two side-by-side towers with a faceted column and spandrel grid façade, with condo and rental units, including affordable housing under the NYC Inclusionary Housing and Fair Housing Acts. In 2022, Justin Davidson of New York Magazine sought the firm's expertise for potential renovation ideas for the imperiled West-Park Presbyterian Church at 165 86th Street. DXA Studio proposed three options that preserved as much of the core structure as possible and added new apartments with a façade respecting the neighborhood context.

In 2023, the firm completed The Labs on 121, a life science building in Harlem, New York, and 110 North 1st Street, a residential project in Williamsburg, Brooklyn rooted in health and wellness.

The Rowan Astoria, designed by DXA Studio, is one of the largest residential projects in Astoria, Queens and has also set records for condominium sales in the area. The six-story building consists of 16-unit condos attached to a glass lobby with a green roof surrounded by a landscaped entrance plaza and private garden. The façade features intricate masonry.

Other restoration and renovation projects by DXA Studio include the landmark William Ulmer Brewery restoration in Bushwick, New York - originally designed by renowned architect Theobald Engelhardt, DXA Studio transformed it into a new commercial and manufacturing center; 827-831 Broadway, a 70,000 SF commercial building in lower Manhattan, once Willem de Kooning’s former studio space - DXA Studio restored the original 1890s cast-iron façade and design a new vertical enlargement that celebrates the cultural significance of the building; 49 Greene Street in SoHo’s Cast-Iron District, the Mt. Pleasant Baptist Church conversion on West 81st Street.

== See also ==
- List of architecture firms
