= DXA (disambiguation) =

DXA may refer to:

- Dual-energy X-ray absorptiometry, a diagnostic test for bone mineral density testing
- Dextrallorphan, a chemical compound
- DXA Studio, an American architecture firm
