= Kerry Brougher =

American museum curator

- Occupations: Museum director and curator
- Known for: Academy Museum of Motion Pictures, Hirshhorn Museum and Sculpture Garden, Modern Art Oxford, Museum of Contemporary Art, Los Angeles

Kerry Brougher is the founding director of the Academy Museum of Motion Pictures in Los Angeles, California. He has served as curator at several museums, most recently as the curator and acting director of the Hirshhorn Museum and Sculpture Garden in Washington DC.

From 1983 to 1997, Brougher served as a curator at the Museum of Contemporary Art in Los Angeles during which he was responsible for several exhibitions, mostly notably "Jeff Wall" and "Hall of Mirrors: Art and Film since 1945". The latter exhibit featured works by Martin Scorsese and Stanley Kubrick among others.

From 1997 to 2000, Brougher served as the director of the Museum of Modern Art (now Modern Art Oxford) in Oxford, England. His most notable work at Oxford was on Alfred Hitchcock and he later (2001) wrote the book Notorious-: Alfred Hitchcock and Contemporary Art.

Brougher was curator at the Hirshhorn for nine years beginning in 2000. During that time, he served as chief curator, director of arts and programs, deputy director, and acting director. In 2005, he co-curated (with the Museum of Contemporary Art in Los Angeles) a significant survey on synaesthesia called "Visual Music" and was noted for "The Cinema Effect: Illusion, Reality and the Moving Image" exhibition that used media, film, and video which covered Runa Islam, Steve McQueen, Paul Chan, and other artists. Among other unusual techniques was his use of a 360-degree video projection for the exterior of the iconic cylindrical Hirshhorn to display Song 1 by the artist Doug Aitken. His final exhibition at the Hirshhorn was the mixed-media project "Damage Control". His last promotion at the Hirshhorn occurred in 2007 when Brougher was named acting director after Olga Viso stepped down.
