= Kiepenkerl =

Sculptures by Albert Mazzotti Jr and Jeff Koons

Kiepenkerl – 1953 statue
- Artist: Albert Mazzotti Jr (re-creating the destroyed 1896 original by August Schmiemann)
- Year: 1953
- Type: Bronze
- Dimensions: 175 cm (69 in)
- Location: Kiepenkerl Square, Münster, Germany
- Owner: City of Münster

Kiepenkerl – 1987 statue
- Artist: Jeff Koons
- Year: 1987
- Type: Stainless steel, cast and polished
- Dimensions: 184.8 cm × 80.0 cm × 81.9 cm (72 3/4 in × 31 1/2 in × 32 1/4 in)
- Location: Hirshhorn Museum and Sculpture Garden; Washington, D.C., United States
- Owner: Smithsonian Institution

Kiepenkerl was originally a sandstone statue of a travelling merchant created by August Schmiemann in Münster, Germany, in 1896. Destroyed in World War II, it was re-created in cast metal by Albert Mazzotti Jr in 1953. The statue now stands in a small square in the Old Quarter of Münster. In 1987 American sculptor Jeff Koons created a replica of the design in polished cast stainless steel.

== 1896 statue ==
The original statue, like its successors, depicted a Kiepenkerl (literally "pannier guy": a travelling merchant or pedlar [US: peddler]) with a carrying basket, whistle, knot stick and linen smock. It was carved from Baumberger sandstone by August Schmiemann and was inaugurated in Münster on 16 October 1896. The statue was destroyed by a US tank in World War II.

== 1953 statue ==
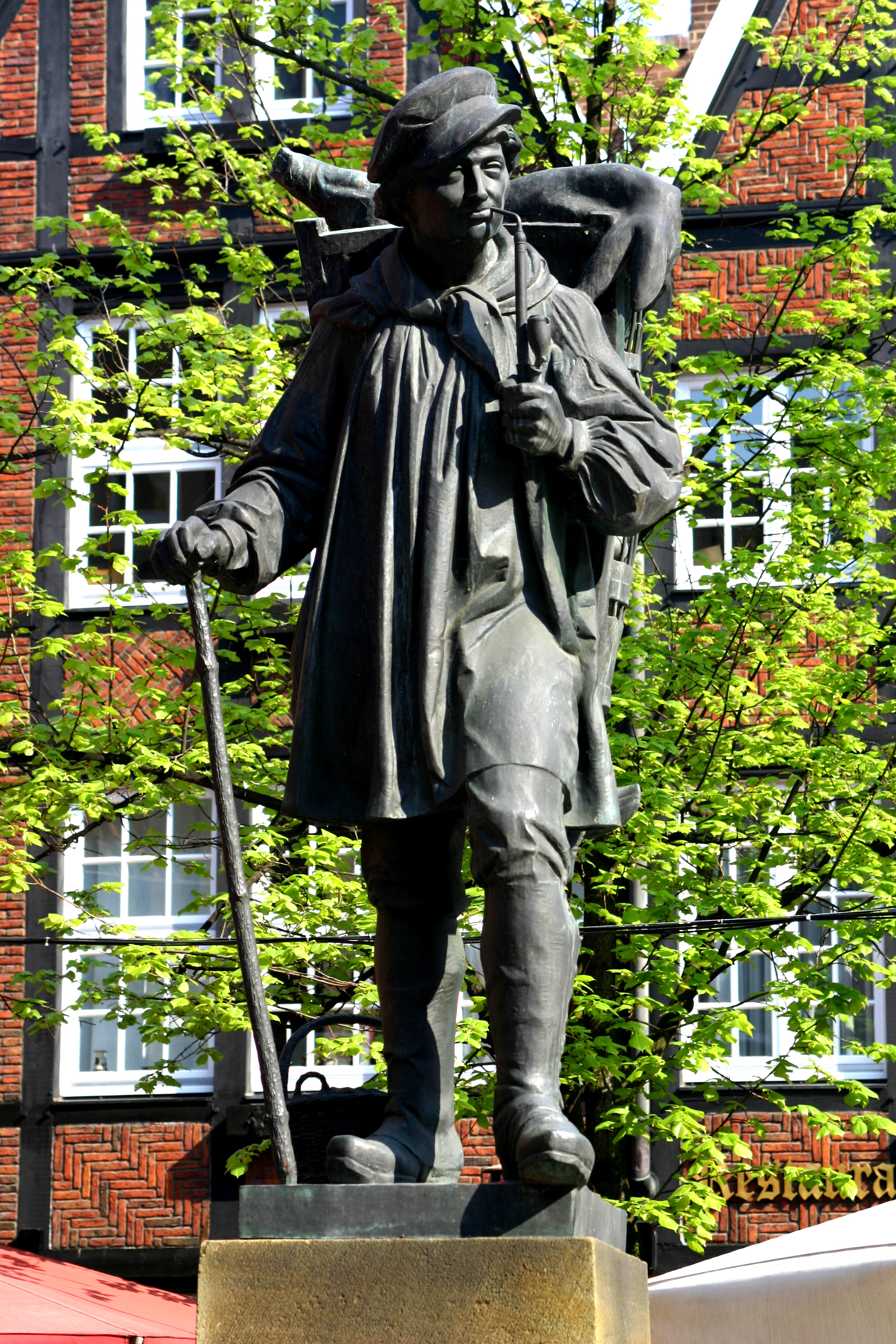
Albert Mazzotti Jr's 1953 re-creation of the 1896 Kiepenkerl statue by August Schmiemann that was destroyed in World War II

A competition for a new statue was held immediately after the war ended. However, the new designs were vetoed by the mayor of Münster, Karl Zuhorn. Subsequently, Albert Mazzotti Jr was commissioned to create a statue in bronze. It was inaugurated on 20 September 1953 by Federal President Theodor Heuss. Its location is Kiepenkerl Square, in the Old Quarter of Münster (51°57′51″N 7°37′34″E).

== 1987 statue ==
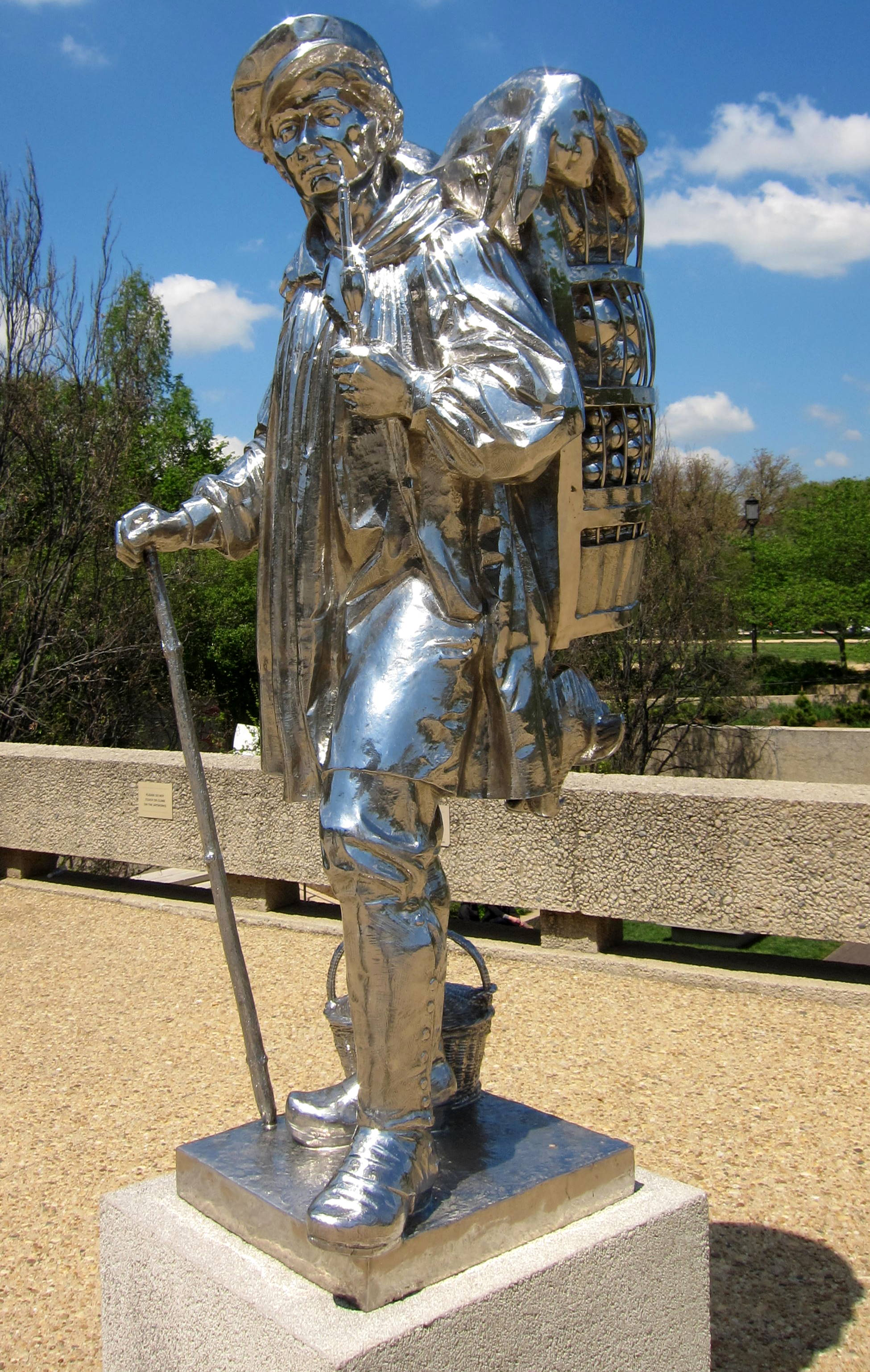
The 1987 replica of the Kiepenkerl statue by Jeff Koons

For the 1987 Sculpture Projects Münster, American sculptor Jeff Koons created a replica of the statue in polished cast stainless steel. Koons produced an edition of three; one is on display at the Hirshhorn Museum and Sculpture Garden in Washington, D.C. (38°53.329′N 77°1.380′W).

The guide for the Sculpture Projects Münster includes these notes by Georg Jappe:

The Kiepenkerl monument symbolizes the man who comes to town with a few eggs, potatoes, and rabbits in his "Kiepe" (a huge basket carried on the back). Actually he is a "Kötter" (a tenant farmer). The statue, created by an academic sculptor, became especially popular when, during the war, everything was burnt down, only the statue remained standing and then was blasted by a tank crew. The will to survive during the hoarding times: as early as 1953, the city of Münster still in ruins, Theodor Heuss inaugurated a new life-size Kiepenkerl monument in bronze.

Bronze is art. That is the only art in this restoration monument. Jeff Koons now has recast it in stainless steel which he calls the "material of the masses" (a highly complicated procedure: as the form does not correspond to any industrial standard, the various parts had to be smelted at 1800 degrees Centigrade and cast one by one and then welded together) and finally gave it a high mirror polish to create a "false front of luxury".

== See also ==
- List of public art in Washington, D.C., Ward 2
