= Wish Tree for Washington, DC =

Artwork by Yoko Ono

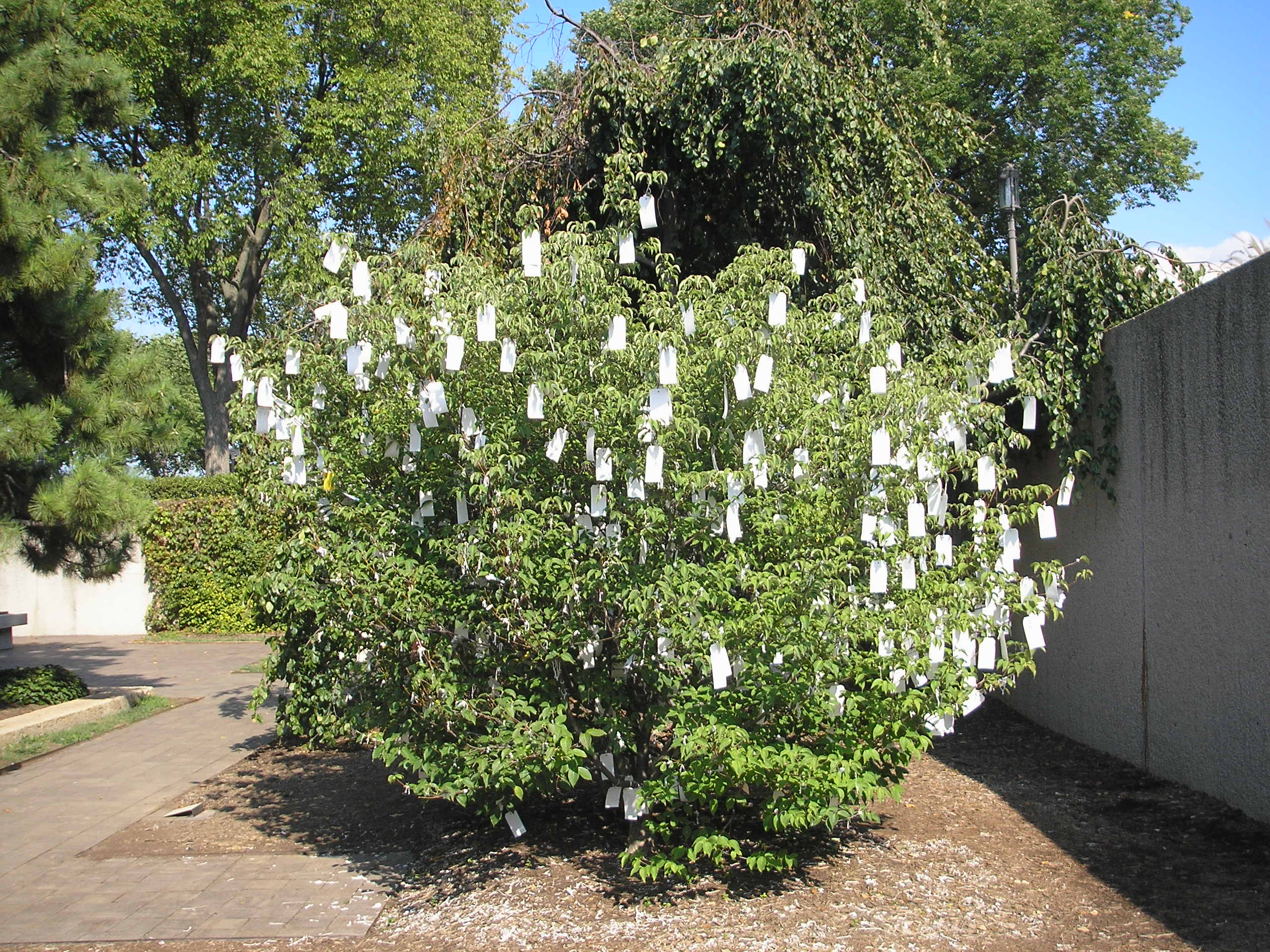
- Artist: Yoko Ono
- Year: 2007
- Type: Live tree and mixed media
- Location: Hirshhorn Museum and Sculpture Garden, Washington, D.C., United States
- Owner: Smithsonian Institution

Wish Tree for Washington, DC is a public art work by Yoko Ono.

As a part of her Imagine Peace billboard project, it was installed in the Hirshhorn Museum and Sculpture Garden on April 2, 2007, during the 2007 National Cherry Blossom Festival, as one of ten in the city and is part of the museum's permanent collection.

In 2010, a wish tree was installed at the Museum of Modern Art in New York City.

Paper is provided for the visitor to tie a wish to the tree. The work builds on the Japanese tradition of tying prayers to trees. Returning the paper back to its source evokes an offering.

== See also ==
- List of public art in Washington, D.C., Ward 2
