= Last Conversation Piece =

- Artist: Juan Muñoz
- Year: 1994–1995
- Type: Bronze
- Dimensions: 169 cm × 620 cm × 820 cm (66.5 in × 244 in × 321 in)
- Location: Hirshhorn Museum and Sculpture Garden; Washington, D.C., United States; 38°53′16.95″N 77°1′24.42″W
- Owner: Smithsonian Institution

Last Conversation Piece is a public artwork by Spanish sculptor Juan Muñoz in the collection of the Hirshhorn Museum and Sculpture Garden in Washington, DC, United States. The piece is currently on loan to The Contemporary Austin.

== Description ==
This sculpture consists of three pieces which display five figures with bulbous bodies (reminiscent of punching bags). Three are huddled together having a conversation, while two are at opposite ends of the space, moving towards the three in conversation. The three figures seem almost violent in their discussion while the two who rush towards them show concern. They are placed on a grassy area of the sculpture garden.

== Gallery ==
Front

Detail

Label

== Acquisition ==
The sculpture was originally on display at the Marian Goodman Gallery in New York City up until April 13, 1995. The piece was a museum purchase made the same year and was put on display in March 1996. In 2019, the Hirshhorn loaned the sculpture to The Contemporary Austin. It went on exhibition in November of that year.

== Information ==
Last Conversation Piece served as the final in his "conversation piece" series. Muñoz became weary of the series and chose to expand out in styles as a protest of being lumped into a single sculptural genre.

== See also ==
- List of public art in Washington, D.C., Ward 2
