= Richard Koshalek =

- Born: 1942 (age 83–84)
- Education: University of Minnesota
- Occupation: Art museum director
- Years active: 1980–2013
- Employers: Museum of Contemporary Art, Los Angeles (MOCA); ArtCenter College of Design; Hirshhorn Museum and Sculpture Garden
- Known for: Art museum leadership, architectural commissions

Richard Koshalek is an American art museum director, having been the director of the Hirhshorn Museum and Sculpture Garden and the Museum of Contemporary Art, Los Angeles.

== Early life ==
He was born in 1942 and earned a bachelor's degree in architecture in 1965 and a master's degree in art history in 1968 from the University of Minnesota

== Career ==
He served as director of The Museum of Contemporary Art, Los Angeles from 1980 to 2007. He was also president of Art Center College of Design in Pasadena, California, from 1999 until January 2009. At both institutions, he was noted for his commitment to new artistic initiatives, including commissioned works, scholarly exhibitions and publications, and the building of new facilities that garnered architectural acclaim. He worked with architect Frank Gehry on the design and construction of MOCA's Geffen Contemporary (1983), a renovated warehouse popularly known as the Temporary Contemporary. He also worked with the Japanese architect Arata Isozaki on the museum's permanent home in Los Angeles (1986). Koshalek then became the director of the Hirshorn and resigned in 2013 after the Bloomberg Bubble controversy.

=== Bloomberg Bubble ===
In 2009, Koshalek announced that an inflatable structure would be erected over the Hirshhorn's central plaza to create a new public space. The Seasonal Inflatable Structure, to be called the "Bloomberg Bubble," was due to be erected in 2013 and would be inflated annually for one two-month period. It was supposed to create a 14,000-square-foot space for performance and lectures. Designed by Diller Scofidio + Renfro, the proposal won a progressive architecture award from Architect magazine.

Hirshhorn officials began reconsidering the Bubble in 2013. Construction cost estimates for the structure more than tripled to $15.5 million from $5 million, and no major gifts for the project were received between 2010 and May 2013. A Hirshhorn study also concluded that the cost of programming (such as symposia and special events) using the Bubble were likely to run a $2.8 million annual deficit. The Hirshhorn's board of directors evenly split on a vote to proceed with the project in May 2013. In the wake of the vote, seen as a referendum on his leadership, museum director Richard Koshalek announced he would resign by the end of 2013. Constance Caplan, chair of the museum's board of trustees, resigned on July 8, 2013. She cited what the Washington Post characterized as "a board, a museum and the larger Smithsonian Institution at a crossroads, roiled by a lack of transparency, trust, vision and good faith". Four of the board's 15 members resigned between June 2012 and April 2013, and three more (including Caplan) in May, June and July 2013.
