= Juan Muñoz (sculptor) =

Spanish sculptor (1953–2001)

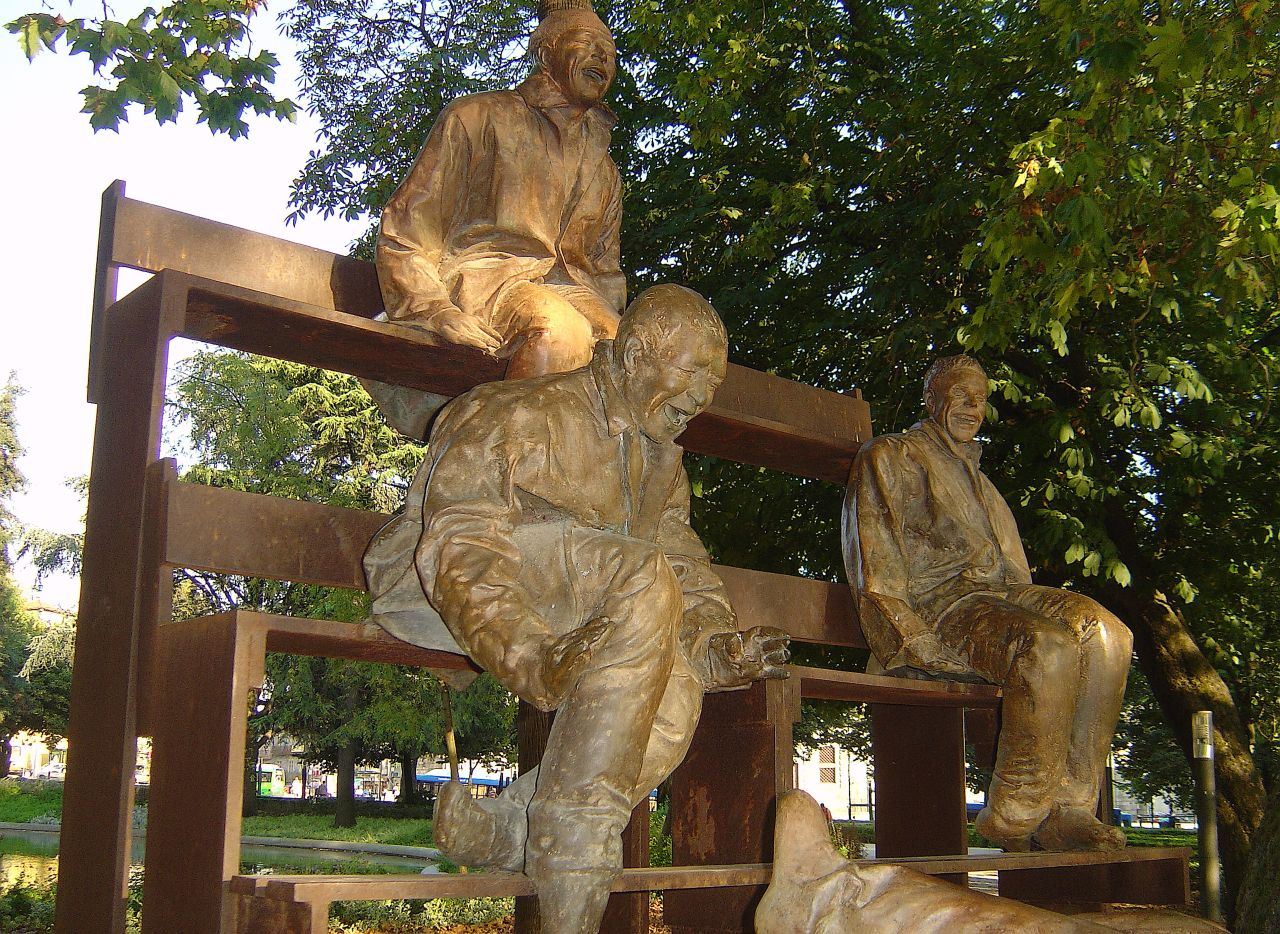
- Thirteen Laughing at Each Other (2001), Jardim da Cordoaria, Porto
- Born: 17 June 1953; Madrid, Spain
- Died: 28 August 2001 (aged 48); Santa Eulària des Riu, Ibiza, Spain
- Occupations: Sculptor, radio script writer
- Spouse: Cristina Iglesias

Juan Muñoz (17 June 1953 – 28 August 2001) was a Spanish sculptor, working primarily in papier-mâché, resin and bronze. He was also interested in the auditory arts and created compositions for the radio. He was a self-described "storyteller". In 2000 he was awarded Spain's Premio Nacional de Artes Plásticas; he died suddenly the following year, aged 48.

== Early life and education ==
Juan Muñoz was born in 1953 into a prosperous, educated family in Madrid, the second of seven children. He grew up under Franco's repressive regime. He enrolled in a local school but became bored and was expelled, so his father retained a poet who was also an art critic to provide lessons, which gave Muñoz an awareness of modernism. He briefly studied architecture in Madrid before leaving for London at seventeen, around 1970, and later received a British Council scholarship to study printmaking. He studied at Croydon College and the Central School of Art and Design. In 1982 he was awarded a Fulbright scholarship to study printmaking at the Pratt Institute in New York City, where he met Richard Serra; he also spent time assisting the Italian sculptor Mario Merz. He spoke an idiosyncratic English, learned from his experience as a waiter in New York restaurants.

After returning to Spain in 1982 or 1983, Muñoz set up a studio. He later recalled buying a couple of cement garden statues from a local maker of lions and other ornaments, then cutting and destroying parts of them to make a work of his own. He said he envied the man's conviction that he was a sculptor while he himself "was spending years trying to make sculpture and couldn't figure out how to do it. So I took part of his language and destroyed it in order to formulate my own language." The balcony sculptures followed soon after.

== Career ==
In 1983 Muñoz organized the exhibition La imagen del animal in Madrid, which included one of his own works. His first solo exhibition, Juan Muñoz: Últimos trabajos, followed at the Fernando Vijande gallery in Madrid in November 1984, and his work was soon exhibited across Europe and elsewhere. He had solo shows at the Lisson Gallery in London in 1987 and 1989, and in 1990 at the Arnolfini in Bristol, with Vertical Balcony Too. In the early 1990s he began making smaller-than-life-size figures arranged in interaction with one another, often inviting viewers to feel they had become part of the work.

In 1996 Muñoz made A Place Called Abroad at the Dia Center for the Arts in New York (26 September 1996 – 29 June 1997). He transformed the 7,500 square feet (700 m^{2}) fourth-floor gallery into a fictional street, cutting diagonally through the existing walls, and populated the residual spaces with groups of figures; fragments of the original rooms remained visible throughout. The street's doorways and windows were adapted from buildings in the surrounding Chelsea neighbourhood. The New York Times described "a gray-stuccoed shuttered street that has been cut diagonally through the galleries, twisting and turning toward increasingly private spaces", inhabited by nearly life-size male figures.

In June 2001 his installation Double Bind, the second commission in the Unilever Series, opened in the Turbine Hall of Tate Modern in London. It was on view when he died. A mid-career retrospective was already planned at the Hirshhorn Museum and Sculpture Garden in Washington, D.C. It opened on 18 October 2001 as his first full survey in the United States, and then toured to Chicago, Houston and Los Angeles. For it Muñoz made Figure Hanging from One Foot (2001), a 550-pound bronze figure suspended upside down on a guywire three storeys above the museum's circular fountain.

== Work ==
His slate-grey or wax-coloured monochrome figures lack individuality, and that absence questions the viewer, sometimes to the point of discomfort. In addition to sculpture, Muñoz made works for the radio. The best known is A Man in a Room, Gambling (1992), made with the British composer Gavin Bryars: ten vignettes of about five minutes each, in which Muñoz explains card tricks over Bryars's music. It was produced by Artangel and has been broadcast by radio stations around the world. His radio play Will It Be a Likeness?, written with John Berger, won a best play award on German radio in 1996.

His last radio work, A Registered Patent: A Drummer Inside a Rotating Box, was written with Alberto Iglesias in 2001 as a text in the form of a legal patent for a box containing a miniature percussionist, to be voiced by John Malkovich. It was intended to be performed at Tate Modern to close Double Bind, but was left unfinished at Muñoz's death. Iglesias and Malkovich completed it as a radio piece, released on CD in 2002, and it was performed live on the bridge over the Turbine Hall on 27 April 2008 to close the Tate's Muñoz retrospective.

== Philosophy ==
Muñoz saw his work as an extension of the illusion of space that painting had developed since the Renaissance, which sculpture had largely lacked. Against Frank Stella's remark "What you see is what you see", he said, "For me, what you see is not what it seems to be." He accepted being called a storyteller and a trickster. He likened a sculpture to a sleight-of-hand trick, which needs the spectator in front, and said he directed viewers through his installations so that they would see "the wonder of it" and not the mechanism, though he described himself as "against interactive approaches to modern art". He spoke of "effect" rather than theatricality, saying he had rarely been to the theatre. He described his figures as being like Pirandello's characters, "more in search of an author", and as "a mirror that cannot reflect", telling viewers something about their looking without letting them see themselves. He did not consider himself a postmodernist, saying, "I have no critique. I am perfectly embedded in the same history that the modernist artists are." He also acknowledged a muted violence in the work, connected to his own memory. For years he carried a switchblade in his pocket, touching it as an expression of "an inner violence", until he found the habit "a little neurotic" and replaced it with a deck of cards. In the radio programme Third Ear (1992), he proposed that the present and death cannot be represented, and can only be reached through their absence.

== Personal life and death ==
In London Muñoz met his wife, the sculptor Cristina Iglesias. They had two children, Lucía and Diego. His marriage also made him the brother-in-law of the Academy Award-nominated film composer Alberto Iglesias. On being awarded the Premio Nacional in 2000, he said, "I think I'll buy a watch."

Muñoz died suddenly on 28 August 2001, aged 48, at a summer house in Santa Eulària des Riu, Ibiza. An autopsy found the cause to be an aneurysm of the oesophagus, which caused a massive internal haemorrhage and cardiac arrest.

== Legacy ==
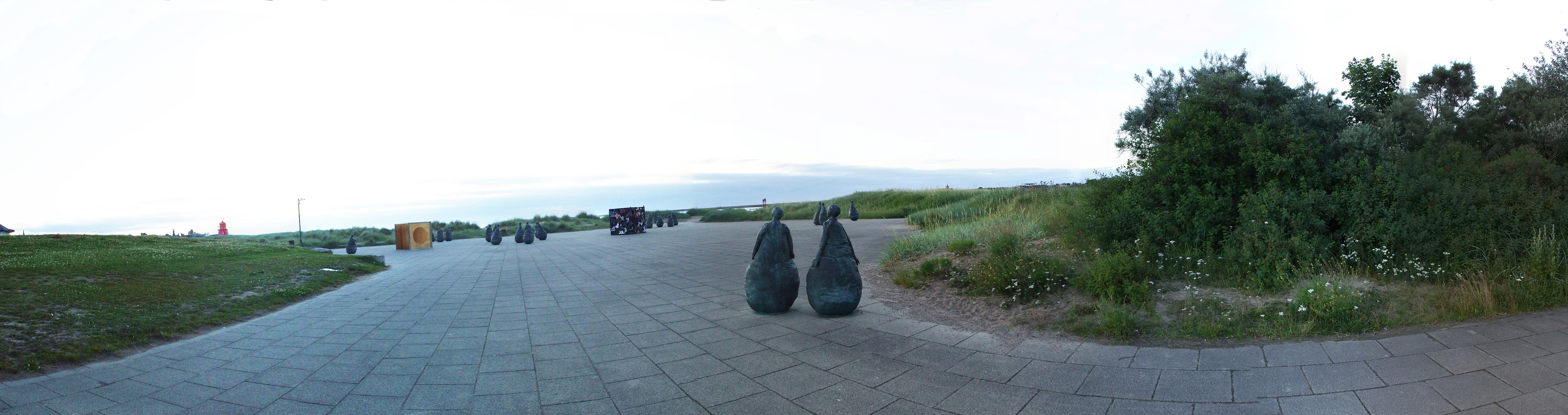
Muñoz's Conversation Piece (1999) at Little Haven beach, South Shields

He has been called "the most significant of the first generation of artists to achieve maturity in post-Franco Spain, and one of the most complex and individual artists working today." His works are held by the Guggenheim Museum Bilbao, the Guggenheim Museum in New York, the Hirshhorn Museum and Sculpture Garden in Washington D.C., the Art Institute of Chicago and Tate Modern in London, and the Hood Museum of Art acquired Figure Hanging from One Foot in 2002.

== See also ==
- Last Conversation Piece

== Bibliography ==
- Berger J. & Wagstaff S., Juan Muñoz: A Retrospective, Tate Publishing, 2008
- Benezra N. & Viso O. M., Juan Muñoz, University of Chicago Press, 2001, ISBN 0-226-04290-1
