= William Ulmer Brewery =

Industrial buildings in Brooklyn, New York

- William Ulmer Brewery Complex
- U.S. National Register of Historic Places
- New York State Register of Historic Places
- New York City Landmark
- William Ulmer Brewery, late 19th century

- Location within New York City Location within New York Location within the United States
- Location: 71-83 Beaver Street, 31-47 Belvidere Street, and 26-28 Locust Street, Brooklyn, New York, US
- Coordinates: 40°41′57″N 73°56′12″W
- Area: 0.58 acres (0.23 ha)
- Built: 1872–1890
- Architects: Theobald Engelhardt and Frederick Wunder
- Architectural style: German round-arch style
- NRHP reference No.: 100009930
- NYSRHP No.: 04701.015557, 04701.015558, 04701.020668
- NYCL No.: 2280

Significant dates
- Added to NRHP: February 20, 2024
- Designated NYSRHP: December 5, 2023
- Designated NYCL: May 10, 2010

The William Ulmer Brewery is a brewery complex in the Bushwick neighborhood of Brooklyn in New York City. It consists of four buildings—an office, a brew house, an engine–machine house, and a stable–storage house—all constructed between 1872 and 1890 in the German round-arch style. The site is bounded by Belvidere Street to the southeast, Beaver Street to the northeast, and Locust Street to the northwest, with the address 31 Belvidere Street. The main brew house, the engine–machine house, and the office building were designed by Brooklyn architect Theobald Engelhardt, while the stable–storage house was designed by Frederick Wunder.

The Ulmer Brewery was one of over a dozen German-operated breweries that were built in Bushwick during the late 19th and early 20th centuries. Following the construction of the original building in 1872, additional structures were completed in 1880, 1885, and 1890. It ceased to be an active brewery in 1920 due to Prohibition in the United States, which outlawed alcoholic beverage production. The Ulmer family continued to own the office building until 1952; the other buildings were sold and used for light manufacturing, and the office building became a private residence. The brewery was named a New York City designated landmark in 2010, becoming the first brewery in the city to receive this status. The buildings were added to the National Register of Historic Places in 2024.

== History ==
=== Context ===
Brewing was a major industry in New York City going back to the 18th century. though early development of breweries in Brooklyn was quite slow, with relatively few commercial brewers. When freshwater was discovered under northern Brooklyn during the late 19th century, including under Williamsburg and Bushwick, resulted in the development of breweries, where many German immigrants worked at the time. By the 1870s and 1880s, there were more than 30 breweries in Brooklyn. Some of these were located within a 14-block "brewer's row" within Bushwick that contained at least 11 breweries. This coincided with a large increase in Germans settling Bushwick.

William Ulmer (1833–1907), an immigrant from the German territory of Württemberg, was one of the early settlers in the Bushwick brewery district. He was the nephew of both John F. Betz and Henry Clausen Sr., who in turn were brewers and apprentices of D.G. Yuengling Sr. In 1871, Ulmer and a Bavarian immigrant named Anton Vigelius founded the Vigelius & Ulmer Continental Lagerbier Brewery, at the intersection of Belvidere (formerly Ann) and Beaver streets. Two years prior, Vigelius had bought the land from the Debevoises, and just before the brewery was constructed, had sold off his half-stake in the land to Ulmer.

=== Operations ===
Construction was already underway by 1871, when an accident at the site killed one construction worker and injured two more. The first buildings on the site, the brewery and a nearby residence, are thought to have been completed by either 1871 or 1872. The brewery was fairly successful, and in 1875 the Brooklyn Daily Eagle described the Vigelius & Ulmer brewery as one of the larger breweries in the Williamsburg area, out of 30 or 40 breweries operating in the neighborhood. Vigelius then relinquished his ownership stake in the brewery. Ulmer became its sole proprietor and subsequently reorganized it into the William Ulmer Brewery. In 1881, some workers went on strike to protest low wages.

Over the years, several improvements were made to the brewery to accommodate additional brewing capacity and to utilize advances in that industry. Ulmer obtained land at Locust and Beaver streets from the family of Elizabeth Debevoise in 1880, and he built the new storage house there soon afterward. In 1885, Theobald Engelhardt designed an expansion, which included an office building; machine and boiler structures; and a washroom and keg-filling room in the back of the main brewery building. According to the Brooklyn Daily Eagle, the 1885 expansion cost $15,000. The Eagle stated in 1886 that the counting-houses at Ulmer Brewery and several others in the area were "not surpassed by anything of the kind on Broadway or Wall Street". Frederick Wunder designed a three-story brick stable and storage house in 1890, which replaced the wooden stable building already on the site. In 1897, Wunder submitted plans to replace the storage house's wood frame with cast iron columns.

By 1896, Ulmer was described as a millionaire, and he lived at a large estate on Bushwick Avenue. With income from the brewery, Ulmer was able to acquire several pieces of real estate, although there is no documentation to support that Ulmer operated any beer gardens to sell his beer. Ulmer operated several facilities including Ulmer Park in Gravesend; Dexter Park in Woodhaven, Queens; and a beer pavilion in Forest Park, Queens. In 1898, he built an ice-manufacturing plant in the town of Greenport, New York. According to a 1909 magazine article, the Greenport plant was capable of producing 10 short tons (8.9 long tons; 9.1 t) of artificial ice each day throughout the year.

When Ulmer retired in 1900, the company was reincorporated with his son-in-law John W. Weber (1858–1933) as its president. Weber, as well as Ulmer's wife Catherine and his other son-in-law John F. Becker, served as directors of the newly reincorporated company. The firm was listed as having $550,000 in capital stock. Additions continued through the 1900s, including a 236-barrel container for cooking the brew, installed in 1906. The container, designed by Frank Stanley, was so large that part of the floor had to be cut out to accommodate it. When Ulmer died in 1907, the brewery had become one of Brooklyn's largest. The brewery had produced 3,200,000 US gallons (12,000,000 L) of beer a year at its peak. By the early 20th century, though, other breweries with larger and more complex machinery had been developed.

=== Post-closure ===
After the enactment of Prohibition, production of alcoholic beverages became illegal, so the brewery closed in 1920. After closure, the brewery's buildings were sold and used for light manufacturing. The stable–storage building was sold in 1921 and was acquired c. 1923 by the Artcraft Metal Stamping Company, a lighting company that used the structure as a manufacturing facility until 1940. The main brew house was sold in 1922 and was acquired in 1923 by Marcus Leavitt, who renovated it and replaced the courtyard behind the building with a parking garage. The brew house was then sold in 1924 to another firm, and both the main brew house and the stable–storage building were resold multiple times in the 20th century, being used by various manufacturing firms. The Ulmer family continued to own the office building before selling it in 1952. The main brew house received a new sprinkler system, fire escapes, and exit doors in the 1950s. The Twenty Starr Street Corporation bought the office structure in 1962.

In 1985, Jay Swift, a stone sculptor and marble worker, purchased the office building and renovated it. Swift recalled that "the first time I rode my bike down that street and saw that building, I almost fell over", but that the structure was also beset with leaks, broken glass, and dilapidated interiors. At the time, the main brew house was used as a storage facility for a nearby lamp company. Swift moved out in the late 1990s, and the office building remained unoccupied for several years, as Swift had declined potential tenants who wanted to make extensive changes to the exterior. The stable–storage building was converted to an apartment building in 2002. By 2008, The New York Times mentioned that a furniture designer lived on the first floor of the office building. On May 11, 2010, the New York City Landmarks Preservation Commission designated the brewery an official city landmark, making it the first brewery to receive this status. At the time of the landmark decision, the office building was still being used as a home.

Travis Stabler of the Rivington Company acquired the three buildings next to Swift's house in 2018 for $14 million. Stabler had planned to redesign the structure, adding a penthouse above one of the buildings. These plans were truncated due to a lack of demand caused by the COVID-19 pandemic. By 2020, the residence was on sale for $4 million. At the time, the structure had been separated into two ownership units, each covering one story. The same year, G4 Capital Partners lent $10 million to the Rivington Company for the renovation of the office structures. The Rivington Company then applied to the city's Board of Standards and Appeals to allow the office structures to be used as residences. As part of the plan, the basement and first floor of 31 Belvidere Street would remain in commercial use, but the second through fourth floors would become apartments; the board granted the request with minor modifications. In December 2023, the complex was nominated for listing on the New York State Register of Historic Places and National Register of Historic Places (NRHP). The buildings were added to the NRHP on February 20, 2024.

== Architecture ==
The William Ulmer Brewery is on Beaver Street, between Locust and Belvidere streets, in the Bushwick neighborhood of Brooklyn in New York City. The brewery's constituent structures include the main brew house and its annex; the engine–machine house; the office; and the stable–storage house. All of these buildings are between two and four stories high. There was also a courtyard that connected all of these buildings, which had a frame shed and a wash house–racking room measuring one to two stories high; the courthouse was replaced with a parking garage in 1924. The surrounding blocks contain residential rowhouses and apartment buildings, as well as other industrial structures.

According to the New York City Landmarks Preservation Commission (LPC), the main brew house from 1872 and the annex from 1881 were designed by the Brooklyn architect Theobald Engelhardt. The National Park Service (NPS) did not identify an architect for either building. Engelhardt was definitely responsible for the office building, which was completed in 1885. The stable–storage house was designed by Frederick Wunder in 1890. Similar to other German breweries, the Ulmer Brewery buildings were largely designed in the American round-arch style, inspired by the German Renaissance Revival style or Rundbogenstil. As with other factory structures built in that era, regularly spaced window openings let in natural light but also allowed an "organization" and "dignity", while decorative brick facades allowed for both a fire-resistant material and a "relatively economical means of relieving plain brickwork".

=== Main brew house ===
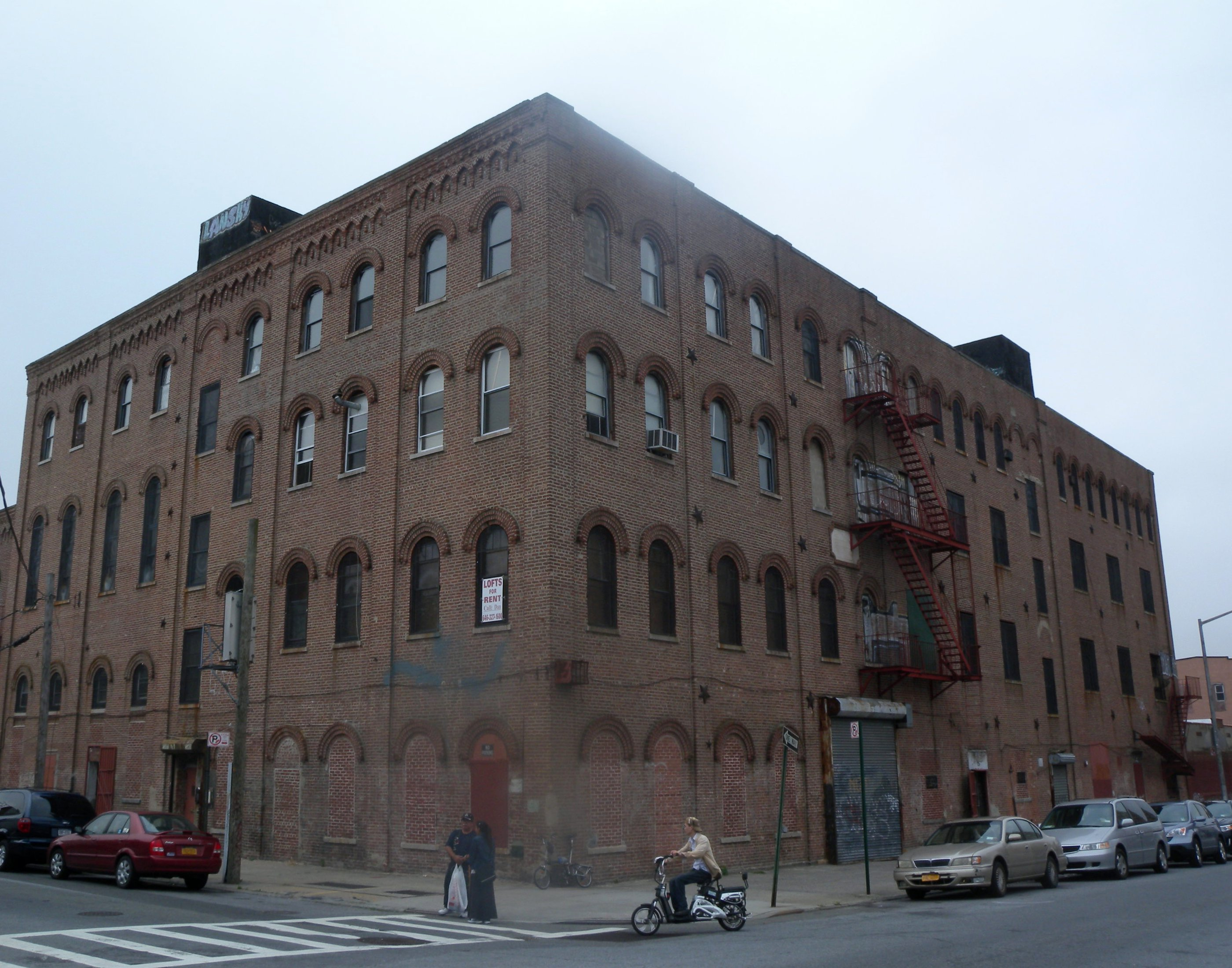
Main brew building looking west from the intersection of Beaver and Belvidere streets. The foreground is the original building (the easternmost section of the Beaver Street facade). Belvidere Street is to the left, and Beaver Street is to the right.

The main brew house, built in 1872 and expanded in 1881, is located at the western corner of Beaver and Belvidere streets. It was originally 2 1/2 stories high and contained a mansard roof. Later expansions brought the building's height to four stories, with a flat roof. The LPC cites the main brewing house as measuring 150 feet (46 m) along its northeastern elevation, on Beaver Street, and 50 feet (15 m) along its southeastern elevation, on Belvidere Street. The original structure comprises the eastern two-thirds closer to the intersection of Beaver and Belvidere streets, with measurements of 100 feet (30 m) on Beaver Street and 60 feet (18 m) on Belvidere Street. The addition at 71–73 Beaver Street, also known as the cold storage house, measures 54 by 60 feet (16 by 18 m), with its shorter dimension on Beaver Street.

==== Facade ====
The brew house contains a facade with brick archivolts above the second through fourth floors' window openings, as well as archivolts at the bricked-over window openings on the first floor. In the original structure, there are three vertical window bays on each side, which are separated by projecting brick vertical pilasters and contain two archivolted windows on each floor. The first floor contains several doors and a roll-down metal gate on Beaver Street, but features few windows. The northwestern two-thirds of the Beaver Street (northeastern) facade contains a different window configuration, and its second and third floors contain rectangular windows without archivolts. Round-arched window openings are visible on the northwestern elevation, facing Locust Street. There is a parapet atop the facade, as well as stairway bulkheads on both Beaver and Belvidere streets. There was also a three-story ventilation shaft.

==== Interior ====
In the main brew house are two basement levels with vaulted ceilings and stone walls; these basements measure 20 and 34 feet (6.1 and 10.4 m) deep respectively. The purpose of the basements is not entirely clear, but they were used for either ice storage or beer storage. The annex has a third basement level in between the main brew house's two basement levels but is otherwise similar in design to the main brew house's basement. The interiors of the four above-ground stories, in both the original structure and the annex, contain similar finishes. The above-ground stories are largely arranged in an open plan, interrupted by a single load-bearing wall made of brick. The floors are made of concrete and wood, the columns are made of cast iron and wood, and the walls are made of exposed brick. Tin ceilings are used in parts of the building, but most of the structure has concrete arch ceilings. The interiors of the cold-storage portion of the building were heavily insulated.

When the brewery was in operation, the main brew house and its annex were used for storing, mashing, and boiling malt grains, as well as fermenting and cooling wort. The top stories were used for storage; hoppers from the fourth story deposited malt grain to tubs on the third floor, where the malt was mixed with water, then crushed, blended, and heated to create wort. The wort was sent down to the second floor, where hops were added and the wort was boiled in large kettles. The hops residue was then removed, and engines on the first floor sent the boiled wort to the top floor of the cold-storage section, where it was to be cooled. After the wort had cooled down and mixed with yeast, it was sent to an even colder room where it would ferment for about ten days, turning into a mixture with about 2% alcohol content. The beer was finally stored in extremely cold vats in the lower stories. To keep the beer cold enough for consumption, the brewery bought natural ice in large quantities. The 1881 annex was built to provide additional cold storage space. After the washroom and keg-filling room were built in 1885, these spaces were used to pour beer into kegs.

=== Engine–machine building ===
On Belvidere Street, to the southwest of the brew house, is the engine–machine building, built as a two-and-three-story structure in 1885. It also contained brick archivolts; a projecting pilaster separating the building's two pairs of bays; and a cornice made of brick. The structure measures 90 feet (27 m) wide and 40 feet (12 m) deep. The three-story portion is located just southwest of the main brew house, and their facades are flush with each other. The design of the engine–machine building's facade copied that of the main brew house.

The northeastern half of the engine–machine building contains extra-high first and second floors, such that the third floor of the building aligns with the fourth floor of the main brew house. This half of the building is composed of four bays, each with one window; the bays are grouped into two pairs, and the first-floor windows have been partially bricked up. Combined with the main brew house, it forms an L-shaped structure. The southwestern half is two stories, corresponding with the southwestern section of the main brew house. The first floor contains two garage doors, a metal roll-down gate, and small window openings above the garage doors. The facade has four windows on each floor. Part of the side elevation, facing southwest, can also be seen from the street and contains round-arched windows; the western corner protrudes outward and likely contained a smokestack. The rear elevation, facing northwest, cannot be seen from the street but has eight window openings per story, four each from the northeastern and southwestern halves of the building.

The engine–machine building has an open-plan interior. The northeastern half, formerly the machine house, has double-height first- and second-story spaces. The southwestern half, formerly the engine building, has garage spaces on the first floor and open-plan spaces on the second floor. The finishes are similar to those in the main brew house and its annex. When the brewery was in operation, the machine house's second story had an ammonia machine that could quickly turn liquids into gases and vice versa; it was powered by an engine on the first floor. The engine building contained large boilers and a smokestack. As at Brooklyn's other breweries, the William Ulmer Brewery's boilers used several tons of coal every day.

=== Office building ===
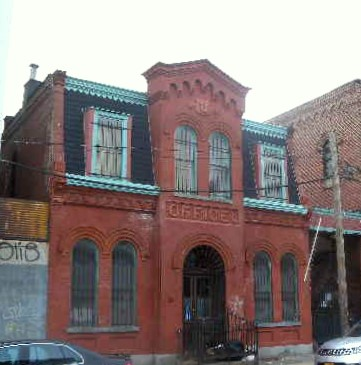
Office, seen in 2011

The two-story office building, completed in 1890, has the address 31 Belvidere Street and is in the middle of the block between Broadway to the south and Beaver Street to the north. The building was designed in the Romanesque Revival style. The original building measures 33 feet (10 m) wide and 45 feet (14 m) deep. It has two annexes: a two-story brick structure measuring 54 by 22 feet (16.5 by 6.7 m) to the rear, and a one-story cement-block structure measuring 22 by 7 feet (6.7 by 2.1 m) at its northwestern corner. These structures occupy a rectangular lot measuring 49 by 102 feet (15 by 31 m) across.

The office building was intended as the brewery's "focal point" and, by extension, a representation of Ulmer's company. The office building features a cobblestone facade, a slate-covered mansard roof, and terracotta ornament. The facade is divided into two bays: the outer bays contain two pairs of arched windows on the first floor and two dormered windows on the second floor. These flank the central bay, which contain a main archway on the first floor; an engraved sign with the letters "OFFICE" above the archway; a second floor with two windows; and a pediment above the second floor. The letter U, representing the Ulmer Brewery, is visible above the two central second-floor windows, as well as on a pair of brackets above the outer first-floor windows. The southwestern elevation has a red-brick facade above a concrete block wall. The northeastern elevation has a first-story opening, four round-arched windows, and a cornice; the northwestern elevation is not visible from the street but has a similar design.

A cobblestone driveway is located northeast of the office building. The driveway separates the office building from the engine–machine building and is protected by a wooden canopy. The driveway is accessed by an elaborate black wrought-iron gate, which likely dates to 1885 and is decorated with floral and geometric motifs. When the brewery was active, the office structure contained the offices of the brewery's managers, who could access any of the three other buildings via the courtyard. By the 1990s, the building had been separated into two single-story apartments. one on each floor. The apartments have a combined seven bedrooms and retain some of their interior decorative details.

=== Stable–storage building ===
The stable–storage building, completed in 1885, has the address 28 Locust Street and is on the northwestern portion of the site. It was the last major structure to be developed for the brewery. The stable–storage building measures 89 by 97 feet (27 by 30 m) and is largely rectangular. The building is 3 1/2 stories high with a cellar that is located half a story below ground level. Behind the main structure, which has a pitched roof, is a two story rear annex with a flat roof. A cobblestone driveway runs to the northeast of the stable building, and a roll-down gate conceals the driveway from view of the street.

The facade is made of cobblestone. The Locust Street facade has been split vertically into six bays, each with one window; the bays are grouped into pairs. The stable building contains archivolted windows on the third floor; parapets above the first and third floors; pilasters between the windows; and a pediment atop the center bay facing Locust Street. There is also a pediment above the first-story entrance, as well as windows that illuminate the basement. An elevator was constructed by 1932 in a separate shaft, possibly on a preexisting one-story building. The elevator shaft had window openings that are filled in with concrete blocks, and there are corbels and dentils above the shaft. The northeastern elevation is visible from behind the main brewery building's annex and is divided into five groups of two bays; part of the northeastern elevation is blocked by the elevator shaft. The other two elevations are partly visible from the street and contain simpler detailing than the main facade and the northeastern elevation.

Originally, the stable–storage building was used as a garage for the brewery's wagons, which were then replaced with trucks. The structure was a cooperage by 1918, just before the brewery closed. The interior has been modified into residential apartments.

== See also ==
- List of defunct breweries in the United States
- List of New York City Designated Landmarks in Brooklyn
- National Register of Historic Places listings in Brooklyn

== Sources ==
- Bradley, Betsy Hunter (1999). The Works: The Industrial Architecture of the United States. Oxford University Press. ISBN 978-0-19-509000-0.
- Presa, Donald (December 9, 2014). Central Ridgewood Historic District (PDF) (Report). New York City Landmarks Preservation Commission.
- William Ulmer Brewery (PDF) (Report). New York City Landmarks Preservation Commission. May 11, 2010.
- William Ulmer Brewery Complex (PDF) (Report). New York State Office of Parks, Recreation and Historic Preservation; National Park Service. 2023. Archived from the original (PDF) on February 2, 2024.
