= Judith K. Zilczer =

American art historian

- Education: BA, MA, The George Washington University; PhD, University of Delaware
- Occupation(s): Curator, art historian
- Employer: Hirshhorn Museum and Sculpture Garden

Judith K. Zilczer is an American art historian and former museum curator. She is known for her work with artists such as Horace Pippin, Raymond Duchamp-Villon, Willem de Kooning, and Richard Lindner. Zilczer was interested in the connections between music and art, which she described as "the mystical strain of artistic synesthesia." She curated an exhibit titled "Visual Music: Synaesthesia in Art and Music Since 1900". Zilczer served at the Hirshhorn Museum and Sculpture Garden (HMSG) in various capacities from 1974–2003. In 1978, she organized for the Hirshhorn Museum "The Noble Buyer:" John Quinn Patron of the Avant-Garde, a detailed account of one of the most important collections of modern art assembled in the early years of the 20th Century (which was disseminated after Quinn's death in 1924). From 1992 to 2003, she was Curator of Paintings.

Her papers are held by the Smithsonian Institution Archives.

== Writings ==
- Judith K. Zilczer, "Robert J. Coady, Forgotten Spokesman for Avant-Garde Culture in America," American Art Review, vol. 2, no. 6 (Nov.-Dec. 1975), p. 81.
- Kerry Brougher, Jeremy Strick, Ari Weisman, Judith Zilczer. Visual Music: Synaesthesia in Art Since 1900 Thames & Hudson; 2005. ISBN 0-500-51217-5.
