= Olga Viso =

Cuban American curator and museum director

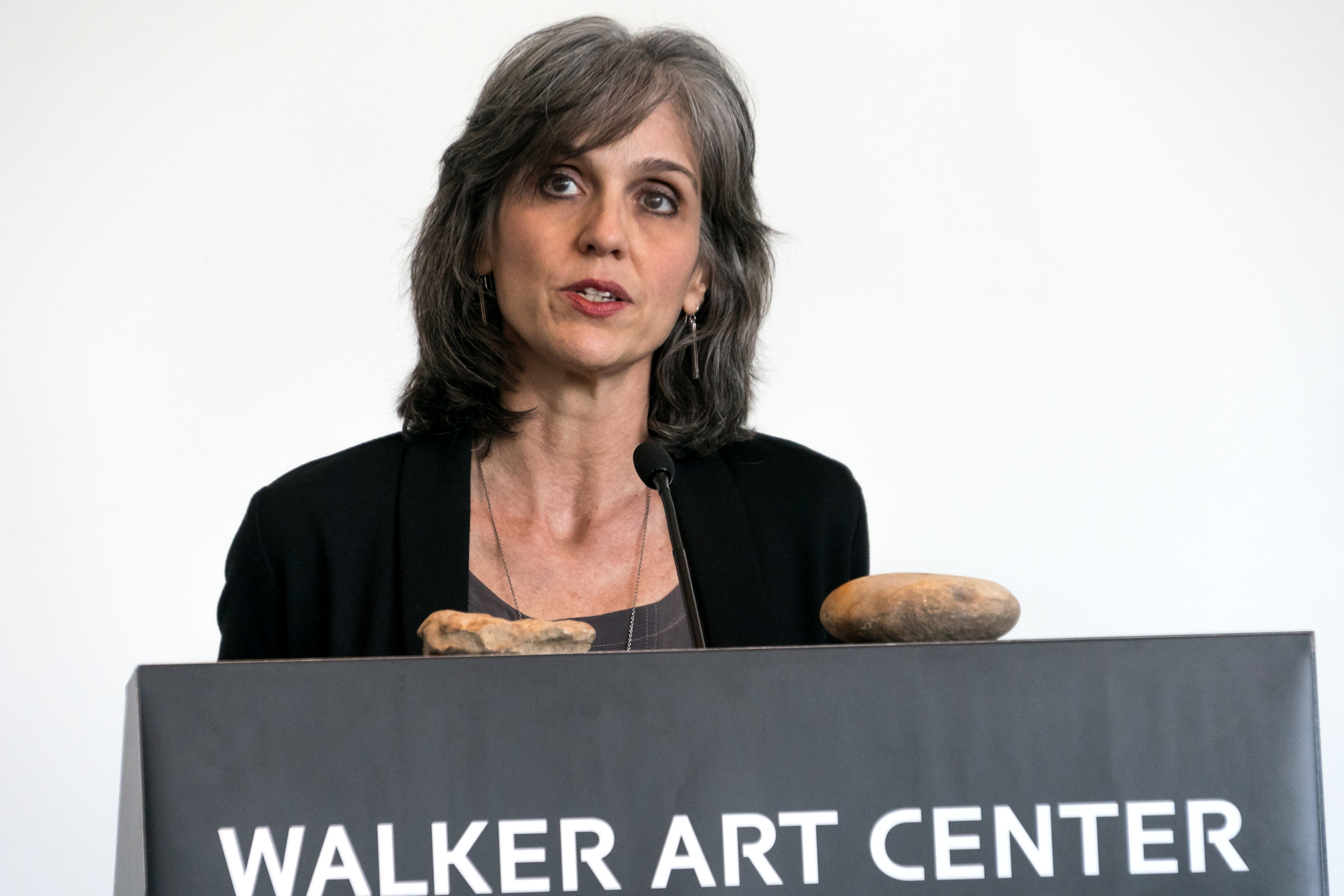
- Viso speaking at the Walker Art Center
- Born: Florida, U.S
- Education: Rollins College, Emory University
- Occupation(s): Museum director, curator
- Organization(s): Director of Curatorial Affairs and Selig Family Chief Curator, Phoenix Art Museum, Senior Advisor, Herberger Institute for Design and the Arts, Executive Director, Walker Art Center, Director, Hirshhorn Museum and Sculpture Garden
- Board member of: Andy Warhol Foundation for the Visual Arts

Olga Viso (born 1966) is a Cuban American curator of modern and contemporary art and a museum director based at Phoenix Art Museum and Arizona State University's Herberger Institute for Design and the Arts in Tempe, Arizona. She served as executive director of the Walker Art Center in Minneapolis, Minnesota from 2007 through 2017, and was curator of contemporary art and director of the Smithsonian Institution's Hirshhorn Museum and Sculpture Garden in Washington, DC from 1995-2007.

== Career ==
In 2023, Viso joined the executive leadership team of the Phoenix Art Museum as the Selig Family Chief Curator and Director of Curatorial Affairs and oversees the Museum's curatorial division as well as modern and contemporary art exhibitions and acquisitions. In 2018, Viso joined the leadership team at Arizona State University's Herberger Institute for Design and the Arts, where she is a senior advisor, building global arts partnerships, among them with the Los Angeles County Museum of Art and James Turrell's Roden Crater Project. Before coming to ASU, Viso was executive director of the Walker for ten years. There she oversaw a significant facilities expansion that integrated the Walker's main campus with the Minneapolis Sculpture Garden, added a new entrance, and sixteen new outdoor sculptures, including commissions with artists Nairy Baghramian, Katharina Fritsch, Theaster Gates, and Mark Manders.

Viso joined the Walker Art Center in 2008, leaving her post as Director of the Hirshhorn Museum and Sculpture Garden which she held since 2005. She joined the Hirshhorn in 1995, working her way up from assistant curator. Before that, Viso curated at the Norton Museum of Art in West Palm Beach, Florida (1993–95) and at the High Museum of Art in Atlanta, Georgia (1989–93). She has served on the board of directors of the Andy Warhol Foundation for the Visual Arts and belongs to the Association of Art Museum Directors. In 2013, President Barack Obama appointed Viso to the National Council on the Arts.

Viso has curated many major exhibitions, including Ana Mendieta: Earth Body, Sculpture and Performance 1972-1985, a retrospective of about 100 works shown at the Hirshhorn and the Whitney Museum of American Art in 2004. Another exhibition Viso curated was Jim Hodges: Give More Than You Take. This show traveled from the Dallas Museum of Art (October 6, 2013 – January 12, 2014) to the Walker Art Center (February 15–May 11, 2014) then on to the Institute of Contemporary Art, Boston (June 5–September 1, 2014) and ended at UCLA Hammer Museum, Los Angeles (October 5, 2014 – January 17, 2015).

Viso resigned from her position as executive director of the Walker Art Center in 2017, and there was some speculation that her departure was related to the controversy surrounding Sam Durant's artwork Scaffold, though many museum professionals have publicly expressed support for Viso's handling of the work's reception. The artist, Sam Durant, took primary accountability and transferred the rights of the work to the Dakota and agreed they would dismantle and ceremoniously burn the work. In 2021, plans to erect a monument on the site of the massacre were approved, a work by a Dakota artist, Angela Two Stars, in which visitors may sit and pay their respects. Viso reflected on the controversy in an opinion piece for the New York Times in 2018, "Decolonizing the Art Museum: The Second Wave," where she acknowledged the colonizing forces at play in museums and the broader art world and urged museum leaders to "stop seeing activists as antagonists."
