= Maynard K. Hine Hall and University Tower =

Building on the campus of Indiana University Indianapolis

Hine Hall and University Tower
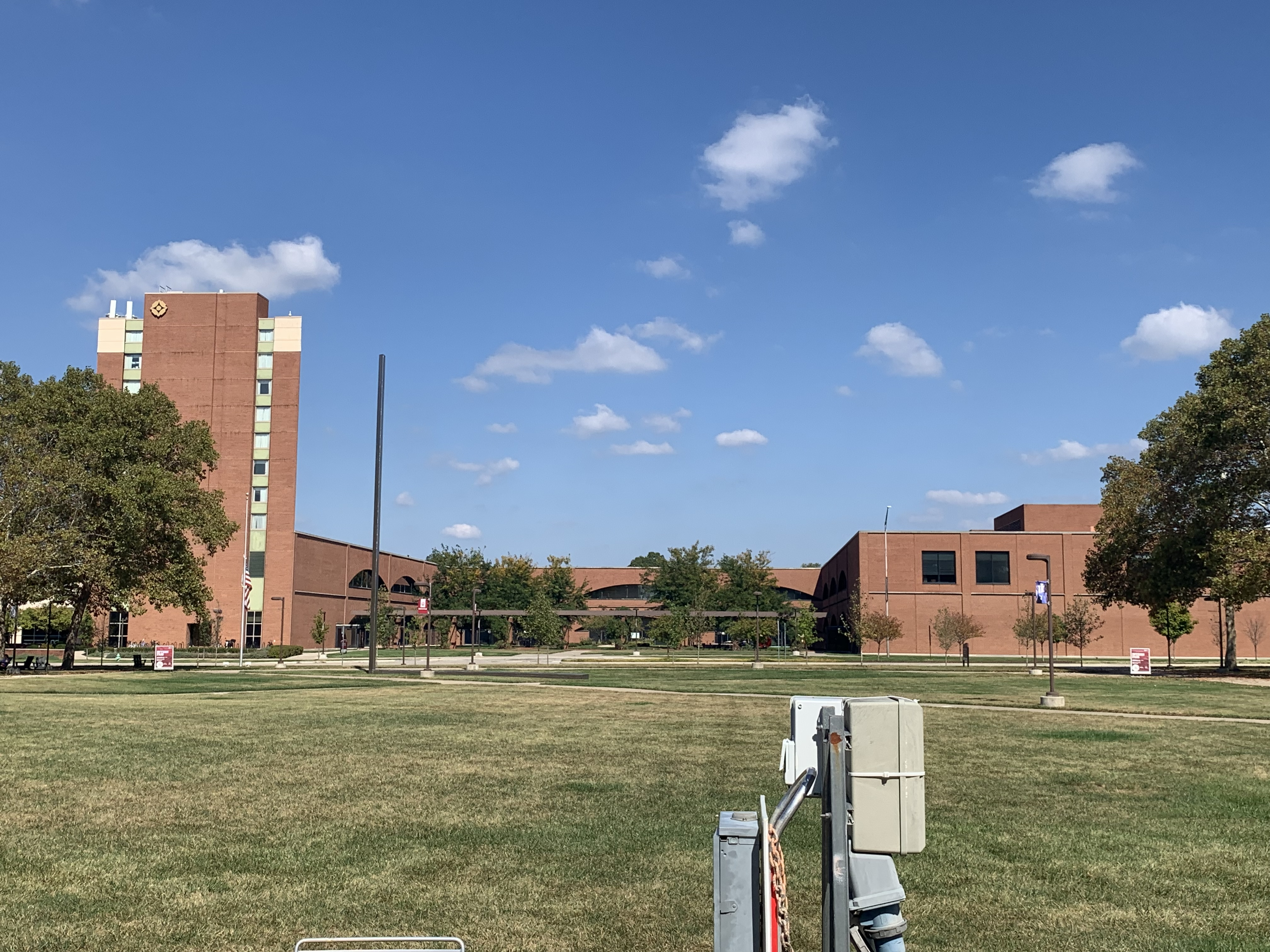
- Interactive map of the Hine Hall and University Tower area
- Former names: University Place Conference Center and University Place Hotel

General information
- Location: 875 W North St, Indianapolis, IN 4620
- Coordinates: 39°46′30.496″N 86°10′27.501″W
- Named for: Maynard K. Hine
- Groundbreaking: 1985
- Completed: 1987
- Affiliation: Indiana University-Purdue University Indianapolis

Design and construction
- Architect: Ellerbe Architects & Engineers

Maynard K. Hine Hall and University Tower is a conjoined academic center and first-year student residence located on the Indiana University Indianapolis campus. The building is located north of Robert E. Cavanaugh Hall, Joseph T. Taylor Hall, and the Business/SPEA Building. The building serves as a hub of student activity with its close proximity to the IUPUI Campus Center to the southwest, Lockfield Green to its north, and the North Residence Hall to its northwest.

== History ==
Originally, Hine Hall was built as the University Place Hotel and Conference Center in 1987 and designed by Ellerbe Architects & Engineers. Briefly, the University Place Hotel was also known as the Lincoln Hotel, but was changed quickly to rebrand with Indiana University. The hotel was planned to accommodate the 1987 Pan American Games and any other future events that may come to the IUPUI Campus. IUPUI continued to run the conference center after the Pan American Games and used the space to promote large academic conferences and symposiums on campus. The 278-bed University Place Hotel was privately operated until 2013.

Construction for the University Place Hotel and Conference Center began in 1985. The excavation of the property was finished in April 1987. The Hagerman Construction Company of Fort Wayne, Indiana was responsible for building the structural steel system of the hotel and center. The construction received approval from the Commission of Higher Education on May 9, 1986. The final construction phase was completed by the Lincoln Hotel Corporation, which would run the hotel on behalf of Indiana University. The proposed name for the conference center by the IUPUI trustees was the Indiana University Conference Center, but after student protests, the name was changed to the University Conference Center at IU.

The year 1988 was a big year for the structure and inhabitants of the hotel. A gift shop named The White Rabbit opened on the fifth floor to offer jewelry, sundries, and clothing on campus to provide students and visitors with more choice on campus. The IU Foundation moved to the second floor of the conference center. The Lincoln Hotel Corporation decided to liquidate some of their hotel holdings leading to temporary management under Conference Environments Inc.

In 1995, the University Place Hotel found itself in the middle of controversy surrounding allegations of discrimination stemming from the hotel's refusal to sell the Indianapolis Recorder. The hotel reportedly sold other papers from New York and Chicago but not the Recorder. Critics began to call out this practice in August 1995, and by September the hotel began offering the Indianapolis Recorder to guests. In 1997, Doubletree Hotels took control of University Place Hotel in partnership with IUPUI. Doubletree renovated all 278 guest rooms with new furnishings and began adding their branding inside the building.

The Indiana University Trustees purchased the hotel and conference center for a total of $17.5 million in 2005 but talks of the deal began in late 2004. The university felt that the hotel could serve as a residential hall for on-campus students and that the conference center was an important source of revenue. The conference center further drew academic talent to the Indianapolis campus through various events. In 2008, the first floor of the hotel was renovated to create a new and improved food court area for student tenants. The conference center had a multipurpose room and several support areas added.

=== Academic Center and Student Residence ===
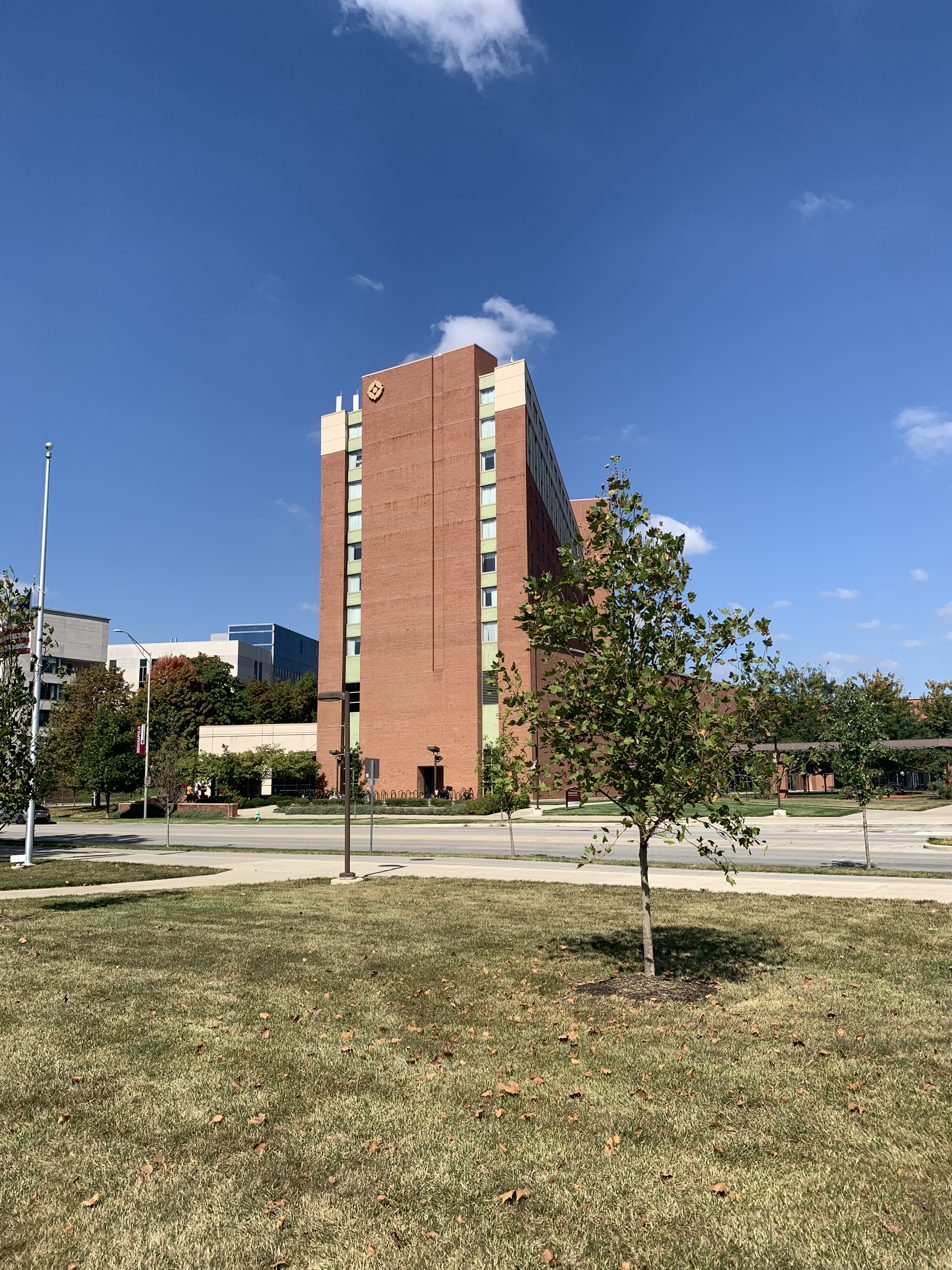
Southern facade of University Tower, 2023.

In 2013, the University Hotel was repurposed as an academic center with lecture halls, classrooms, and administrative offices. The University Conference Center was renamed Hine Hall after Maynard K. Hine, the first chancellor of IUPUI. The University Tower was converted into first-year student housing, a university dining hall, and a dining facility known as Chancellor's. The University Tower became home to 600 first-year students for the first time in August 2013 with private bathrooms in every dorm.

In 2017, Hine Hall was renovated to add new updated classrooms, a ballroom, banquet rooms, and a 370-seat auditorium. The goal was to continue offering event opportunities on campus and a more active learning environment. In 2019, the IU Trustees approved the redesigned Hine Hall courtyard to create a more inviting green space for students, faculty, staff and visitors. The new design included the addition of a new doorway on the north side of the courtyard to provide access, additional trees for shading, and benches created from the reclaimed cedar of the Vermont Street Parking Garage façade. In 2022, Callery pear trees, also known as Bradford pear, were removed around Hine Hall in cooperation with the State of Indiana Cooperative Invasives Management and replaced with native trees.

==== University Tower Student Government ====
Founded in 2012 as the University Tower Council (UTC), the University Tower residence hall has had various iterations of a way for students to advocate for changes they may want to see in their building. The former IUPUI and now IU Indianapolis have always prided themselves in having been a chapter of NRHH (National Residence Hall Honorary) as well as the large role student initiatives play on campus. Although the UTC was disbanded after the 2021–2022 school year, due to pandemic effects on housing, the organization was brought back during the 2024–2025 school year under the name "University Tower Activities Council" (UTAC), affectionately called "Hall Council" by residents of the building.

Although records were not exceptionally or centrally kept/made public as to the list of Student Presidents of University Tower, below is a list of all Presidents of University Tower from sources made publicly available:

UTC Presidents:

2012-19 | Unknown

2019-20 | Sarah Berge

2020-21 | Jenna Nicodemus

2021-22 | Gabriella “Gabby” Weaver

2022-24 | UTC Disbanded

UTAC Presidents:

2024-25 | Zayd Qureshi

2025-26 | Braden Crynes

== Namesake ==
The building was named in honor of Maynard K. Hine, Dean of the IU School of Dentistry from 1945 to 1968. In 1969, Hine became the first Chancellor of IUPUI, which he held until 1973. Hine was instrumental in the innovation of Dental education at IUPUI and the early expansion of the Indianapolis campus.

== National Art Museum of Sport ==
The National Art Museum of Sport (NAMOS) was founded in 1959. In 1987, NAMOS opened its exhibition during the Pan Am Games at the University Place Hotel. The collection in its entirety moved from the University of New Haven to Indianapolis in 1991. The collection was housed in the Bank One Tower in Indianapolis until it relocated back to the IUPUI campus. NAMOS returned to University Place in 1994 due to its rising reputation as a sports center.

NAMOS consists of more than 1,000 paintings, drawings, sculptures, and photographs in the collection, which is the nation's largest and most diversified assortment of art portraying American sports. NAMOS also includes an extensive photography and slide collection of significant events in sports history. The acquisitions include an extensive collection of wood engravings by Winslow Homer, depicting mid-nineteenth-century sports and recreational activities. Other artists represented include Fletcher Martin, George Bellows, R. Tait McKenzie, and Alfred Boucher.

The exhibition left the University Place Hotel in 2012 and moved to the NCAA Headquarters, where it remained in storage until being acquired by the Children's Museum of Indianapolis in 2017.

== See also ==
- Indiana University–Purdue University Indianapolis Public Art Collection
