= Mary E. Cable Building =

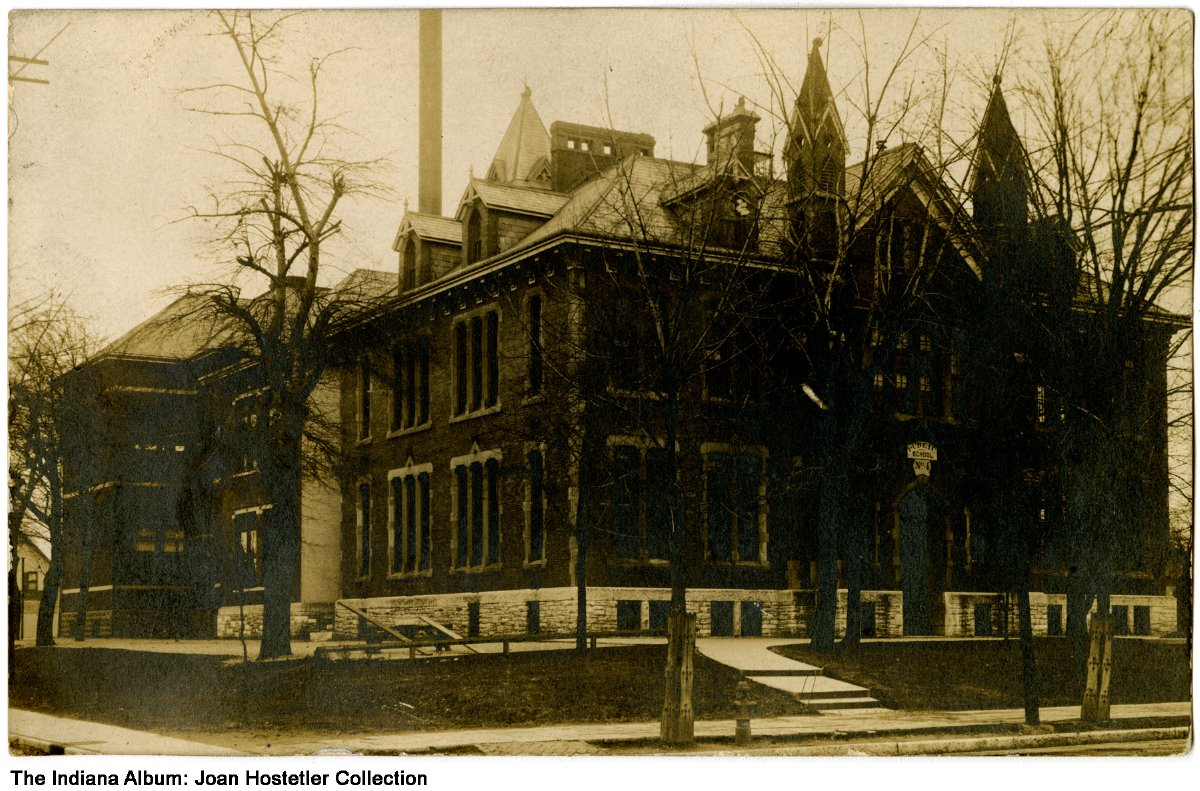
- Interactive map of the Mary E. Cable Building area
- Former names: Mary E. Cable Elementary School and Public Elementary School No. 4

General information
- Location: 103 Indianapolis Cultural Trail, Indianapolis, IN 46202
- Coordinates: 39°46′29.175″N 86°10′11.326″W
- Named for: Mary Ellen Cable
- Completed: 1953
- Demolished: 2006
- Affiliation: Indiana University-Purdue University Indianapolis

From 1867 to 1980, the public elementary school no. 4, or Mary E. Cable Elementary School, occupied the site on the corner of North Blackford Street and West Michigan Street in Indianapolis. The school provided education to young African American children beginning in 1922 due to the segregation of public education. IUPUI acquired the building and used it to house various academic programs and departments until its demolition in 2006.

== History ==
The Mary E. Cable Elementary School was constructed in 1953 to replace the old School No. 4 on the site and had an addition built in 1962. The school is named after Mary Ellen Cable who is known for their decades of teaching in Indiana Public Schools and civil activism in the Indianapolis area. The brick school building consisted of 66,500-square-feet with a gymnasium included.

In the spring of 1975, a daycare center was established in the Mary E. Cable Building for students who needed a place to care for their children during class time. Originally known as the IUPUI Childcare Center, the daycare center was opened by the Student Services and the Student Associations. The facility was created to handle 30 to 35 children at once. By the fall of 1976, the IUPUI Day Care Center faced funding and staffing issues that resulted in the center reaching out to students for more users.

In November 1980, the IU Board of Trustees approved a proposal to lease the elementary school. The elementary school would house the Reserve Officer Training Corps program, the IUPUI Day Care Center, and the Department of Communications and Theatre. The IU Speech department moved from Robert E. Cavanaugh Hall to the elementary school in 1982. The building housed most of the English composition programs with some remaining at Cavanaugh Hall. The University Theatre also moved from the Marott Building to the elementary school. The theatre faculty and staff renovated the gymnasium into a usable theatre. Other renovations included the homemaking classroom converted into a costume classroom, the cafeteria converted into a stagecraft laboratory, a coal storage room converted into a studio theatre, and a storage room converted into a make-up laboratory.

In 1984, the Korean Language School moved to the Mary E. Cable Building alongside the Estonian Language School and German Language School. By 1988, the Mary Cable Building was the primary site for writing, communications, journalism, and theatre education on campus. The University Theatre occupied the remodeled elementary school gymnasium. The University Theatre had gained significant attention for its children's theatre program and children's playwriting contest.

In 1991, the Computer Music Technology Cluster was established on the first floor of the Cable Building. The Music Lab consisted of a 21-station that included a Musical Instrument Digital Interface that eliminates the need for software by storing music directly on the computer. The lab was created in cooperation with the IUPUI Office of Computing Services and represented a growing partnership between the School of Music and Computer Services.

In 1998, the Sagamore secretly hired Micro Air, a local environmental services firm, to perform a 48-hour air sampling test in the basement of the Cable building. The test found elevated levels of Radon, a radioactive gas, that defied campus health and safety policies. The results did not immediately lead to action since the radon was below recommended levels for commercial and schools. The issue stemmed from the building housing the IUPUI Childcare Center and the presence of radon gas continued to worry parents. The childcare center had a new facility constructed on the west side of campus. The new Center for Young Children was constructed in 2000 by CSO architects. Following its completion, the daycare center at the Cable building was relocated to the new facility.

The building closed in 2005 and was demolished in January 2006 by IUPUI due to asbestos contamination. The Informatics & Communications Technology Complex would serve as the new home for many of the programs housed at the Cable Building including the School of Music at IUPUI and Department of Communication Studies.

== Namesake ==
The former elementary school is named after its former principal, Mary Ellen Cable. Cable served as a public educator in various Indianapolis schools for 40 years. Cable was served in many all-black schools during segregation in Indiana. Cable was born in Kansas in 1862, worked in Indianapolis schools between 1893 and 1933, and died in 1944 at the age of 82. In 1893, Cable began teaching black children who suffered from tuberculous at Public School No. 4. Eventually, Cable served as principal of the entire school.

== Notable features ==
=== Computer Music Laboratory ===
In 1992, IUPUI added a new state-of-the-art music facility at the Mary E. Cable Building for students in computer music classes. The new music laboratory consisted of 21 lab stations that contained IBM computers and Roland keyboard synthesizers. At the time, the music lab was the largest fully networked computer music education facility in the United States. The goal was to provide an individual workstation for each student in a class. The lab doubled as a research and development center for exploring new computer-based music education methods. The Music Lab would assist in hosting the International Music and Technology Conference every June at IUPUI beginning in 2000 to 2006.

== See also ==
- Indiana University–Purdue University Indianapolis Public Art Collection
