= Robert E. Cavanaugh Hall =

Building in Indianapolis, Indiana

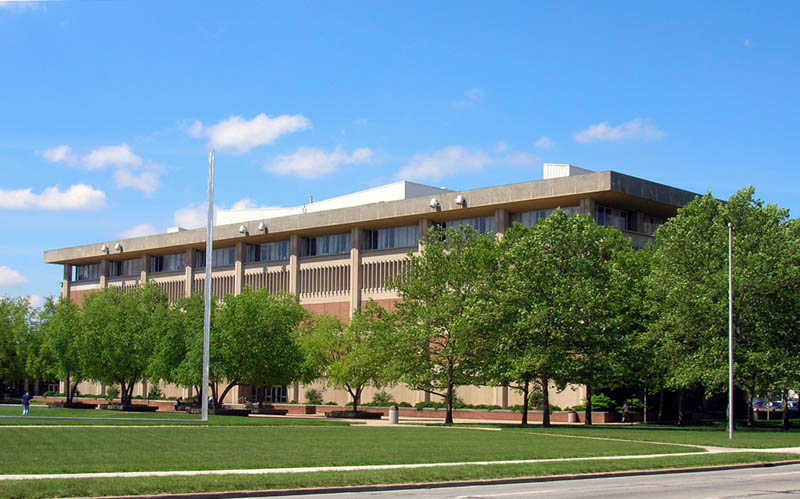
- Cavanaugh Hall in 2005.

General information
- Location: 425 University Blvd, Indianapolis, IN 46202-5140
- Coordinates: 39°46′25.244″N 86°10′30.327″W
- Named for: Robert E. Cavanaugh
- Groundbreaking: 1969
- Completed: 1971
- Affiliation: Indiana University-Purdue University Indianapolis

Design and construction
- Architect: Reid, Thompson & Boots Associates, Inc.

Robert E. Cavanaugh Hall was one of the first non-medical academic buildings constructed on the IUPUI campus alongside Joseph T. Taylor Hall, known as the Blake Street Library at that time, and the Lecture Hall. Cavanaugh Hall served as an early hub for academic, administrative, and student activities which would lead to a constantly reshuffling of space usage. Competition of space for classrooms, administrative activities, and student activities would underscore the history of Cavanaugh Hall. Cavanaugh Hall currently serves as the home for the IUPUI School of Liberal Arts and various related research units.

Cavanaugh Hall is home to the Ray Bradbury Center, which holds some of author Ray Bradbury's archives and exhibits his full home office.

== History ==
Cavanaugh Hall was completed in 1971 and located on Agnes Street, later known as 925 W. Michigan Street, and designed by Reid, Thompson & Boots Associates, Inc. Cavanaugh Hall was named after Robert E. Cavanaugh, former dean of the IU Extension Campus. The groundbreaking ceremony was held on September 4, 1968. Cavanaugh Hall consisted of 69 classrooms, 15 laboratories, 150 offices, a faculty lounge on the fifth floor, and the campus bookstore located in the basement. The dedication was accompanied by a protest by the Black Student Union for better educational and health programs for inner-city communities. The student union emphasized that they were not opposed to the dedication of Cavanaugh Hall and just wanted to bring greater attention to community issues.

Cavanaugh Hall served as an academic hub for students, especially non-medical students with various facilities housed in the building. Some of these facilities included the Campus Centre Theatre Box Office which allowed students to purchase tickets to performances hosted by fellow students in Indianapolis and the campus housekeeping services located in the basement.

Following its completion, many academic departments moved to the new building with the School of Liberal Arts making up the majority of the units. The IU Speech Department moved from the Marott Building, now known as the Turnverein Apartment Complex, to Cavanaugh Hall. In 1972, the restructuring of undergraduate programs led to the creation of the School of Liberal Arts (humanities and social sciences). The IUPUI (Indiana University Purdue University Indianapolis) School of Social Work, previously known as the School of Social Service, moved to Cavanaugh Hall sometime between 1971 and 1973. The IUPUI Economics Department opened the new Economic Statistics Laboratory on the fourth floor of Cavanaugh in September 1972.

In the 1970s, IUPUI began moving programs that were essential to student activity to Cavanaugh Hall. This included the Admissions Office, Registrar Office, Bursar Office, and Financial Aid Office which all took up residence on the first floor of Cavanaugh. This led to a decrease in the total number of classrooms able to be used in Cavanaugh due to the need for administrative space. A student lounge was set up on the lower floor with vending machines, television sets, and places to socialize for students to relax while on campus. The campus bookstore was also set up on the lower floor of Cavanaugh where students could get all their textbooks for classes. The Arts and Sciences Office was established on the fourth floor of the building to handle credit requirements for science and liberal arts programs. The Office for Scholarships and Financial Aid and the Student Services office were established on the third floor to assist students in their academic activities. The Student Senate Office on the second floor was established in the new building to create a space for IUPUI student senate members to hold meetings. In 1971, Sherry Bennett established a new campuswide paper named the IUPUI Sagamore in an office space on 38th Street. Eventually, the office was relocated to the second floor of Cavanaugh Hall, then to the basement area. The Student Senate established a bulletin board in the Cavanaugh Lobby to inform students of upcoming activities, furthering solidifying the building as a hub for student activity.

In 1973, the School of Science and Liberal Arts programs were reorganized into separate entities which led to the dissolution of the Arts and Science Office. The School of Liberal Arts Office was established in its place, while the School of Science Office moved from Cavanaugh to the Administration Building. The Student Association moved from the second floor to the basement to make room for more classrooms. In the Summer of 1977, the University Division moved to the Engineering and Technology Building to create more space for the Financial Aid Office due to growing enrollment.

Space issues would persist throughout the 1970s, but the leasing of the Mary E. Cable Building would alleviate the need for more classroom space for the School of Liberal Arts for the next couple decades. In November 1980, the IU Board of Trustees approved a proposal to lease the Mary E. Cable Elementary School. The Department of Communications and Theatre would move from Cavanaugh Hall to the elementary school. Despite this new space, Cavanaugh would continue welcoming new administrative and academic units throughout the 1980s.

In 1981, the School of Journalism opened spaces on the Indianapolis campus in Cavanaugh Hall on the third floor. These spaces consisted of four classrooms and two offices. In January 1982, the School of Social Worked moved from Cavanaugh Hall to the Education building. In September 1982, the IUPUI Writing Center officially opened on the fourth floor of Cavanaugh to assist students with their writing needs. In 1983, the first floor of Cavanaugh Hall was remodeled to consolidate the Bursar, Registrar, Admission, and Financial Aid Office all in a single location. The goal was to students to conduct all their administrative needs without needing to travel across campus.

The mid-1980s saw a plethora of new administrative and research units begin to occupy Cavanaugh Hall. The Institute for Humanities Research opened on the fifth floor of Cavanaugh Hall in August 1984. In 1984, Cavanaugh Hall houses the Center for American Studies, Peirce Edition Project, Journal of the Early Republic, and Center for Economic Development. The Center for American Studies and Journal of the Early Republic shared an office space on the fifth floor of Cavanaugh. The Center for American Studies occupied the former office of the dean of social work, whereas the Journal of the Early Republic occupied the assistant dean's office. Brian S. Vargus, Sociology professor, successfully proposed the creation of the Public Opinion Laboratory in the School of Liberal Arts. The goal of the laboratory was to develop internship opportunities for students interested in public opinion research as well as gather community data to be used professional development opportunities. At the end of 1984, the fourth floor of Cavanaugh was renovated to create more space for the School of Liberal Arts. In October 1985, the School of Liberal Arts announced the formation of the Office of Student Affairs located on the fourth floor to provide academic services for liberal art majors. In 1986, the Black Student Union vacated their office in the basement of Cavanaugh and moved to the basement of the Blake Street Library. The new space was renovated for the Adult Education Center, which was created to support continuing education programs. In 1987, the Office of Women's Research and Resources was established in Cavanaugh Hall. The office is now currently housed in the University Library.

The construction of new buildings in the late 1980s and early 1990s on campus would allow some academic units to transfer to new locations, while those that remained shuffled into new spaces. In 1991, the Department of Geology and Biology moved from the third floor to the new Science Building. The third floor became the new home for the Departments of Anthropology, Religious Studies, and Sociology. Sue Steinmetz, Head of the Sociology Department, moved the Sociology Department to the third floor of Cavanaugh. This included establishing the Family Research Project and the Sussman Research Library on the third floor. The Sussman Research Library was established through a contribution of the books, journals, and papers of Marvin B. Sussman. The library contains a large collection of materials on family science and sociology, with an emphasis on population, aging, family violence, sexuality, health, law, history, race/ethnicity, and deviance.

Without a dedicated campus center, Cavanaugh Hall served as one of the focal points of student activity but was constantly plagued with competition for classroom and office space. In 1996, the Student Canteen located in the basement of Cavanaugh was cut in half to create room for a new enrollment center. This project created student outrage over the loss of student-dedicated space amid controversies surrounding a dedicated student center. Students expressed how the university has continued to eliminate existing student activity spaces without creating a Student Center. Administration defended its actions by stating that the university is in dire need of a new and improved enrollment center to improve student retention. Later that year, the third floor was renovated to centralize the communication studies program into a single building. Communication faculty members vacated the University Library and Mary E. Cable Building to consolidate the program space in Cavanaugh.

After the new IUPUI Campus Center was completed in 2008, the Cavanaugh Hall bookstore was closed and moved to its new location in the basement of the Campus Center. In 2012, the former campus bookstore space was renovated by Rosk Group to convert the space into classrooms and student social spaces. The space had served as an informal gathering place for students in Cavanaugh, but the space continued to be underutilized until the renovation.

== Research centers ==
=== Global Health Communication Center ===
The Global Health Communication Center (GHCC) was established in May 2006. The GHCC studies the relationship between communication and global health, primarily how communication affects the quality of care, availability, and research. The mission of the center is to improve health care and promote great access to health care through more effective health communication.

=== Intercultural Center for Intercultural Communication ===
The International Center for Intercultural Communication (ICIC) was established in 1998 as a research unit housed in the Department of English in the IU School of Liberal Arts. The ICIC studies the English language and intercultural communication using linguistic science. The ICIC applies its research by creating educational resources and training in the English language and culture. In 2003, an Endowed Chair position was established due to a gift from the Zimmer family. In 2015, the ICIC moved to the second floor in Cavanaugh Hall to be with the rest of the School of Liberal.

=== Luis Alberto Ambroggio Center for Latino Studies ===
The Luis Alberto Ambroggio Center for Latino Studies formally opened on November 1, 2018, in Room 323 of Cavanaugh Hall. Nearly 2,000 volumes are in the center, covering classic Spanish literature, linguistics, American history, and more. The center was named after the Argentine American poet, Luis Alberto Ambroggio.

=== National Council on Public History ===
The National Council of Public History (NCPH) promotes the advancement of public history by promoting professionalism among history practitioners. NCPH represents consultants, museum professionals, government historians, professors and students, archivists, teachers, cultural resource managers, curators, film and media producers, historical interpreters, policy advisors, etc. NCPH is responsible for The Public Historian and Public History News. NCPH moved to IUPUI in 1990 and were originally located on in various spaces within Cavanaugh Hall before settling in their current space on the first floor in 2014.

=== Ray Bradbury Center ===
In the spring of 2007, the IUPUI School of Liberal Arts opened the Ray Bradbury Center on the first floor of Cavanaugh Hall. The center consists of an extensive research library and small archive for visiting researchers interested in Ray Bradbury. The primary function of the center is to produce a scholarly journal, The New Ray Bradbury Review, and multi-volume editions of Bradbury's stories, The Collected Stories of Ray Bradbury. The first volume of The Collected Stories of Ray Bradbury was published in April 2011, and covers the years 1938 to 1943. As of 2022, The New Bradbury Review was published in an online, open-source format by the Indiana University Press.

=== The Center for the Study of Religion & American Culture ===
In 1989, the Indiana University Board of Trustees was established as a research unit of the School of Liberal Arts on the fourth floor of Cavanaugh dedicated to researching the between religion and other aspects of American culture. The center also engages in community outreach as a resource for educators, community members, or media interested in American religious history and customs. The center publishes the semiannual scholarly periodical Religion and American Culture: A Journal of Interpretation. The first edition of the journal was published in 1991.

=== Institute for American Thought ===
In January 1975, IUPUI history professor Bernard Friedman established the Center for American Thought and Culture, which quickly changed its name to the Center for American Studies, in Cavanaugh Hall as its first director. In 1983, the Center for American Studies announced a two-year study consisting of three symposia that would assemble 10 to 12 nationally recognized scholars to discuss aspects of American culture and life. The project was funded through a $65,143 grant from the Lilly Endowment. In 2004, the Institute for American Thought was established out of the Center for American Thought and Culture. The center published a newsletter known as the Convergence. The center sponsored several projects including the Charles S. Peirce Papers and the Journal of the Early Republic.

Frederick Douglass Papers

In 1998, the Frederick Douglass Papers project moved from West Virginia University to IUPUI as part of the Institute of American Thought. The project is located on the third floor of Cavanaugh. The project collects, edits, and publishes the writings of Frederick Douglass with the goal to make his materials more accessible to a wider audience.

The Charles S. Peirce Project

The project is an academic research center dedicated to publishing a 20-volume series on the American Philosopher Charles S. Peirce, founder of pragmatism. In 2023, researchers at the Peirce Project have access to 80,000 copies of original manuscripts. The resources of the project include an extensive microform collection of Peirce's manuscripts and the Max H. Fisch Library (a large private collection on classical and American philosophy and on nineteenth- and early twentieth-century American culture) The Charles S. Peirce Project was established on the IUPUI campus on July 1, 1976. The project was originally located on the fifth floor of Cavanaugh Hall. The Peirce Project is an academic unit within the Institute for American Thought.

== Former research centers ==
=== Confucius Institute ===
IUPUI was selected in 2007 to house a Confucius Institute with Professor "Joe" Xu, professor of neuroscience at the IU School of Medicine, as its first director. The Confucius Institute in Indianapolis, sometimes referred to as CI Indy, was an apolitical, non-profit organization established by IUPUI, Sun Yat-sen University in China, and Hanban (The Office of Chinese Language Council International) to promote the teaching of Chinese language and culture in central Indiana.

CI Indy and the Indianapolis Mayor's Office established the annual Chinese Festival of Indianapolis beginning in 2010. The Lilly Chinese Culture Network, Indianapolis Chinese Community Center, Chinese American Society, and other organizations joined with CI Indy to promote Chinese culture and celebrate the Chinese who have made great contributions to the city of Indianapolis.

The Confucius Institute at IUPUI was closed on April 3, 2019, with IU citing financial issues surrounding federal changes to Chinese language programs. Confucius Institutes were criticized by Republic politicians for their alleged efforts to spread communist propaganda. Indiana Representative Jim Banks released a statement saying "The Chinese Communist Party in Beijing knows that U.S. universities are home to important research, some of which involves sensitive national security information funded by U.S. federal departments. By using businesses and cultural exchanges as fronts, the Chinese government infiltrates these institutions and steal our nation's intellectual property and secrets. Thanks to the necessary steps by IUPUI and MIT, more schools are waking up to this reality, and I suspect many more will follow their lead."

=== University Writing Center ===
The University Writing Center (UWC) was founded in 1983 by IU English Professor Barbara Cambridge. The first staff members consisted of English professors and a couple of student tutors. Its initial services included 30-minute writing sessions, a grammar hotline, and writing workshops across all academic departments. In 1990, Cambridge established the Writing Fellows Program, which provided formal writing education for undergraduates. The center is part of the English program at the IU School of Liberal Arts. In 1999, the Writing Center moved from the fifth floor to the third to create more space for writing assistance and mentoring. In the late 1990s, the UWC established satellite centers in University College, now known as Joseph T. Taylor Hall, and the Ball Residence Hall. In 2007, the University Library established the Learning Commons on the second floor, and the UWC moved to occupy part of the space.

=== The Public Opinion Laboratory (POL) ===
The Public Opinion Laboratory was founded in 1986 by IU Sociology Professor, Brian S. Vargus, and located on the fourth floor of Cavanaugh Hall. The laboratory quickly outgrew its original space and moved to a larger space on the second floor to accommodate the increasing student workers. The lab was completely student-run and performed polling for IUPUI and private clients. One example is that The Star contracted the Public Opinion Laboratory to perform all the polling work in the fall political season.

== See also ==
- Indiana University–Purdue University Indianapolis Public Art Collection
