= Mary Ellen Cable =

American educator and activist

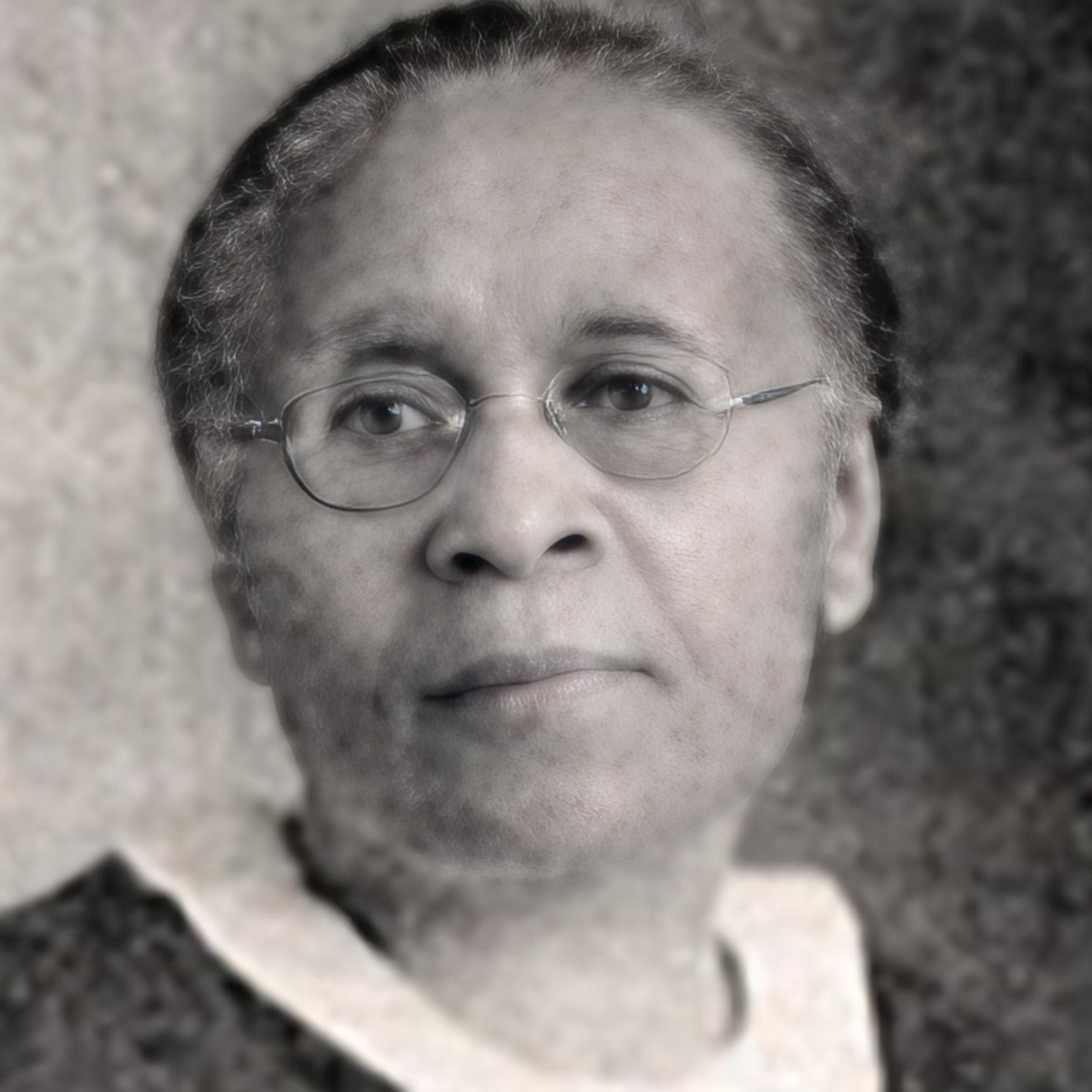
- Born: September 19, 1861; Leavenworth, Kansas, US
- Died: September 18, 1944 (aged 82); Indianapolis, Indiana, US
- Other name: Mary Ellen Montgomery

Mary Ellen Cable was an American educator and activist. She served as an educator and principal of Indianapolis Public Schools no. 4, Indianapolis' first African American elementary school located in the Ransom Place neighborhood during segregation. She also founded Indianapolis' first chapter of the National Association for the Advancement of Colored People (NAACP).

== Early life and education ==
Mary Ellen Cable (née Montgomery) was born in Leavenworth, Kansas, on September 19, 1861. In the 1870s, she earned a degree from Leavenworth Teacher's Normal School allowing her to teach elementary students in Fort Scott and Topeka, Kansas. She went on to marry George Cable, a teacher, and together had one son, Dr. Theodore Cable.

== Career ==
Cable and her family moved to Indianapolis, Indiana, in 1893. George worked as an educator and for the post office while Cable began her 35-year career in Indianapolis Public Schools (IPS). She worked as a teacher, director of practice teaching, and principal at IPS No. 19, 23, 40, 24, and 4. From 1903 to 1905, Cable oversaw the community vegetable garden at School 24, which provided fresh vegetables to the community and sparked residents to plant gardens of their own.

In the 1910s, almost one third of the African American population of Marion County had tuberculosis. Around 1916, in collaboration with the Woman's Improvement Club (WIC) of Indianapolis and other Black women's clubs, Cable established one of the first three "fresh air” classrooms serving Black students in Indianapolis with tuberculosis.

In Cable's 17-year term as director of practice of teaching, 61 African American teachers were certified by the Indianapolis School Board, 5 of which went on to become principals.

Cable would go on to become principal of IPS School no. 4, Indianapolis' first African American elementary school located in the Ransom Place neighborhood from 1922 until her retirement in 1933.

Cable was active in social and civic engagement activities. In 1912, Cable served as president of the Colored Women's Civics Club where she organized the creation of the first NAACP branch for Indianapolis and served as its first president. Under her leadership, the Indianapolis branch expanded in member numbers and led initiatives across the state against the Ku Klux Klan.

Cable was a member of Sigma Gamma Rho sorority, Bethel African Methodist Episcopal (A.M.E) Church and the Browning Literary Society.

== Death and legacy ==
Cable died at the age of 82 on September 19, 1944, after battling an illness for five years.

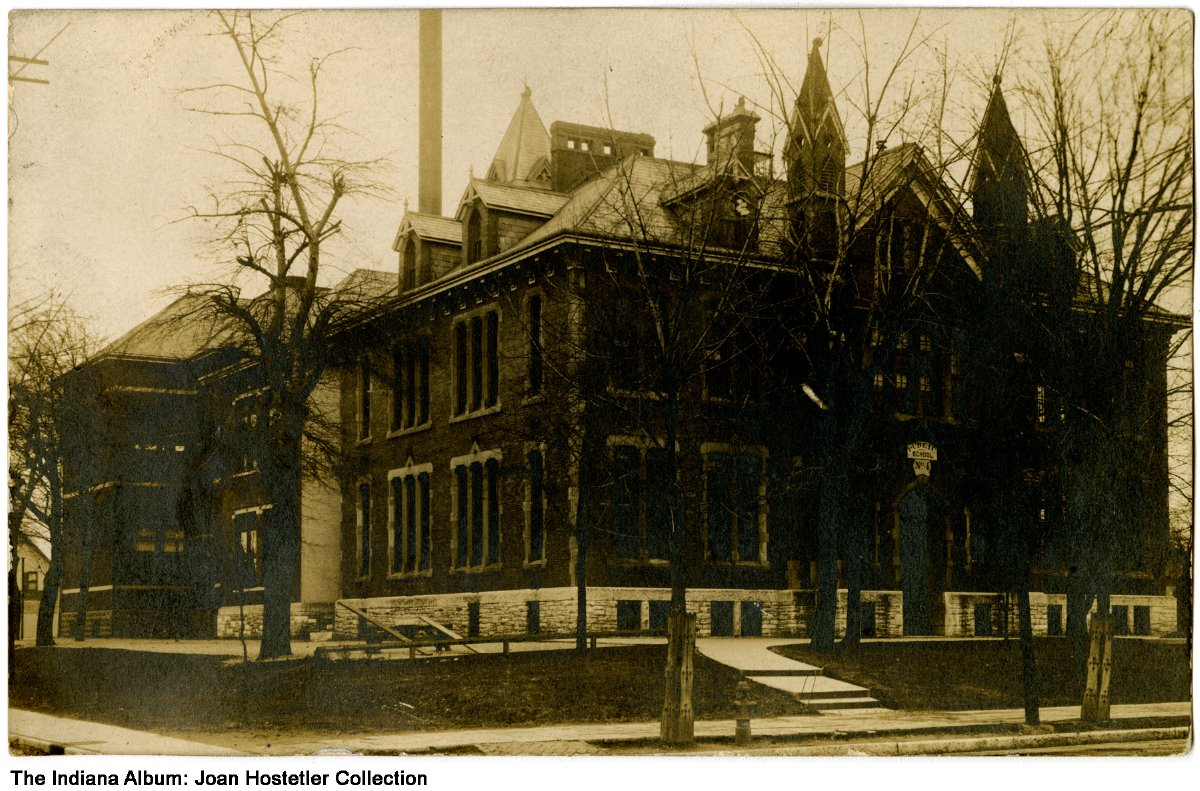
IPS School No. 4, Indianapolis, Indiana, circa 1912

In 1953, IPS School No. 4 was dedicated and named the Mary E. Cable Elementary School. IUPUI would go on to purchase the school after IPS closed the building down in 1980 naming it the Mary E. Cable Building in recognition of Cable's work. In 2006, they demolished the building because of asbestos contamination. IUPUI later named the new student residence hall built in its place the "Cable House".
