= Joseph T. Taylor =

American academic, educator and activist

- Born: Joseph Thomas Taylor; February 11, 1913; Rolling Fork, Mississippi, U.S.
- Died: September 23, 2000 (aged 87)
- Occupations: Academic; educator; activist
- Spouse: Hertha Mae Ward (m. 1944)
- Children: 3, including Meshach

Joseph Thomas Taylor (February 11, 1913 – September 23, 2000) was an American academic, educator and activist who was named dean of Indiana University at the downtown Indianapolis Campus on February 24, 1967. In 1972, he became the first dean of the newly created School of Liberal Arts at Indiana University – Purdue University Indianapolis (IUPUI). He was married to Hertha Ward-Taylor and they had three children: deceased actor Meshach Taylor, Judith F. Taylor and Hussain Taylor.

== Biography ==
Joseph Thomas Taylor was born on February 11, 1913, in Rolling Fork, Mississippi, to Joseph and Willie Ann Taylor. He spent his youth in Memphis, Tennessee and East St. Louis, Illinois. Segregation was in effect in that region and he went to an all-black school until he attended college at Wiley College in Marshall, Texas, where he excelled as a member of the Wiley National Championship Football Team and as a pitcher on the baseball team.

After transferring to the University of Illinois at Urbana-Champaign, Taylor graduated with his Bachelor of Arts degree in 1936 and a Master of Arts degree in 1937. Between the years of 1939 and 1941, he was an instructor at Florida A&M University in Tallahassee. His career continued with his appointment as Area Director for the National Youth Administration from 1941 to 1942.

Taylor was not only a scholar, but also a soldier who fought for his country in World War II. His battalion was committed to combat in the European Theatre of Operations and he fought at the Battle of the Bulge. During his deployment, he documented many of his observations about the horrors of war and detailed his experiences with institutionalized bigotry, racism, and segregation. Soon after he was discharged from the military he married Hertha Mae Ward on February 16, 1944. Their union produced three children: Judith, Hussain, and actor Meshach Taylor (born 1947 – died 2014).

From 1946 to 1950, Taylor worked as assistant to the president at Florida A&M College, a teacher, and an administrator. He received a professorship of Sociology and becoming the Director of the Arts and Sciences at Albany State University in Georgia from 1950 to 1951. After leaving this position, he became the chairman for the division of the Social Sciences Department as a professor of sociology at Dillard University until 1957. Throughout his career and appointments to various committees, Taylor was studying to receive his PhD from Indiana University and did so in 1952. After earning his PhD, he became the acting dean and professor of sociology at Dillard.

On September 23, 2000, Dr. Taylor died. When asked how he managed to serve so many groups in Indianapolis, Taylor replied "I don't know how I manage all that, but I know that if the freedom to assemble is ever taken away, I won't know what to do with myself."

== Awards ==
He received the following awards:

- Boys Club's Horatio Alger Award
- Dr. Joseph Taylor Black Student Union Scholarship Award
- Jefferson Honor Award
- Julius Rosenwald Fellowship

== Contribution to the Flanner House ==
The Flanner House, a settlement house, founded in Indianapolis, Indiana, in 1889, has served the community for more than 110 years. The Flanner House, formerly known as the Flanner Guild, obtained its new name in 1912 after a local mortician, Frank Flanner, donated the first building. In 1957, Joseph Taylor served as a social worker at the Flanner House at the request of the executive director, Dr. Cleo Blackburn. Their stated goal was to help minority people transition from post-slavery life in the South to the North. Many African-Americans are transiting from the South.

Myron Richardson, the current Flanner House Executive Director, says, "The institution developed self-help programs to respond to health, social, educational, and the economical needs of its clients. The overall objective was for its clients, to reach self-sufficiency. During the transition from the South to the North, the Flanner House worked with those who were past sharecroppers, unemployed, and displaced families living in deplorable housing conditions".

In the early 1950s, the Flanner House received acclaim for its "Sweat Equity" Housing Program. The sweat equity concepts of the Flanner House are taught to its recipients canning, industrial laundry skills, domestic worker skills, and by providing a pre-school facility. The Flanner House built more than 175 homes, which are valued at in excess of US$2 million. The owners, in exchange for their down payment, helped with the construction of their own homes and those of their neighbors.

Taylor's association with the Flanner House helped in confronting the desegregation related to education and housing.

The Flanner House now has a learning center program, certified by the National Association for the Education of Young Children, with CDA teachers. It is fully licensed and State of Indiana-approved. In 2002, Flanner House Elementary School was one of the first four K-6 schools with above average ISTEP scores. The 3rd and 6th grade students at FHES scored the highest in the state of Indiana for charter schools.

== IUPUI ==
Taylor was named dean of Indiana University at the downtown Indianapolis Campus on February 24, 1967, and served as acting dean from June of that same year. When the president of Indianapolis University Board of Trustees, Elvis Stahr, named Taylor dean, he stated, "The appointment of Dr. Taylor by the Trustees on our recommendation is a pleasure to announce. It caps a search both within the institution and outside for the best qualified man for this important administrative position in the University."

The Trustees searched for a man that would carry on the campus's two main principles. Stahr included these principles in Taylor's assignment as the new dean. "…to strive to provide higher educational opportunity for students of Marion and surrounding counties who might not otherwise have the resources to pursue study in any college or university and, secondly, to continue both the spirit and the fact of cooperation with the private colleges and universities of the region, as well as with our sister state institutions."

In 1967, Joseph T. Taylor heritage society noted, "His devotion to the creation of an educational environment to meet the needs of widely diverse populations in central Indiana helped shape what is now considered a model in urban higher education-IUPUI. His is truly an important legacy…Through this society we pay tribute to Joseph T. Taylor and recognize the many IU School of Liberal Arts benefactors who share his high ideals and embrace his pursuit of excellence in the study and understanding of our human condition."

While Taylor served as dean of IUPUI, 1967–69, and dean of the Liberal Arts department, 1967–78; he also served as a professor of sociology for IUPUI from 1967 to 1983. In 1983, Taylor became a professor emeritus of Sociology. The Indiana historical society noted:

Taylor was civically engaged and his leadership was regularly sought. He was a recipient of several service awards and four honorary degrees. IUPUI has honored Taylor by attaching his name to an annual symposium and a scholarship. In May 2008, an original IUPUI building housing University College and Multicultural Center was renamed Joseph T. Taylor Hall.

Chancellor Charles Bantz was quoted as saying, "It is fitting that his name be attached to one of our original buildings" since Taylor "was instrumental in implementing the merger that led to the establishment of IUPUI. Dr. Taylor was a pioneer at every stage of his academic career. He infused that 'can-do' spirit and ability to break new ground into [the] very core of what has made IUPUI successful today."

Annette Reynolds, of the Johnson County Daily Journal, interviewed Taylor in 1992. In her article, Professor's tale of two universities, Sociologist helped create IUPUI campus, she stated:

At 79 Taylor is sharp and optimistic…Bringing two universities together in crowded Indianapolis would have been a task for any person, let alone a black man in positions of authority over a mostly white student body in the late '60s. But Taylor claims he has never been hassled with racial problems. "I have always had wonderful cooperation from the faculty and students.
