= IU Indianapolis Campus Center =

Building in Indianapolis, Indiana, U.S.

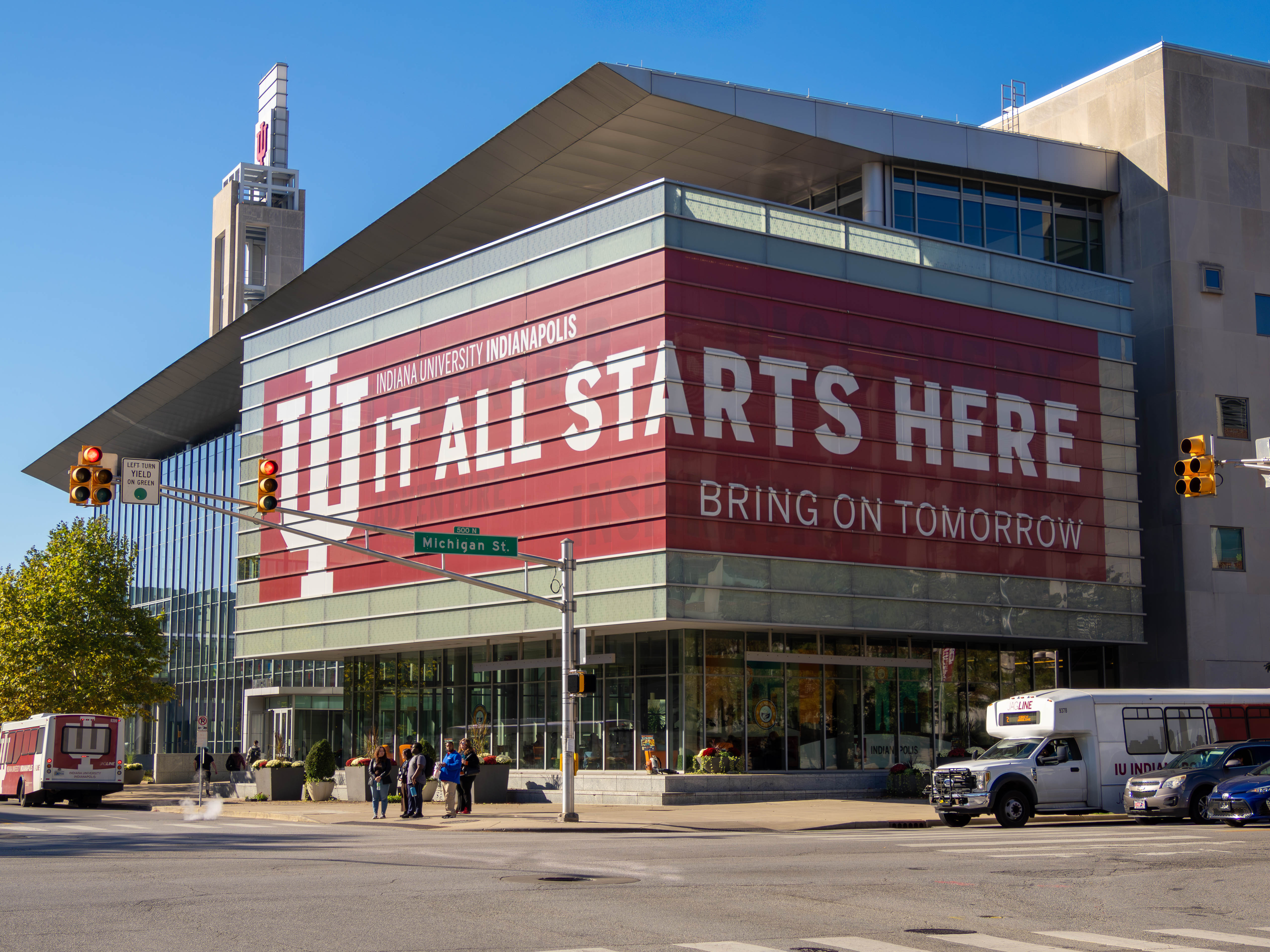
- Campus Center looking southwest, 2025

General information
- Architectural style: Modern
- Location: 420 University Blvd., Indianapolis, Indiana, 46202
- Coordinates: 39°46′26″N 86°10′34″W
- Groundbreaking: 2005
- Completed: 2008
- Affiliation: Indiana University Indianapolis

Design and construction
- Architect: SmithGroup/Ratio Inc.

The IU Indianapolis Campus Center functions as the on-campus hub of student activities with areas for social activities, dining, and essential administrative offices for academic life. The center marks the completion of the vision for a dedicated student building on the Indianapolis campus beginning in with the creation of IUPUI in 1969. Surrogates for the building have included Robert E. Cavanaugh Hall, Joseph T. Taylor Hall, and the IU Student Union Building.

== History ==
=== Initial Site ===
The IU Indianapolis Campus Center is built on the site of the former Bowers Building and Veterans Affairs Office Building. The Bowers Building was home to the Bowers Envelope Company before IUPUI formed and acquired the property. The Veterans Affairs Office Building was established in late 1974 when they moved to the old Real Estate Building, also known as the Real Estate House.

Demand for a dedicated campus center began to gain momentum in 1977 following the decline of student space in the Union Building and Cavanaugh Hall. Construction of the IUPUI Campus Center began following the demolition of the Bowers Building.

=== Project 2000 ===
Originally referred to as the IUPUI Student Center, the plans for a dedicated campus center were revealed in 1997 and titled “Project 2000.” The project planned to house the new campus bookstore and various student-related administrative offices such as the bursar, registrar, and admission office in one central location. At this time, the first floor of Cavanuagh Hall was functioning as the hub for student academic activities on campus.

=== Campus Center ===
Construction for a new student center began in 2006 with the groundbreaking of the site in 2005. The IU Indianapolis Campus Center was completed on January 1, 2008, and was formally dedicated on April 9. The student center was designed by SmithGroup/Ratio Inc. and won national awards: the Honor Award for Excellence in Design from the American Institute of Architects, Maryland State component and the Award of Excellence for Institutional Architecture from American Institute for Architects, Northern Virginia. Greiner Brothers, Inc. was responsible for constructing the HVAC and mechanical systems.

The four-story Campus Center was constructed under the tenure of Charles R. Bantz, fourth chancellor of IUPUI. The new center was created as a new home on campus for students and faculty by providing several restaurant areas and a new area for social activities. The new center replaced the Student Union Building which was demolished shortly after its completion. The center included a brand-new bookstore, credit union, a food court, and other student activities services. The center also features a 20-bell carillon tower with the largest bell having the names of each IUPUI school engraved on it.

In 2010, two interior rooms were renamed to posthumously honor alumnus Yale Pratt (Room 405) and former faculty member Tony Sherrill (Room 409). Pratt was a graduate student in the IU School of Liberal Arts Department of Sociology when he died tragically young. His parents established the Yale Prat Mentoring Fund to provide scholarships for freshmen between the ages of 25 and 35 enrolled in University College at IUPUI. Sherrill was the chair of the Department of Religious Studies, Director of the Center for American Studies, and coeditor of Religion and American Culture: A Journal of Interpretation.

The Campus saw some major updates to the facilities and occupants of the student center in 2018. A brand-new Recreation Center opened on the Theater Level of the Campus Center as a place for students to relax and socialize in their free time. The Paws’ Pantry moved into the Campus Center as part of a new initiative to address food inequality in the community. The pantry works with Campus Kitchen partners to reduce food waste while providing for Indianapolis community members. The food court was renovated to add additional food options and increase the total seating capacity for students and faculty.

In 2019, IUPUI celebrated its 50th anniversary with the opening of the “Faces of IUPUI” in the Cultural Arts Gallery at the IUPUI Campus Center. The exhibition displayed the faces of IUPUI leaders and members who helped define the campus as a reputable institution. A specific focus was placed on the changing landscape of the urban campus with new buildings, installations of art, and community outreach.

== Architecture ==
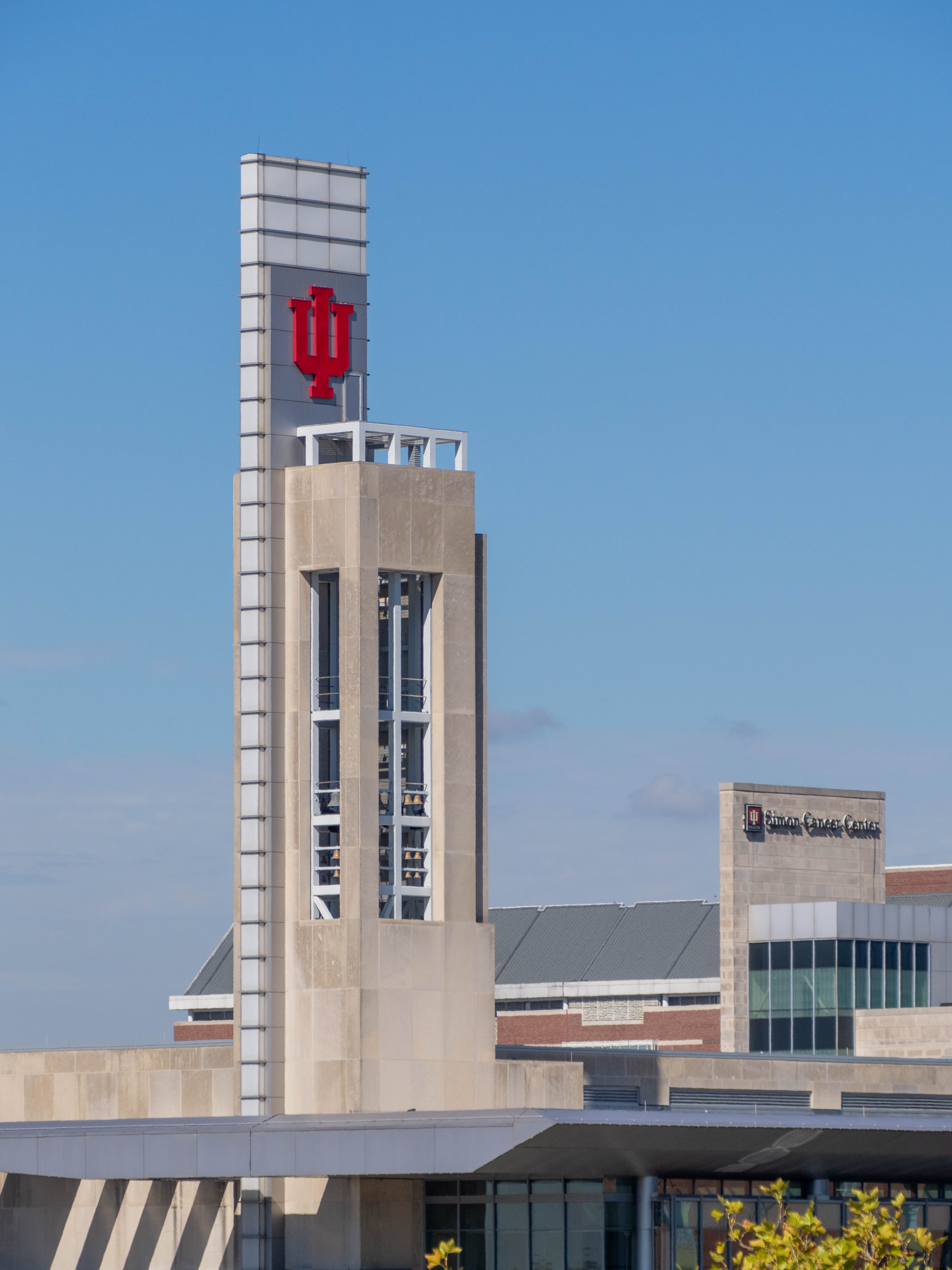
Campus Center bell tower, 2025

The IU Indianapolis Campus Center is located at the geographic center of the campus on the corner of W. Michigan Street and University Boulevard. The building is the focal point of the campus, with a large distinguishable modern bell tower. Exterior materials include limestone at the Vermont and Michigan Street facades, with large expanses of glass facing University Boulevard. Brick and metal were used for subsidiary facades and structural detailing. The main façade is a four-story glass curtain wall. A three-story glass cube projects forward from the main façade at the northeast corner which contains the campus bookstore. The southeast corner contains a concrete and steel tower, which serves as a bell tower.

== Cultural Arts Gallery ==
The IUPUI Cultural Arts Gallery was first created in 1997 and moved to the Campus Center once it opened in 2008. The gallery showcases art by, or is of interest to, students of IU Indianapolis. The Cultural Art Gallery is located in room 148 of the Campus Center and is open year-round.

== See also ==
- Indiana University–Purdue University Indianapolis Public Art Collection
