= William M. Plater =

American higher education consultant (born 1945)

William Marmaduke Plater (born July 26, 1945) is an American higher education consultant and Indiana University Chancellor's Professor Emeritus of Public Affairs, Philanthropy, and English, and Executive Vice Chancellor and Dean of the Faculties Emeritus at Indiana University-Purdue University Indianapolis (IUPUI).

== Early life and education ==
William M. Plater was born in East St. Louis, Illinois, United States. Plater attended the University of Illinois at Urbana Champaign from 1963 to 1973, earning a baccalaureate (1967), master's (1969), and PhD (1973), all in English literature. Plater met his future wife, Gail Maxwell, at the University of Illinois. They married in 1971 and had two children. They reside in Indianapolis, Indiana.

== University of Illinois at Urbana-Champaign ==
Plater worked for the College of Liberal Arts and Sciences from 1967 until 1983. As research assistant and assistant to the dean, he wrote a monograph, Man and the Multitude (1967), for the College to commemorate the 100th anniversary of the university. He created an annual senior survey and conducted research on student satisfaction; he authored A Vocational Guide to the Liberal Arts and Sciences, published by the College in 1970 and widely disseminated to students for several years. As assistant to the dean and assistant dean, Plater joined art professor Billy Morrow Jackson in supporting the Special Education Opportunities Program by establishing a course designed for a large number of African American students recruited to the university following the assassination of Martin Luther King Jr. The course enrolled several hundred students and Plater served as instructor. Offered from 1970–77, the course was based on an annual lecture series of prominent African American leaders. Plater also served on several campus committees considering a range of educational reforms and was one of the founders of Unit One established in 1973, serving as assistant director in 1971-72 and then acting director in 1972-73. One of the nation's first “experimental” colleges integrating learning with residential facilities, Unit One has remained in continuous operation for over 40 years, now serving over 600 students a year. The University of Illinois Archives maintains the “William Plater Papers 1968-73” in its collection documenting the formation of Unit One and the lecture series. Plater served as assistant director (1974–1977) and associate director (1977–83) of the School of Humanities, where he played the lead administrative role in establishing the Cohn Scholars Program in 1978 and in 1981 the Unit for Criticism and Interpretive Theory. During a period of significant decline in graduate enrollments in the humanities nationwide, Plater played a central role in working with department leaders and School officials to accommodate major changes in graduate programs and budgetary reductions. He left UIUC in 1983 for Indiana University.

== Indiana University-Purdue University Indianapolis (IUPUI) ==
Plater was appointed Professor of English and Dean of the Indiana University School of Liberal Arts at IUPUI in 1983. He served as Dean of the Faculties at IUPUI from 1987 to 1988, when he also assumed the title and responsibilities of the Executive Vice Chancellor. IUPUI was established in 1969 as the merger of the IU Schools of Medicine, Dentistry, Nursing, and Law with the extension campuses of Purdue University and Indiana University in Indianapolis. Plater served as the chief academic officer for over half of its existence by the time he left the position in 2006, after 19 years. During this period, Plater is credited with articulating a vision for the development of the campus, which enjoyed significant growth in enrollments, student retention, degree programs, externally funded research, and national recognition for innovations in undergraduate education, community engagement, internationalization, and applications of technology to learning. In his history of IUPUI, Ralph Gray wrote in 2003 that “This truly remarkable, visionary, and comprehensive document, the IUPUI Development Plan, 1988-2000, set what may at the time have been seen as impossibly high standards and goals, but its theme and its promises have been followed and, for the most part, achieved.” Plater served under the leadership of Gerald L. Bepko, Chancellor from 1986 until 2003, when Bepko became Interim President of Indiana University and Plater was appointed Acting Chancellor.

From 2006 to 2010, Plater was appointed Chancellor's Professor of Public Affairs, Philanthropy, and English and Director of the Workshop on International Community Development, a program sponsored by the IU Center on Philanthropy (now the Lilly Family School of Philanthropy) and the IU School of Public and Environmental Affairs. The Workshop was designed to coordinate IUPUI international activities with those of the greater Indianapolis community and to apply university knowledge, expertise, and experience to the growing internationalization of the region's economic, social, cultural, and educational development.

Plater's principal achievements at IUPUI include: creation of a major collaboration with Ivy Tech Community College under the Passport Program that contributed to the College's establishment as an accredited statewide community college, creation of University College, formation of Integrated Technologies (that combined academic and administrative computing with telecommunications, as the predecessor to the university-wide University Information Technology Services, development of the IUPUI University Library, and creation of the Office of Professional Development, the Center for Service and Learning, the Office of International Affairs, Center on Philanthropy, Senior Academy, Community Learning Network, Solution Center, and Public Health (Fairbanks School of Public Health). In support of the development of IUPUI, Plater was the co-director (with Deborah Freund) of a Lilly Endowment $8 million grant for “Improved Graduation from Public Universities” (1997–2002) and a $3.2 million grant from the Pew Charitable Trust (with Margaret Miller and Barbara Cambridge) for “Quality Assurance at Urban Public Universities” (1998–2001). Committed to serving adult learners, Plater was a strong advocate of programming to accommodate working and returning students. He was a member of the board of directors of the Council on Adult and Experiential Learning (CAEL), from 1995 to 2009, serving as chair in 2005-2007. Plater's role in developing IUPUI was recognized by Governor of Indiana Mitch Daniels with the state's highest award, the Sagamore of the Wabash in 2006, by IUPUI in establishing the annual Plater Institute on the Future of Learning, and by Indiana University awarding him the Thomas Hart Benton Medal in 1988.

== Community engagement ==
At its establishment in 1969, IUPUI was a loose federation of schools, some of sponsored by Purdue (science, technology, and engineering) and the rest by IU; some were mature and large (such as medicine or dentistry); some had very recently been private schools (law, physical education, and art); some were jointly administered with counterparts on the IU Bloomington campus (business, public affairs, and education); five were system-wide schools, with programs on each of IU's eight campuses, and several were located in different sites scattered around the city and even as far away as Columbus, Indiana, a city nearly 50 miles away. A sense of identity and common purpose were major issues for the new campus. Plater played the central role in identifying community engagement based on community-based learning (as inherent in professional fields such as medicine, education, or social work) as the unifying concept that quickly became a differentiating characteristic of the campus. With the creation of the Center for Service and Learning in 1993, IUPUI emerged as a national leader in community engagement, winning the inaugural President's Award for exceptional community service in 2006 awarded by the Corporation for National and Community Service. Plater oversaw the development of a special partnership with an adjacent neighborhood, receiving a grant of $800,000 from Housing and Urban Development for a Community Outreach Partnership Center, which in turn won several national awards for its engagement activities. The campus has also won numerous additional awards, including the Carnegie Foundation's community engagement classification in 2006 and again in 2015.

In recognition of Plater's leadership, the American Association of State Colleges and Universities in 2006 established the William M. Plater Award for Leadership in Civic Engagement, the only national award for chief academic officers. IUPUI established the William M. Plater Civic Engagement Medallion, also in 2006, to recognize outstanding graduates at baccalaureate through PhD levels for their community service. Plater was one of the inaugural members of the national advisory panel for the Carnegie Classification for Community Engagement. Plater was recognized with the “Spirit of Philanthropy” Award for community engagement work in 2009 and by Mayor of Indianapolis Bart Peterson with the Mayor's Community Service Award in 2006. In Indiana, he served his community through memberships on several boards, including the internationally renowned Children's Museum, the Indiana Humanities Council, The Indiana Repertory Theater, Metropolitan Indianapolis Public Broadcasting, and the American Red Cross of Greater Indianapolis.

== Educational technology ==
Anticipating the convergence of information and computing technologies (academic and administrative), Plater led in the reorganization of these service units into an integrated technologies unit at IUPUI and championed the development of a library information system that propelled the IUPUI University Library into an international leadership role in digital information resources. Plater authorized the creation of the IUPUI Cyber Lab, which in turn produced several major learning technologies, including OnCourse (1996) that became the foundation for Sakai, ANGEL Learning (2000) that was acquired by Blackboard in 2009, Epsilen (2010) that was acquired by The New York Times and sold to ConnectEDU in 2012, and Course Networking (2012). Plater served as Senior Consultant for Higher Education Strategies at Epsilen and on the NYT Epsilen board (2010–2011), Senior Advisor for Education Strategies at Course Networking (2011–2012), and the Course Networking advisory board (2014 -). Plater provided administrative leadership for the creation of the New Media Program that was incorporated into the IU School of Informatics in 2006 as a foundational program. Plater arranged for the creation of the Global Classroom at IUPUI to facilitate transnational learning opportunities using evolving forms of communication technologies. Plater has written extensively on the impact of technology on student learning. In 2010, Purdue University awarded Plater an Honorary Doctor of Humane Letters for his role in promoting the effective use of technology in learning.

== International higher education ==
Over a period of 20 years, Plater led the establishment and expansion of the Office of International Affairs at IUPUI into one of the nation's exemplars of internationalization among urban serving universities, a role recognized with the Institute of International Education Andrew Heiskell Award for Innovation in International Education in 2009 for its strategic partnerships. Plater's role was recognized in 2006 with the establishment of the Plater International Scholars Program. Plater led the Center on Philanthropy international programs from 2006 to 2010, developing extensive relationships with foundations, academic centers, and nonprofit programs in several nations including China, Egypt, Thailand, and Kenya. IU awarded the John W. Ryan Award for Distinguished Contributions to International Programs to Plater in 2009. Plater's work in international philanthropy was recognized by the National Institute of Development Administration’s awarding of an Honorary Doctor of Philosophy in Development Administration presented by Her Royal Highness Princess Maha Chakri Sirindhorn of Thailand in 2010. Serving as a Commissioner of the Western Association of Schools and Colleges Senior Accrediting Commission, Plater led the Commission's expansion of its international programs, resulting in a policy decision to accept applications from institutions in other nations. Plater then joined the WASC staff as Senior Advisor for International Affairs, serving from 2012 to 2014.
