= Theodore Cable =

Indianapolis politician

Theodore Cable was an athlete, dentist, and state legislator in Indiana. He represented Indianapolis in Marion County in 1939 and was a Democrat.

His mother Mary Ellen Cable was an educator and civil rights organizer. George Cable was his father. Theodore Cable graduated from Shortridge High School, Harvard College, and Indiana University School of Dentistry.

He was a member of the Advisory Defense Council "representing negroes" during World War II.

He graduated from Harvard College where he was a distinguished athlete.

== See also ==
- List of African-American officeholders (1900–1959)
