= University Hall (Indiana University) =

General information
- Address: 301 University Blvd., Indianapolis, Indiana 46202-5146
- Coordinates: 39°46′19.660″N 86°10′30.216″W
- Completed: 2015
- Affiliation: Indiana University-Purdue University Indianapolis

Design and construction
- Architect(s): Ratio Architects, Inc.

University Hall at Indiana University is located at the corner of New York Street and University Boulevard and is home to the IUPUI Administration, Indiana University Foundation, Lilly Family School of Philanthropy, and the Indiana University School of Social Work. The building is located south of the Indiana University Indianapolis Lecture Hall and to the west of the Education and Social Work Building.

== History ==
University Hall was constructed in 2015 at the cost of $23 million and designed by Ratio Architects. The building holds classroom and office space for the School of Philanthropy, School of Social Work, and the IU Foundation. The groundbreaking ceremony took place in February 2014. The construction of the new University Hall would replace the old Administration Building, and, subsequently, its demolition.

In 2023, University Hall created a new mental wellness resource room on the second floor as a place where faculty and students can go to relax and decompress. The room included snacks, cushioned furniture, yoga mats, fidget toys, and educational materials about dealing with stress. The room was created by the IU School of Social Work, the IU School of Social Work Alumni Association, and the Indianapolis Zen Center.

== See also ==
- Indiana University–Purdue University Indianapolis Public Art Collection
