= Indiana University North Residence Hall =

University residence hall in Indianapolis, Indiana, US

North Residence Hall
- Interactive map of the North Residence Hall area

General information
- Location: 820 W North St, Indianapolis, IN 46202
- Coordinates: 39°46′34.194″N 86°10′22.1412″W
- Completed: 2016
- Affiliation: Indiana University-Purdue University Indianapolis

Design and construction
- Architect: MKSTD Architects

Indiana University North Residence Hall is located at 820 W North Street in Indianapolis, Indiana, U.S., on the Indiana University Indianapolis campus. Often referred to as North Hall, it is the first traditional student residence facility constructed on the Indianapolis campus since 1969.

== History ==
In December 2014, the IU Board of Trustees approved the design of a new residence hall to be located on North Street. The North Hall was and designed by MSKTD Architects and construction was completed in August 2016. The new 172,000-square-foot (16,000 m^{2})student residence has a capacity of 700 beds and cost a total of $45.2 million. The residence offers single rooms, singles with bathrooms, and double rooms for students. The building also features a computer lab, student lounges, a game room, fitness center, laundry room, and two classrooms. North Hall differs from other campus residence halls by offering rooms for freshmen and sophomores instead of only first-year students.

== Architecture ==
The North Residence Hall consists of two residential wings, four and six stories respectively, and features a modern design complementary to downtown Indianapolis. The building has achieved a LEED Silver Certification with high marks in sustainable sites. Architectural design was supported by KWK Architects. The hall contains nineteen 37-resident houses with a mix of traditional single and double occupancy rooms and small community bathrooms, and each house has a glass-enclosed lounge. Powers & Sons Construction and Messer Construction partnered on the "construction manager as constructor" (CMc) project, and managed all field operations and logistics.

== See also ==
- Indiana University–Purdue University Indianapolis Public Art Collection
