= Ali Jafari =

American computer scientist

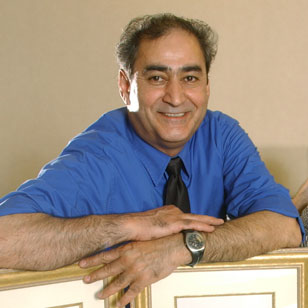
- Ali Jafari in 2004
- Born: Isfahan, Iran
- Occupations: Professor of Computer and Information Technology, Director of CyberLab, Founder and CEO of Course Networking (theCN.com)
- Website: thecn.com/aj10

Ali Jafari (Persian: علی جعفری) is a serial entrepreneur who is well known for his research and entrepreneurship in the area of Information Technology (IT), more specifically, on development of a series of "Learning Management System(s)" (LMS). Dr. Jafari is currently working as a Professor of Computer and Information Technology at the Purdue School of Engineering and Technology and Director of the CyberLab at Indiana University-Purdue University Indianapolis (IUPUI). He continues to bring innovation and new perspectives to the smart learning environment industry to make teaching and learning easier and more powerful.

Ali Jafari earned his BS in Business Administration from the University of Isfahan, Iran, before he moved to the United States to pursue a MS in Media Technology at the University of Wisconsin. He completed doctorate studies in Telecommunications/Mass Communication from Indiana University in Bloomington, Indiana. Since then, Jafari has envisioned, created and commercialized four major software systems, which are competing among a dozen internationally known LMS products such as Blackboard, Moodle, Desire2Learn, etc. Jafari's projects included Indiana University's (1999) Oncourse (now Sakai), ANGEL Learning Management System (2000), Epsilen Environment, and CourseNetworking, LLC or theCN.com (2011).

In less than a decade, ANGEL was acquired (May 2009) by Blackboard for $100 million. By forming a partnership and securing venture capital from The New York Times Company, Epsilen became one of the fastest growing IT companies headquartered in Indianapolis in 2008. His most recent company, CourseNetworking, LLC (The CN) began in 2011 with seed funding from Indiana University and Dr. Jafari.

== Research and Interests ==
Recognized as a founding “Father of LMS”, Dr. Jafari has contributed to three books, co-editing and authoring Handbook of Research on ePortfolios, Designing Portals and Course Management Systems for Learning: Beyond Accidental Pedagogy. He has presented papers and delivered keynote addresses in over a hundred national and international conferences. His research has been published in professional and scholarly journals ' on a variety of subjects in information technology. His research interests include user interface design, smart learning environments, distance learning, and intelligent agents both from conceptual and architectural perspectives. In order to tackle real life problems, he was quoted as saying, "It would be progress if higher education were to put a greater emphasis on commercialization of discoveries—perhaps even assigning commercialization the same level of importance as getting published and attracting grants”.
