= Joseph T. Taylor Hall =

- Interactive map of the Joseph T. Taylor Hall area
- Former names: Blake Street Library University Library University College Building
- Alternative names: Taylor Hall

General information
- Architectural style: Modern
- Location: 815 W Michigan St., Indianapolis, IN 46202-5164
- Coordinates: 39°46′23.61″N 86°10′26.61″W
- Named for: Joseph T. Taylor
- Completed: 1971
- Affiliation: Indiana University-Purdue University Indianapolis

Design and construction
- Architects: Reid, Thompson, Boots & Associates Inc.

Joseph T. Taylor Hall was first constructed as part of the first academic buildings following the formation of Indiana University–Purdue University Indianapolis (IUPUI) in 1969. Indiana University expanded its urban education offerings beyond the medical campus with the establishment of the University Quarter, which was the original site of non-medical education programs on the downtown campus. Taylor Hall was constructed as the first university library but would transition roles multiple times throughout its lifetime. Beginning in 1998, Taylor Hall has served as the center for undergraduate education assistance and advisement on campus.

== History ==
=== Blake Street Library (University Library) ===
Taylor Hall, first known as the Blake Street Library or Central Library, was built in 1971 and designed by Reid, Thompson, Boots & Associates Inc. The basement of the library contained a student café known as the Hideaway to expand student food options on campus. In 1974, the hideaway café was renovated to improve its facilities. Computers were installed in the Blake Street Library to replace temporary facilities in Robert E. Cavanaugh Hall and provide students with technology access. A book safeguard program was established at the Blake Library with the addition of an alarm system and auto-locking shutter gate at the entrance to the library. The library added a microfilm catalog of Bloomington card files to further modernize the urban library. The microfilm project was completed the following year to improve the interlibrary loan process by creating cards that covered items located at the various IU campus libraries.In September 1975, IUPUI established an archives office on the third floor of the Black Street Library. The new archives began collecting, preserving, and indexing old Purdue and IU operation materials. The archives reached out to every club, organization, and institute for materials that cover the history of IUPUI. The Student Union Building opened the Gingerbread House in the Hideaway Café to provide more options for baked goods. In 1976, the Blake Street Library had an Ohio College Library Center (OCLC) terminal installed to connect it with over 450 libraries across the United States.

The IUPUI Archives opened its doors on February 20, 1976, with the Heller Collection being one of its first major acquisitions from outside the university. In April 1976, the Office of Student Services moved from the Administration Building to the basement of Blake Street Library. The lounge area adjacent to the Hideaway Café was renovated into office space including a new counseling center for non-academic issues. On November 19, the library added the new self-study learning resource room for students with disabilities. The room included a Visualtek RS-6, two optiscope enlargers, two soundproof modules with braille machines, varispeech tape recorders, and an electronic typewriter. In 1983, the Student Assembly established the Child Enrichment Center in the basement of the Blake Street Library across from the Hideaway Café. The center cared for children of students between the ages of 3 and 9, while parents attended classes for the day. The popular campus venue, Hideaway Café located in the Blake Street Library closed on May 6, 1988. The café was closed to create more space for the University Library and their collection. The closure sparked a backlash from students over the loss of food options and seating space on campus. The completion of the new University Library led to the closing of the Blake Street Library and conversations led to creation of a student center in the former building.

=== Interim Student Activities Center ===
The Blake Street Library would be known as the Old Library Building during its transition to a new role. The IU Trustees confirmed the creation of a student activities center in the former Blake Street Library in February 1994. The proposed draft included a cafeteria, video game arcade, and table games on the lower level; Adaptive Education Services and three student lounges totaling 7,000 square feet on the first floor; the Student Activities Office, Office of Multicultural Student Affairs, and student offices on the second floor; the Undergraduate Education Center and a learning center on the third floor. At this time, the basement was occupied by the Student Assembly, Black Student Union, and the Student Activities Office. The Undergraduate Education Center planned to expand their operations with a learning center for tutoring or assisted learning, and a peer support center to allow other students to assist new students in coursework. In August 1994, the first floor and lower level were planned to open as a student center. No physical changes had been made, but an area had been designated for student organizations to use for meetings. The first floor still contained large study tables, student cubicles, and a lounge area. The lower level contained the UEC learning center, peer tutoring programs, and counseling service programs. However, the student center was delayed due to construction, which sparked backlash from student organizations. An interim student center was opened to appease student backlash until a more permanent center could be built. The student activities center was located on the first floor of the Old Library Building. In September 1996, the Undergraduate Education Center moved to the second and third floors of the building. The estimated cost of renovations was $4.7 million. The second floor consisted of two computer labs, mentor's office spaces, conference rooms, and study tables. The third floor consisted of classrooms, study rooms, the Undergraduate Education Center, the Upward Bound Program, and faculty offices. An enclosure to connect the building with the Business/SPEA building was added to the second floor to facilitate traffic. The glass connector was designed by architect Tom Cheeseman. In 1997, the Wurster Construction Company completed renovations to turn the Old Library Building into an academic hub for campus activities and operations.

=== University College Building ===
In 1998, University College was established in the Blake Street Library and renamed the University College Building. The Undergraduate Education Center was renamed University College as it consolidated in the upper two floors of the Student Activities Center. Most of the remaining programs were moved from the Student Union Building. Student mentoring programs were on the second floor and the new University College administrative and counseling officers were on the third floor. Ratio Architects redesigned the center to create a more individual and collaborative student workspace. The building was rededicated on October 2, 1998, which featured former United States Secretary of Education Richard Riley as one of the keynote speakers. Riley was honored with the Urban University Medal from IUPUI. A tour of the newly renovated University College Building followed the awards ceremony.

In 2001, Mark Minglin, executive director of academic support programs, expanded the services offered at the Bepko Learning Center to include tutoring and success coaching. In 2002, the undergraduate student assembly bought black tables and chairs to be placed around the Taylor Courtyard to make in more hospitable for student activities. The total cost of the chairs and tables was about $20,000. In 2009, the Multicultural Center was officially completed on the first floor of Taylor Hall. An expansion of the Math Assistance Center was also completed later that year.

=== Taylor Hall ===
In 2011, University College was renamed Joseph T. Taylor Hall, simply known as Taylor Hall. In 2016, the second and third floors were replaced over the summer. This includes the HVAC systems, furniture, and electrical outlets. In 2019, the Health and Life Sciences Advising Center moved from Hine Hall to the third floor of Taylor Hall to further consolidate advising activities into a single area. In 2023, a sensory corner was opened in the Adaptive Educational Services conference room in Taylor Hall to create a new space designed for neurodiverse students. The corner was stocked with multi-sensory items to assist overstimulated students. The corner was funded by a “Bridge to the Future Grant”.

== LGBTQ+ Center ==
In 2016, the IUPUI LGBTQ+ Center opened with Tristen Vaught as its first director. The center was first discussed between Chancellor Charles R. Bantz and Vice Chancellor of Diversity, Equity, and Inclusion Karen Dace in 2013 to improve the experience of students and faculty members. In 2014, the IUPUI Climate Survey quantified the LGBTQ+ population on campus, with 14% of students identifying as LGBTQ+. In 2015, IUPUI began improving its inclusivity initiatives by creating all-gender restrooms, trans-inclusive health insurance for workers, and training for the IU police department. The search committee for establishing a center began in the fall of 2015 and concluded in the spring of 2016. The center offers diversity training, education resources, and community outreach programs.

== Multicultural Center ==
The need for a multicultural center was first brought to the attention of IUPUI in 2006 by students who promoted the need for diversity education and multicultural awareness. In 2009, the Multicultural Center opened in Joseph T. Taylor Hall with Zephia Bryant as its first director. Bryant previously served as director of Multicultural Services at McDaniel College in Maryland. In 2016, the LGBTQ+ Center was established out of the Multicultural Center as a separate entity with its own administration.

== Namesake ==
The building was named in honor of Joseph Thomas Taylor. In 1957, Taylor became the director of program development for Flanner House. He served as dean of the Indianapolis Regional Campus from 1967 to 1970 and first dean of the School of Liberal Arts from 1970 to 1978. While serving as dean, Taylor also served as a professor of sociology for IUPUI from 1967 to 1983. Charles Bantz, fourth chancellor of IUPUI, felt that it was fitting for one of the original buildings to be named after Taylor due to his instrumental role in the merger and establishment of IUPUI.

== See also ==
- Indiana University–Purdue University Indianapolis Public Art Collection
