= Indiana University School of Liberal Arts in Indianapolis =

Liberal arts school in Indianapolis, Indiana, US

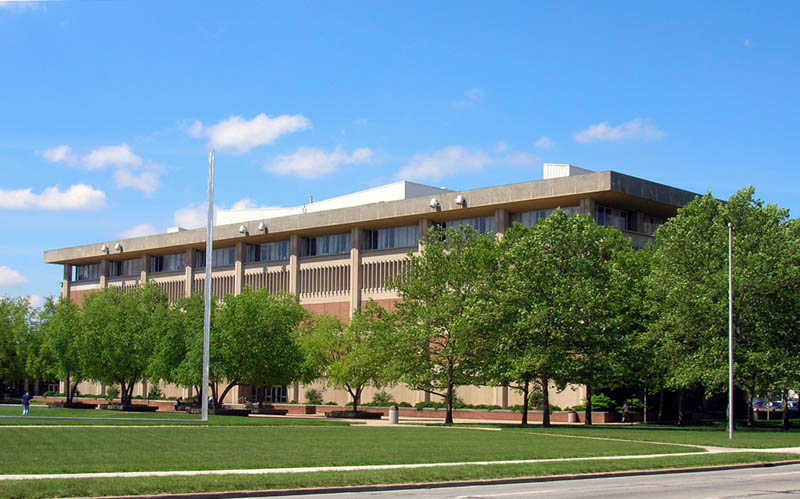
- Cavanaugh Hall is home to the IU School of Liberal Arts in Indianapolis.
- Type: Public
- Established: 1972
- Dean: Tamela Eitle
- Faculty: 230
- Students: 2,000
- Location: Indianapolis, Indiana, USA; 39.773741°N 86.175239°W
- Website: indianapolis.iu.edu/academics/schools/liberal-arts

The Indiana University School of Liberal Arts in Indianapolis is the home of the humanities and social sciences at Indiana University Indianapolis (IU Indianapolis or IU Indy), an urban, research campus. The only liberal arts school in the Indiana University system, the School of Liberal Arts has 11 departments (Anthropology, Communication Studies, Economics, English, Geography, History, Philosophy, Political Science, Religious Studies, Sociology, and World Languages & Cultures), 16 undergraduate degree programs (including those offered in departmental disciplines as well as American Sign Language/English Interpreting, International Studies, Philanthropic Studies, and the Individualized Major Program), and 15 graduate degrees and certificates including Ph.D.s in Economics and Philanthropic Studies. The School of Liberal Arts also houses multiple centers for research and study, some nationally and internationally renowned.

The school had been part of Indiana University–Purdue University Indianapolis (IUPUI) before that school was dissolved in July 2024 and replaced by separate institutions affiliated with the Indiana University and Purdue University systems. Most IUPUI academic programs, including the School of Liberal Arts, were transferred to IU Indy.

== History ==
The origins of the Indiana University School of Liberal Arts in Indianapolis extend to 1891 when the first class was offered in Indianapolis for credit. That course, in economics, was taught by Indiana University professor Jeremiah W. Jenks. The course was so successful that IU followed it with classes in history, sociology, and English. The program was modeled after the "extension movement" pioneered in England in the 1860s by Cambridge University.

Deans of the School of Liberal Arts have included Joseph T. Taylor, William M. Plater, John D. Barlow, Herman Saatkamp, Robert W. White, William Blomquist, and Thomas J. Davis.

== Profile ==
The School of Liberal Arts, in its current form, took shape in 1972, three years after the consolidation of Indiana University and Purdue University programs in Indianapolis as IUPUI. Today, the School of Liberal Arts has more than 230 full-time faculty. In the School of Liberal Arts, there are approximately 2200 undergraduate students and 300 graduate students. Between 2010 and 2014, Liberal Arts faculty received $27,755,795 in external grants and contracts.

== Academic program ==
Hallmarks of the School of Liberal Arts are an emphasis on the undergraduate experience, graduate programs with an applied focus, innovative and creative class offerings and degree programs, small class size and flexible schedules, and the combination of theory with practical application.

== Liberal Arts departments, programs, and centers ==
Departments

- Department of Anthropology
- Department of Communication Studies
- Department of Economics
- Department of English
- Department of Geography
- Department of History
- Department of Journalism and Public Relations
- Department of Philosophy
- Department of Political Science
- Department of Religious Studies
- Department of Sociology
- Department of World Languages and Cultures

Centers and projects

- Center for Economic Education
- Geography Educators Network of Indiana
- Indiana Center for Intercultural Communication (ICIC)
- Institute for American Thought
  - Frederick Douglass Papers
  - Peirce Edition Project
  - Santayana Edition
  - Max Kade German-American Center
  - Center for Ray Bradbury Studies
  - Josiah Royce Edition
- National Council on Public History
- The Polis Center
- Spanish Resource Center
- Center for the Study of Religion and American Culture
- Writing Center

Undergraduate programs

- Africana Studies (B.A.)
- American Sign Language/English Interpreting (Cert./B.S.)
- Anthropology (B.A.)
- Communication Studies (B.A.)
- Economics (B.A.)
- English (B.A.)
- French (B.A.)
- General Studies (B.A.)
- Geographic Information Science (Cert.)
- Geography (B.A.)
- German (B.A.)
- History (B.A.)
- Human Communication in a Mediated World (Cert.)
- Journalism (Cert./B.A.)
- Individualized Major Program (B.A.)
- International Studies (B.A.)
- Latino Studies (Cert.)
- Medical Humanities and Health Studies (B.A.)
- Motorsports Studies (Cert.)
- Museum Studies (Cert.)
- Paralegal Studies (Cert./B.A.)
- Philosophy (B.A.)
- Political Science (B.A.)
- Public Relations (Cert./B.A.)
- Religious Studies (B.A.)
- Sociology (B.A.)
- Spanish (B.A.)
- Theatre and Performance (Cert.)
- Translation Studies (Cert.)

Graduate programs

- Anthropology (M.A.)
- Applied Communication (M.A.)
- Economics (M.A./Ph.D.)
- English (M.A.)
- Geographic Information Science (M.S./Grad Cert.)
- History/Public History (M.A.)
- Health Communication (Ph.D.)
- Museum Studies (M.A./Grad Cert.)
- Philanthropic Studies (M.A./Ph.D.)
- Philosophy (M.A./Grad Cert.)
- Political Science (M.A.)
- Professional Editing (Grad Cert.)
- Public Relations (M.A.)
- Sociology (M.A.)
- Sports Journalism (M.A.)
- Survey Research (Grad Cert.)
- Teaching English to Speakers of Other Languages (Grad Cert.)
- Teaching Spanish (M.A.T.)
- Teaching Writing (Grad Cert.)

Dual Degrees

- Economics-Philanthropic Studies (MA/MA)
- History-Library Science (MA/MLS)
- History-Philanthropic Studies (MA/MA)
- Philosophy-Law (MA/JD)
- Philosophy-Medicine (MA/MD)
