= Indiana University–Purdue University Indianapolis =

Public university in Indianapolis, Indiana, U.S. (1969–2024)

- Other name: IUPUI
- Type: Public research university
- Active: 1969–July 1, 2024
- Parent institution: Indiana University; Purdue University
- Academic affiliations: GCU; CUMU; ORAU; USU; Space-grant
- Endowment: $1.15 billion (2020)
- Chancellor: Latha Ramchand
- Faculty: Over 2,500
- Students: 29,390 (Fall 2020)
- Undergraduates: 20,441 (Fall 2020)
- Postgraduates: 8,171 (Fall 2020)
- Location: Indianapolis, Indiana, United States; 39°46′26″N 86°10′35″W
- Campus: Urban: 536 acres (217 ha)
- Student Newspapers: The Campus Citizen
- Colors: Cream, crimson, and black
- Nickname: Jaguars
- Sporting affiliations: NCAA Division I – Horizon League
- Mascots: Jawz, Jinx, and Jazzy
- Website: www.iupui.edu

Indiana University–Purdue University Indianapolis (IUPUI) (Note: Typically pronounced "I-U-P-U-I" /aɪ juː piː juː aɪ/ with each letter pronounced separately, it is sometimes colloquially pronounced "ooey-pooey" /uːwiː puːwiː/.) was a joint campus of Indiana University and Purdue University in Indianapolis, Indiana, United States, from 1969 to 2024, offering undergraduate, graduate, and professional degrees from both universities. In 2024, IUPUI was split into two separate campuses, namely Indiana University Indianapolis and Purdue University in Indianapolis.

Administered primarily through Indiana University as a core campus and secondarily through Purdue University as a regional campus, it was Indiana's primary urban research and academic health sciences institution. IUPUI was located in downtown Indianapolis along the White River and Fall Creek.

Among more than 550 degree programs, the urban university hosted the primary campuses for both the Indiana University School of Medicine, with more than 2,000 students, and the Indiana University School of Dentistry, the only dental school in the state. Also, the Indiana University Robert H. McKinney School of Law is one of the two Indiana University law schools. After excluding the research budget of the IU School of Medicine, IUPUI was classified among "R2: Doctoral Universities – High research activity."

The IUPUI Jaguars competed in the NCAA's Division I in the Horizon League. Several athletics venues are located on the campus, including the IU Michael A. Carroll Track & Soccer Stadium and Indiana University Natatorium, the largest indoor pool in the United States with a seating capacity of 4,700.

In 2024, when IUPUI was split into two separate campuses, the IUPUI athletic program was transferred to the new IU Indianapolis as the IU Indy Jaguars, inheriting IUPUI's memberships in Division I and the Horizon League.

== History ==
=== Founding ===
In 1968, Maynard K. Hine, dean of the IU School of Dentistry began working with then-Mayor of Indianapolis Richard Lugar, IU President Joseph L. Sutton, Purdue President Frederick L. Hovde, and others to establish IUPUI in 1969 through the merger of the Indianapolis extension programs of both IU and Purdue. Some schools, however, were established before the merger, including the IU School of Medicine, IU School of Dentistry, IU Robert H. McKinney School of Law, IU School of Liberal Arts, and IU Herron School of Art.

The student-run newspaper of the former IU extension campus, the Onomatopoeia, and that of the former Purdue University extension campus, the Component, merged in 1971 to form The Sagamore, which operated until 2009. Archives are available online. That publication was replaced by The Campus Citizen in 2011.

=== Later history ===
IUPUI's research expenditures for fiscal year 2014 totaled $271,093,483 with the federal government as the largest sponsor of the research at 61 percent of the total.

IUPUI CyberLab, a lab in the School of Engineering and Technology that provides research and intellectual support for the design, development, and implementation of innovative educational technology, was established in 1996 by Ali Jafari and funded by William Plater, the Executive Vice-Chancellor of IUPUI at the time. Ali Jafari, David Mills, Brian Ho, and Amy Warner was the first team at the CyberLab to start working on the development of the very first online (based on the Internet) on an Indiana University campus. The team received $160,000 from Indiana University to continue to implement Oncourse for all courses at IUPUI. Starting in 1998, Indiana University - Purdue University was the first IU campus to put all courses online. The CyberLab continued to develop and has now launched several projects, including; Sakai, ANGEL Learning, Epsilen, and the current project called CourseNetworking.

In 2012, the Indiana Commission for Higher Education approved IU's proposal to create what is believed to be the world's first school dedicated to the study and teaching of philanthropy. The school has built on the strengths of the Center of Philanthropy at IU, a pioneer in philanthropy education, research and training. In 2013, the School was named the Indiana University Lilly School of Philanthropy in honor of the Lilly family's philanthropic leadership, as well as their profound contributions to education, research, and the well-being of society.

In 2013, IUPUI opened a School of Public Health named in honor of Richard M. Fairbanks. The Indiana University Richard M. Fairbanks School of Public Health will focus on the areas of urban health, health policy, biostatistics, and epidemiology. Paul K. Halverson was named founding dean of the school.

The Office of Sustainability developed an IUPUI Sustainability Certificate for students.

=== Split ===
On August 12, 2022, the boards of trustees of both Purdue and IU announced that IUPUI would split into two separate universities, with completion of the split finished by the fall 2024 semester. The School of Science is now operated by IU along with its other programs, including business, law, nursing, and social work under Indiana University Indianapolis. The computer science, engineering, and technology programs are now operated by Purdue as the new Purdue University in Indianapolis, a fully integrated extension of its West Lafayette campus. IU added a new computer science programs to its School of Informatics, Computing and Engineering, and Purdue intends to open a branch of its applied research institute on or near the IUPUI campus, and plans to house several other programs in various locations throughout Indianapolis. IU will provide certain administrative services to both academic organizations, and the IUPUI athletic program will transfer to the new IU Indianapolis.

In 2023, Purdue University created a separate tenure system called "University Tenure" for the IUPUI faculty affected by the split, which gave rise to concerns about unequal treatment and potential discrimination. The IUPUI Faculty Council said that IU President Pamela Whitten and Board of Trustees "undermined" shared governance.

== Academics ==
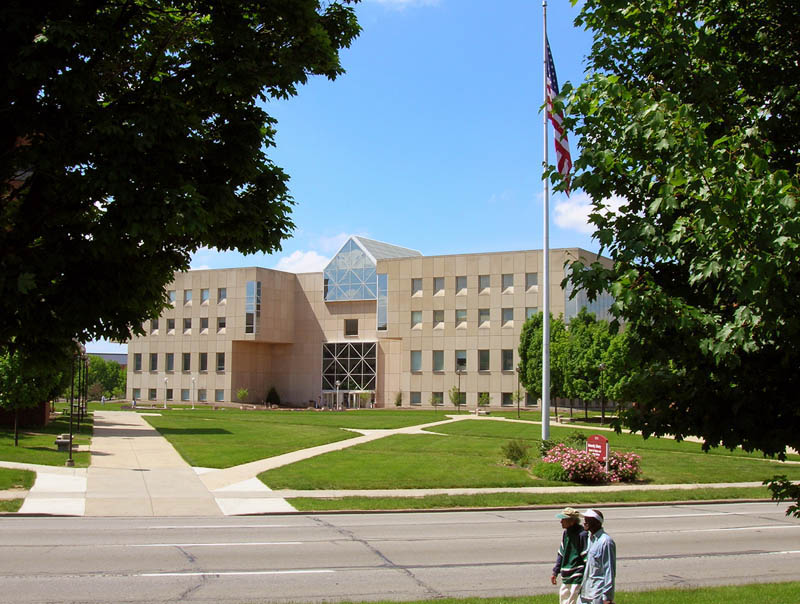
IUPUI University Library

IUPUI was one of nine campuses of Indiana University and one of five campuses of the Purdue University system. The campus offered more than 550 degree programs provided by 17 different schools, two of which are Purdue University schools.

IUPUI had more than 3,800 full-time faculty members. With research funding of more than $629 million in 2024, IUPUI was the second-largest site for research in Indiana.

IUPUI included the nation's largest nursing school, the main campus of the largest medical school in the country, the only dental school in the state, and the country's oldest school of physical education. IUPUI was among the top 20 campuses in the nation for graduate professional degrees conferred.

IUPUI was primarily governed by the IU Board of Trustees. Purdue University degree-granting programs were governed by the Purdue University Board of Trustees. While integrated into the Indiana University system budget, IUPUI was semi-autonomous in that it retains some independent control of its own academic curricula.

College/School	Year founded
Indiana University School of Medicine	1911
Indiana University Indianapolis Extension Center	1916
Indiana University School of Dentistry	1944
Purdue University Indianapolis Extension Center	1946
Indiana University Robert H. McKinney School of Law	1954
Indiana University Herron School of Art

=== Rankings ===
Academic rankings

National
- Forbes: 325
- U.S. News & World Report: 196
- Washington Monthly: 190
- WSJ/College Pulse: 317

Global
- ARWU: 301–400
- U.S. News & World Report: 490

U.S. News & World Report graduate school rankings (2021)
Education	103
Engineering	134
Law	111
Medicine: Primary Care	36
Medicine: Research	42
Nursing: Master's	43
Departmental rankings
Biological Sciences	98
Clinical Psychology	64
Fine Arts	73
Psychology	112
Public Affairs	48
Public Health	147
Social Work	36
Online graduate programs
Nursing	49
Nursing Administration	16
Nursing Education	4

- The U.S. News & World Report 2022 edition of "Best Colleges" ranked the university tied for 196th among national universities and tied for 99th among public universities, tied for 46th in the "Most Innovative Schools" category, 67th in "Best Value Schools", and tied for 114th in "Best Undergraduate Engineering Programs"
- The 2022 Niche College Rankings ranked the university 187th among public universities in America.
- The Washington Monthly 2021 edition of "National University Rankings" ranked the university tied for 190th among national universities.
- The 2021 Academic Ranking of World Universities (ARWU) ranked the university 301st-400th internationally and 90th-110th nationally.
- The 2021 Center for World University Rankings (CWUR) ranked the university 387th internationally and 114th nationally.

== Campus ==
The IUPUI campus covers 536 acres (217 ha) and is located in downtown Indianapolis along the Indianapolis Cultural Trail just two blocks west of the Indiana Statehouse and adjacent to the Canal and White River State Park cultural district. The entire campus is located in the 46202 zip code.

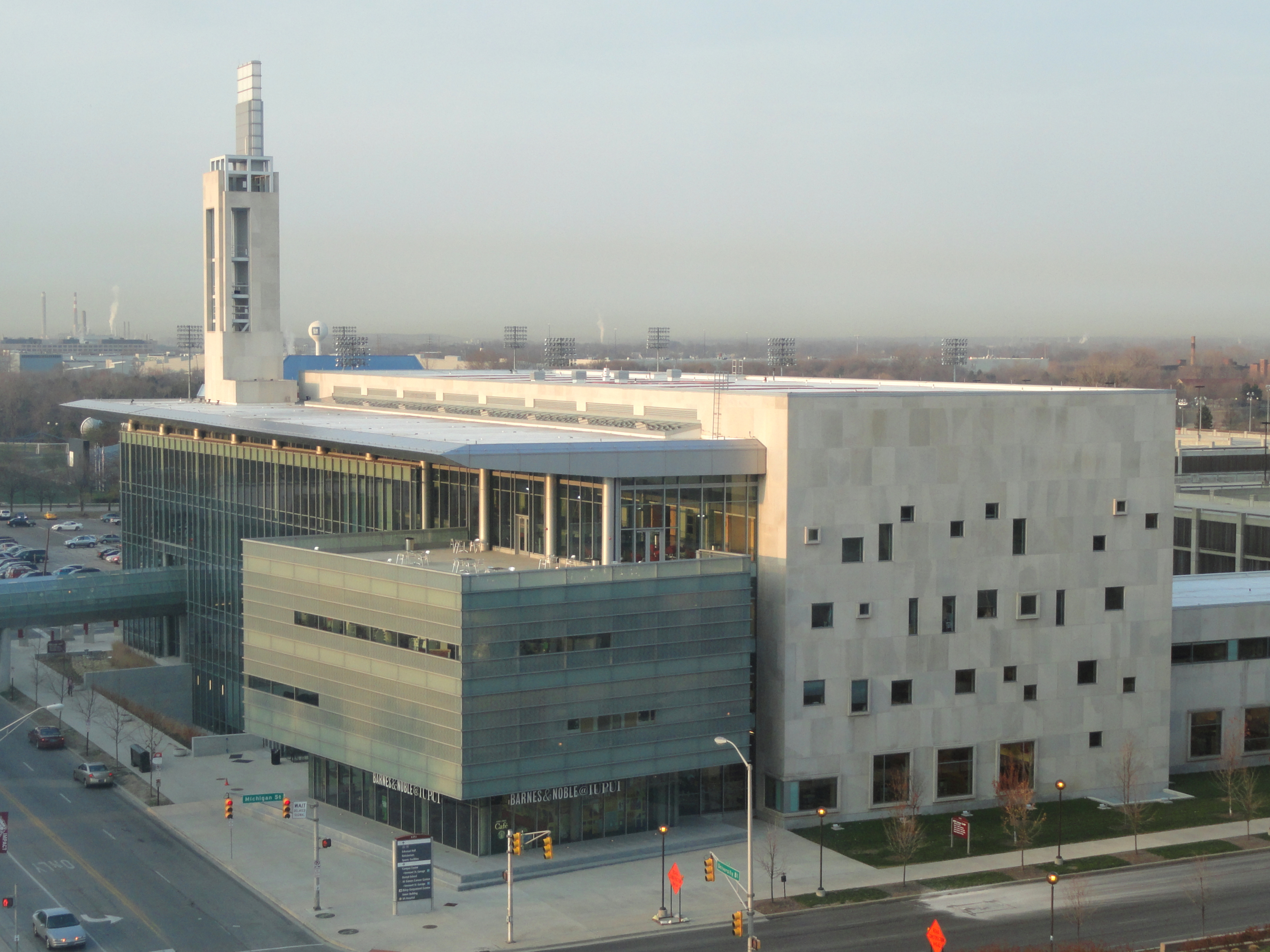
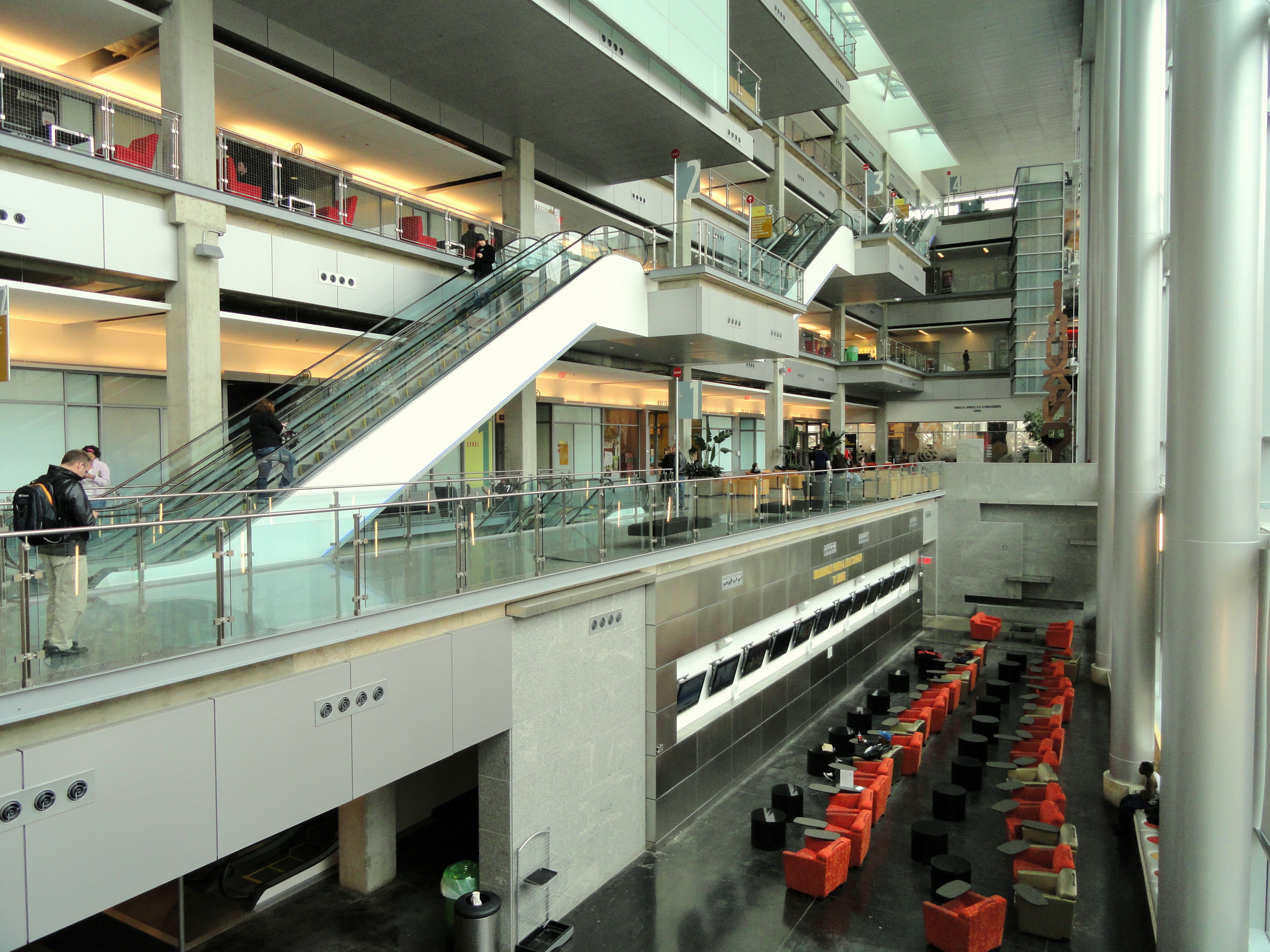
Campus Center

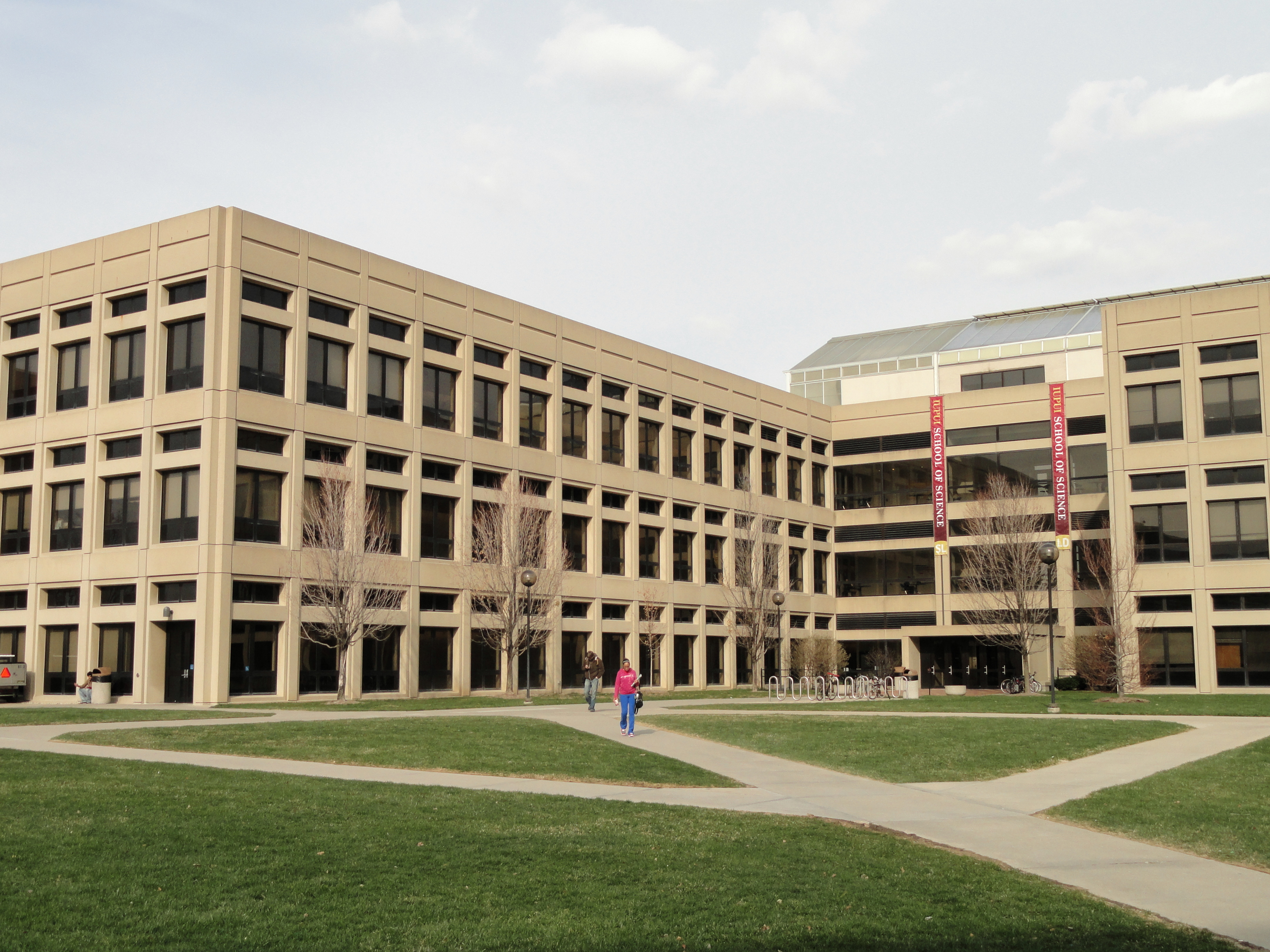
Engineering Science & Technology Building

The campus offers several new buildings including:

- University Hall (opened July 2015) – University Hall is the home of the IU Lilly Family School of Philanthropy and also offers additional space for the IU School of Social Work. It also serves as the home to the IUPUI administration, the IUPUI Office of Alumni Relations, and the IU Foundation.
- Hine Hall (opened January 2013) and University Tower and Tower Dining (opened August 2013) – The former University Place Conference Center and Hotel was transformed into a multi-use facility designed to provide student housing, residential and campus dining and additional classroom space. The conversion of the facility began after nearly a yearlong study of the complex's viability by campus and Indiana University officials. Hine Hall offers 15 additional classrooms, University Tower offers residential space for 560 students and Tower Dining can seat 470 simultaneously.
- Campus Center (opened spring 2008) – The Campus Center is a 179-foot (55 m) bell tower made of limestone and glass. The Campus Center houses Enrollment Services and the Offices of Financial Aid and Student Scholarship, as well as a Barnes & Noble bookstore, cultural arts gallery, game room, movie theater, bank, food court, coffee shop, meeting rooms, study spaces, and more.

The IUPUI campus is home to several nationally renowned hospitals and research entities including Riley Hospital for Children at Indiana University Health, Eskenazi Health, Richard L. Roudebush VA Medical Center, Regenstrief Institute, and the Indiana Clinical and Translational Sciences Institute.

== Student life ==
IUPUI offered student organizations, fraternities and sororities, cultural heritage month celebrations, as well as Division I athletics, Jagapalooza, and others including IUPUI's signature event, The IUPUI Regatta.

With an enrollment of more than 30,000 before its dissolution, IUPUI's student body (undergraduate, graduate/professional) consisted of 56% female and 44% male students, with 89% of students from Indiana. Demographically, the student body was 71% White, 10% African American, 4% Asian/Hawaiian/Pacific Islander, 5% Hispanic, 6% International, 3% two or more races, less than 1% American Indiana/Alaska Native and 1% unknown.

=== Student organizations ===
IUPUI offers more than 400 organizations in which students can get involved. The Spot is a one-stop-shop portal that contains a comprehensive list of student organizations, events, FAQs, and grant information.

=== Student government ===
At IUPUI, there are two recognized university student organizations representing graduate, professional, and undergraduate students.

- Undergraduate Student Government, which consists of elected executive officers and student representatives from student organizations serving as liaisons to the student body, campus partners, and university officials.
- Graduate and Professional Student Government, are elected executive officers from the General Assembly and each academic school as representatives that serve the graduate and professional student experience.

=== Fraternity and sorority life ===
IUPUI is home to more than twenty fraternities and sororities. Student membership has tripled since fall 2010.

=== Service learning ===
Through the Center for Service & Learning and Division of Student Affairs, IUPUI gives students the opportunity to volunteer on campus and in the Indianapolis community through numerous campus-wide service and civic engagement events. During the 2014–2015 academic year, 8,750 students participated in 303,061 hours of service to 438 community partners.

=== Campus recreation ===
Campus Recreation provides activities that facilitate healthy lifestyles for a diverse population of students, faculty, and staff at IUPUI. Membership provides access to swimming at the world-class IU Natatorium, fitness classes, three weight and fitness rooms, recreational open gym, access to the new IUPUI Outdoor Recreational Complex (outdoor basketball courts) and participation in the intramural program, which includes basketball, broomball, dodgeball, flag football, golf, inner tube water polo, kickball, racquetball, soccer, softball, ultimate Frisbee and volleyball.

=== Athletics ===
Before IUPUI was dissolved, the IUPUI Jaguars competed at the NCAA Division I level in the Horizon League in 16 men's (7) and women's (9) sports. The Jaguars have earned NCAA Tournament bids in volleyball, NCAA Division I Men's Soccer Championship, women's soccer, men's golf, NCAA Men's Division I Basketball Championship and women's tennis, as well as The Summit League championship in volleyball, men's tennis and women's soccer. Nine athletes have been recognized as Summit League Athletes of the Year, with seven coaches earning Coach of the Year honors. Prior to 1995, IUPUI athletic teams were known as the Metros and competed in NCAA Division II.

IUPUI is home to the Indiana University Natatorium, host of numerous national swimming championships including the 2016 U.S. Olympic Team Trials-Diving, and the IU Michael A. Carroll Track & Soccer Stadium, host of the 1987 Pan American Games, the 2006 and 2007 USA Outdoor Track & Field Championships, and several NCAA Championships. Additionally, the stadium serves as the home field for the Indy Eleven soccer team of the USL Championship.

Upon the split of IUPUI in 2024, the IUPUI athletic program transferred to the new IU Indianapolis with an athletic brand name of IU Indy.

== Indiana University–Purdue University Columbus (IUPUC) ==
Closely affiliated with IUPUI, Indiana University–Purdue University Columbus was established in 1970 and is located one hour south of Indianapolis in Columbus, Indiana—an area known for its collection of modern architecture with an estimated population of more than 45,000. The growing campus serves more than 1,700 undergraduate and graduate students who live primarily in Bartholomew, Brown, Decatur, Jennings Jackson, Johnson, Ripley, and Shelby counties and offers a broad range of undergraduate degree programs in business, communication studies, elementary education, English, general studies, mechanical engineering, nursing, psychology, and sociology, as well as two graduate degree programs – Master of Business Administration and Master of Arts in Mental Health Counseling. IUPUC is administered through IUPUI as a regional campus.

By July 1, 2024, IUPUC transitioned completely to Indiana University Columbus (IUC) and is now administered through IU Indianapolis. The only two Purdue degree-granting programs at IUPUC were biology and mechanical engineering; the biology degree continues to be offered at IUC through Indiana University, but the engineering degree was discontinued.

== Notable alumni ==
- Norman Bridwell (Herron 1950), author and illustrator of Clifford the Big Red Dog
- Bettie Cadou (English 1957), journalist and photographer
- Julia Carson (Law 1963), former member of the U.S. House of Representatives
- Vija Celmins (Herron 1961), fine art painter and printmaker
- Dan Coats (Law 1971), 5th Director of National Intelligence, former member of the U.S. Senate, U.S. House of Representatives, and U.S. Ambassador to Germany
- George Hill, professional NBA basketball player
- Samuel D. Jackson (Law 1917), a former member of the U.S. Senate
- Mike Pence (Law 1986), 48th Vice President of the United States, 50th Governor of Indiana, and former member of the U.S. House of Representatives.
- Dan Quayle (Law 1974), 44th Vice President of the United States, former member of the U.S. House of Representatives and U.S. Senate
- Arthur Raymond Robinson (Law 1910), former member of the U.S. Senate
- Charles Stanley Ross (JD, 1994), Literary scholar
- Victoria Spartz (Master of Accountancy), member of the U.S. House of Representatives
- Frederick Van Nuys (Law 1900), former member of the U.S. Senate
- Samuel E Vázquez (Herron 2010), abstract expressionist painter
- David Wolf, astronaut

== Chancellors ==
During its lifespan from 1969 until 2024, IUPUI was led by six chancellors. Its sixth and last chancellor was Latha Ramchand, who is also the first chancellor of its successor institution, Indiana University Indianapolis.

== See also ==
- Indiana University–Purdue University Fort Wayne, a defunct co-campus in Indiana's second-largest city
- Indiana University Fort Wayne, one of the successor institutions to IPFW that was administered by IUPUI and now by IU Indianapolis.
