= French (surname) =

French is an anglicised version of Defreine, which has a Norman origin. Although the name is of French origin, it does not mean "French"; rather, it comes from the French word for ash tree.

French is or was the surname of the following individuals (alphabetized by first name):

- Adrienne French (born 1987), fine art photographer
- Alexander French (born 1980), Hong Kong cricketer
- Alice Masak French (1930–2013), Canadian Inuk writer
- Anne French (born 1956), New Zealand poet
- Annie French (1873–1965), Scottish artist
- Anthony French (1920–2017), English professor of physics at Massachusetts Institute of Technology
- Arthur W. French (1846–1916), American journalist and songwriter, and composer
- Barbara French (1926–2022), American politician
- Bob French (jazz musician) (contemporary), American drummer
- Brett French (contemporary), Australian rugby league footballer
- Bruce French (actor) (1945–2025), American actor
- Bruce French (cricketer) (born 1959), English cricketer
- Callie Leach French (1861–1935), American steamboat captain
- Catherine French, American civil engineer
- Charles Jackson French (1919–1956), American sailor
- Charles K. French (1860–1952), American actor
- Charlie French (1883–1962), American baseball player
- Christine French (1968-to present), Mother of Cameron Casner, IT consultant and Sales, former wife of Jason Casner
- Christopher French (theologian), Irish theologian
- Christopher French (judge) (1925–2003), British barrister and judge
- Daniel French (inventor) (1770–1853), American inventor and steamboat pioneer
- Daniel Chester French (1850–1931), American sculptor
- David H. French (anthropologist) (1918–1994), American anthropologist and linguist; expert on Native Americans
- David French (playwright) (1939–2010), Canadian playwright best known for Leaving Home (1971) and other plays about the Mercer family
- Dawn French (born 1957), Welsh-English actress, writer, and comedy performer
- Domingo French (1774–1825), Argentine leader of the May Revolution and War of Independence
- Drew French (born 1984), American baseball coach
- Edward French (bishop), bishop of Elphin from 1787 to 1810
- Elaine French, American politician
- Elizabeth French (contemporary), English archaeologist
- Emma Blood French (1853–1932), American philanthropist
- Emma Lee French (1836–1897), English immigrant to the Southwestern United States who became known as a caregiver
- Freddie French (1911–1989), New Zealand rugby union and professional rugby league footballer
- Frederick Fillmore French (1883–1936), American real estate entrepreneur
- Gary French (contemporary), Australian rugby league footballer
- George Arthur French (1841–1921), Canadian law enforcement officer
- George Hazen French (1841–1935), American naturalist and educator
- George T. French Jr., American academic administrator and university president
- Harriet Schneider French (1824–1906), American physician and temperance movement activist
- Heather French (born 1974), American beauty pageant winner
- Henry F. French (1813–1885), American agriculturist, inventor, lawyer, and public servant
- Hollis French (born 1958), member of the Alaska Senate
- Howard W. French, author, educator, journalist
- Ian French (born 1960), Australian rugby league footballer
- Jackie French (born 29 November 1953), Australian author
- James French (murderer) (1936–1966), American criminal; became sole prisoner executed in 1966
- James Bruce French (1921–2002), Canadian-American nuclear physicists
- James R. French (contemporary), American aerospace engineer
- Jay Jay French (born 1952), American guitarist
- JC French, American football player
- Jennifer French (disambiguation), multiple people
- Jim French (cowboy) (before 1865–after 1879), American frontier figure who became known as an outlaw
- Jim French (photographer) (1932–2017), American artist and photographer of homoerotica who has used the pseudonym Rip Colt
- Jim French (baseball) (born 1941), American catcher active during the 1960s and 1970s
- Jim French (radio) (contemporary), American voice actor and producer
- Joe French (footballer), English footballer with Southampton and New Brompton in the 1890s/1900s
- John French (physician) (1616–1657), English doctor and chemist
- John R. French (1819–1890), American publisher, editor, and political figure
- John French, 1st Earl of Ypres (1852–1925), English military leader, commander of the British Expeditionary Force in World War I
- John French, 2nd Earl of Ypres (1881–1958), English army officer and artist; son of 1st Earl
- John William French (1888–1970), Canadian political figure
- John Alexander French (1914–1942), Australian soldier; posthumous recipient of Victoria Cross for valor in World War II
- John French (racing driver) (1930–2025), Australian champion racer of the 1960s, 1970s, and early 1980s
- Joe French (born 1948), British air chief marshal, Royal Air Force commander
- John French (musician) (born 1949), American drummer
- John French (ice hockey) (born 1950), Canadian ice hockey player
- Joseph Lewis French (1858–1936), American novelist, editor, and poet
- Joseph Nathaniel French (1888–1975), architect
- Kate French (born 1984), American actress
- Katy French (1983–2007), Irish socialite and model
- Kenneth French (born 1954), American economist
- Kristen French (1976–1992), Canadian murder victim
- Lisa Ann French (1964–1973), American murder victim
- Lloyd French (1900–1950), American film director
- Lorna French, British playwright
- Lucy Virginia French (1825–1881; pen name, "L'Inconnue"), American author
- Marilyn French (1929–2009), American author
- Mary Billings French, American heiress
- Melinda Ann French (born 1964), American philanthropist ex-wife of Bill Gates; best known as Melinda Gates
- Michael French (born 1962), English actor best known for his television roles as David Wicks on EastEnders and Nick Jordan on Casualty and Holby City
- Micky French (born 1955), English footballer
- Nicki French (born 1964), English singer
- Patrick French (bishop), bishop of Elphin from 1731 to 1748
- Pete French, singer in the hard rock bands Leaf Hound, Atomic Rooster and Cactus
- Percy French (1854–1920), Irish songwriter, performer, and painter
- Peter French (1849–1897), cattle baron in Oregon
- Peter French (Dominican) (died 1693), Irish theologian
- Ray French (baseball) (1895–1978), American major league shortstop of the 1920s; later minor league manager and umpire
- Ray H. French (1919–2000), American artist and printmaker
- Ray French (1939–2025), English rugby radio commentator and player
- Robert French (born 1947), Chief Justice of the High Court of Australia
- Roger Kenneth French (1938–2002), English medical historian
- Rufus French (born 1978), American football player
- Sally French (born 1970), Canadian-born American Episcopal bishop
- Samuel French (1821–1898), American entrepreneur and theatrical publisher
- Samuel Gibbs French (1818–1910), American Army officer who served as Confederate major general during Civil War
- Sarah French, American beauty contest winner who subsequently became a television news reporter
- Seán French (1890–1937), Irish Fianna Fáil political figure who served in Dáil and as Lord Mayor of Cork (1924–29 and 1932–37)
- Seán French (1931–2011), Irish Fianna Fáil political figure who served in Dáil and as Lord Mayor of Cork (1976–77)
- Sid French (1920–1979), British communist
- Susan French (1912–2003), American television, film, and stage actress
- Tana French (born 1973), Irish novelist and theatrical actress
- Valerie French (actress) (1928–1990), English-American performer who played leads in six 1956–57 films
- Valerie French (born 1962), American wrestling personality best known under the ring name, Sunshine (wrestling)
- Victor French (1934–1989), American actor best known for playing in support of Michael Landon on the television series Highway to Heaven
- Walter French (baseball) (1899–1984), American outfielder for Philadelphia Athletics who played in 1929 World Series
- Walter French (cricket umpire) (before 1905–1961), Australian cricket figure who umpired 1931 Test matches
- Warren French (born 1963), New Zealand darts player
- Wesley French (born 1996), American football player
- William H. French (1815–1881), American Union Army general in Civil War

== See also ==
- Andy & Kevin French, the main characters on The WB's animated sitcom Mission Hill .
- Joseph French, a detective who appears in several novels by Irish-English author Freeman Wills Crofts (1879–1957)
- Giles French, English butler "Mr. French", portrayed by actor Sebastian Cabot on the 1966–71 television series of America, Family Affair
- Paul French, a pseudonym used by American author Isaac Asimov (1920–1992) for his juvenile book series Lucky Starr
- Nicci French, pseudonym of a married duo of British journalists and authors, Nicci Gerrard, and Sean French
- Jim French (horse) (1968–1992), American thoroughbred racehorse
- Ffrench or ffrench, variant spellings of the surname
- Baron de Freyne (1786–)
