= Ffrench =

Ffrench or ffrench is a relatively rare surname found in Ireland, a variant of the name French.

The name originated in France and was brought by the Normans, who landed in Bannow Bay, County Wexford, Ireland in 1169. According to Surname DB the original name is of Early Medieval English and Norman origin. It is a topographical name for someone who lived near an ash tree or ash wood, being derived from the Old French "fraisne, fresne", ash tree.

== Variations ==
In some rarer cases, the name does not start with an initial capital, but with a lower-case f; see Word-initial ff.

== Notable people ==
Part of the family branch is considered to be one of the "Tribes of Galway", having been there since the 13th century.

Notable people named Ffrench or ffrench include:

- Alexis Ffrench (born 1970), British pianist and composer
- Alfred Kirke Ffrench (1835–1872), British soldier, recipient of the Victoria Cross
- Baron ffrench, a title in the peerage of Ireland:
  - Rose ffrench, 1st Baroness ffrench (d. 1805)
- Charles ffrench-Constant (born 1954), neurology researcher
- Conrad O'Brien-ffrench (1893–1986), British Secret Intelligence officer
- Di ffrench (1946–1999), New Zealand photographic and performance artist and sculptor
- Edmund Ffrench (1775–1852), Irish clergyman
- Gonville ffrench-Beytagh (1913–1991), Anglican priest
- Isamaya Ffrench (born 1989), British make-up artist
- Jaime Ffrench Jr. (born 2006), American football player
- John Ffrench (1928-2010), Irish ceramicist
- Leonardo Ffrench, Mexican diplomat
- Madeleine ffrench-Mullen (1880–1944), Irish revolutionary and labour activist
- Maurice Ffrench (born 1998), American football player
- Michael ffrench-O'Carroll (1919–2007), Irish doctor and politician
- Mostyn Ffrench-Williams (1914–1963), British swimmer
- Peter Ffrench (1844–1929), Irish politician
- Ricardo Ffrench-Davis (born 1936), Chilean economist
- Richard ffrench-Constant, professor of molecular natural history
- Robert Ffrench (born c. 1962), Jamaican reggae singer and record producer
- Royston Ffrench (born 1975), British jockey
- Val ffrench Blake (1913–2011), English army officer, animal breeder, and author

== See also ==
- Cecil Ffrench Salkeld, Irish painter, printmaker, critic and writer
- Edward Thomas ffrench Bromhead, British landowner and mathematician
- Jackie French, born Ffrench, Australian author
- Peter Ffrench Loughlin, Australian politician
