= IU Science and Engineering Laboratory Building =

Science and Engineering Laboratory Building
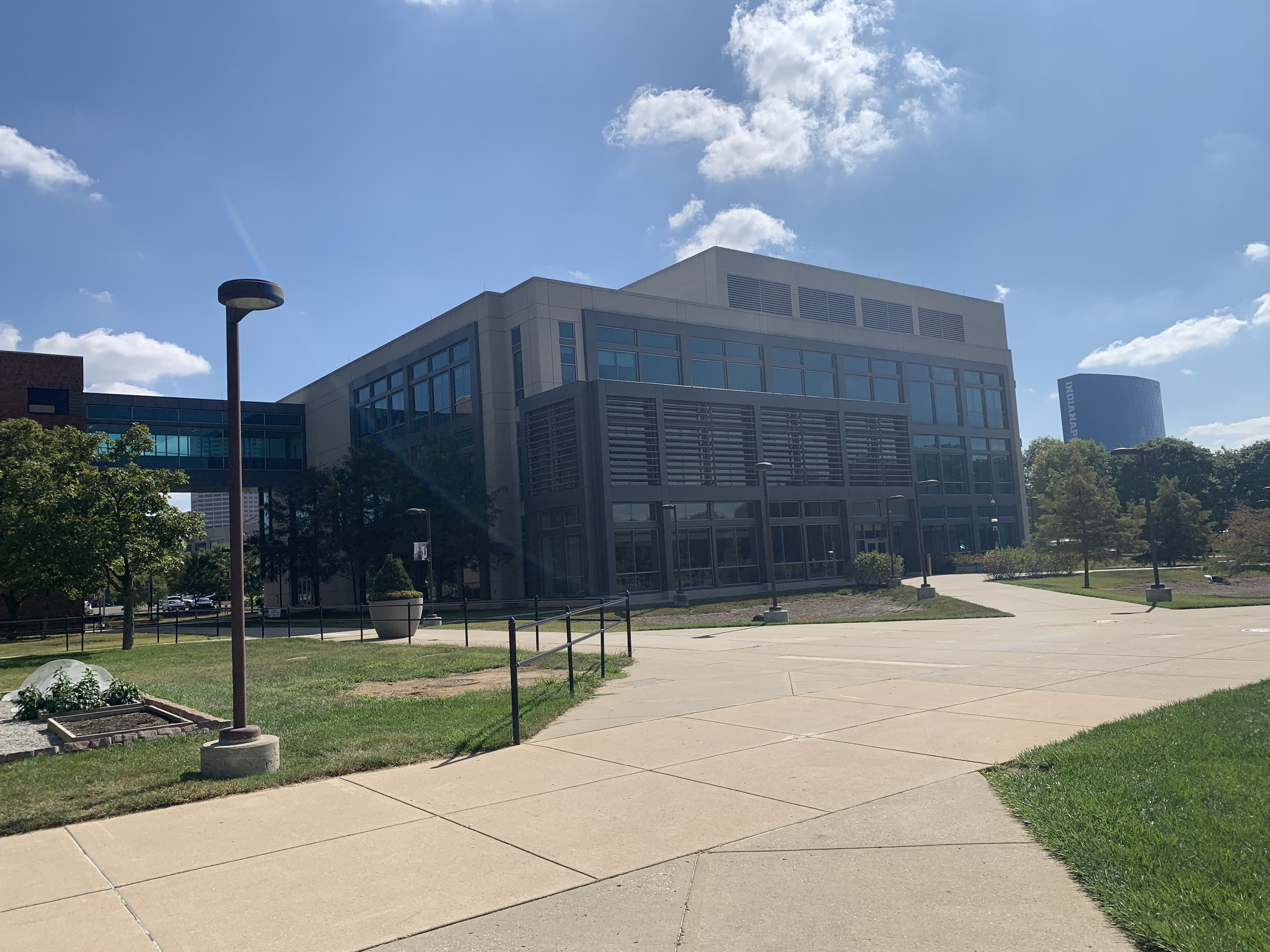
- Indiana University Indianapolis Science and Engineering Laboratory Building, 2023.

General information
- Location: 350 N. Blackford St., Indianapolis, IN 46202-3115
- Coordinates: 39°46′20.841″N 86°10′14.088″W
- Completed: 2013
- Affiliation: Indiana University-Purdue University Indianapolis

Design and construction
- Architects: Blackburn Architects and BSA LifeStructures

== History ==
The Science and Engineering Laboratory Building was constructed in 2013 and designed by Blackburn Architects and BSA LifeStructures. The building cost a total of $25 million. The building was the first nonmedical academic building to be built on the IUPUI campus in 20 years. The dedication ceremony for the new science facility was held on November 19, 2013. The building is a multidisciplinary laboratory building consisting of various laboratories and a vivarium. The building is located east of the University Library and north of Sidney and Lois Eskenazi Hall.

== Cyberlab ==
The CyberLab, previously known as WebLab, opened in 1996 under the leadership of Ali Jafari and David Mills. Jafari was a faculty member at the School of Engineering and Technology who developed a program known as Oncourse. Oncourse was an online teaching and learning environment created for students and faculty at IUPUI. The success of Oncourse led to the creation of the IUPUI CyberLab, where Jafari and Mills created a new course management system known as ANGEL (A New Global Environment for Learning). ANGEL was free for schools to use, and some early adopters included the State University of New York and Penn State University.

In 1998, IUPUI began offering all their classes online due to the programs developed by CyberLab. Some off their earlier projects included Sakai and Epsilen. Their current project is called CourseNetworking. In 2013, the CyberLab moved to their new location in the Science and Engineering Laboratory Building.

== Welcome to the Neighborhood Exhibit ==
In 2018, an exhibit titled “Welcome to the Neighborhood! Recognizing those who were here before” was displayed in the southwest corner of the first floor. This exhibition, which tells the stories of people, businesses, churches, homes, and community life that once existed in Indianapolis’s near-west side neighborhood prior to university expansion, is part of the IUPUI Welcoming Campus Initiative. The exhibition was developed by Museum Studies and Anthropology students at IUPUI.

== See also ==
- Indiana University–Purdue University Indianapolis Public Art Collection
- Taking Delight in Interviewing the Neighborhood
