= Baron ffrench =

Arms of ffrench

Baron ffrench, of Castle ffrench in the County of Galway, is a title in the Peerage of Ireland created on 14 February 1798 for Rose, Lady ffrench. She was the widow of Charles ffrench, who had been created a Baronet, of Clogha in County Galway, in the Baronetage of Ireland on 17 August 1779. Their son Thomas succeeded in both the baronetcy and barony. Both titles have descended via primogeniture to the present Baron.

The title and the family name are both spelled with a lower-case double-'f'.

== ffrench baronets, of Castle ffrench (1779) ==
- Sir Charles ffrench, 1st Baronet (died 1784)
- Sir Thomas ffrench, 2nd Baronet (c. 1765–1814) (succeeded as Baron ffrench in 1805)

== Barons ffrench (1798) ==
- Rose ffrench, 1st Baroness ffrench (died 1805)
- Thomas ffrench, 2nd Baron ffrench (c. 1765–1814)
- Charles Austin ffrench, 3rd Baron ffrench (1786–1860)
- Thomas ffrench, 4th Baron ffrench (1810–1892)
- Martin Joseph ffrench, 5th Baron ffrench (1813–1893)
- Charles Austin Thomas Robert John Joseph ffrench, 6th Baron ffrench (1868–1955)
- Peter Martin Joseph Charles John ffrench, 7th Baron ffrench (1926–1986)
- Robuck John Peter Charles Mario ffrench, 8th Baron ffrench (born 1956)

There is no heir to the title.
