= Monivea =

Village in County Galway, Ireland

Monivea Muine Mheá (Irish)
- Village
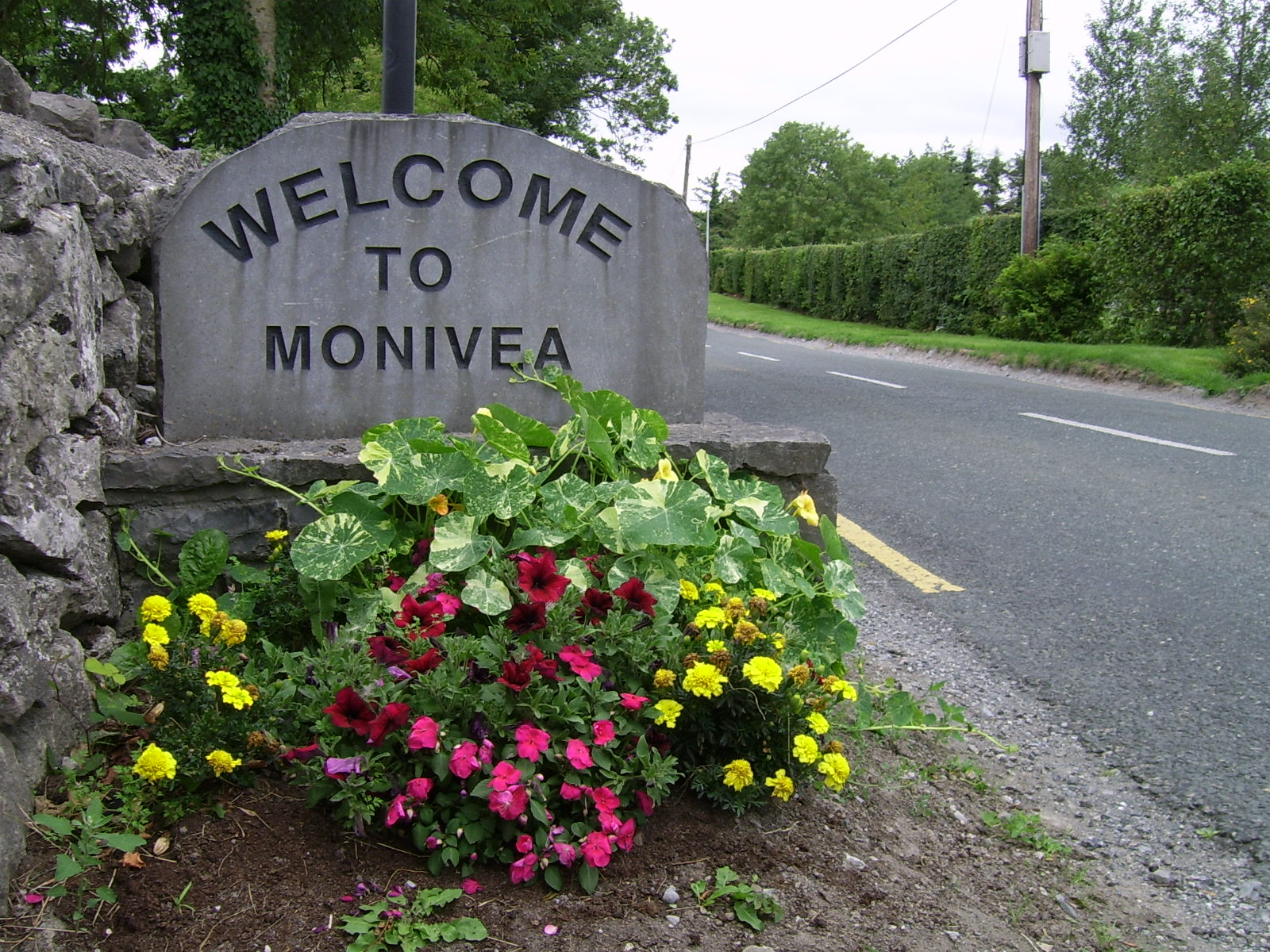
- "Welcome" signage

- Location in Ireland
- Coordinates: 53°22′28″N 8°42′15″W
- Country: Ireland
- Province: Connacht
- County: County Galway
- Elevation: 83 m (272 ft)

Population (2022)
  - Total: 456
- Time zone: UTC+0 (WET)
  - Summer (DST): UTC-1 (IST (WEST))
- Irish Grid Reference: M535354

Monivea (Irish: Muine Mheá) is a village in County Galway, Ireland. It is located approximately 30 km (19 mi) from Galway City and 9 km (6 mi) from Athenry. The village is in a civil parish of the same name.

It was formerly part of the kingdom of the Soghain of Connacht. Monivea is known for its forest, Monivea Castle which now lies in partial ruins, and a well-preserved mausoleum. The mausoleum and castle were built by the Ffrench family, one of the "Tribes of Galway", who were also responsible for the distinctive layout of the greens in the centre of the village, which were used as drying stations for the linen (known as flax) of local industries. The forest, mausoleum and castle were left to the State by the last Ffrench, and the forest is now held by Coillte.

There are two small grocery shops one with a petrol station, a butcher shop, four pubs, a Garda station, a post office, a playground, a church in Ryehill, and Monivea National School.

== History ==
In 1609, members of the ffrench (or Ffrench) family, who had been landholders in Galway since the early Norman era, and were one of the Norman-Gaelic tribes of Galway, bought land from the O'Kelly family. Building on to a fortified residence ("castle") built by the O'Kellys, the Ffrenches established Monivea House, which is commonly known as Monivea Castle.

During the Reformation, the Ffrenches remained Catholic. As a result, in 1650 the Commonwealth of England confiscated their properties. Following the Restoration, however, these lands were returned to the Ffrenches.

Subsequent generations of the Ffrenches reclaimed land that had previously been bogs. In 1744, Robert Ffrench inherited the property. He made bogland arable by liming, ploughing and seeding it. He set up a linen industry and houses for the weavers. Greens were laid out to dry the linen. He built a school and planted trees where Monivea Woods now stands.

In 1762, construction commenced on a Protestant (Anglican) Church, which was consecrated by the Archbishop of Tuam. It remained in use until 1924, after which the building deteriorated. The south side of the roof collapsed in 1955, although most of the building remains, alongside the playground in the village.

== Landmarks ==
The Father Sammon Centre is used to host events, including those marking the twinning with Treméven and celebrating the 1916 Rising. The hall is also used by several clubs in including boxing, active age, taekwondo and dance clubs.

The mausoleum contains the remains of Robert Ffrench and his daughter. A nearby icehouse was used for food storage by the Ffrenches.

== Sport ==
Monivea Abbey and Abbeyknockmoy Hurling are the local Gaelic Athletic Association clubs.

Monivea Rugby Club has been present in the village since 1977. There are also taekwondo, kickboxing and boxing clubs.

== Twinning ==
The village of Monivea had been officially twinned with the town of Treméven, France in 2010. However this process begun long before this with a number of visits between the two towns in the preceding years. The first part of the twinning towns charter was signed on 5 July 2009 in the town of Treméven, France. The Monivea representatives spent a week being entertained by music, dance, tours of the area, and banquets provided by their hosts in Trémeven. Monivea signed the second part of the Twinning towns charter on Sunday 15 August 2010 in Monivea with the town of Treméven France.
