= Christopher French =

Christopher French could refer to:

- Christopher French (theologian) (fl. c. 1650–c.1713), Irish professor of divinity
- Chris French (Christopher Charles French) (born 1956), British psychologist
- Christopher French (judge) (1925–2003), British jurist
- Christopher French (admiral), American naval officer

== See also ==
- Christine French, New Zealand jurist
- Christopher France (disambiguation)
