= Coalition of Urban and Metropolitan Universities =

International organization of universities

Coalition of Urban and Metropolitan Universities (CUMU)
- Abbreviation: CUMU
- Formation: 1989
- Type: non-governmental organization
- Headquarters: Towson, Maryland
- Members: 115+ colleges and universities and their partners worldwide
- Executive Director: Ellen Neufeldt
- Website: cumuonline.org

The Coalition of Urban and Metropolitan Universities (CUMU) is an international membership organization of colleges and universities located in urban and metropolitan areas that share common understandings of their institutional missions and values. CUMU was founded in 1989 by 10 university presidents gathered at Wright State University who realized their unique challenges and opportunities as they looked to the future of higher education.

CUMU is headquartered at Towson University in Towson, Maryland.

The organization publishes Metropolitan Universities journal, a scholarly publication addressing the issues facing urban and metropolitan-serving institutions, such as civic engagement, leadership, and shared academic spaces. As of 2016, the journal has been published entirely online as an open-access journal.

== History ==
The Coalition of Urban and Metropolitan Universities (CUMU) was founded in 1989 by a group of presidents and chancellors who gathered at Wright State University. Member institutions pledged to enrich their communities while strengthening the campus’ core commitment to teaching and research.

The first meeting of university leadership to define the “metropolitan university” was held at Wright State University. In 1990, 50 institutions signed the original Declaration of Metropolitan Universities, formalizing CUMU as an organization. In 1996, the first formal bylaws were written and approved.

== Headquarters ==
Wright State University served as the first CUMU headquarters. During this time period the organization held conferences and published Metropolitan Universities journal, but did not formally collect membership dues. In 1994, CUMU headquarters moved to the University of North Texas. In 2002, CUMU headquarters moved to Eastern Michigan University and CUMU was incorporated in the state of Michigan. In 2006, following a competitive bidding process, Towson University was named as the CUMU administrative home.

== Leadership and governance ==
CUMU is governed by a board of directors, composed of presidents and chancellors of member institutions, and led by an executive director. Board members are elected to two-year terms during the annual presidents' meeting at the CUMU annual conference in October. The current CUMU chair is Kristin Sobelik, Chancellor of University of Missouri–St. Louis.

Valerie Holton, Ph.D., LCSW, was named executive director in June 2022.

== Metropolitan Universities journal ==
Since 1990, the organization has published Metropolitan Universities journal, a scholarly publication addressing the issues facing urban and metropolitan-serving institutions. As of 2016, the journal has been published entirely online as an open-access publication. The journal is hosted and supported by the IUPUI University Library. The journal's editors have included:

- Ernest A. Lynton (1990–1997)
- Barbara A. Holland (1997–2016)
- Valerie Holton (2016–2023)
- Patrick M. Green (2023–present)

== Membership ==
=== United States ===
- University of Arkansas at Little Rock
- Arizona State University
- Campuses of the California State University (Dominguez Hills, Fullerton, Los Angeles, California State University, Northridge, San Bernardino, and San Marcos)
- Metropolitan State University of Denver, University of Colorado Denver, University of Colorado Colorado Springs, University of Denver
- American University, Georgetown University, George Washington University, University of the District of Columbia
- Florida Atlantic University, Florida International University, Miami Dade College, University of North Florida
- Georgia Tech, Clayton State University,
- University of Chicago, Northeastern Illinois University, Southern Illinois University Edwardsville, DePaul University
- Indiana University Northwest, Indiana University Indianapolis, Purdue University Fort Wayne, University of Southern Indiana
- University of Louisville
- Louisiana State University Shreveport
- University of Southern Maine
- Johns Hopkins University, University System of Maryland, Coppin State University, Morgan State University, Towson University, University of Baltimore
- University of Massachusetts Boston, University of Massachusetts Lowell, Worcester State University
- Oakland University, University of Michigan-Dearborn, University of Michigan-Flint, Wayne State University
- Augsburg University, Metropolitan State University, University of Minnesota
- Jackson State University
- Washington University in St. Louis, Saint Louis University, University of Missouri-Kansas City, University of Missouri-St. Louis – University of Missouri Extension, Missouri State University
- University of Nebraska at Omaha
- University of Nevada, Las Vegas
- Rutgers University–New Brunswick, Rutgers University–Camden, Rutgers University–Newark, Fairleigh Dickinson University
- New York University, Barnard College, Syracuse University, Rochester Institute of Technology, Buffalo State University, College of Staten Island, Manhattanville University, Medgar Evers College, The New School, Pace University, Wagner College, Hunter College
- University of North Carolina at Charlotte, University of North Carolina at Greensboro, UNC Wilmington, Guilford College
- Ohio State University, Case Western Reserve University, Cleveland State University, Wright State University
- University of Central Oklahoma
- Portland State University
- University of Pennsylvania, University of Pittsburgh, Drexel University, Temple University, Duquesne University, Gannon University, Widener University, West Chester University, Cabrini University, Community College of Philadelphia
- Brown University
- University of South Carolina Upstate
- University of Tennessee at Chattanooga
- University of Houston–Downtown, University of North Texas at Dallas, Texas State University, Baylor University
- University of Utah, Weber State University
- Old Dominion University, Virginia Commonwealth University, Virginia Wesleyan University
- Washington State University Tri-Cities, Washington State University Vancouver
- Marquette University, University of Wisconsin–Green Bay, University of Wisconsin–Milwaukee

=== Canada ===
- MacEwan University
- York University

== See also ==
- Coalition of Urban Serving Universities
