= Georgiabelle Clark =

American painter and printmaker (1907–1976)

- Born: February 14, 1907; Indianapolis, Indiana
- Died: December 12, 1976 (aged 69); Cincinnati, Ohio
- Resting place: Spring Grove Cemetery
- Education: Herron Art Institute
- Known for: Painting, Printmaking

Georgiabelle Clark (née Fleener; February 14, 1907 – December 12, 1976) was an American painter and printmaker active in her home state of Indiana and in Ohio. Her career spanned over fifty years.

== Life and career ==
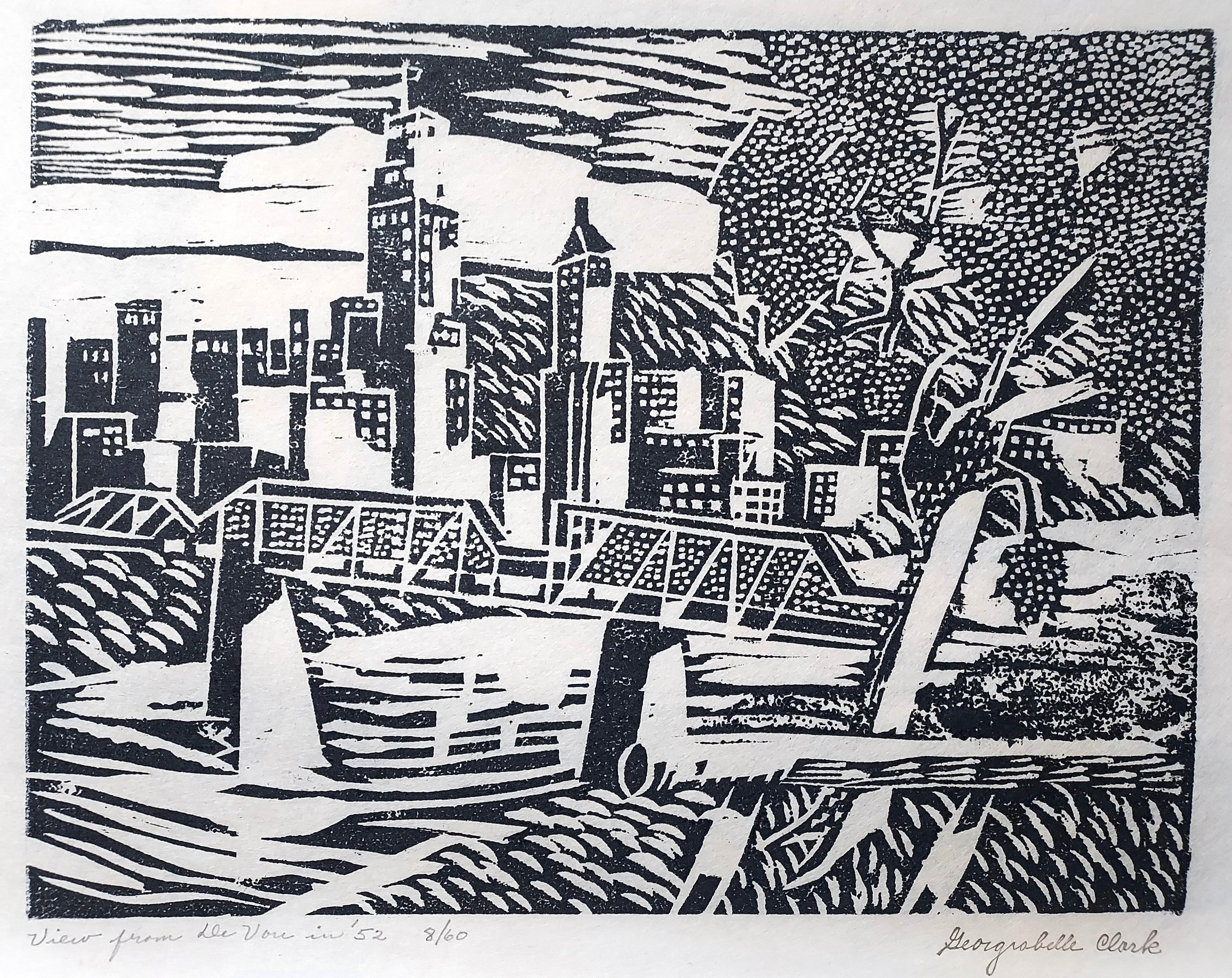
View from Devou Park, 1952, woodblock on paper

Georgiabelle Fleener was born on February 14, 1907, in Indianapolis, the third child of physician Otto Florea Fleener (1878–1942) and housewife Lulu Belle Overman (1876–1962). She completed her studies at the Herron School of Art and Design, known then as the John Herron Art Institute. After marrying Ohio native Lawrence R. Clark (1905–1988) and relocating to Cincinnati, she also trained with painter Emma Mendenhall.

Between 1954 and 1956, Clark served as president of the Woman's Art Club of Cincinnati. She continued producing paintings and prints until at least the mid-1960s and many of her works were included in the annual Hoosier Art Salon, in her home state of Indiana. Clark died on December 12, 1976. A Cincinnati gallery held a retrospective exhibition of her paintings in 1987.
