= Wilbert L. Holloway =

US cartoonist

Wilbert L. Holloway (1899 - 1969) was a cartoonist in the United States. He drew the Sunny Boy Sam cartoon for 41 years. It was the second longest running comic strip in the African American press. The cartoon ran in the Pittsburgh Courier and was continued after Holloway's death by another cartoonist. Holloway also did political cartoons. A file on him is held by Ohio State University.

Holloway attended Herron Art School and shared an artist studio with Hale Woodruff before moving to Pittsburgh.

The Sunny Boy Sam trip was comedic. It featured gags and a lead character who played the numbers and appeared with minstrel features and heavy dialect.

In April 1927, Holloway illustrated Langston Hughes' story "Bodies in the Moonlight" in The Messenger.

== See also ==
- Sam Milai
