= Monivea Castle =

Tower house in County Galway, Ireland

- Monivea, County Galway, Ireland
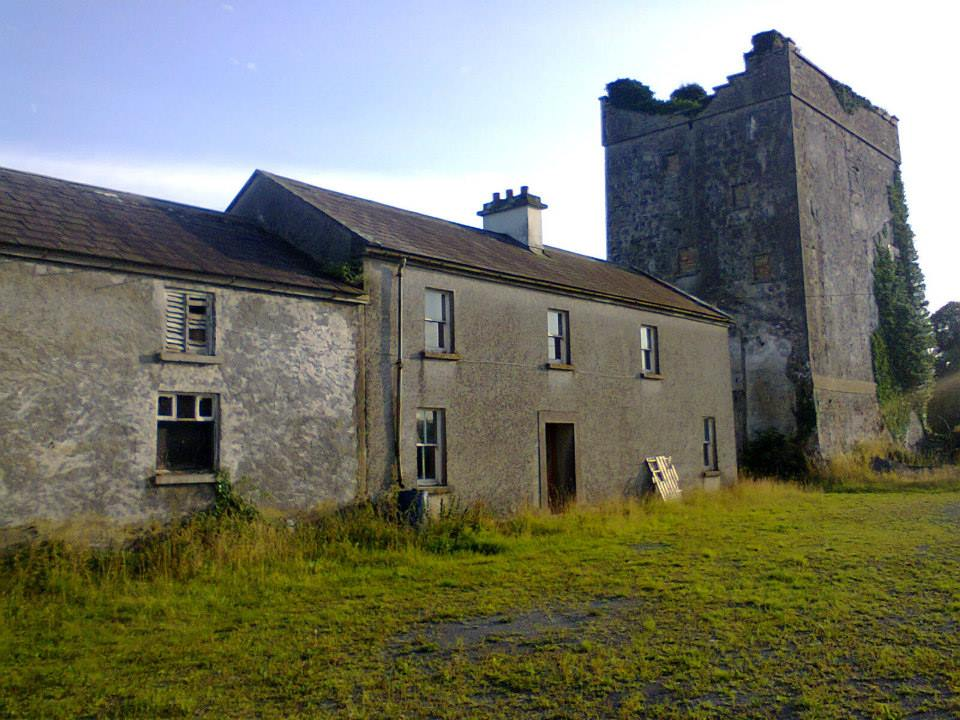
- Monivea Castle with the original Anglo-Norman tower house to the right. The later mansion was built up against its north, west and south walls

Site information
- Type: Tower house
- Open to the public: Yes

Location
- Coordinates: 53.376314°N 8.678259°W

Site history
- Materials: Stone
- Events: Commemorative Mass in Mausoleum, 22 April, annually (anniversary of Robert Percy's death)

Monivea Castle (Irish: Caisleán Mhuine Mheá) is a former O'Kelly tower house, located near Monivea in County Galway, Ireland. It was acquired by the ffrench family, one of the fourteen Tribes of Galway, who developed it further, enhancing the lands and building the Monivea Castle—all increasing the fortification around the original Norman tower.

In 1876, the Monivea Castle estate took in 10,121 acres of land, including the features of the tower house ruins, Monivea Castle itself, the ffrench Mausoleum and Monivea Woods. The demesne lands surrounding Monivea Castle were worked directly for the benefit of the landlord. Further outlying lands were rented out for farming. Estate farmers and domestic servants lived in the surrounding region, the town of Monivea taking shape from this initial population, homes and servicing merchant posts.

== Features ==
=== Monivea Castle ===
Monivea Castle resides in the midst of extensive woodlands, encompassed by a stone fence and five rows of enormous beech trees. Monivea Castle has two gate-lodges, one to the right of the main gate entry, where staff screened or welcomed visitors.

=== ffrench Mausoleum ===
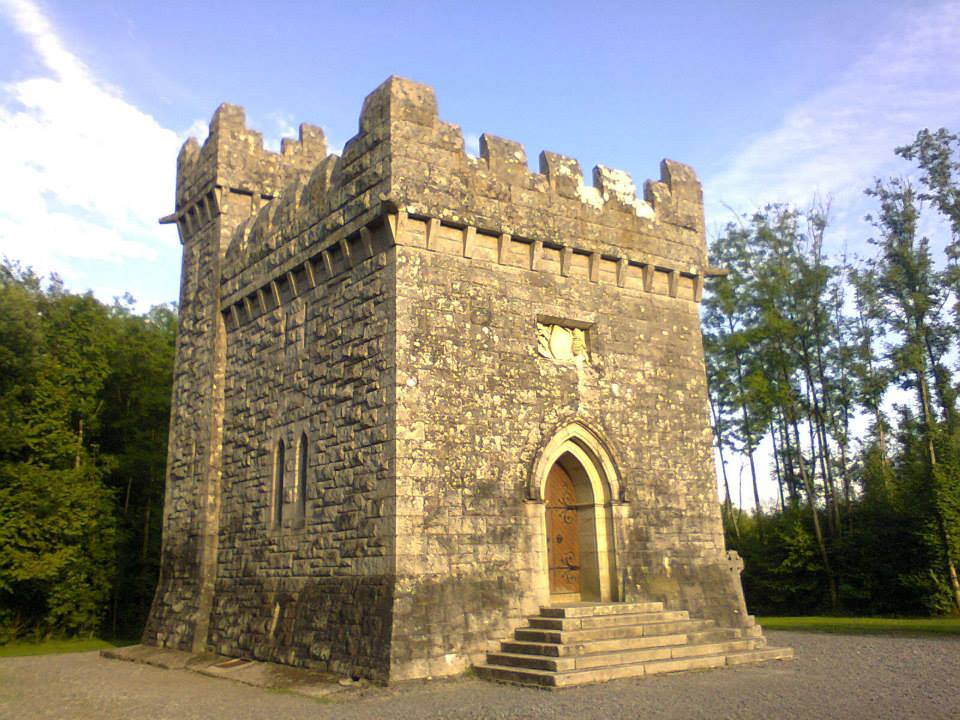
The ffrench Mausoleum, Monivea

Set in a clearing amidst the trees of Monivea Wood, the ffrench Mausoleum and chapel was commissioned by Kathleen ffrench in honour of her late father, Robert Percy ffrench. In 1914, the Pope granted an indult, permitting official mass celebrations on special occasions and under special circumstances. Designed by architect Francis Persse (younger brother of Augusta Gregory), the mausoleum took four years to construct, at a cost of £10,000 (near two million in today's economy). Built of rough-granite blocks quarried in Wicklow, the structure resembles a small castle, approximately 25-feet-wide by 30-feet-high, with crenellation along the roofline, and featuring a back, left turret. Stone steps lead up to a gothic-archway and heavy oak door secured with decorative rod iron hinges.

Entering into the ffrench Mausoleum, strategically placed stained glass windows provide the only source of light and create a serene atmosphere. The building has no electricity. A central window, depicting the Resurrection, is set into the stone wall, behind the black and white marble altar bearing a carved Maltese cross. The east-facing triple-lancet stained-glass window is positioned so the rising sun lights upon the memorial sculpture. On each side wall, Munich-style stained glass windows illustrate twelve of the fourteen Tribes of Galway. All of the intricately designed windows were created by Franz Mayer & Co.—a famous German stained glass design and manufacturing company based in Munich. Mayer of Munich, still in business today, was the principal creator of stained glass for Roman Catholic churches constructed during the nineteenth and early twentieth century, including St. Peter's Basilica in Rome.

Paired granite pillars guard the entrance to the barrel-vaulted chancel, four black marble pillars provide structural support. The mausoleum's high-vaulted ceiling and granite gothic arches shelter a life-size carrara marble effigy of Robert Percy ffrench lying in state. Francesco Jerace, a Calabrian sculptor, created a true likeness of Robert ffrench, lying on his back, feet to door, covered by white, rhythmically draped carved marble with an inscribed Maltese cross. On the side of ffrench's effigy is carved: "Il lui sera beaucoup pardonne car il a beaucoup aime". He will be forgiven much because he has loved much.

=== Monivea Woods ===
Situated 17 miles east of Galway city, north of Athenry, the estate of Monivea, once mainly bogland, has been reclaimed as useful land through the careful handling by successive generations of the ffrench family. Lime and sheep carcasses integrated into the soil provide nutrients to plants and trees, encouraging growth and subsequently stabilising the soil. Robert Percy ffrench continued to develop the estate by acquiring more land, and planting an extensive parkland surrounded by five rows of large beech trees. Monivea Woods provided a forest home for wildlife, including fox, hare, squirrel and migratory birds. It was the site for regular hunts with the local Galway Blazers. Kathleen, who inherited Monivea Castle from her father Robert ffrench, enjoyed the excitement of these events, as well as walks and recreation in the peaceful woodlands.

Under the stewardship of the ffrench family, the property continued to flourish, and today, Monivea Woods is known for its unique flora and archaeology. The broadleaf forest offers a natural habitat for Irish wild fungi, lichens, bryophytes and native plants. The trees provide nesting sites and song posts for birds, encouraging the habitat of larger species of birds such as Wood Pigeons, Sparrowhawks and Jays. Lower shrubs provide shelter for small mammals. Seed-bearing plants and forest insects supply an easy food source. Monivea Woods is regarded now as being one of the most environmentally diverse and vulnerable parts of East County Galway.

According to a 2002 report funded by Ireland's Department of Environment and Local Government, "Only 9% of Ireland has any forest cover at all today and less than 1% of the surface of the island contains forest established before 1600." Monivea Woods is not only an ecological achievement but a resource for continued development of Ireland's biodiversity.

== Controversy ==
Upon the death of Kathleen ffrench in 1938, with no heir apparent, she bequeathed Monivea Castle, including the estate to the Irish Nation. Kathleen's Will states:

"I give devise and bequeath to the Irish Nation the demesne of Monivea with the Castle including Kilbeg and Currendoo, the bogs, reclaimed lands and plantations, on condition that no parcel of these remains of my former estate shall ever be sold or the old trees cut down unless they fall to pieces."
