= Christopher France =

Christopher France may refer to:

- Thrust (rapper) (born 1976), Canadian musician
- Christopher France (civil servant) (1934–2014), English civil servant

== See also ==
- Christopher French (disambiguation)
