= Rob Day =

American illustrator

- Education: Herron School of Art
- Website: robday.com

Rob Day is an American illustrator.

== Life and work ==
As a child, he practiced drawing on plain paper with pencils. As a child, his favorite book was Gilkerson on War. Day graduated from Herron School of Art. He was not interested in the painting techniques being taught there, so he studied graphic design and typography.

== Work ==
To create his illustrations, Day reads the manuscript he is provided. Then, he starts to draw on a blank sheet of paper. He uses "historic and contemporary imagery," to influence his work.

His illustrations have been featured in the New York Times and Rolling Stone. His first major contract was with Sports Illustrated. He got his first gig by sending out cards to potential publishers in books he found at his local library. He has since created portraits of the Rolling Stones, Frank Sinatra and John Mayer. Norman Rockwell is an influence o his work. He has illustrated works by Lesley Howarth.
