= Carol Ann Carter =

American artist

- Born: 1947 (age 78–79); Indianapolis, Indiana
- Education: Herron School of Art and Design, BFA, 1970; University of Notre Dame, MFA, 1974
- Known for: Intaglio printmaking textile art
- Awards: National Endowment Individual Artists Award

Carol Ann Carter is an American artist best known for her mixed media and fiber construction works. Her works can be found in public collections such as the Indianapolis Museum of Art. She is a Professor Emeritus of visual arts at the University of Kansas.

== Background ==
Carol Ann Carter was born in Indianapolis in 1947.

She earned her Bachelor of Fine Arts from the Herron School of Art at the Indiana University in 1970. After completing her Bachelor's she was taken on as artist-in-residence at her alma mater, Shortridge High School in Indianapolis. The program was funded by the PTA Fine Arts Committee and the Indiana State Arts Commission and was meant to inspire artistic expression and confidence in students who were not already interested in the arts. Carter then completed her Masters of Fine Arts from the University of Notre Dame in 1974. While at Notre Dame, Carter studied with Moira Geoffrion and participated in a local chapter of the Indiana Women's Caucus for Art established by Geoffrion.

== Art influence and style ==
In her early years, Carter was focused on intaglio printmaking and then transitioned into textile work in 1984 after she traveled to Nigeria on a Lilly Endowment to study traditional men's embroidery and weaving. This trip solidified her interest in examining culture and gender through textile work. Carter's recent works are multimedia, digital and video based.

Carter received the 2022-2023 Creative Renewal Arts Fellowship from the IndyArts Council.

== Personal life ==
While teaching at the University of Kansas, Carter lived in Lawrence.

== Selected awards ==
- National Endowment Individual Artists Award
- Lilly Foundation Open Faculty Fellowship for Sabbatical research
- Ford Foundation Postdoctoral for Minorities Fellowship
- J.W. Fulbright Fellowship for research
- Kansas Arts Commission Individual Artist Fellowship

== Exhibitions ==
- 1995: University of Kansas, Art and Design Gallery Lawrence, KS
- 1994: Indianapolis Museum of Art Indianapolis, IN
- 1993: University of Rhode Island Kingston, RI
- 1993: G.R. N'Namdi Gallery Columbus, OH
- 1992: Cinque Gallery New York, NY
