= Sidney and Lois Eskenazi Hall =

Academic hall in Indianapolis, Indiana, U.S.

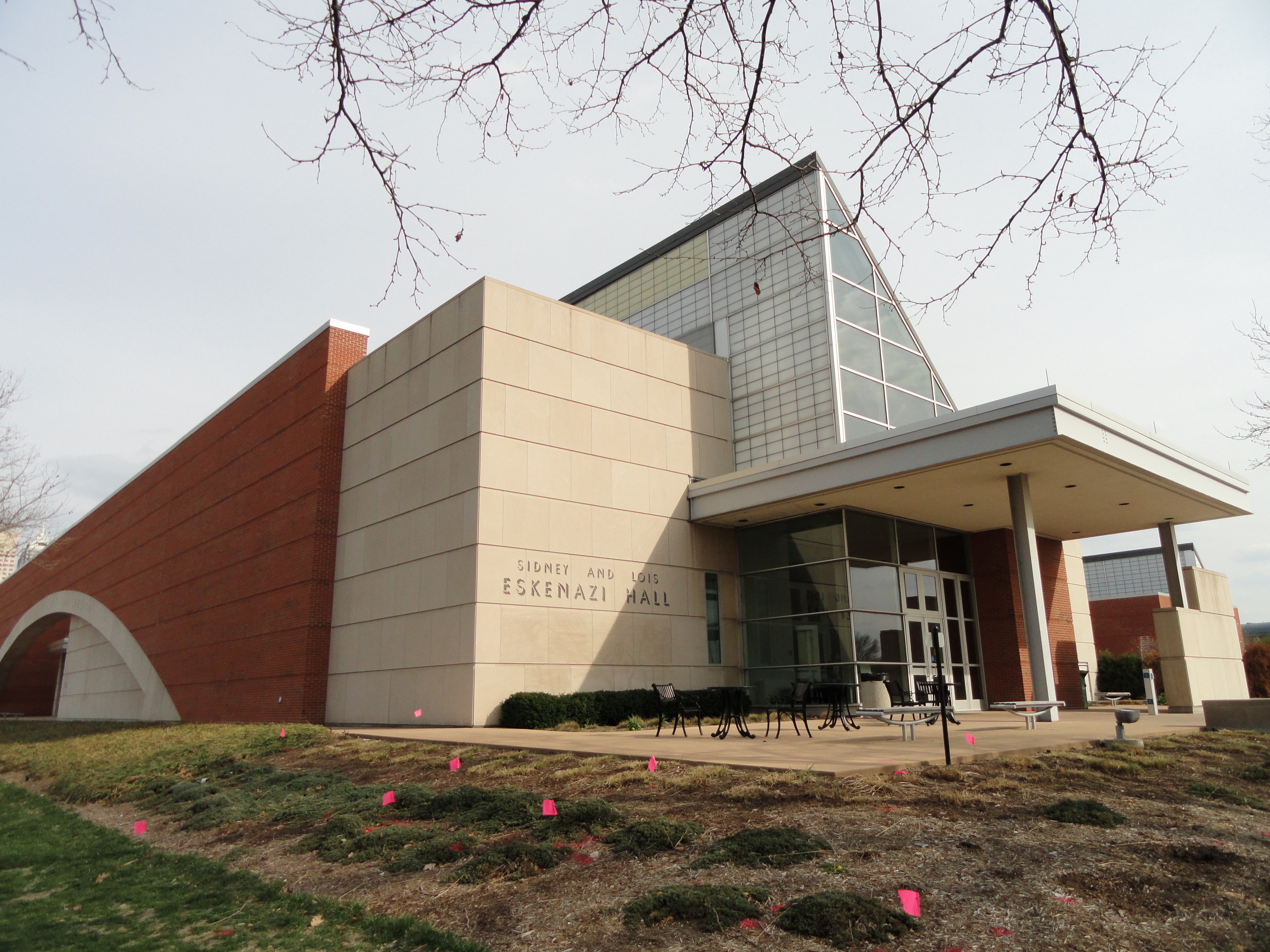
- Sidney and Lois Eskenazi Hall in 2011
- Former names: Indiana University Law School Building
- Alternative names: Eskenazi Hall

General information
- Location: 735 W. New York St., Indianapolis, IN 46202
- Coordinates: 39°46′15.610″N 86°10′16.77″W
- Named for: Sidney and Lois Eskenazi
- Completed: 1970
- Renovated: 2001-2005
- Affiliation: Indiana University-Purdue University Indianapolis

Sidney & Lois Eskenazi Hall is home to the Indiana University Herron School of Art and is located on the south side of the Indiana University Indianapolis campus in Indianapolis, Indiana, United States. To its north lies the Wood Plaza and University Library, to the east is Military Park, and to its West is the Indiana University Natatorium. The academic building contains three public art galleries for Indianapolis artists and students to display various pieces and exhibits, and a large art library containing a huge collection of literature on art, architecture, design, and creative technologies.

== History ==
=== School of Law Building (1970–2001) ===
Eskenazi Hall was originally built in 1970 and was known simply as the Law School Building. Eskenazi Hall formerly housed the IUPUI School of Law before the Herron School of Art and Design. The School of Law moved from the historic Maennerchor Building to the new building located at 735 West New York Street.

The Indiana Prosecuting Attorneys Association established a new agency at the IUPUI Law School in Eskenazi Hall to provide information and resources to Indiana prosecutors in March 1972. The research institute provided information with Indiana prosecutors, research unusual situations related to current events, changes in laws or judicial procedures, and develop professional development opportunities. In 1973, the School of Law received a $200,000 anonymous donation to expand the existing law library located in the Law School Building. The donation led to the school’s acquisition of 100,000 additional materials to establish itself as a resource and research center for legal professionals. In February 1979, the Law Library received an O.C.L.C. terminal making it the only law library in Indiana with one at the time.

In 1994, the State of Indiana Commission for Higher Education approved the $29 million proposal for the creation of a new building for the School of Law. IUPUI began planning to renovate the current Law School building for the future use of the Herron School of Art and Design. The goal was to bring Herron to the IUPUI main campus and further consolidate all schools in a single location. The IU Trustees estimated that the renovations would cost a total of $6 million.

=== Herron School of Art and Design (2005–present) ===
In May 2001, the IU School of Law moved to the newly built Lawrence Inlow Hall. Eskenazi Hall would undergo extensive renovations to become the new home for the Herron School of Art. The renovations of the old law school building were designed by John Hess, a well-known Indianapolis architect. The groundbreaking for the redesign and renovation of the building began on September 13, 2002. The Allen Whitehill Clowes Charitable Foundation donated $2 million to the school of art to create a 250-seat auditorium in the new building.

In June 2005, the Herron School of Art hosted its grand opening celebration in its new location at Eskenazi Hall on New York Street. The 169,000-square-foot building contained a 5,500-square-foot library, a 240-seat auditorium, a 4,200-square-foot gallery space, several computer labs, four galleries, and 70 art and design studios. It is also celebrated as the unification of all IUPUI schools in one location. The Basile Center for Art, Design, and Public Life was opened at the Herron School of Art in 2005 to connect students with community partners. The center was created by a gift from Frank and Katrina Basile. In 2015, the Think It Make It Lab was established in Eskenazi Hall to promote new technology practices and provide opportunities for research and experimentation.

== Art Galleries ==
=== Robert B. Berkshire, Eleanor Prest Reese, and Dorit and Gerald Paul Galleries ===
The Berkshire, Reese, and Paul Galleries are located on the ground floor at the west end of the Eskenazi Building. The “3,200-square-feet of column-free, environmentally controlled exhibition space” is designed as a premier venue for Indiana contemporary art.

=== Marsh Gallery ===
The Marsh Gallery is a 1,100-square-foot box-shaped gallery with 16-foot ceilings, professional track lighting, and diffused natural light. The gallery is located on the ground floor near the Office of Admissions and Student Services.

=== Frank and Katrina Basile Gallery ===
This 600-square-foot gallery was designed to host smaller-scale exhibitions compared to other galleries. The Basile Gallery is located in the center of the main floor in Eskenazi Hall and adjacent to the Herron Art Library.

== Herron Art Library ==
The Herron Art Library supporting the Herron School of Art and Design at IUPUI is a satellite of the University Library. Through individual donations, the Herron Art Library has developed a museum-caliber collection of 400 artist's books. Drawing from a wide range of media, artists’ books are works of art that are sometimes realized in the form of a book, but not always.

== See also ==
- Indiana University–Purdue University Indianapolis Public Art Collection
- Herron Art Library - Artists' Books Collection
