= Robert Hess (artist) =

American sculptor and art educator (1935–2014)

- Hess at work, 2006
- Born: Robert Henry Hess; August 12, 1935; Brooklyn, New York
- Died: May 8, 2014 (aged 78); Salem, Oregon
- Education: Indiana University (BAF), 1970; Notre Dame (MFA), 1972
- Occupation: College professor
- Years active: 1972–2006
- Known for: Wood carvings; cast and welded metal sculptures
- Notable work: The Drummer; Oceanscape; Rooster; Dixieland; Chutzpah, and Charles Bowles
- Style: Abstract

Robert Henry Hess (August 12, 1935 – May 8, 2014) was an American sculptor and art educator. He was best known for his abstract metal sculptures and wood carvings. Hess served on the faculty of Willamette University in Salem, Oregon, for 34 years. Today, his works are found in prominent public spaces and private collections throughout the Pacific Northwest.

== Early life ==
Hess was born on August 12, 1935, in Brooklyn, New York. As a youth, he regularly rode the New York City Subway to the Metropolitan Museum of Art and other museums around the city. The city also gave him an appreciation for diverse cultures which eventually found its way into his art. In high school, Hess and a friend made large puppets which they used in shows at local grade schools.

After high school, Hess attended Brooklyn College. Initially, he studied medicine. However, within a year, he shifted his focus to arts and began painting. He then moved to Europe where he traveled widely, studying the paintings in museum collections. He copied works by old masters to improve his painting technique. In England, Hess learned to paint in the style of John Constable, selling his paintings through a New York City art dealer. While in England, he also became interested in sculpture. The work of Henry Moore was especially influential on his development as an artist. Moore's abstract works captured human figures as well as aspects of landscape and nature. Following Moore's artistic vision, Hess began producing abstract style sculptures.

When he returned to the United States, Hess enrolled at the Herron School of Art and Design at the Indiana University, receiving a Bachelor of Fine Arts degree in 1970. He then went on to attend graduate school University of Notre Dame. In 1972, Hess won the sculpture award at the Northern Indiana Art Center's annual salon show with his distinctive stone carving Man and Woman which subsequently went on display at the art center. Later that year, he was received a Master of Fine Arts degree from the Notre Dame.

== College professor ==
In the fall of 1972, Hess was hired as an art professor at Willamette University. When he arrived, the university did not have a sculpture studio so Hess began his work in an auditorium attic area. Initially, he taught classes in sculpture and basic design. Later, Hess added classes in figure drawing, structural design, and metalsmithing. Hess eventually began operating a foundry to produce metal sculptures.

In 1977, the State of Oregon added a new wing to the state capitol. Hess was one of seven experts who selected 170 works of art for permanent display in the new capitol wing. As a member of the selection jury, he screened hundreds paintings and sculptures submitted by Oregon's art community and recommended which works should be acquire by the state.

Hess was a gifted teacher as well as an outstanding artist. In his teaching role, he had a significant impact on multiple generations of Willamette students. His students included Marie Watt and Lee Imonen, both became well-known artists in their own right. Hess remained a member of the Willamette faculty for 34 years, retiring from the university in 2006.

After retiring from his college faculty position, Hess was honored as professor emeritus by Willamette University. He also continued to create art from his home studio, producing some of his best work after he retired from teaching. Hess died in Salem on May 8, 2014, at the age of 78.

== Art work ==
Hess was a sculptor, painter, and designer. He is widely recognized as an important Pacific Northwest artist. Over the years, Hess received many public and private commissions for his art work, especially his abstract metal figures and wood carvings. He also won numerous awards for his creative work.

Hess' sculptures are in the American modernist tradition. They ranged from uniquely stylized drummers and other figures to abstract works with intertwining forms and interesting surface textures. Hess was always seeking new shapes and unique structural designs to incorporate into his sculptures. His creations are fanciful and exuberant. He often used bronze or steel for his sculptures. Some of his metal works are welded while other works are cast.

In addition to Henry Moore, Hess was influenced by Constantin Brâncuși, Joan Miró, and Pablo Picasso. He also admired the works of expressionist Ernst Barlach, cubist artist Jacques Lipchitz, and the realist master Auguste Rodin. His work is often compared to Manuel Izquierdo, Lee Kelly, and James Lee Hansen, who are all contemporary Pacific Northwest sculptors.

Sculptures by Hess are located in a number of prominent public spaces as well as many private collections. Several of his sculptures are on permanent exhibit at Willamette University. These include Dixieland and Chutzpah, both sculptures are located in campus buildings. Oceanscape is a featured sculpture at the Hallie Ford Museum of Art along with a number of other works by Hess. His bronze sculpture, Skull, is located in the plaza in front of the Salem Convention Center. The Drummer is in the foyer of the Salem Public Library. In 2014, the library added another Hess sculpture called Falling Books to its art collection. His sculpture titled Rooster is located just outside the entrance to the Bush Barn Art Center, welcoming visitors to the Salem Art Association's museum. Hess also created a realistic life-size statue of Willamette University track and field coach Charles Bowles. The statue is located at McCulloch Stadium in Salem near the campus of Willamette University. The Charles Bowles statue was dedicated in a public ceremony in 2012.

== Exhibitions ==
Hess' art work has been displayed in a number of special museum exhibits and gallery shows including:

- Waterstone Gallery (Portland, Oregon); Sue-Del McCulloch and Robert Hess New Work, 2011
- Arts Council of Lake Oswego (Lake Oswego, Oregon); public display of cast bronze sculpture, Drummer with Rooster, 2007–2009
- Hallie Ford Museum of Art (Salem, Oregon); Robert Hess: Recent Work, 2004
- Fairbanks Gallery (Corvallis, Oregon); Robert Hess: Cast and Forged Bronze Sculpture, 2002–2003
- Hallie Ford Museum of Art (Salem, Oregon); Robert Hess, Sculptures, 1999
- Willamette University (Salem, Oregon); Art Reunion, 1991
- Coos Art Museum (Coos Bay, Oregon); invitational exhibit, 1980
