= Lesley Howarth =

British children's writer

- Born: 29 December 1952 (age 73); Bournemouth, England
- Education: Bournemouth School for Girls; Bournemouth College of Art; Croydon College of Art
- Writing career
- Notable awards: Guardian Children's Fiction Prize (1995)

Lesley Howarth (born 29 December 1952) is a British author of children's and young adult fiction. For the novel Maphead, published by Walker Books in 1994, she won the annual Guardian Children's Fiction Prize, a once-in-a-lifetime book award judged by a panel of British children's writers, and she was a runner-up for the Carnegie Medal. (Note: Today there are usually eight books on the Carnegie shortlist. According to CCSU some runners-up through 2002 were Commended (from 1954) or Highly Commended (from 1966). The latter distinction became approximately annual in 1979; there were 29 highly commended books in 24 years including Howarth and Berlie Doherty for 1994.)

Reviewers including Philip Pullman have remarked upon Howarth's ability to "humanize" highly technical or unusual subjects, a tendency which she calls "the romance of hard things".

== Biography ==
Howarth was born 29 December 1952 in Bournemouth, England. As a child, she attended the Bournemouth School for Girls, then, as an adult, received education from the Bournemouth College of Art and Croydon College of Art.

== Awards ==
The Pits (1996) is a Junior Library Guild book.

In January 2000, The Guardian named Mister Spaceman the children's book of the week.

Awards for Howarth's writing
Year	Title	Award	Result	Ref.
1993	The Flower King	Whitbread Children's Book Award	Shortlist	
1994	MapHead	Carnegie Medal	Shortlist	
1995	MapHead	Guardian Children's Fiction Award	Winner	
1995	Weather Eye	Nestlé Smarties Book Prize (ages 9–11)	Winner	
1995	MapHead	W. H. Smith Mind Boggling Books Award	Shortlist	
1995	MapHead	Young Telegraph Book Award	Shortlist	

== Works ==
- The Flower King (1993)
- MapHead (1994)
- Weather Eye (1995)
- The Pits (1996)
- Fort Biscuit (1996), illustrated by Ann Kronheimer
- Welcome to Inner Space (1997)
- MapHead 2 (1997); US title, Maphead: the return
- Quirx : The Edge of the World (1998)
- Bad Rep (1998), illus. Mark Oliver
- Paulina (1999)
- Yamabusters (1999)
- The Squint (1999), illus. Jeff Cummins
- Aliens for Dinner (1999)
- Mister Spaceman (2000)
- I Managed a Monster (2000)
- No Accident (2000)
- Ultraviolet (2001)
- Carwash (2002)
- Dade County's Big Summer (2002)
- Drive (2004)
- Colossus (2004)
- Calling the Shots (2006)
- Bodyswap: The Boy Who Was 84 (2009)
- Tales from the Sick Bed (London: Catnip, 2009), as by L. P. Howarth

Tales from the Sick Bed: Brainstorms
Tales from the Sick Bed: Fever Dreams
Tales from the Sick Bed: The Medicine Chest

- Swarf (2010)

== See also ==
- Rob Day
