= Rose ffrench, 1st Baroness ffrench =

Rose ffrench, 1st Baroness ffrench (died 8 December 1805), was an Irish peeress.

The eldest daughter of Patrick Dillon of Roscommon, she married on 25 June 1761 Sir Charles ffrench, 1st Baronet (cr.1779), who was later Mayor of Galway. He died in 1784.

In 1798, Lady ffrench was created Baroness ffrench, of Castle ffrench, County Galway, in recognition of the services of her son, Sir Thomas ffrench, 2nd Bt., who was a member of the Catholic Committee. Because she was nominally Protestant, the creation was in keeping with King George III's objection to elevating Catholics to the peerage. Upon her decease, her Catholic son Sir Thomas inherited the barony.

The title and the family name are both spelled with a lower-case double-'f'.

Peerage of Ireland
New creation	Baroness ffrench 1798–1805	Succeeded by Thomas ffrench
