= Herron School of Art and Design =

Public art school in Indianapolis, Indiana, US

IU Herron School of Art + Design
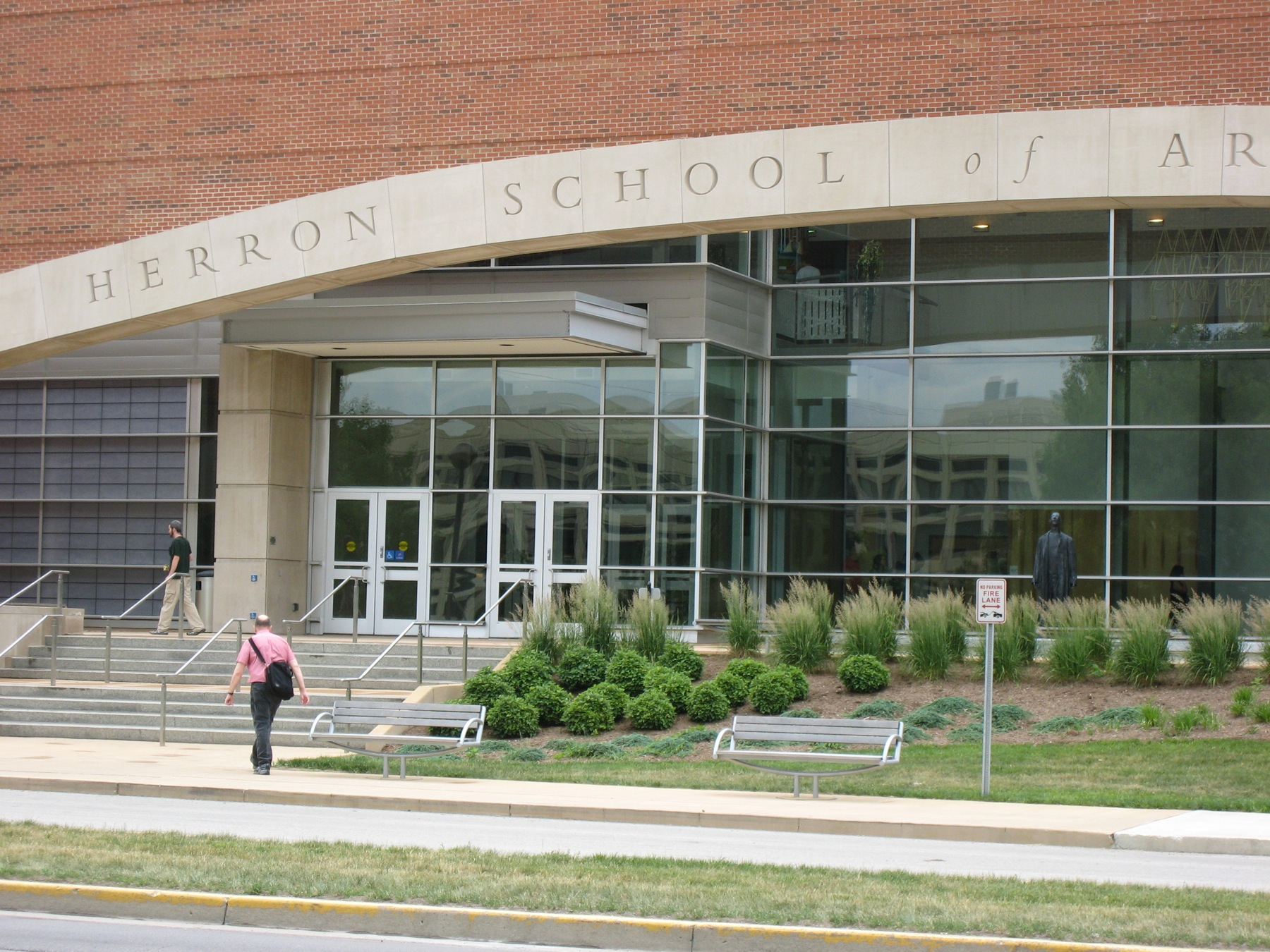
- Sidney and Lois Eskenazi Hall in 2006
- Former names: John Herron Art Institute; Herron School of Art
- Type: Public art school
- Established: January 1902; 124 years ago
- Parent institution: Indiana University
- Dean: Greg Hull
- Faculty: 50
- Students: 800
- Location: Indianapolis, Indiana, U.S. 39.771265°N 86.17148°W
- Campus: Urban
- Website: herron.iupui.edu

Herron School of Art and Design, officially IU Herron School of Art and Design, is a public art school at Indiana University–Indianapolis (IUI) in Indianapolis, Indiana, U.S. It is a professional art school and has been accredited by the National Association of Schools of Art and Design since 1952. The art school was founded in 1902 as the John Herron Art Institute, operating as an independent institution until its acquisition by Indiana University in 1967. In 2005, Herron relocated to Eskenazi Hall on what is now the IUI campus after more than 100 years in the Herron–Morton Place neighborhood of Indianapolis.

Herron includes five galleries that exhibit contemporary works of art by national and international contemporary artists and designers, as well as the work of Herron faculty, alumni, and students, The Basile Center for Art, Design, and Public Life aims to enrich educational and interdisciplinary activities through civic engagement and community partnerships. Herron was ranked 73rd overall by U.S. News & World Report among graduate schools of fine arts in 2022.

== History ==
=== 1800s ===
The Art Association of Indianapolis, formerly the Indiana School of Art, was established in 1883. In 1895, John Herron bequeathed most of his fortune (almost $250,000) to the association, which was headed by suffragette May Wright Sewall. Herron, who had moved to Indianapolis about 15 years earlier, owned several rental properties on the near north side and a large farm in Franklin County, Indiana. His gift came as a complete surprise to the association's members. Herron stipulated that the money be used to build a museum and art school in his name. (Due to inflation, $250,000 in 1895 would be equivalent to about $7 million in 2014).

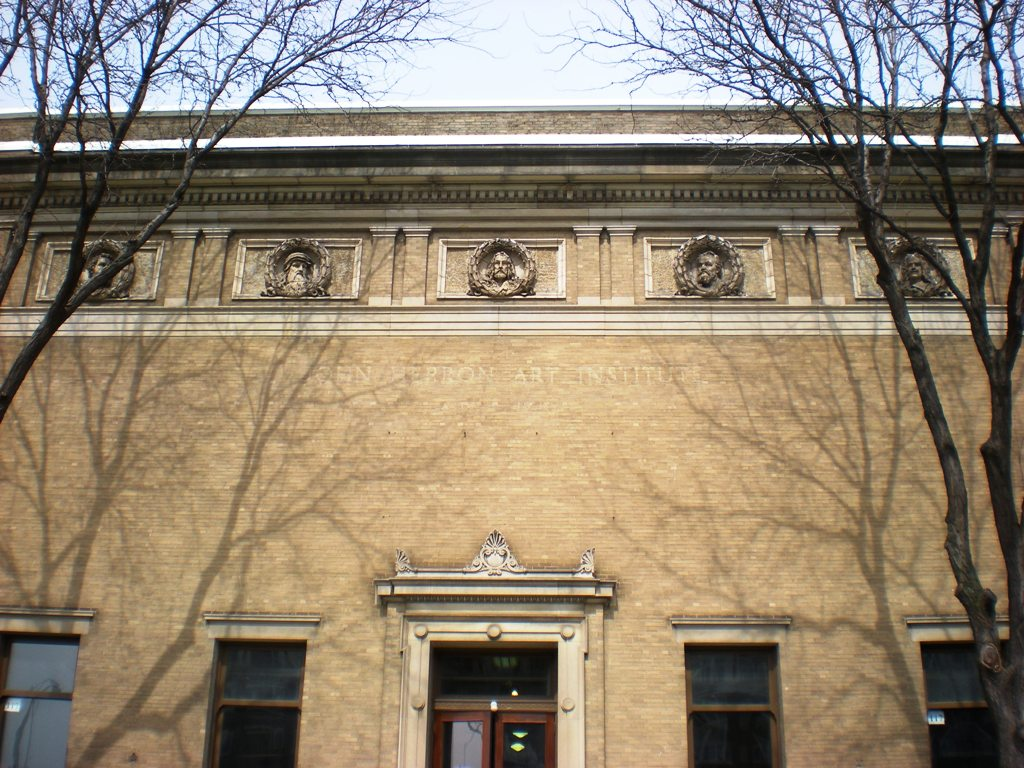
Former home of the art school, now known as Herron High School. "John Herron Art Institute" is still visible on the building's façade in this image from 2010.

=== 1900s ===
As a result of Herron's gift, the John Herron Art Institute was formed in 1902 to serve as an art museum and an art school. The Institute's Herron Museum, an Italian Renaissance Revival-style building, was designed by Vonnegut and Bohn architects and located at 1701 North Pennsylvania Street in the present-day Morton Place. The institute's main building was designed by Paul Philippe Cret in 1929 and was the second facility in the nation designed specifically for art education.

The first core faculty included Indiana Impressionist painters of the Hoosier Group: T.C. Steele, J. Ottis Adams, William Forsyth, Richard Gruelle, and Otto Stark. The sculptor Rudolph Schwarz was also in the first core faculty.

=== 1960s ===
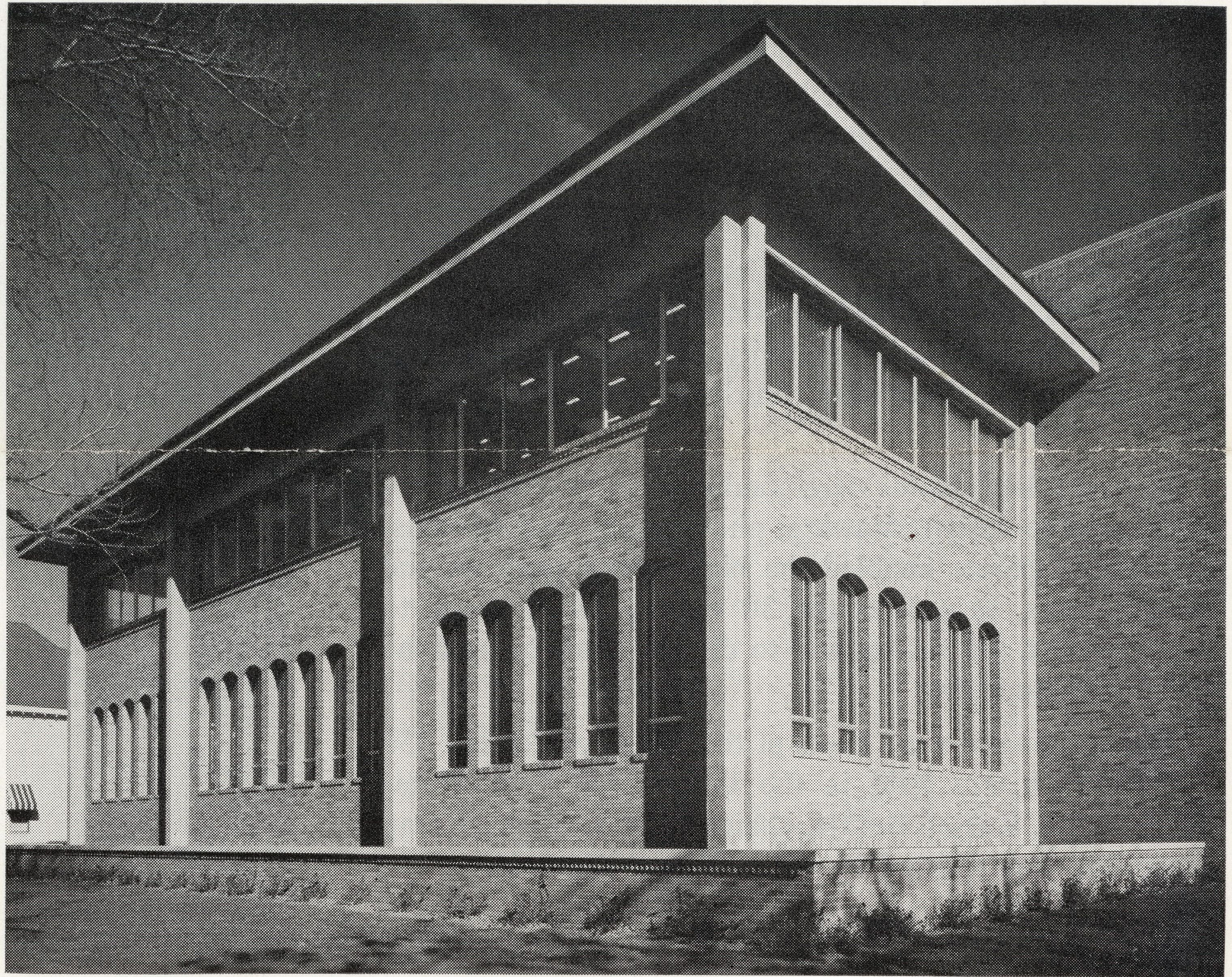
Fesler Hall, circa 1965

Fesler Hall, constructed in 1962, was a major addition to the John Herron Art Institute site along N. Pennsylvania St. It was Indianapolis architect Evans Woollen III's first civic commission. The three-story academic building was a freestanding wing addition that connected via a covered walkway to the original, Cret-designed main building. Both of these structures are still standing. Woollen's addition was noted for its use of reinforced concrete and exposed columns, typical of Brutalist architecture, and its deeply coffered ceilings. The project was funded through a bequest of Caroline Marmon Fesler, a former board member and president of the Art Association.

In 1967, the Herron School of Art became a school of Indiana University. Two years later, it became part of Indiana University–Purdue University Indianapolis (IUPUI), located near downtown Indianapolis. In 1970, the Indianapolis Museum of Art separated from the school, taking with it a majority of Herron's art collection.

=== 2000s ===
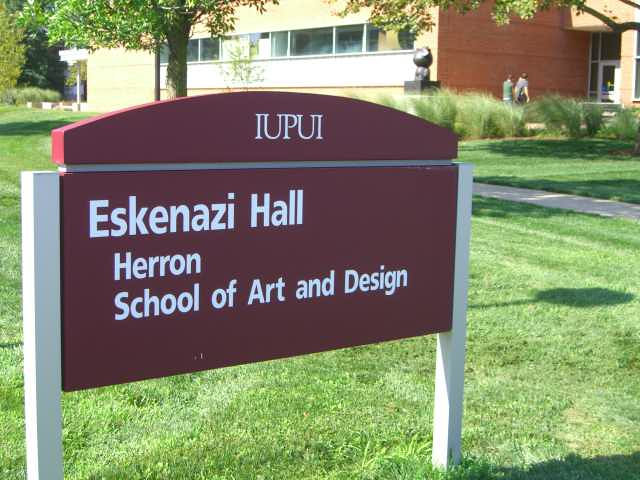
IUPUI campus sign for Herron School of Art and Design

The Herron School of Art and Design launched a capital campaign to raise funds for new buildings in 1999, and in 2000 a ceramic arts facility was opened.

In 2000, Herron School of Art and Design was among the earliest tenants to set up residency in the recently established Harrison Center.

In 2003, The Herron Chronicle was published detailing the past 100 years of the school's history.

In 2005, Eskenazi Hall, the current home of the school, was completed. This 169,000-square-foot (15,700 m^{2}) facility tripled the amount of space available to Herron students and includes a 5,500-square-foot (510 m^{2}) library, a 240-seat auditorium, 4,200 square feet (390 m^{2}) of gallery space, and several computer labs.

Since 2006, Herron's original academic buildings have housed Herron High School, a classical liberal arts charter high school.

== Degrees offered ==
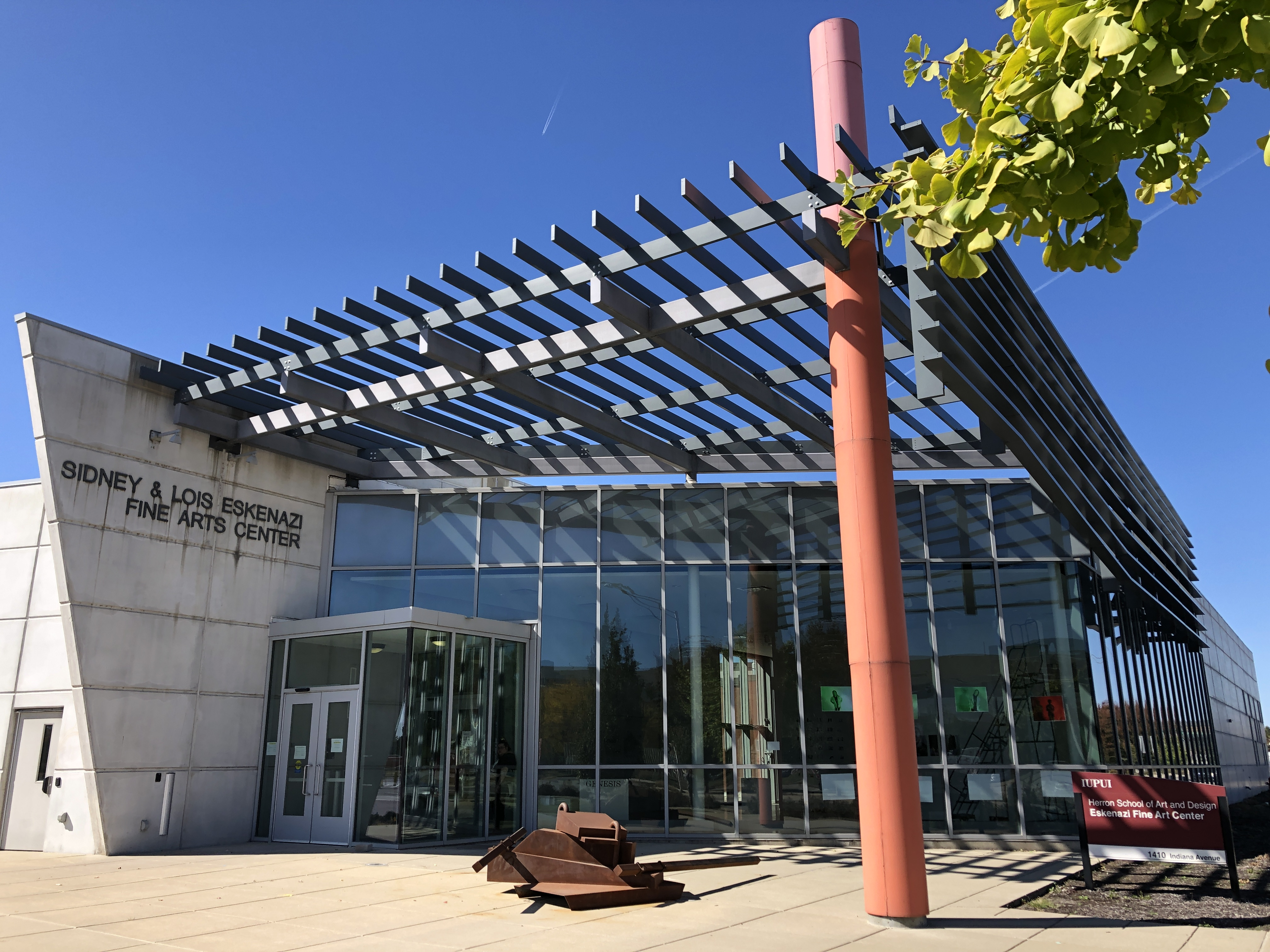
Sidney & Lois Eskenazi Fine Arts Center, completed in 2013

Bachelor of Arts

- Art History

Bachelor of Art Education
Bachelor of Fine Arts

- Ceramics
- Furniture Design
- Drawing and Illustration
- Integrative Studio Practices
- Painting
- Photography
- Printmaking
- Sculpture
- Visual Communication Design

Master of Art Therapy
Master of Fine Arts

- Visual Communication Design
- Visual Art

Minors and Certificates

- Art History Minor
- Book Arts Minor
- Design Production Minor
- Design Thinking for Collaborative Innovation Certificate
- Pre-Art Therapy Certificate
- Studio Art & Technology Minor

== Benefactors ==
Caroline Marmon Fesler: The daughter of local industrialist and automobile manufacturer Daniel W. Marmon, she studied painting in Europe. Later, she became a well-known art collector, especially of 20th-century modernist works, many of which she later gave to the Herron Museum—including Grey Hills by her friend, Georgia O'Keeffe. Along with Sullivan, Fesler propelled the Herron Museum into the era of modern art.

Herman C. Krannert: Founder and president of Inland Container Corporation, Krannert agreed to take charge of the Art Association in 1960, at a point when the organization was struggling to stay afloat. Krannert insisted the group reorganize its board and its way of doing business, including creating the position of board chairman—he became the first person to have that title and he held it for 12 years. His tenure culminated in relocating the museum from the Herron campus at 16th and Pennsylvania streets to its current site at W. 38th St. and Michigan Rd., and the association's name was changed to the Indianapolis Museum of Art.

== Notable alumni ==
- Wayman Elbridge Adams
- Garo Antreasian
- Simon Baus
- Andrew Blauvelt
- Norman Bridwell
- Beulah H. Brown
- Francis Focer Brown
- Carol Ann Carter
- Vija Celmins
- Georgiabelle Clark
- Aaron S. Coleman
- Jay Hall Connaway
- Rob Day
- William Forsyth
- Ray H. French
- Marie Goth
- Carl Graf
- Don Gummer
- John Wesley Hardrick
- Robert Hess
- Felrath Hines
- Wilbert L. Holloway
- Bill Justice
- Eleanor Lambert
- Rinaldo Paluzzi
- Bill Peet
- Florence Smithburn
- Kenneth E. Tyler
- Samuel E Vázquez
- Robert Edward Weaver
- Cornett Wood
- Hale Woodruff
- Louise Zaring

== See also ==
- Community Museum Laboratory
- Hoosier Group
- Irvington Group
