= Adrienne French =

American photographer

- Born: 1987 (age 38–39); Akron, OH
- Occupations: Artist, photographer, creative design director, marketing analyst
- Website: www.adriennefrenchphotography.com

Adrienne French (born 1987) is a fine art photographer specialising in urban landscape. She is the granddaughter of the artist Ray H. French.

== Education ==
Born in Akron, Ohio, French attended Ohio Wesleyan University in Delaware, Ohio. While at Ohio Wesleyan University, French was one of the only freshmen in the photography program, where she studied traditional wet darkroom methods. After her freshman year, she transferred to Ringling College of Art and Design in Sarasota, Florida, where she learned digital photography technology, digital media, and printing.

== Exhibitions ==
French has exhibited in group shows around the country. In 2011, her "Abstractions" exhibition at the Halcyon Art Gallery in Terre Haute, Indiana, featured an array of her black-and-white and color photography. In 2013, the Kenneth Paul Lesko Gallery in Cleveland, Ohio exhibited her "Chronos Chrysalis" portfolio, characterized by abstract photographs that invite the viewer to see the beauty in the often overlooked urban environment.

== Collections ==
French's work is in private and public collections, including the Midwest Museum of American Art in Elkhart, Indiana.
