= Ray H. French =

American printmaker, painter, sculptor and artistic innovator

- Born: May 16, 1919; Terre Haute, Indiana
- Died: April 21, 2000 (aged 80); Greencastle, Indiana

Ray H. French (May 16, 1919 – April 21, 2000) was an American printmaker, painter, sculptor and artistic innovator. He attended the John Herron School of Art and received his bachelor's degree and Masters of Fine Arts at the University of Iowa under professor and artist Mauricio Lasansky. While French studied, traveled, and exhibited nationally and internationally, he remained dedicated to his home state of Indiana, which served as a strong artistic inspiration to him. In addition to his artistic career, French was also on the faculty of DePauw University from 1948 to 1984. Following his retirement from university service, French continued to create artwork in his private studio until his death in Greencastle, Indiana.

== Early life ==
Born in Terre Haute, Indiana, on May 16, 1919, to parents Edgar and Radie Mae, French demonstrated his artistic abilities from an early age. For a youth with humble beginnings, art was a luxurious, even rebellious, aspiration. As a child, French was first exposed to art by Mabel Mikel Williams who taught both in Vigo County elementary schools and also private students. His interests grew as he was encouraged further at Woodrow Wilson Jr. High School by art teacher Nola E. Williams.

Porcupine, Engraving, 1949

== Education ==
After high school, French attended the Indiana University John Herron School of Art on scholarship. During World War II, he enlisted in the Army Air Force and was stationed in Colorado developing reconnaissance photos. While in Colorado, he had the opportunity to study watercolor with Adolf Dehn at the University of Colorado.

Following World War II, French returned to John Herron School of Art on the G.I. Bill and then transferred to the University of Iowa, where he obtained his BFA in 1947 and MFA in 1948. In Iowa, French evolved under the mentorship of celebrated printmaker Mauricio Lasansky who had established one of the first printmaking MFA programs in the country. French's 1949 engraving entitled Porcupine is indicative of this training and was exhibited at the Museum of Modern Art in 1949.

Always striving to improve his craft, French continued his education at the Accademia di Belle Arti in Florence, Italy and the Hobart School of Welding Technology in the 1960s.

== Career ==
French was an accomplished artist who excelled in creating engravings, etchings, embossings, graphic constructions, watercolors, pastels, and metal and Plexiglas sculptures. French's 1959 etching Enchantment remains particularly illustrative of his characteristic use of etching and soft ground intaglio. Enchantment was exhibited at the Brooklyn Museum of Art in 1960 and received the Pennell Purchase Prize from the Library of Congress the same year.

Throughout this artistic career, French was also Professor of Art at DePauw University 1948-84 where he taught printmaking and art history and was head of the art department 1970–1978. From 1963 to 1964 he and his family lived in Florence, Italy while he attended classes at the Accademia di Belle Arti. He was also Curator of the University Art Collection 1978–1984. In 1980, French opened the Center Street Gallery behind his home near the DePauw campus where he continued his work following his retirement in 1984.

Enchantment, Etching, 1959

== Legacy ==
French exhibited in national exhibitions since 1944 including 86 one-man exhibitions in the United States and Italy.

His work is in over 500 collections including The Museum of Modern Art, the Library of Congress, Metropolitan Museum of Art, the Smithsonian American Art Museum, the Victoria and Albert Museum, the Bibliothèque Nationale, the Brooklyn Museum, the Philadelphia Museum of Art, the Denver Art Museum, the New York Public Library, the Boston Public Library, Midwest Museum of American Art, the Minneapolis Institute of Art, and the Syracuse University Art Galleries.

Over his lifetime, French also received many grants and honors including over 58 prizes and purchase awards. Specifically, French was awarded an Eli Lily Grant for an extensive tour in Europe in 1961 and received a Ford Foundation Grant in 1969 to develop a new medium in printmaking known as graphic construction.

French and his family were also avid art collectors whose collection now comprises 5 percent of the permanent collection of the Swope Art Museum in the artist's hometown of Terre Haute, Indiana. His granddaughter Adrienne French is a fine art photographer.
