= Catherine French =

American civil engineer

Catherine Ellen Wolfgram French is an American civil engineer whose research has concerned the effects of fatigue and earthquakes on reinforced concrete buildings and bridges. She is a professor emerita in the University of Minnesota Department of Civil, Environmental, and Geo-Engineering, after previously being College of Science and Engineering Distinguished Professor and a member of the Academy of Distinguished Teachers at the University of Minnesota.

French is a 1975 graduate of Burnsville High School in Minnesota. After graduating from the University of Minnesota in 1979, she continued her studies at the University of Illinois Urbana-Champaign, where she received a master's degree in 1980 and a Ph.D. in 1984. After completing her doctorate, she returned to the University of Minnesota as a faculty member in 1984.

French became a distinguished member of the American Society of Civil Engineers in 2018. She is also an honorary member of the American Concrete Institute. She was named to the University of Minnesota Academy of Distinguished Teachers in 2019. In 2024, she was elected to the National Academy of Engineering "for design, safety, and construction of structural concrete buildings and bridges".
