= Jennifer French =

Jennifer French may refer to:

- Jennifer French (politician), Canadian politician
- Jennifer French (sailor) (born 1971), American Paralympic sailor
