= Christopher French (theologian) =

Irish theologian

Christopher French (fl. c. 1650–c.1713) was an Irish theologian.

A member of the French family of Norman origin, that was part of the Tribes of Galway, French joined the Dominican Order while in Galway and travelled to Louvain to complete his studies.

He was professor of divinity at the Dominican Convent at Rome, and was to hold a similar post for nine years at Osimo in Ancona, at the request of Cardinal Pallavicini. He afterwards returned to Louvain where he was Regent of the Irish Schools.
