= Woman's Art Club Cultural Center =

Community Center

Coordinates: 39°08′56″N 84°22′20″W

The Woman's Art Club Cultural Center, also known as "The Barn", is a community arts and culture center located in Mariemont, Ohio and operated by the Woman's Art Club of Cincinnati Foundation.

The center offers art exhibits, classes, lectures, a summer art camp and social events. The building includes a gallery for exhibits, four art studios, two classrooms, and a kitchen for catered events.

== The Barn ==
Originally called the Resthaven Barn and built in 1924, this creamery preceded the Village of Mariemont and was located in an area called Resthaven Gardens. The Barn was part of a 26-acre farm group and included a health facility. Mariemont founder Mary Emery's benevolent plan was to provide for the retirees of the Emery Industries. In addition to horse stables and cattle pens, there was a hen house, the Presidents’ Nursery containing trees and shrubs from Mount Vernon, and community gardens. Only the Barn and the gardener's cottage remain from the original farm group.

In 1940, the Thomas J Emery Memorial voted to discontinue operations and it was transferred to the Village of Mariemont for use as the Maintenance Department. The Village continued to use the building, primarily for equipment storage, although it was listed on the National Register of Historic Places in 1979.

Mariemont moved the Maintenance Department in 2005 leaving the Resthaven Barn vacant with an uncertain future. After conducting a village wide survey, a majority of the residents stated that they would not want the barn demolished. However, costs in renovations limited its practicality for a potential purchaser.

By October 2006, the Village published a Legal Notice offering the Barn for sale by sealed bidding process. A bid of $50,000 was received from the Woman's Art Club of Cincinnati and it was accepted on April 16, 2007. The 10,000 square foot Barn offered excellent potential for an arts center with space for classes and a permanent art gallery, while at the same time preserving the historical integrity of the building.

The Woman's Art Club was founded in 1892 but had never had a permanent home. The club was determined to restore the building while maintaining all of the original elements and detail. The obtained an architect, John Grier, that served on an area landmark commission and demonstrated experience in historic preservation. With a generous gift from Carl Linder Jr. Grants and other private donations, Phase 1 was completed and a spacious classroom, small studio and a state-of-the-art gallery had been renovated.

The name of the facility changed to Woman's Art Club Cultural Center. An appropriation was made thorough the Ohio Capital Spending Bill and the Ohio Cultural Facilities Commission for the completion of Phase 2. This act made restoring the first floor of the Barn possible.
