= Word-initial ff =

Use of double F at the beginning of a word

Word-initial ff is the digraph ⟨ff⟩ occurring at the beginning of a word. It sometimes occurs capitalized as ⟨Ff⟩, and sometimes as the lowercase ⟨ff⟩.

In English, word-initial ⟨ff⟩ notably occurs in certain proper names descended from Middle English, such as Ffoulkes; such is otherwise not a valid orthographic positioning for this digraph. In these names it may unusually occur uncapitalized, as in the surname of British historian Charles ffoulkes, in violation of typical English conventions prescribing the capitalization of proper nouns. This spelling has been explained as a paleographic misunderstanding, likely stemming from the visual similarity of capital ⟨F⟩ to a duplicated lowercase ⟨f⟩ in medieval English court hand.

In Welsh, FF is a distinct letter of the alphabet, placed between F and G in alphabetical order; it commonly occurs word-initially, including in some place names loaned into English like Ffestiniog. In historical Spanish orthography, word-initial ⟨ff⟩ had a distinct phonemic meaning from ⟨f⟩, which is used in all cases in modern Spanish.

== In English ==
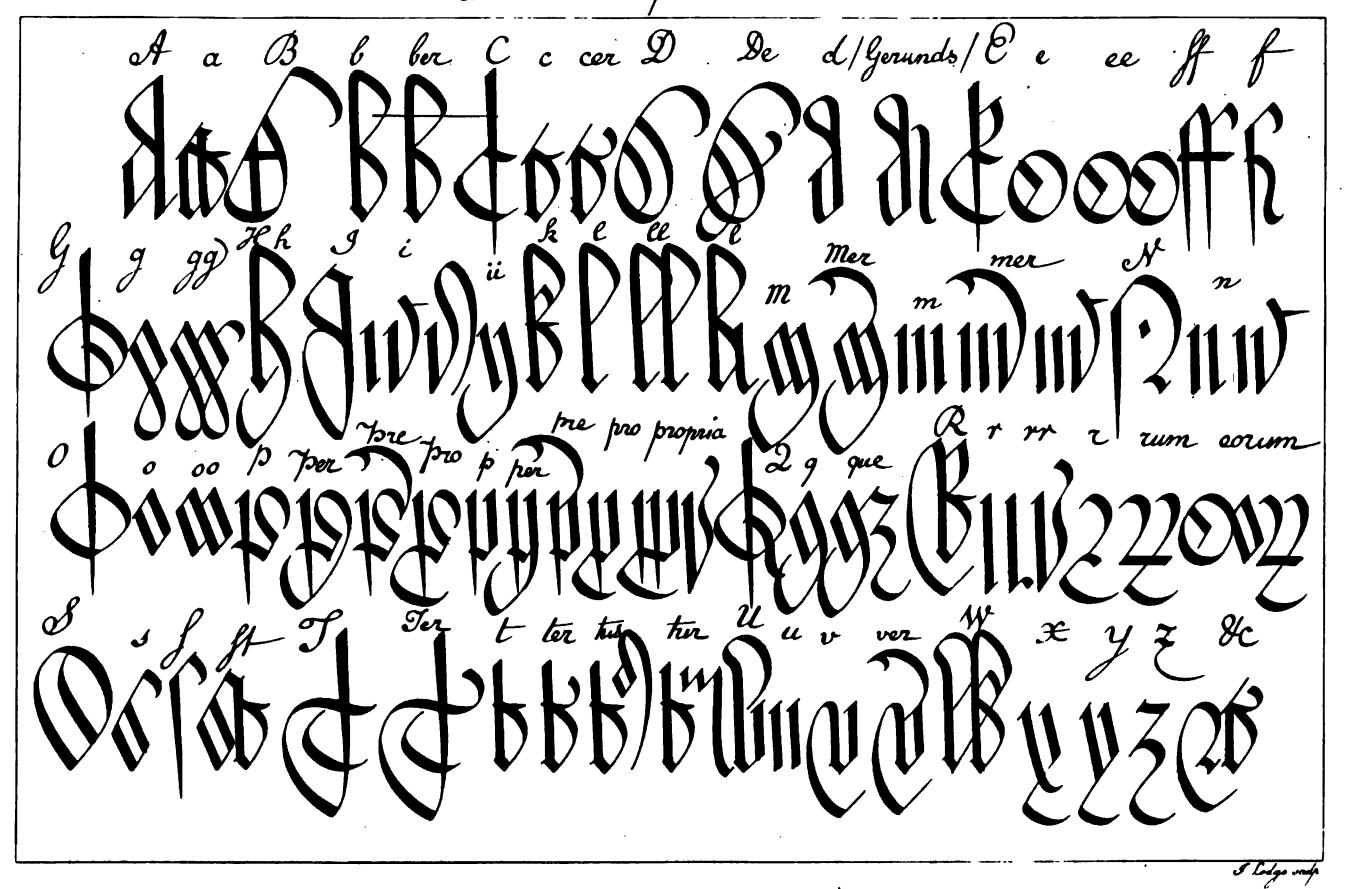
Early modern court hand alphabet, showing "ff" used as the equivalent of a capital F

English proper names are conventionally capitalized, which makes the appearance of a lowercase letter at the beginning of one unusual; further, word-initial ⟨ff⟩, capitalized or otherwise, appears in no English words besides certain proper names and in transcribed manuscripts. Mark Antony Lower in his Patronymica Brittanica (1860) called this spelling "needless", "ridiculous", and "originat[ing] in a foolish mistake":

☛ FF. The double-f is used in some surnames, quite needlessly, in affectation of antiquity: e. g., Ffrench, Ffarington, Ffoulkes, Ffooks, Ffolliott. Now as double-f never did and never will begin an English word, this is ridiculous, and originates in a foolish mistake respecting the ff of old manuscripts, which is no duplication, but simply a capital f.

Later in the 19th century, paleographer Edward Maunde Thompson wrote from the British Museum:

The English legal handwriting of the Middle Ages has no capital F. A double f (ff) was used to represent the capital letter. In transcribing, I should write F, not ff; e. g. Fiske, not ffiske.

Word-initial ⟨Ff⟩ is also occurs in proper names loaned from the Welsh language, in which ff is treated as a single letter and can occur normally in any position within a word. H. L. Mencken writes in a supplement to The American Language that, in English transcription of Welsh proper names, "the initial Ff is sometimes written ff, but this is an error." The replacement of manuscript word-initial ⟨ff⟩ with ⟨F⟩ is now a scholarly convention. Usage persists in the aforementioned Middle English-derived names, such as Madeleine ffrench-Mullen and Richard ffrench-Constant.

== In Spanish ==
It has been argued that word-initial ⟨ff⟩ was used in written Spanish around 1500 to indicate the phonetic difference between an f-sound and an aspirated h. It was used in medieval Spanish, having been introduced around the turn of the 14th century, and was used infrequently through Early Modern Spanish. Unlike in English, the first F of the digraph was always capitalized when it occurred in proper nouns. The actual pronunciation was dynamic, with the aspiration being dropped from the time when Madrid became the Spanish capital (1561). The word-initial ⟨ff⟩ spelling convention lagged behind this phonetic development, providing a way of tracking pronunciations after they had become obsolete.

== Stylistic ligature ==
⟨ff⟩ is a distinct stylistic ligature in many digital and print typefaces. The ligature itself appears in Unicode as U+FB00 ﬀ LATIN SMALL LIGATURE FF.
