= Richard ffrench-Constant =

Professor of molecular natural history

Richard ffrench-Constant FRS is a professor of molecular natural history at the University of Exeter.
