= IUPUI University Library =

University library in Indianapolis, Indiana, U.S.

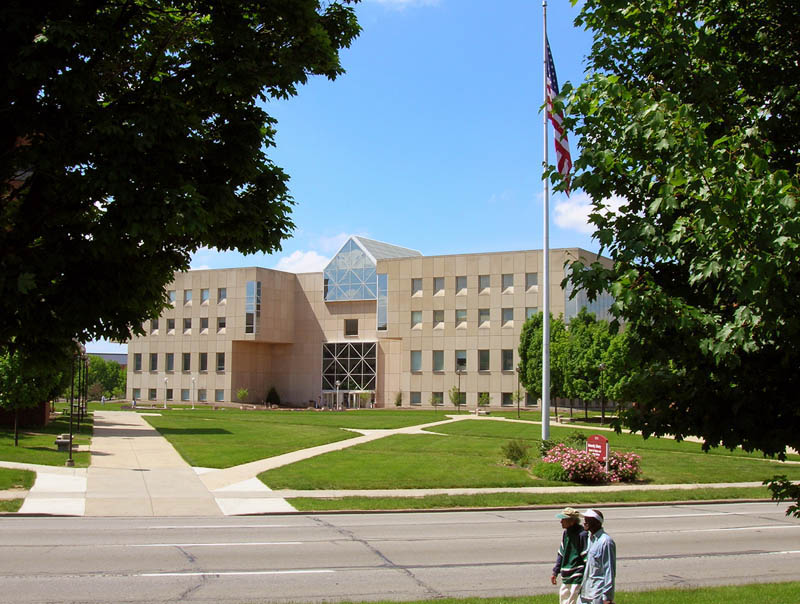
- 39.773071°N 86.172019°W
- Established: 1994

Collection
- Size: 1.3 million volumes

Other information
- Director: Kristi Palmer
- Website: www.ulib.iupui.edu

IUPUI University Library is the university library of Indiana University–Purdue University Indianapolis. IUPUI is an urban campus of Indiana University and Purdue University in Indianapolis, Indiana, United States. Indiana University is the managing partner.

== Facilities ==
Designed by Edward Larrabee Barnes and constructed at a cost of $32 million, the IUPUI University Library officially opened in its current location on April 8, 1994. With nearly a million patron visits a year, plus staff and resources that support all of IUPUI's more than 200 degree programs, the IUPUI University Library is a public academic research library.

Serving as a centerpiece for the IUPUI library system, the University Library provides academic and community patrons with wide variety of study and learning spaces. The five-story facility houses hundreds of study carrels, group study rooms, multimedia classrooms, a 100-seat auditorium, and the Academic Commons—a flexible group study area equipped with computer and multimedia technology.

== Collection ==
The library's holdings include more than 1,338,889 volumes, 36,000 current periodicals and journals, 1.197 million microforms, and 152,400 government documents and audiovisual materials. Services are available to university students, faculty, and staff, as well as individual citizens, businesses, professional firms, and public agencies. The library's holdings are accessed through a computer network linking Indiana University libraries statewide, and an interlibrary loan system makes available additional local, state, and national academic library resources.

The library's Joseph and Matthew Payton Philanthropic Studies Library is a collection for study and research on philanthropy and nonprofit organizations. Research materials include books, audio and video materials, specialized periodicals in the field, and dissertations. The collection contains works from all disciplines as they relate to aspects of voluntary action.

The University Library is also home to the Ruth Lilly Special Collections and Archives which holds the IUPUI University Archives, Philanthropy Archives, and the manuscript collections for the study of German-Americana. The Philanthropy Archives contains primary resources for research that include the historical records of organizations and individuals that have worked as advocates for the nonprofit sector, fund raising firms that help nonprofit organizations raise money, foundations and individual philanthropists, organizations devoted to the study of philanthropy, and nonprofit organizations that provide social services, particularly in central Indiana.

== History ==
The IUPUI University Library groundbreaking ceremony took place on August 1, 1990. After the new library was completed, the University Archives moved from the Joseph T. Taylor Hall (formerly known as the Blake Street Library) to the lower floor of the new building. Ruth Lilly donated $2 million to create a new state-of-the-art facility for the archives and its collection. The archives subsequently became known as the Ruth Lilly Special Collections and Archives. The Blake Street Library and 38th Street Science and Engineering Library merged into the new University Library to consolidate resources on campus.

The original design of the library was five floors and 256,000 square feet (23,800 m^{2}) with a volume capacity of a million items. There were 1,740 study spaces, two classrooms, a 100-seat auditorium on the lower level, 641 study carrels, an individual learning center on the first floor, 42 group study rooms, 40 faculty study rooms, and two rooms for visually impaired students. The dedication ceremony took place on April 8, 1994. In 1995, IUPUI created the Center for Teaching and Learning inside the University Library. The purpose of the center was to “assist faculty in navigating the World Wide Web”. Since then, the center has collaborated with Academic Affairs, University Information Technology Services, and University Library to advance professional development. The final design consisted of the library administration offices, a faculty development room, and the School of Library and Information Science on the first floor; a circulation desk and periodical department on the second floor; and the Adaptive Learning Center on the third floor.

Phase III of the University Library construction was completed with the dedication of the Wood Plaza. The plaza design included a main fountain shaped like a ziggurat or stepped pyramid of green granite with water flowing from the top of the pyramid, collecting and cascading over five distinct levels. The fountain also has built-in lighting. Two smaller fountains were planned to be built in the brick landing area near the base of the staircase. In addition, the plaza included brick and concrete walkways, landscaped gardens with trees and plantings, seating areas, and lighting around the courtyard for night usage. The plaza was designed by Singh Associates and marked the completion of the landscape work surrounding the University Library. The University Library received an Achievement award during "A Monumental Affair", the 19th Annual Awards for Excellence in Design, Development, Construction and Beautification in Indianapolis. The Achievement Award gives recognition annually to three structures that have "contributed to the quality of life through the enhancement and beautification of Marion County’s visual and physical environment," according to an A1A publication.

Beginning in 2002, University Library and the Herron School of Art partnered together to allow one student from the Herron to display their sculpture in the library atrium. In 2007, the University Library established the Learning Commons and invited the University Writing Center to share the space. At the beginning of the Fall 2009 semester, University Library opened an international newsroom through the Office of Diversity. The newsroom offers satellite international newsfeeds for students to stay connected to global events. Secondly, the library opened a dedicated skype conferencing room on the second floor. Later that year, University Library worked with Conner Prairie to digitize a collection of textiles that were collected by Ruth and Eli Lilly beginning as early as the 1940s. The collection was published online at the end of 2009.

In 2010, a new technology classroom was constructed on the second floor in the Academic Commons area to assist students in information literacy and technology skills. Following this trend, the library opened a new learning lab dedicated to library science education in 2011. In 2012, IUPUI worked with design firms to redesign 2,800 square feet (260 m^{2}) to create more innovative group and individual study spaces. In the spring of 2014, the Center for Digital Scholarship was established out of the growing digital scholarship program at the library. In the fall of 2014, University Library created a physical space for the IUPUI Arts and Humanities Institute in the Office of the Vice Chancellor for Research. In 2017, University Library underwent its first major renovation of the third and fourth floor to create more space for seating, power outlets, and group study areas. In addition to the fourth floor renovation, the library opened a new Virtual and Augmented Reality Lab. On June 17, 2020, the University Library unveiled its new seed library in partnership with the IUPUI Office of Sustainability that allows users to obtain seeds for free.

== Herron Art Library ==
The Herron Art Library supporting the Herron School of Art and Design at IUPUI is a satellite of the University Library. Through individual donations, the Herron Art Library has developed a museum-caliber collection of 400 artist's books. Drawing from a wide range of media, artists’ books are works of art that are sometimes realized in the form of a book, but not always.

== Honors College ==
In 2010, IUPUI opened its new Honors College in the basement of the University Library. The new Honors College space was designed by Rowland Design, Inc. The project cost a total of $900,000 that included $670,600 for renovations $156,300 for furnishings, and $77,000 for new technology.

== Journalism Library ==
Books, journals, trade publications, and newspapers used by faculty and students in journalism are housed in the University Library.

== Payton Philanthropic Studies Library ==
The Joseph & Matthew Payton Philanthropic Library & Philanthropic Archival Collection houses materials on social movements, ethical and moral issues, nonprofit management, religion in American public life, and religious traditions of charity and philanthropy. The Philanthropic Library was originally located on the lower level of the library following its opening. In 1998, the reference and periodical areas were renovated to make room for the relocation of the Payton Philanthropic Library to the second floor. The dedication for the relocation was held on April 28, 1999. In the Fall of 2015, the Payton Philanthropic Studies Library was redesigned with a new space for Robert L. Payton's personal library.

== Ruth Lilly Special Collections and Archives ==
Upon completion of the library's construction, the archives moved from the Blake Street Library, now known as Joseph T. Taylor Hall, to the lower level across from the philanthropic library. The mission of the archives is to collect materials that support faculty, students, and community success. Papers are collected in four thematic areas:

- Philanthropy, which includes the records of foundations, nonprofit organizations, fundraising firms, associations, and individuals
- German-Americana, which includes the records of national and local organizations focused on the American Turners and similar groups
- General Collections, which contain the records of individuals and organizations with ties to the university and Indianapolis
- University Archives, which preserves the official records of IUPUI and its various predecessor institutions

In 2003, the University Library received a donation of the books, artwork, and personal papers of philosopher Paul Weiss. The Weiss collection includes more than 6,500 books with an emphasis in philosophy, art, and literature. The collection was of great interest to the IUPUI Institute for American Thought, formerly known as the Center for American Studies. The personal papers and artwork were transferred to special collections.

== Online resources ==
With various national and local partners, the IUPUI University Library has created over 40 digital libraries and on-line resources.
