= Koci =

Koci may refer to:

- Kočí, Czech surname
- Kočí (Chrudim District), a municipality and village in the Czech Republic
- Koći, a village in Montenegro
- Koçi, Albanian surname
- Koci Cliffs, an Antarctic cliff

== See also ==
- Kuci (disambiguation)
