= Kocsis =

Kocsis (Hungarian pronunciation: [ˈkot͡ʃiʃ]) is a Hungarian surname meaning 'coachman', derived from the word kocsi ('coach').

Variations of Kocsis in other languages include Kocis, Kočiš and Cociș. Notable people with the surname Kocsis and variants include:

Kocsis

- Adrián Kocsis (born 1991), Hungarian footballer
- Adrienn Kocsis (born 1973), Hungary-born Peruvian badminton player
- Ann Kocsis (1910–1972), American painter
- Antal Kocsis (1905–1994), Hungarian boxer
- Chuck Kocsis (1913–2006), American amateur golfer
- Dominik Kocsis (born 2002), Hungarian footballer
- Elemér Kocsis (1910–1981), Hungarian-Romanian footballer
- Erzsébet Kocsis (born 1965), Hungarian handball player
- Evelin Viktória Kocsis (born 2006), Hungarian rhythmic gymnast
- Ferenc Kocsis (born 1953), Hungarian wrestler
- Gábor Kocsis (born 1985), Hungarian football player
- Gejza Kocsis (1910–1958), Czechoslovak-Hungarian footballer
- Gergő Kocsis (born 1994), Hungarian footballer
- Imre Antal Kocsis (born 1948), Hungarian politician
- István Kocsis, multiple people
- James Kocsis, professor of psychiatry at Weill Cornell Medical College and Payne Whitney Psychiatric Clinic
- János Kocsis (1951–2025), Hungarian wrestler
- Károly Kocsis (1929–2016), Hungarian gymnast
- Lajos Kocsis (1947–2000), Hungarian footballer
- Máté Kocsis (born 1981), Hungarian jurist
- Miklós Kocsis (1932–2004), Hungarian sports shooter
- Olivio Kocsis-Cake (born 1980), Hungarian politician
- Péter Fülöp Kocsis (born 1963), Hungarian Greek Catholic archbishop
- Sándor Kocsis (1929–1979), Hungarian footballer
- Tibor Kocsis (born 1981), Hungarian singer
- Zoltán Kocsis (1952–2016), Hungarian pianist, conductor, and composer

Kocis

- Bryan Kocis (1962–2007), also known as Bryan Phillips, gay pornographic film director
- Ján Eugen Kočiš (1926–2019), Slovak-Czech Ruthenian Greek Catholic hierarch
- Tereza Kočiš (born 1934), also written Tereza Košiš, Serbian gymnast and Olympian who competed for Yugoslavia

Cociș

- Francisc Cociș (born 1930), Romanian gymnast
- Răzvan Cociș (born 1983), Romanian footballer

== See also ==
- Kociszew (disambiguation)
