= Koçi =

Koçi is an Albanian surname. Notable people with the surname include:

- Akil Mark Koci (born 1946), Kosovo Albanian composer
- Amanda Ava Koçi, known as Ava Max (born 1994), American singer of Albanian origin
- Elez Koçi (1856–1916), Albanian activist
- Eni Koçi (born 1996), Albanian singer and songwriter
- Ervin Koçi, Albanian politician
- Ervis Koçi, multiple people
- Gentian Koçi, Albanian film director
- Hafiz Sabri Koçi (1921–2004), Albanian cleric
- Koçi Bey (died 1650), Albanian Ottoman bureaucrat
- Koçi Xoxe (1911–1949), Albanian politician

== See also ==
- Kočí, Czech surname
- Kočiš (surname)
