= Kočí =

Kočí (coachman in Czech) is a Czech surname. Notable people with the surname include:

- Boris Kočí (born 1964), footballer
- David Kočí (born 1981), ice hockey player
- Irena Kočí (born 1955), politician
- Martin Koči (born 1993), Slovak rally driver
- Přemysl Kočí (1917–2003), artist
- Václav Kočí (born 1979), ice hockey player

== See also ==
- Kočí (Chrudim District), a municipality and village in the Czech Republic
