= Arthur Hill Gilbert =

American painter

Arthur Hill Gilbert (June 10, 1893 – April 1970) was an American Impressionist painter, notable as one of the practitioners of the California-style. Today, he is remembered for his large, colorful canvases depicting meadows and groves of trees along the state's famed 17 Mile Drive. Gilbert was part of the group of American impressionist artists who lived and painted in the artists' colony scene in California at Carmel and Laguna Beach during the 1920s and 1930s.

== Biography ==
=== Early life ===
Born on June 10, 1893 in Mt. Vernon, Illinois, Gilbert graduated from Evanston Academy (Source: www.comenosfinearts.com, 02/20/01). He then studied at Northwestern University. During this period, he was taught by William Merritt Chase. After a stint at Annapolis, Gilbert served as an ensign in the Navy in World War I. After the war, Gilbert enjoyed "a long awaited sojourn in Concarneau, France where he decided to study painting as a future career", according to a reminiscence by fellow artist and close friend, Abel G. Warshawsky (Source: www.fada.com profile on Gilbert as remembered by Warshawsky, referenced on 12/11/2006). Later, Gilbert attended the Otis Art Institute (now known as Otis College of Art and Design) and the Chicago Art Institute.

=== The impressionist emerges ===
Gilbert spent nine years painting and exhibiting in Los Angeles. In 1929, he moved to the Monterey Peninsula and frequently held frequent one-man exhibitions at the Hotel Del Monte Art Gallery. He became widely known for his California landscapes and seascapes. Gilbert loved to paint the California Missions, especially Mission San Juan Bautista, whose bell tower, according to FADA.com, "received notoriety in the film Vertigo, directed by Alfred Hitchcock." Gilbert also painted the Santa Barbara Mission.

=== Personal life ===
Gilbert and his wife, Audine, owned and lived in a ranch home near Stockton, California. During his lifetime, Gilbert was active both professionally and personally with arts and culture associations including The Bohemian Club and the Carmel Art Association, for which he was a pioneer member.

== Gilbert's legacy ==
In a 2001 article entitled "California Impressionism" (www.eppraisals.com, 02/20/01) which discussed the resurgence of interest in this style of early 20th-century art, Victoria Shaw-Williamson (correspondent at the time for www.keen.com) wrote, "Notably, the attention garnered by big names such as Guy Rose is filtering down to other artists as well. Paintings by artists such as John Gamble, Arthur Hill Gilbert, and Mary Denil Morgan are now bringing higher than expected prices." Shaw-Williamson continues, "according to Patrick Kraft, of (a gallery in) Carmel and Los Angeles, artists that were considered second tier 10 or 15 years ago are now more sought after and their paintings are bringing stronger and stronger prices. As prices climb for the Guy Rose paintings, collectors are gravitating towards other artists in the school."

In an essay entitled, Impressionism, Post-Impressionism, and the Eucalyptus School in Southern California, art authority Nancy Dustin Wall Moure wrote that Gilbert "simplified landscape to the point of poeticism."

== Past notable exhibitions (in alphabetical order) ==
- California Palace of the Legion of Honor
- Chicago Art Institute
- National Academy of Design
- Pennsylvania Academy of Art

== Honors and awards ==
- In 1929, Gilbert was awarded the coveted Hallgarten Prize for his Monterey Oaks in an exhibition at the National Academy of Design in New York.
- In 1930, Gilbert went on to win both the Henry Ranger and the J. Francis Murphy Memorial Prizes.
- According to FADA (Fine Arts Dealers Association Online), Gilbert "was one of the very few California Impressionists to be elected into the prestigious membership of the National Academy of Design.
- Today, when at auction, many of Gilbert's works are listed in catalogs with his full name as the artist and the professional designation of "A.N.A." following.

== Museum collections ==
According to the "Ask Art" website, referenced on 1/25/02, and The Smithsonian art archive, museums that today include Arthur Hill Gilbert in their collections include:

- Brigham Young University Museum of Art
- Oakland Museum of California
- Springville Museum of Art
- Los Angeles County Museum of Art
- Monterey Museum of Art-Pacific
- California Palace of the Legion of Honor
- National Academy of Design

== Selected works (in alphabetical order) ==
- California Mission, oil on canvas, 22 by 28 in. - Sold by a gallery in Northern California in late 2000 or early 2001.
- California Sycamores, oil on canvas, approx. 32 × 40 in. - Last on display in a private home in Southern California from the 1950s until 1988.
- Cloudy Day on The Seine, 1927, oil on canvas, 32 × 40 in. - Paul Bagley Collection, as per Gerdts and South in California Impressionism page 244 (plate 238).
- The Cove, Pt. Lobos, c. 1935, oil on canvas, 25 × 30 in.
- Duneland, Monterey, oil on canvas, 40 × 50 in. - Sold by Altadena-based John Moran Auctioneers, at The Pasadena Convention Center on June 20, 2006. Price paid by the buyer was a 2nd-highest record for this artist of $57,500.(Source: www.News-Antique.com as per JSLA Media press release, reference: Lot #82, presale estimate of $ 20K to $30K).
- Green Hills, oil on canvas, 20 × 23 1/4 in. - Sold for $5,000 at auction, December 2006, Butterfield and Butterfield (Source: www.bohnhams.com, Sale 14048, lot 193).
- Green Hills at Seaside, oil on canvas, 12 × 16 in. - Sold for $6,462.50 at auction, June 8, 2006, Butterfield and Butterfield (Source: www.bohnhams.com, Sale 7544D, lot 4240). - "Provenance: Property from the Baird collection, sold to benefit the Monterey Museum of Art's Exhibition program. Note: There is a landscape study painted on the reverse." Bonhams' catalogue, p. 145.
- Glimpse of Hollywood Hills, oil on canvas on panel, 12 × 14 in. - In the permanent collection at the Brigham Young University Museum of Art in Utah.
- Monterey Bay, c. 1930, oil on canvasboard, 9 × 12 in. Sold by a gallery in Northern California in late 2000 or early 2001.(Source: www.fada.com/trotter4.html)
- Mt. Doud, Big Sur, oil on canvas, 40 × 50 in. - Also sold by Altadena-based John Moran Auctioneers, at The Pasadena Convention Center on June 20, 2006. The buyer, Trotter Galleries of Carmel, paid a record $97,975. Note: A smaller (25" × 30") painting by the artist with the same title, though varying in color, was sold by Bonhams & Butterfields in August 2005 for a reported $29,375.(Source: www.News-Antique.com as per JSLA Media press release, reference: Lot #48, presale estimate of $ 25K to $30K).
- A Summer Moon, oil on canvas, 25 × 30 in. - Last on display at a gallery in California in July 2005. (Source: www.knathangallery.com)
- Summer Path, oil on canvas on board, 9 × 12 in. - Auctioned at Butterfield and Butterfield in May 2007 with a bid estimate of $3,000 to $5,000.(Source: www.bohnhams.com, Sale 14796, lot 735).
- Tall Trees, oil on canvas, 24 × 30 in. - Last on display at a gallery in Southern California in February 2001. (Source: www.binggallery.com)
- View of 17 Mile Drive, oil on canvas, 25 × 30 in. - Last on display at a gallery in Southern California in July 2005. (Source: www.knathangallery.com)
