= Silas Dustin =

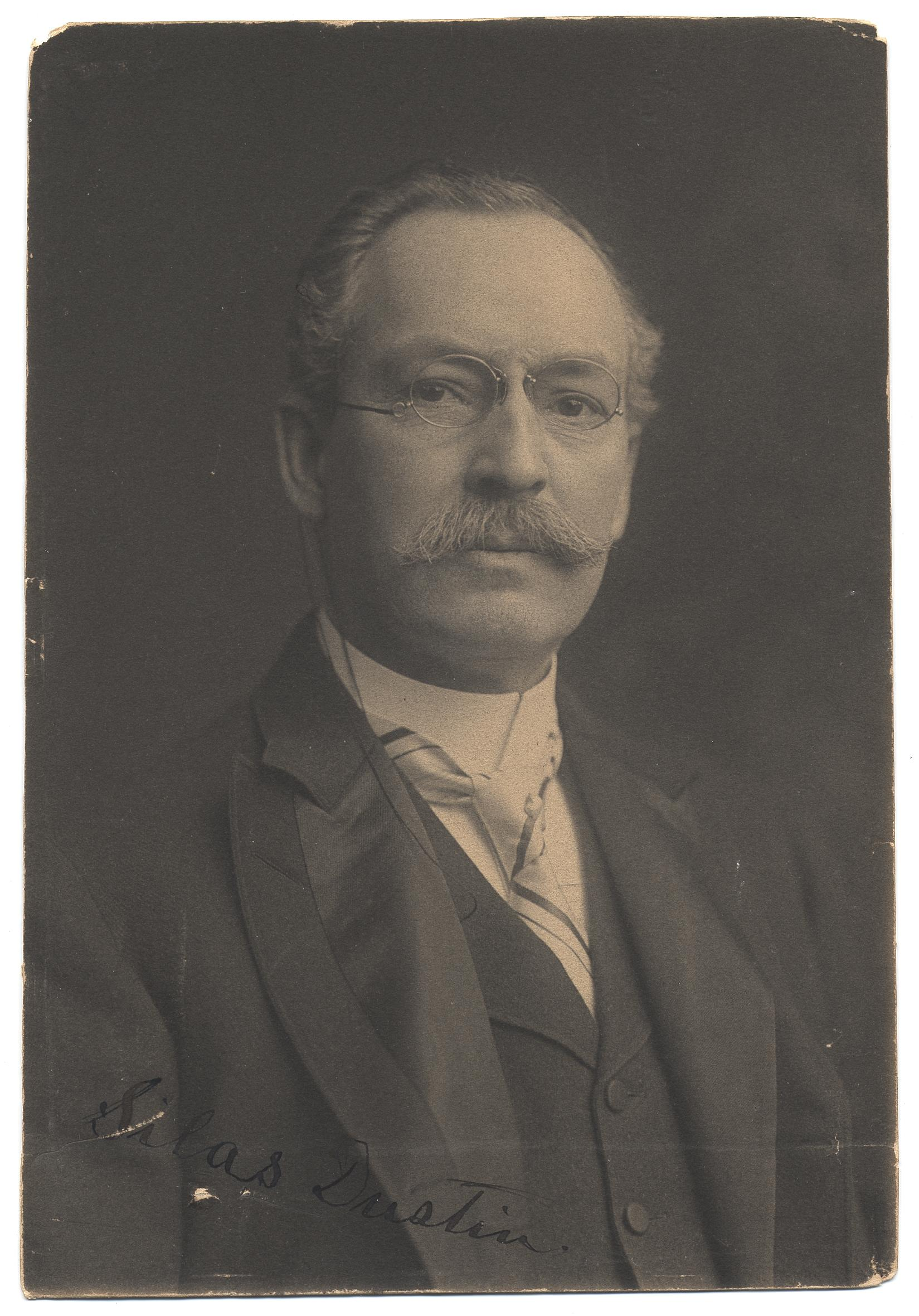
- Born: 1855; Richmond, Ohio
- Died: 1940 (aged 84–85)
- Known for: Curator and artist

Silas Dustin (1855 – 1940) was an artist, art dealer and curator of the National Academy of Design in New York

== Biography ==
Dustin was born in Richmond, Ohio although he is known as a California painter. He studied under William Merritt Chase in New York City. Dustin became the curator of the National Academy of Design in New York before leading the Biltmore Salon. Dustin died in 1940.
