= William Merritt Chase =

American painter (1849–1916)

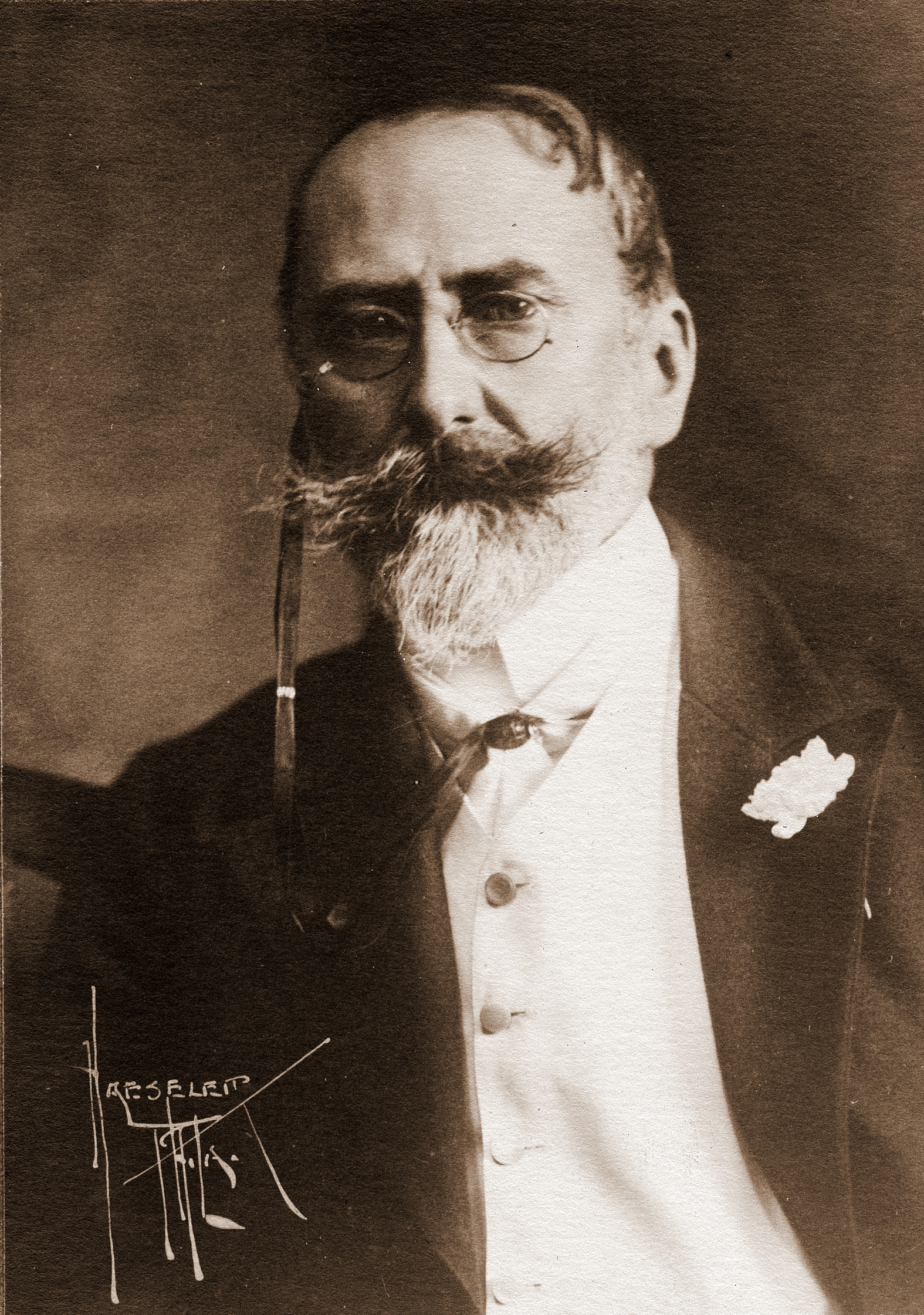
- Chase in 1900
- Born: November 1, 1849; Nineveh, Indiana, US
- Died: October 25, 1916 (aged 66); New York City, US
- Education: National Academy of Design; Academy of Fine Arts, Munich,
- Known for: Portrait painting; landscape art
- Movement: Impressionism
- Awards: Philadelphia Centennial Exposition medal

William Merritt Chase (November 1, 1849 – October 25, 1916) was an American painter, known as an exponent of Impressionism and as a teacher. He is also responsible for establishing the Chase School, which later became the Parsons School of Design.

== Early life and training ==
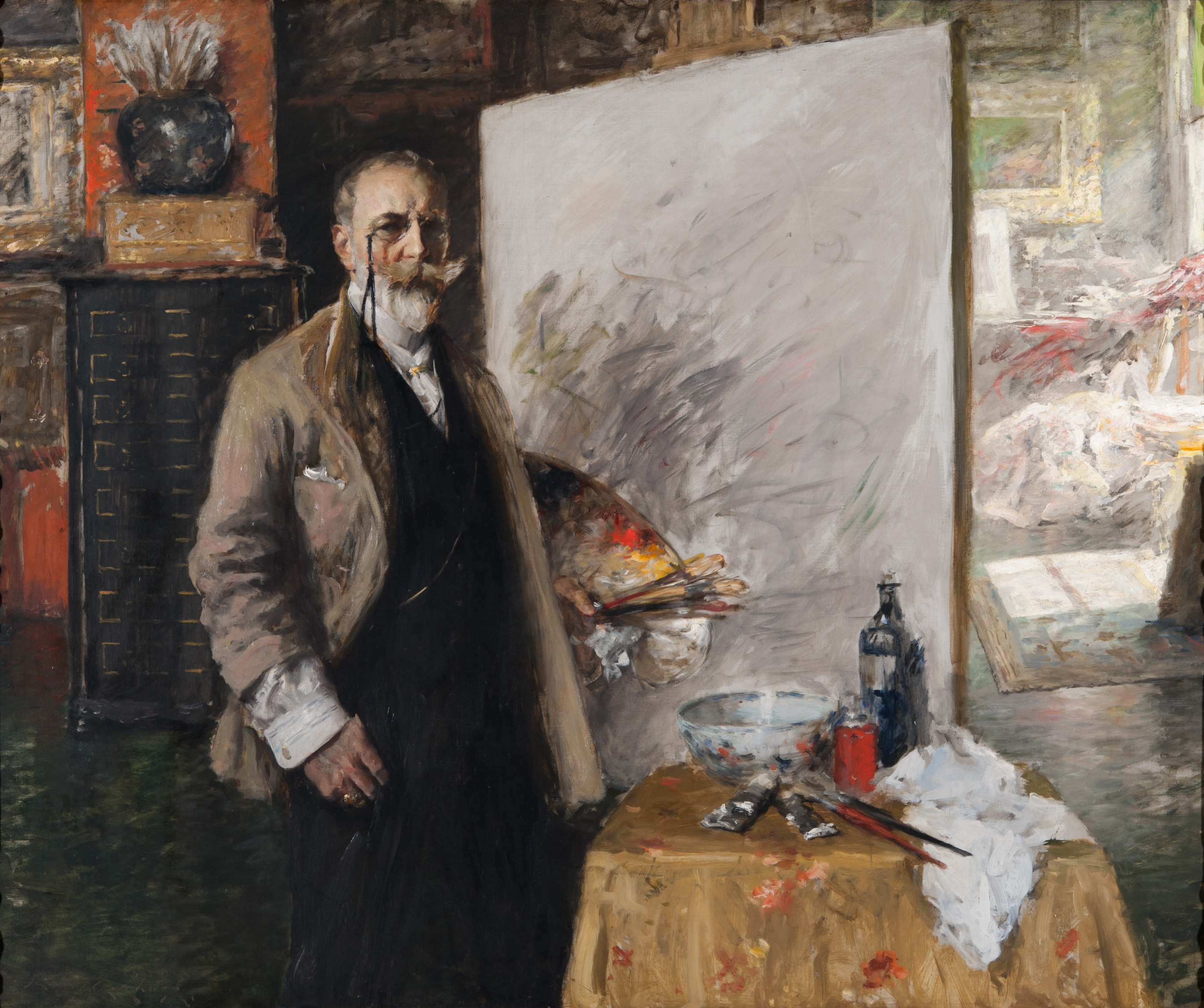
Self portrait, 1915–16, oil on canvas, Richmond Art Museum

William Merritt Chase was born on November 1, 1849, in Williamsburg (now Nineveh), Indiana, to the family of Sarah Swain and David H. Chase, a local businessman. Chase's father moved the family to Indianapolis in 1861, and employed his son as a salesman in the family business. Chase showed an early interest in art, and studied under local, self-taught artists Barton S. Hays and Jacob Cox.

At the age of 19, he decided to become a sailor and travelled with his friend to Annapolis where he was commissioned to a merchant ship. After a brief three-month stint in the Navy, Chase understood that it was not for him and his teachers urged him to travel to New York to further his artistic training. He arrived in New York in 1869, met and studied with Joseph Oriel Eaton for a short time, then enrolled in the National Academy of Design under Lemuel Wilmarth, a student of the famous French artist Jean-Léon Gérôme.

In 1870, declining family fortunes forced Chase to leave New York for St. Louis, Missouri, where his family was then based. While he worked to help support his family he became active in the St. Louis art community, winning prizes for his paintings at a local exhibition. He also exhibited his first painting at the National Academy in 1871. Chase's talent elicited the interest of wealthy St. Louis collectors who arranged for him to visit Europe for two years, in exchange for paintings and Chase's help in securing European art for their collections.

In Europe, Chase settled at the Academy of Fine Arts, Munich, a long-standing center of art training that was attracting increasing numbers of Americans and attracted Chase because it had fewer distractions than Paris. He studied under Alexander von Wagner and Karl von Piloty, and befriended American artists Walter Shirlaw, Frank Duveneck, and J(oseph) Frank Currier.

In Munich, Chase employed his rapidly burgeoning talent most often in figurative works that he painted in the loosely brushed style popular with his instructors. In January 1876, one of these figural works, a portrait titled "Keying Up" – The Court Jester (now in the collection of the Pennsylvania Academy of the Fine Arts) was exhibited at the Boston Art Club; later that year it was exhibited and won a medal at the Philadelphia Centennial Exposition, and this success gained Chase his first fame.

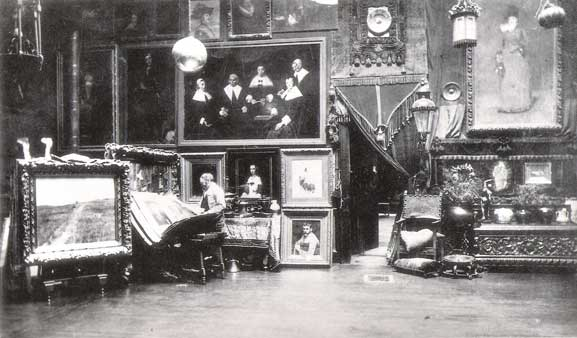
Photo by Noel Rowe of William Merritt Chase in his studio on Tenth Street New York which he held from 1875 to 1895

Chase traveled to Venice, Italy in 1877 with Duveneck and John Henry Twachtman before returning to the United States in the summer of 1878, a highly skilled artist representing the new wave of European-educated American talent. Home in America, he exhibited his painting Ready for the Ride (collection of the Union League Club) with the newly formed Society of American Artists in 1878. He also opened a studio in New York in the Tenth Street Studio Building, home to many of the important painters of the day. He was a member of the Tilers, a group of artists and authors, among whom were some of his notable friends: Winslow Homer, Arthur Quartley and Augustus Saint Gaudens.

In 1881, friend and artist William Preston Phelps travelled back to Europe to team up with Chase to go on a working tour of Italy, Venice, Capri then back to Germany.

== Chase's roles: father, artist, teacher ==
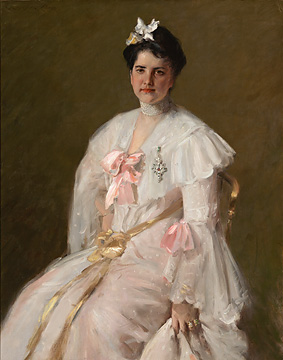
Mrs. Chase in Pink, Figge Art Museum

Chase maintained a multifaceted public and private identity, including his roles as an artist, family man, and educator. Chase married Alice Gerson on February 8, 1887 and together they raised eight children during Chase's most energetic artistic period. His eldest daughters, Alice Dieudonnee Chase and Dorothy Bremond Chase, often modeled for their father.

In New York City, however, Chase became known for his flamboyance, especially in his dress, his manners, and most of all in his studio. At Tenth Street, Chase had moved into Albert Bierstadt's old studio and had decorated it as an extension of his own art. Chase filled the studio with lavish furniture, decorative objects, stuffed birds, oriental carpets, and exotic musical instruments. Chase's studio attracted numerous artists and cultural figures in New York City during the late 19th century. By 1895, the cost of maintaining the studio, in addition to his other residences, forced Chase to close it and auction the contents.

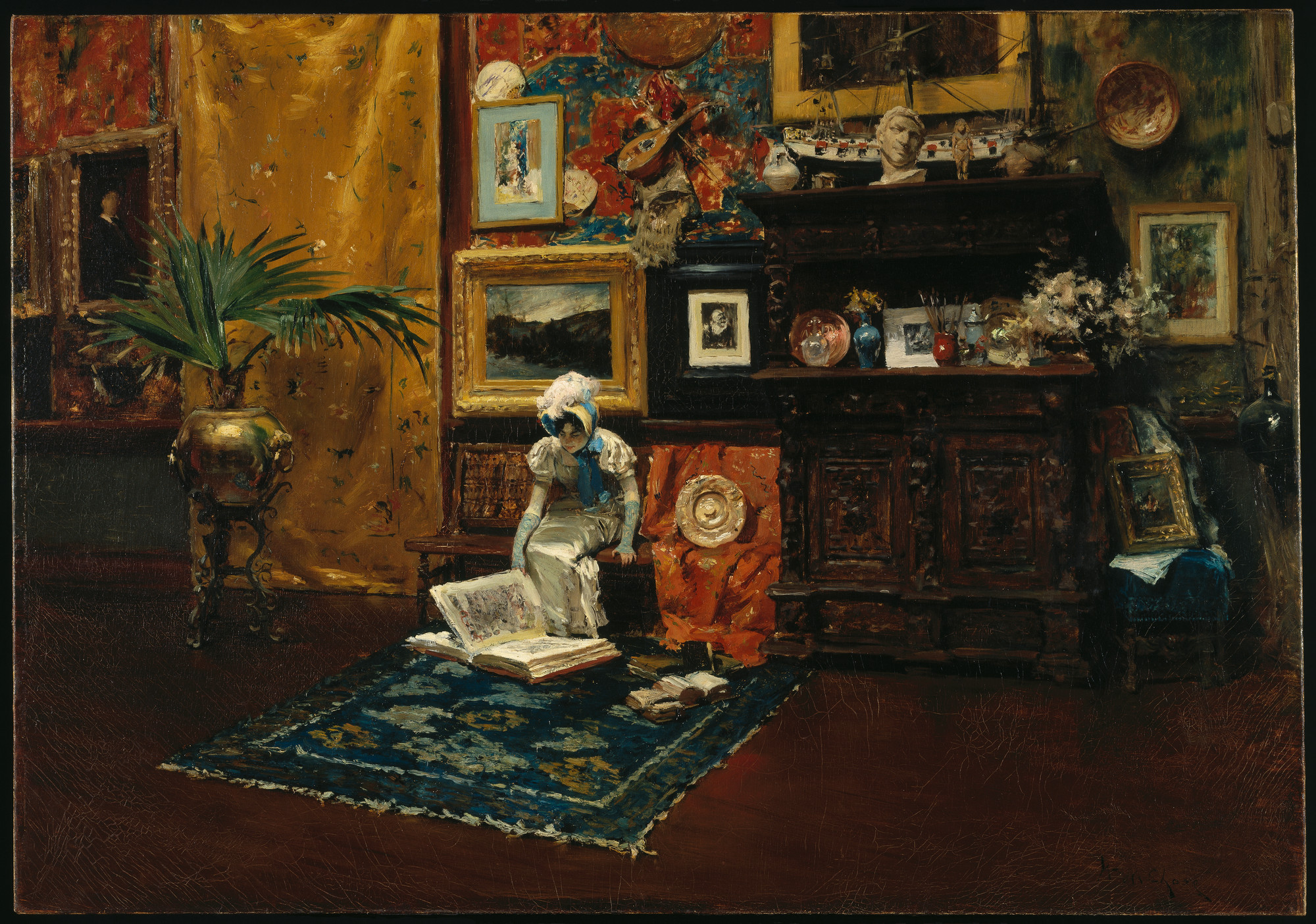
Studio Interior, c. 1882, Brooklyn Museum

In addition to his painting, Chase expanded his career to include art instruction. Initially he took on private pupils, among his first being Dora Wheeler, a student from 1879 to 1881 who became a professional artist and a lifelong friend. Dora's mother Candace Wheeler wrote in her memoirs of Chase's contagious enthusiasm, "the most generous of teachers, not only giving exhaustively of his stored knowledge of how to do things, but fostering as well the will to do it. Later, somewhat against his will, he was persuaded to take charge of an art-school at Shinnecock Hills, Long Island . . . "

At the instigation of Mrs. William Hoyt, Chase opened the Shinnecock Hills Summer School of Art on eastern Long Island, New York in 1891. He taught there until 1902. Chase adopted the plein air method of painting, and often taught his students in outdoor classes. He also opened the Chase School of Art in 1896, which became the New York School of Art two years later with Chase staying on as instructor until 1907. Chase taught at the Pennsylvania Academy of the Fine Arts from 1896 to 1909; the Art Students League from 1878 to 1896 and again from 1907 to 1911; and the Brooklyn Art Association in 1887 and from 1891 to 1896. Along with Robert Henri, who became a rival instructor, Chase was a prominent teacher whose influence on American artists at the turn of the 20th century was widely recognized.

In addition to his instruction of East Coast artists like George Bellows, Louise Upton Brumback, Howard Chandler Christy, Kate Freeman Clark, Jay Hall Connaway, Mariette Leslie Cotton, Charles Demuth, Silas Dustin, Lydia Field Emmet, George Pearse Ennis, Rosalie Lorraine Gill, Marsden Hartley, Annie Traquair Lang, John Marin, M. Jean McLane, Frances Miller Mumaugh, Georgia O'Keeffe, Leopold Seyffert, Elizabeth Sparhawk-Jones, Joseph Stella, Lillian Elvira Moore Abbot, and Edward Charles Volkert, he had an important role in influencing California art at the turn of the century, especially in interactions with Arthur Frank Mathews, Xavier Martinez, Percy Gray and Shirley Williamson. He also had an important role in influencing Texas Impressionism, and taught painters Julian Onderdonk and Alice Schille. He also taught Midwestern artists, Sara Shewell Hayden and Grace Ravlin.

== European summer tours ==
After stopping his work at Shinnecock Hills, Chase began taking groups of students overseas in the summer months to tour the important European art centers. In 1903, Chase and his students visited Haarlem in the Netherlands, where Chase was inspired by a schutterstuk by Frans Hals. He made a self-portrait of himself in the role of one of Hals' schutters, choosing his look-alike Johan Claesz Loo featured in The Officers of the St Adrian Militia Company in 1633.

== Style and subject matter ==
Chase worked in all media. He was most fluent in oil painting and pastel, but also created watercolor paintings and etchings. S.G.W. Benjamin said of his style in a contemporary review:

A noble sense of color is perceptible in all his works, whether in the subtle elusive tints of flesh, or in the powerful rendering of a mass of scarlet, as in his notable painting of the "Court Jester". In the painting of a portrait he endeavors, sometimes very successfully, to seize character, although occasionally rather too impressionist in style.

=== Portrait painting ===
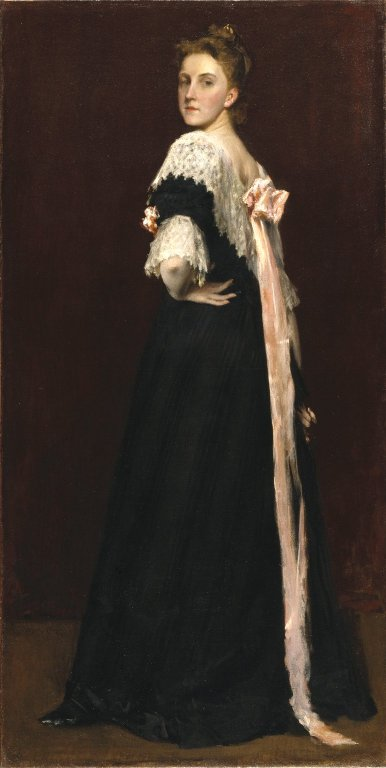
Lydia Field Emmet, 1892. Brooklyn Museum.

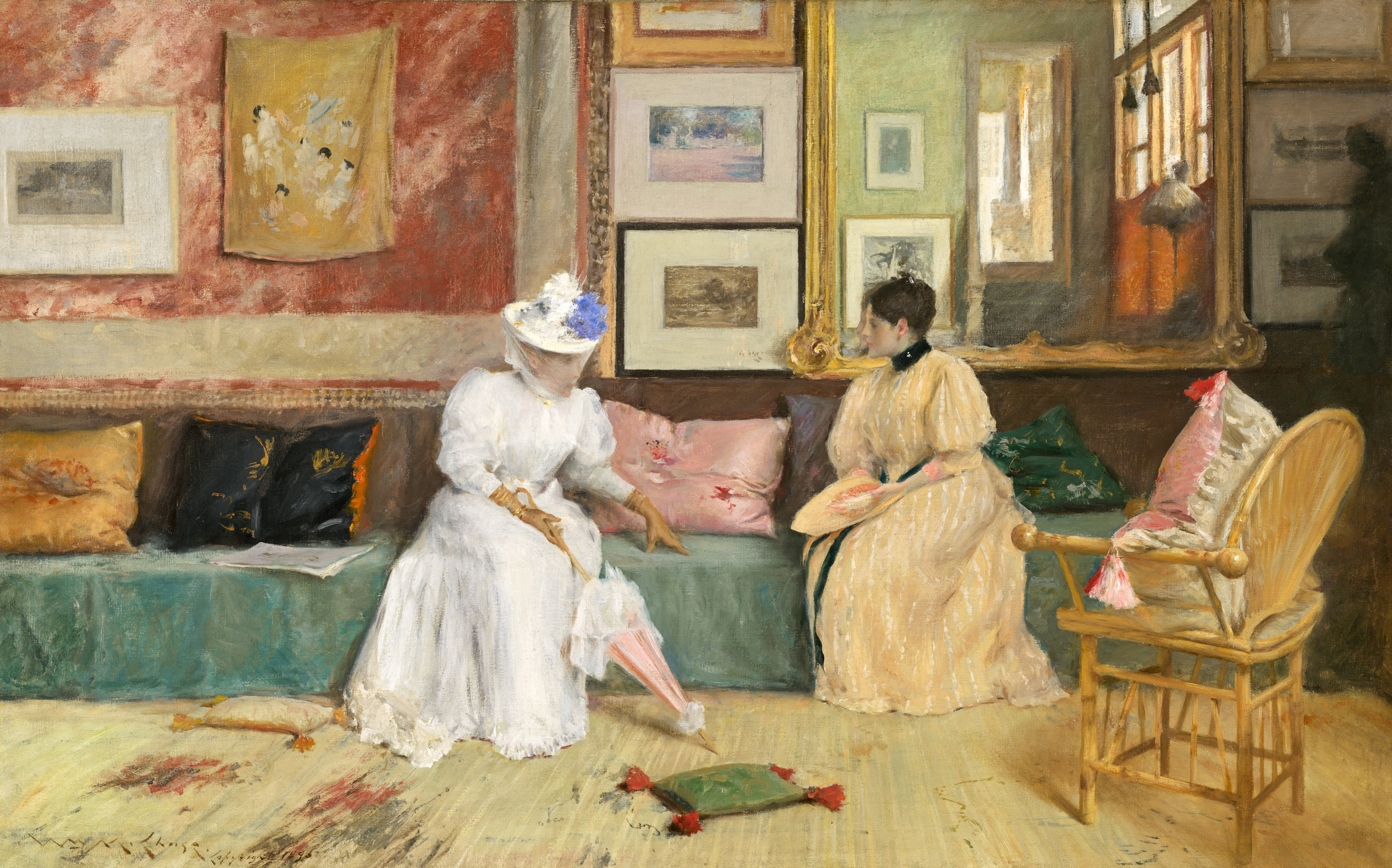
A Friendly Call, 1895. National Gallery of Art

He is perhaps best known for his portraits, and his sitters including some of the most important men and women of his time. His portrait of painter Lydia Field Emmet in 1892 depicts Emmet in a pose typically reserved for men in old masters' paintings. Emmet's hand is on her hip and she looks over her shoulder at the audience.

Chase also frequently painted his wife Alice and their children, sometimes in individual portraits, and other times in scenes of domestic tranquility: at breakfast in their backyard, or relaxing at their summer home on Long Island, the children playing on the floor or among the sand dunes of Shinnecock. In an 1895 painting titled A Friendly Call, his wife is depicted wearing a yellow dress and entertaining a caller dressed in white.

=== Landscapes ===
In addition to painting portraits and full-length figurative works, Chase began painting landscapes in earnest in the late 1880s. His interest in landscape art may have been spawned by the landmark New York exhibit of French impressionist works from Parisian dealer Durand-Ruel in 1886.Chase gained recognition for two prominent series of landscape subjects, both painted in an impressionist manner. The first was his scenes of Prospect and Central Parks in New York; the second were his summer landscapes at Shinnecock. Chase usually featured people prominently in his landscapes. Often he depicted woman and children in leisurely poses, relaxing on a park bench, on the beach, or lying in the summer grass at Shinnecock. Art historians have described the Shinnecock works as significant examples of American Impressionism.

In 1903, Chase rented the Villa La Meridiana near Careggi, Florence, to which he would return to paint each summer. Later he bought the Villa Silli, south of the city.

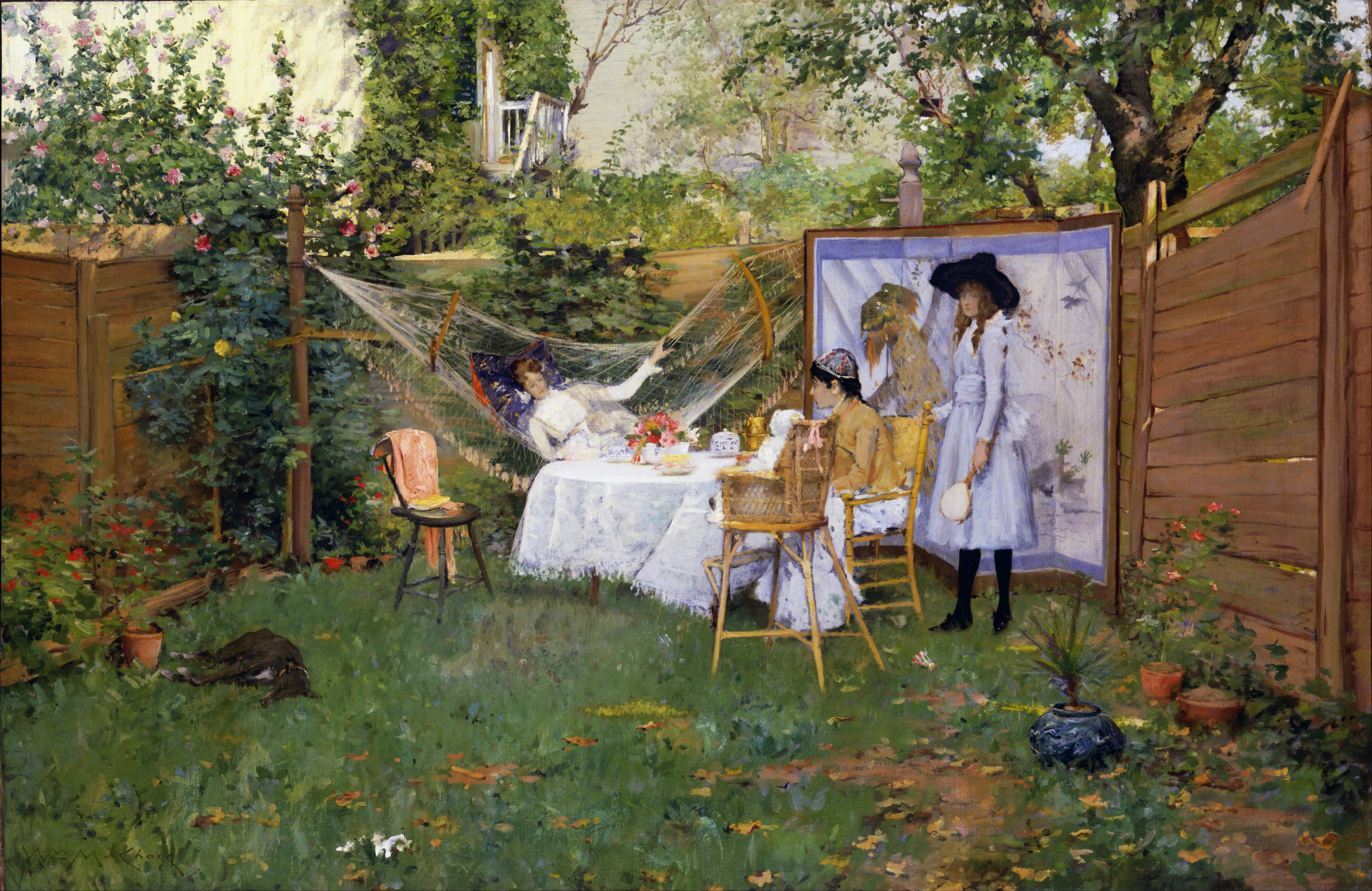
Open Air Breakfast, 1888

=== Still lifes ===
Chase continued to paint still lifes throughout his career as he had done since his student days. Decorative objects filled his studios and homes, and his interior figurative scenes frequently included still life images. He was particularly adept at capturing the effect of light on metallic surfaces such as copper bowls and pitchers. Perhaps Chase's most famous still life subject was dead fish, which he liked to paint against dark backgrounds, limp on a plate as though fresh from a fishmonger's stall. He was known for purchasing the dead fish at the market, painting them quickly, and then returning them before they spoiled.

== Honors and late career ==
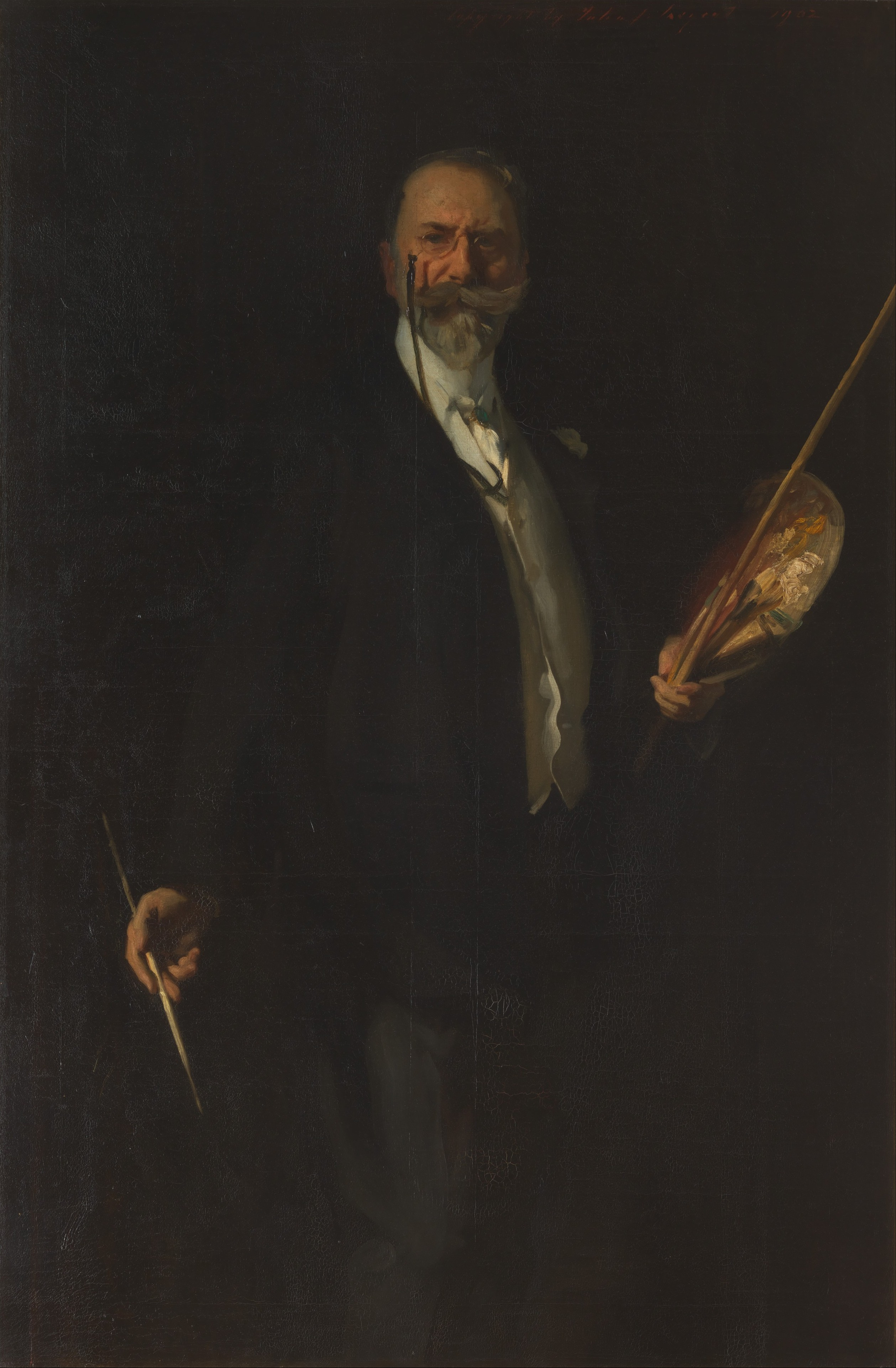
Portrait of Chase by John Singer Sargent (1902) at the Metropolitan Museum of Art

Chase won many honors at home and abroad, was a member of the National Academy of Design, New York, and from 1885 to 1895 was president of the Society of American Artists. He became a member of the Ten American Painters after John Henry Twachtman died.

Chase's creativity declined in his later years, especially as modern art took hold in America, but he continued to paint and teach into the 1910s. During this period Chase taught such up and coming young artists as Wilhelmina Weber Furlong, Arthur Hill Gilbert, and Edward Hopper.

At Carmel-by-the-Sea from July through September 1914 Chase taught his last summer class, his largest with over one hundred pupils and his most problematic, at the Carmel Arts and Crafts Club's Summer School Of Art. His former student, Jennie V. Cannon, in conjunction with Chase's business manager C. P. Townsley and Carmel's co-founder James Franklin Devendorf, persuaded the esteemed painter to visit the Pacific Coast with promises of generous financial returns.

Suffering from declining health (cirrhosis of the liver), Chase took the opportunity shortly after his arrival to meet with the directors of San Francisco's forthcoming Panama–Pacific International Exposition to secure his own exhibition gallery, which he had been denied earlier. Several of Chase's students at Carmel expressed admiration for his teaching, documenting his lectures and techniques. Chase found the art colony at Carmel too confining socially and moved his residence to the nearby luxury Hotel Del Monte in Monterey, where he negotiated several important portrait commissions. In mid-August one of his students, Helena Wood Smith, was brutally murdered by her Japanese lover, which caused the cancellation of several classes, near violent hysteria in the art colony, and the early departure of some of his students. Chase continued with his regular teaching schedule, held meetings with important regional artists, such as William Ritschel, painted several local scenes, and experimented with monotypes.

Chase died on October 25, 1916, at his home in New York City, an esteemed elder of the American art world. He was interred in Green-Wood Cemetery, Brooklyn, New York.

Today his works are in most major museums in the United States. His home and studio at Shinnecock Hills, New York, was added to the National Register of Historic Places in 1983 as the William Merritt Chase Homestead.

== Gallery ==
Portrait of a Man (1875), oil on canvas, 24 x 19 in. (61 x 48.3 cm), Clark Art Institute

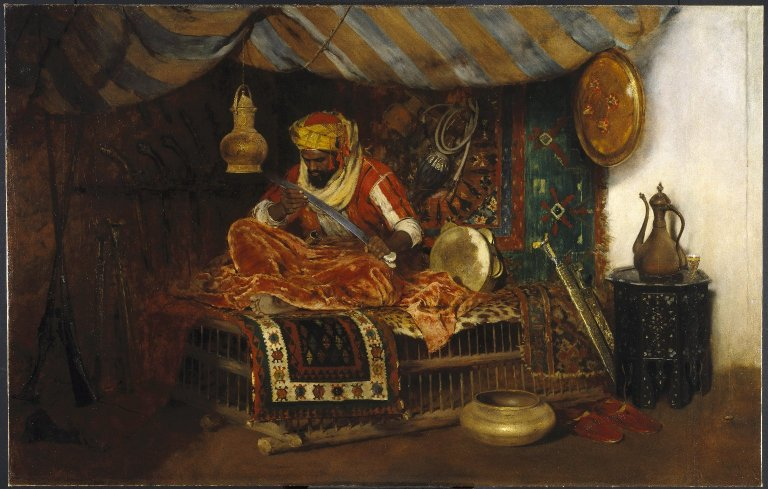
The Moorish Warrior, c. 1878. Brooklyn Museum.

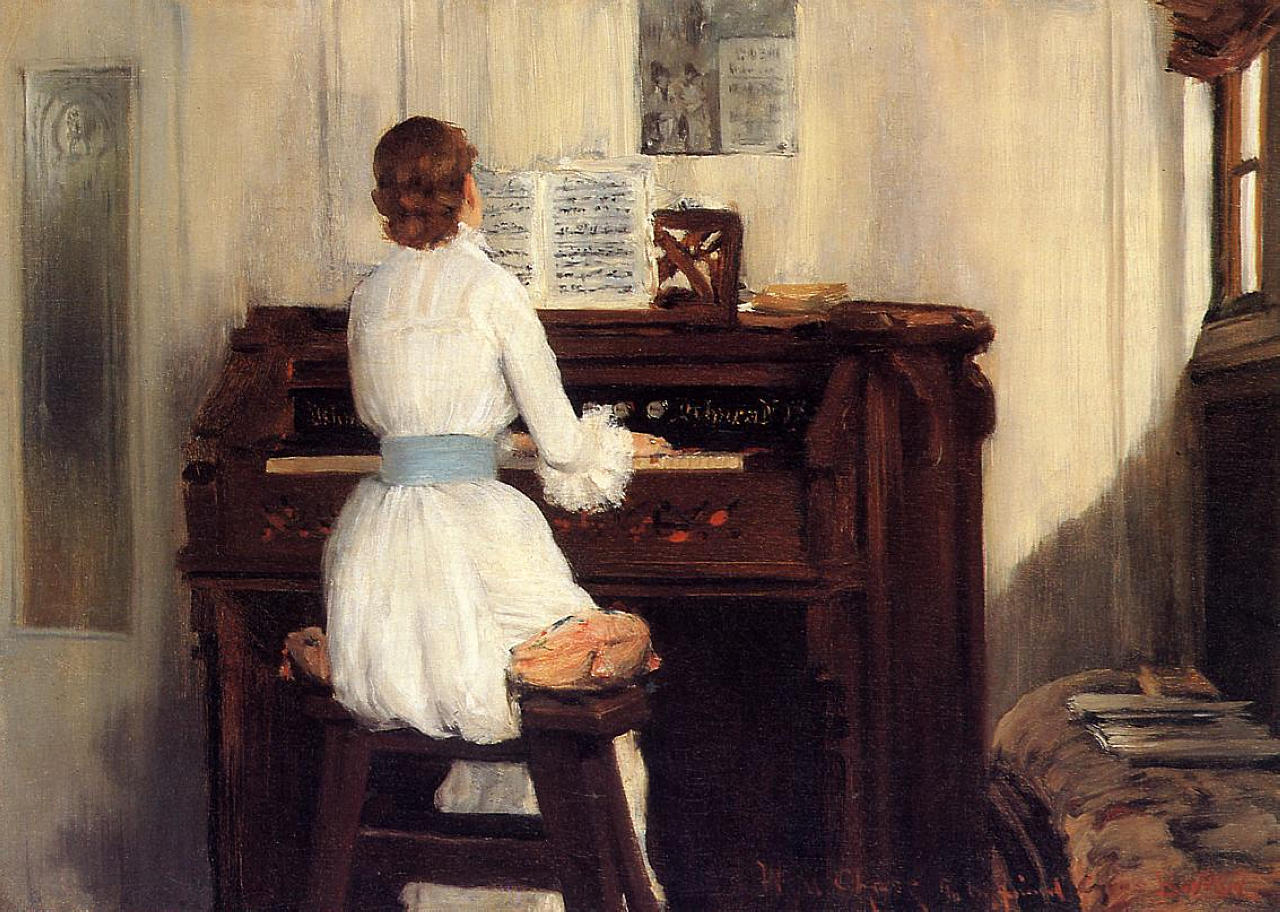
Mrs Chase Playing the Piano, 1883

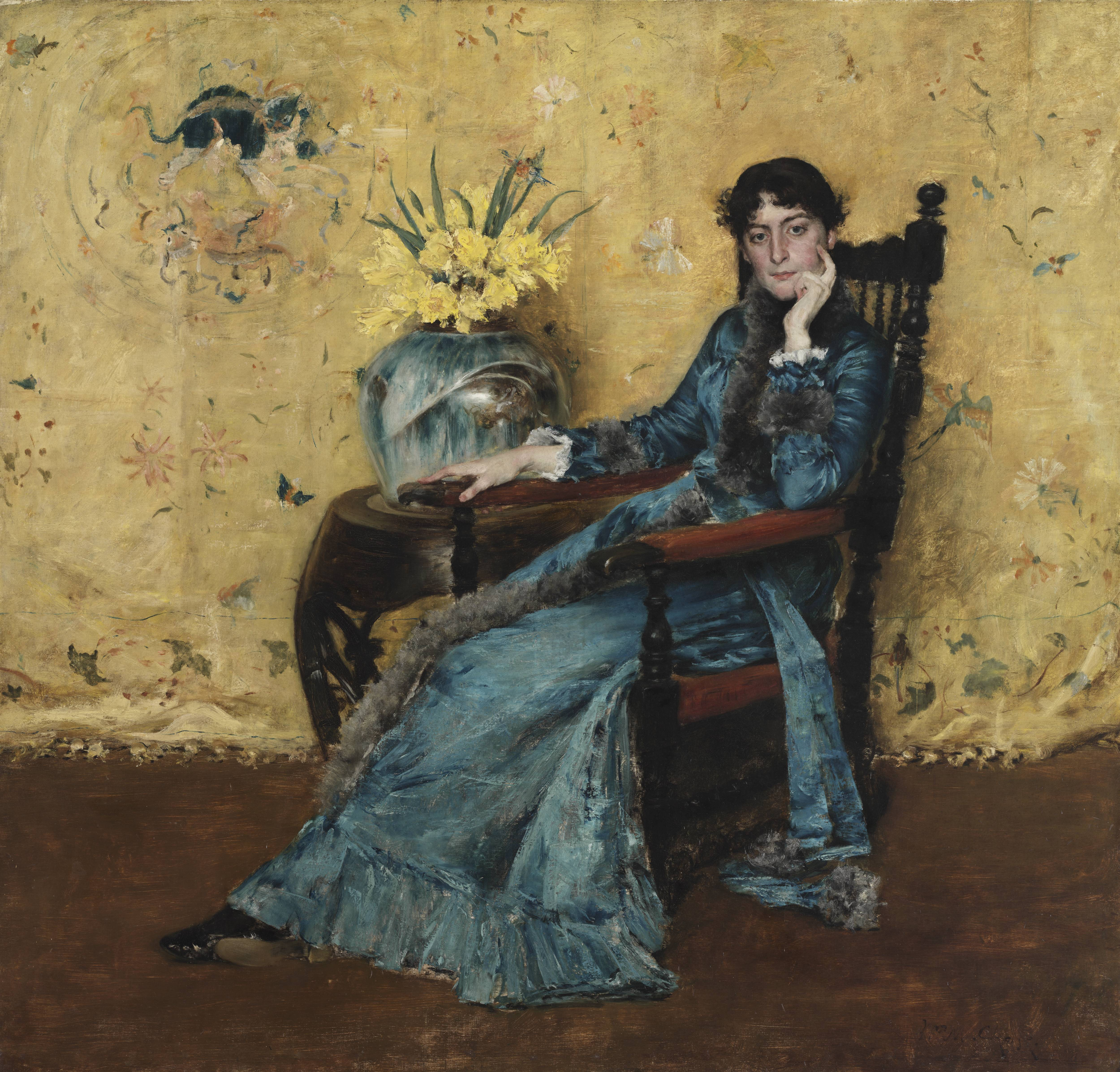
Portrait of Miss Dora Wheeler, 1883

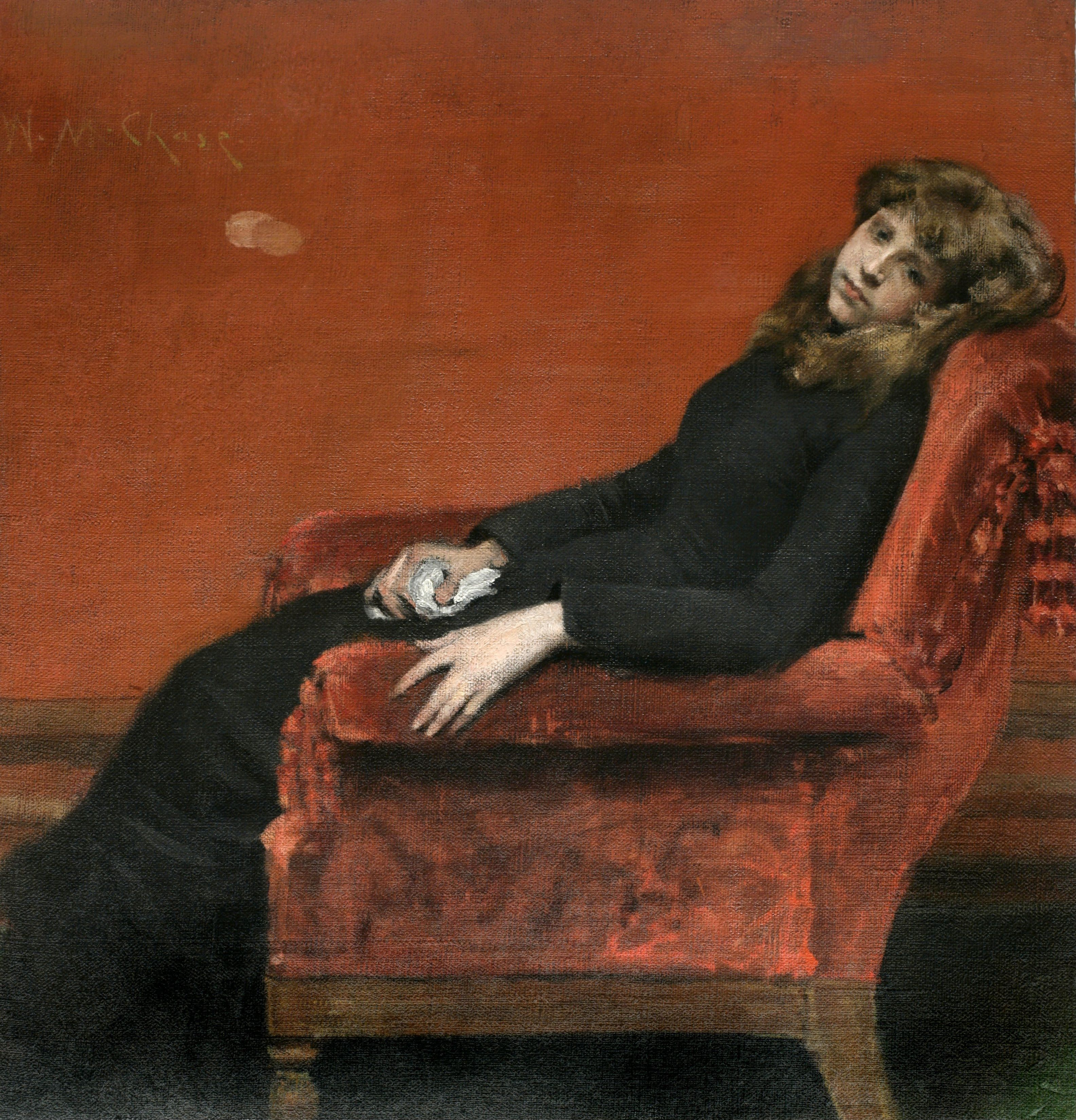
The Young Orphan or At Her Ease, 1884, National Academy of Design, New York

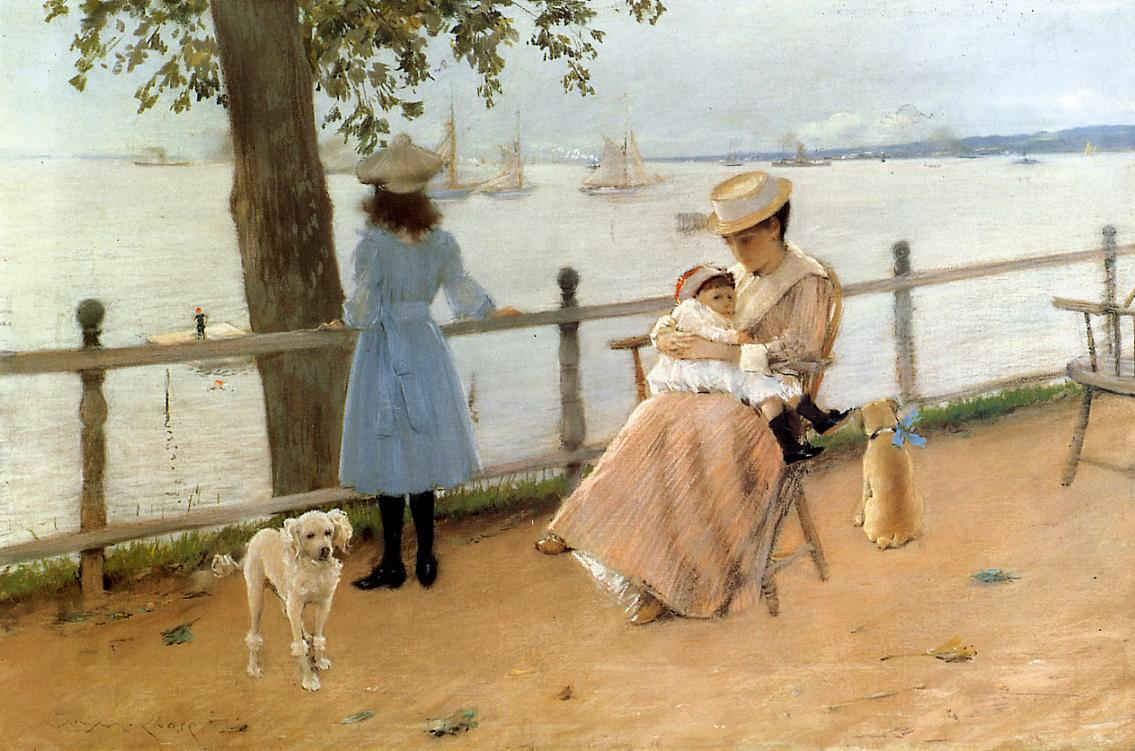
Afternoon by the Sea (Gravesend Bay), c. 1888

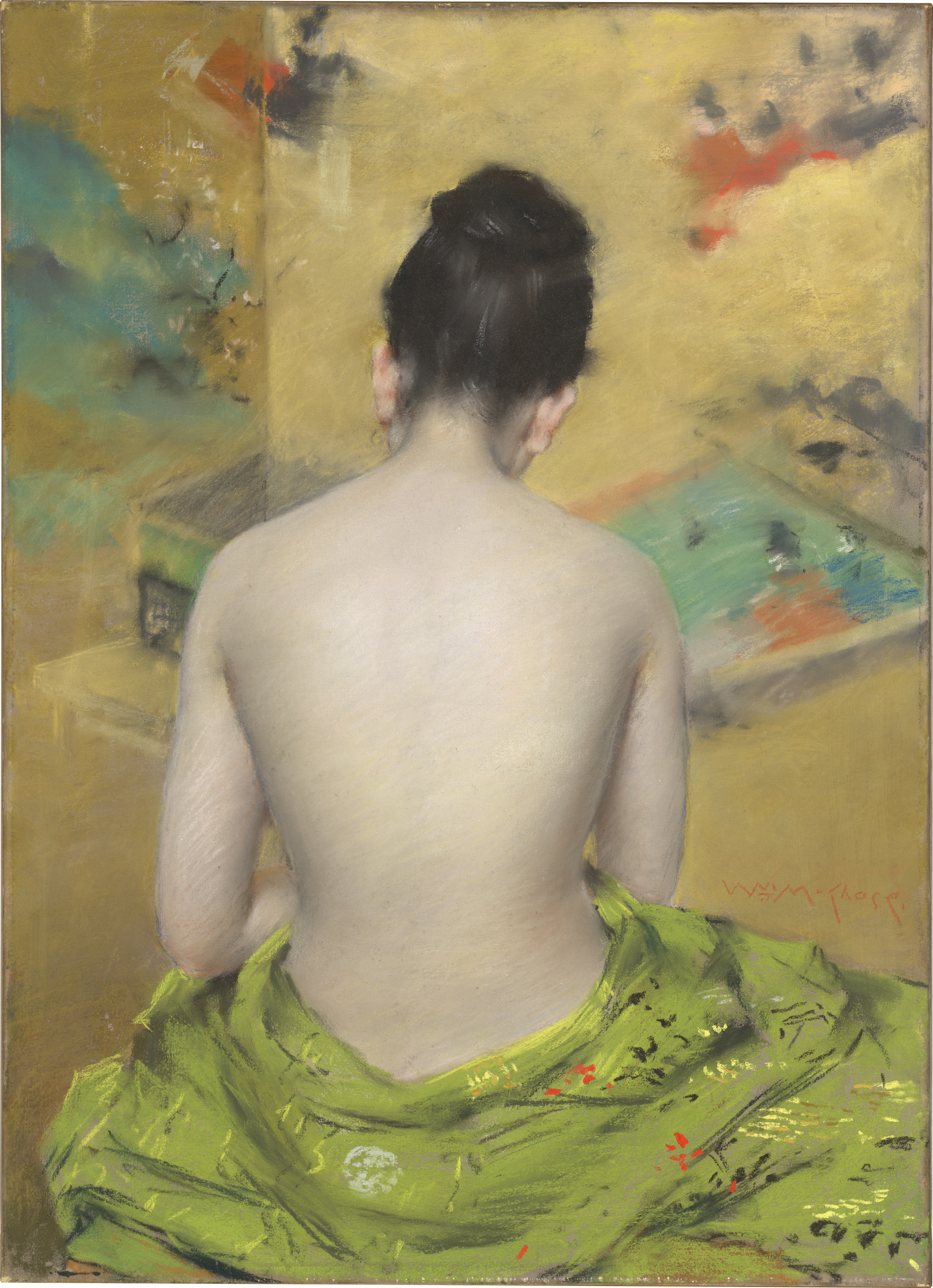
Study of Flesh Color and Gold, 1888, National Gallery of Art

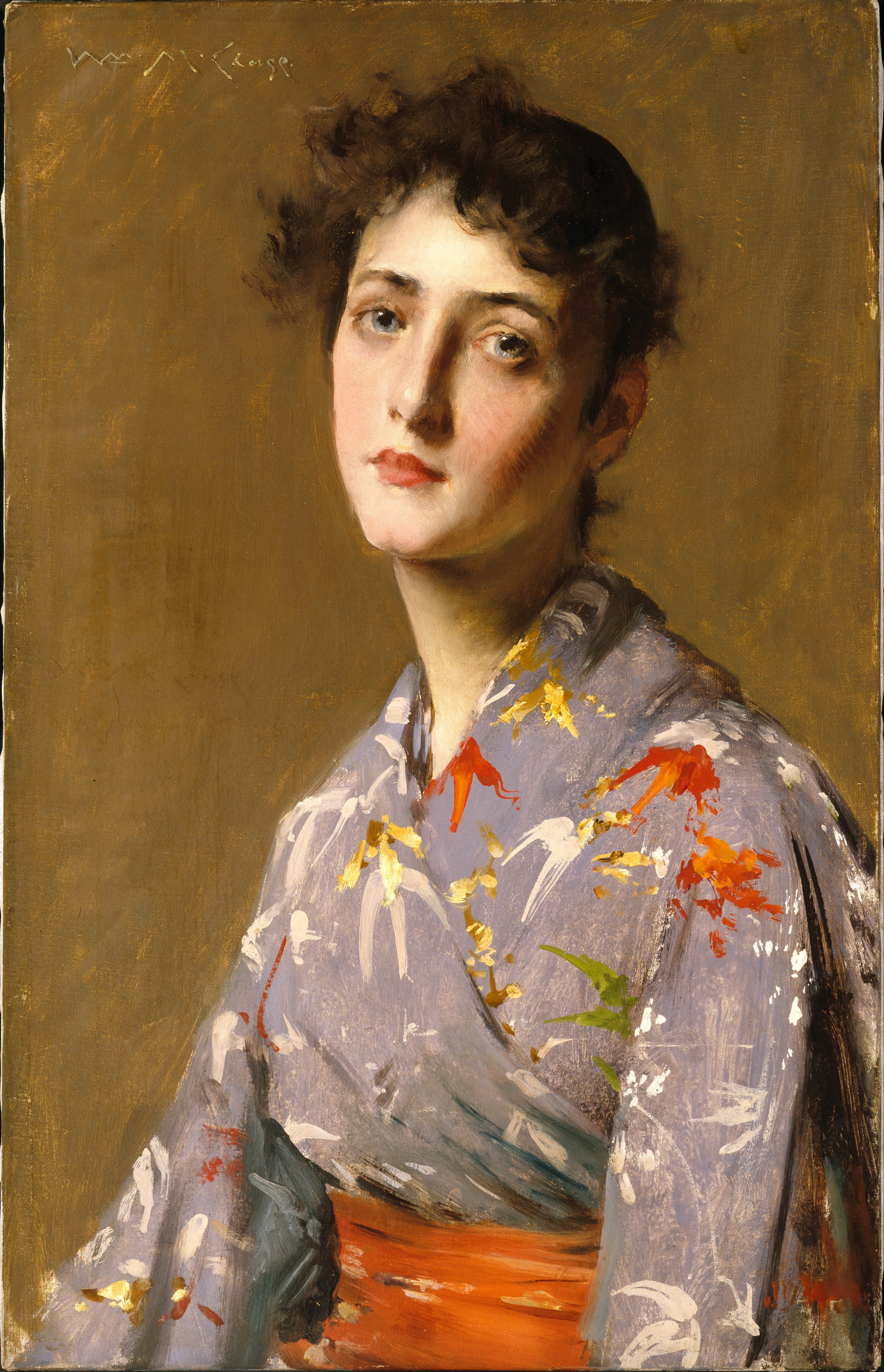
Girl in a Japanese Costume, c. 1890. Brooklyn Museum

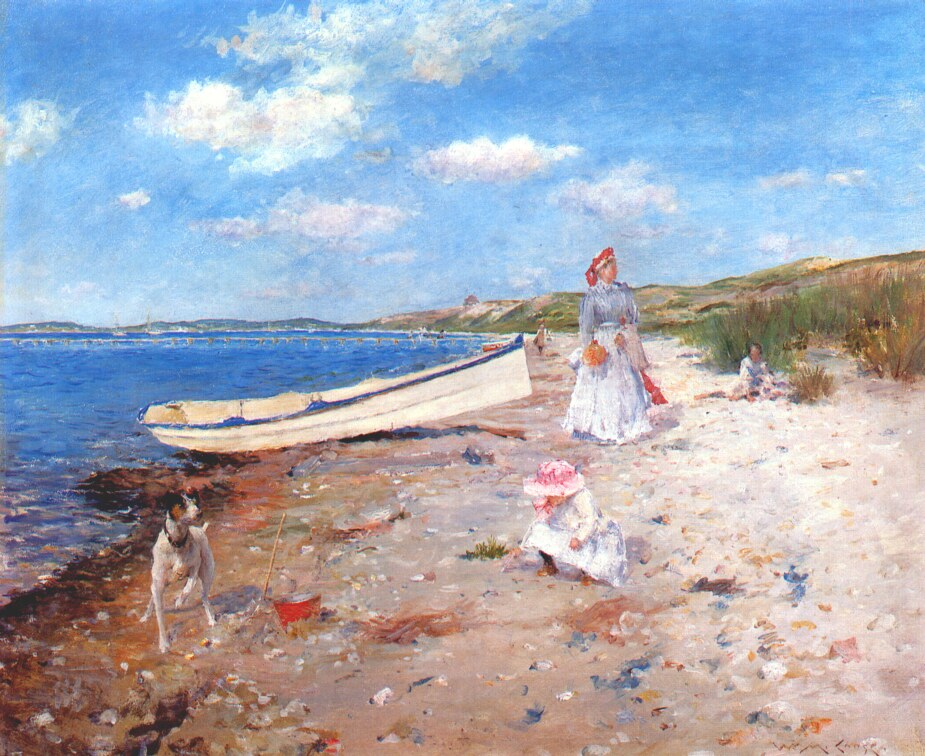
A Sunny Day at Shinnecock Bay, c. 1892

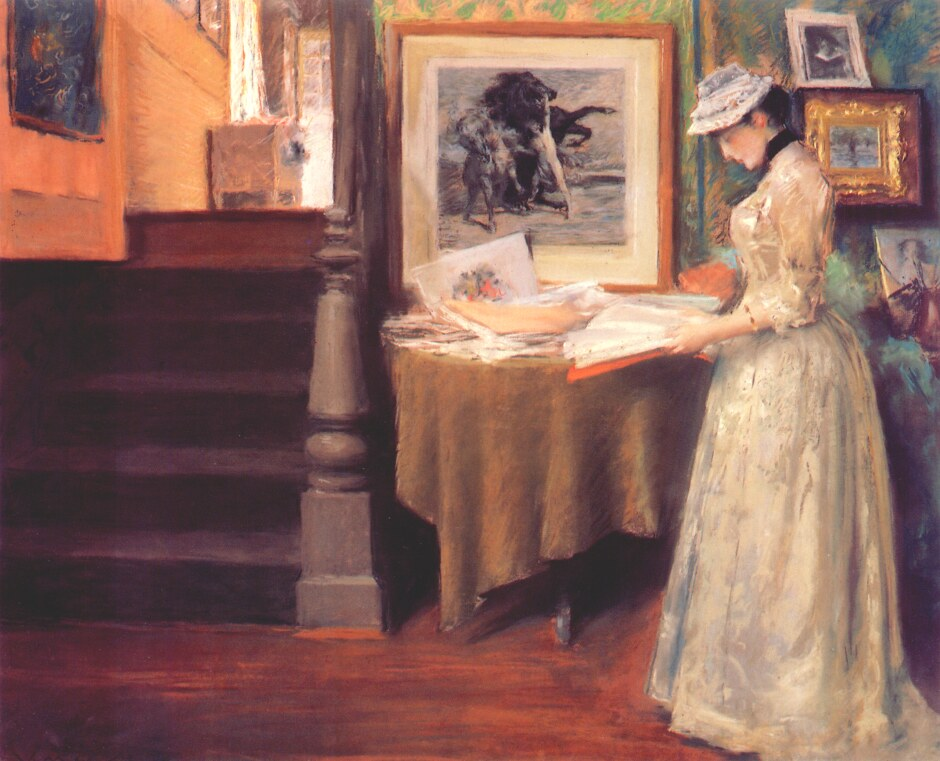
In The Studio, c. 1892–3

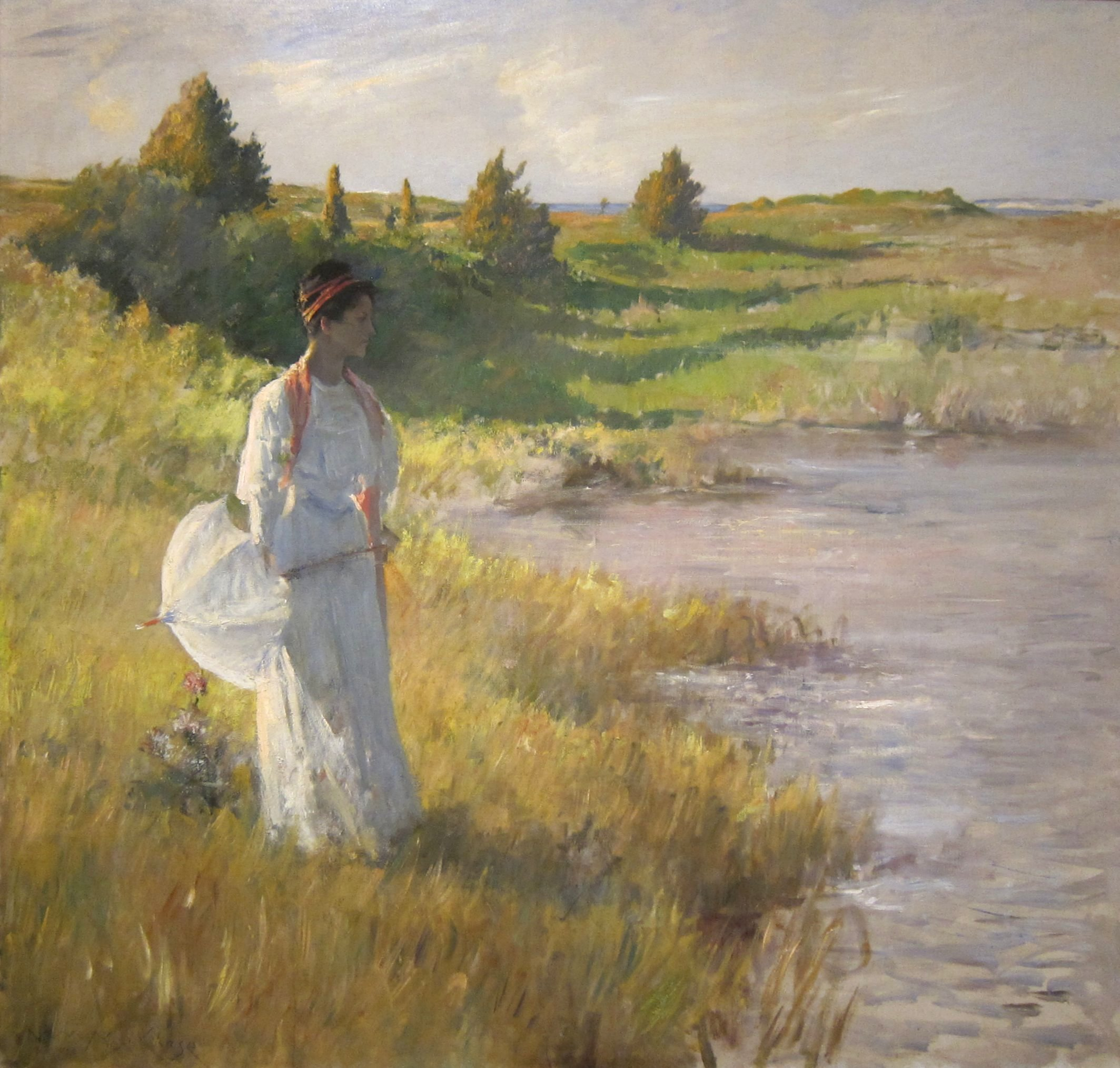
An Afternoon Stroll, c. 1895 San Diego Museum of Art

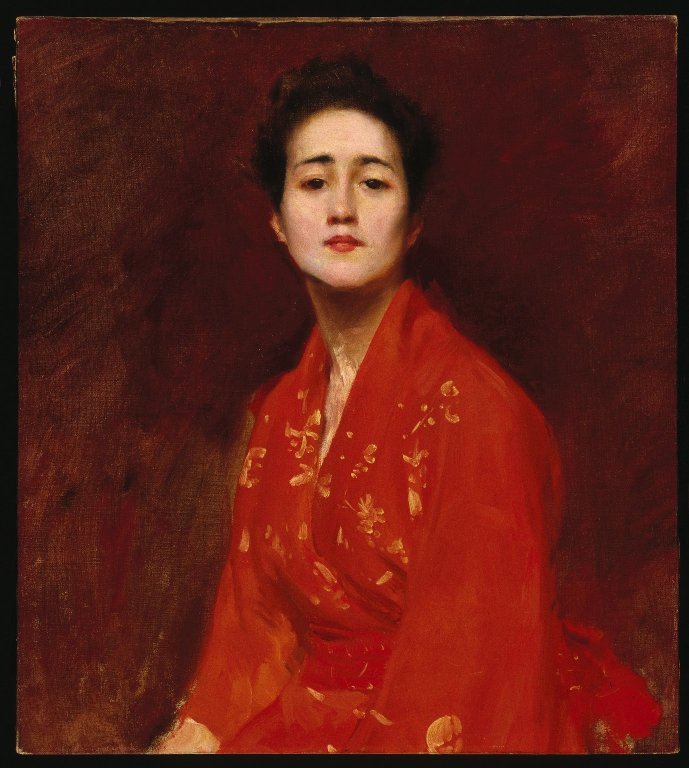
Study of a Girl in Japanese Dress c. 1895 Brooklyn Museum

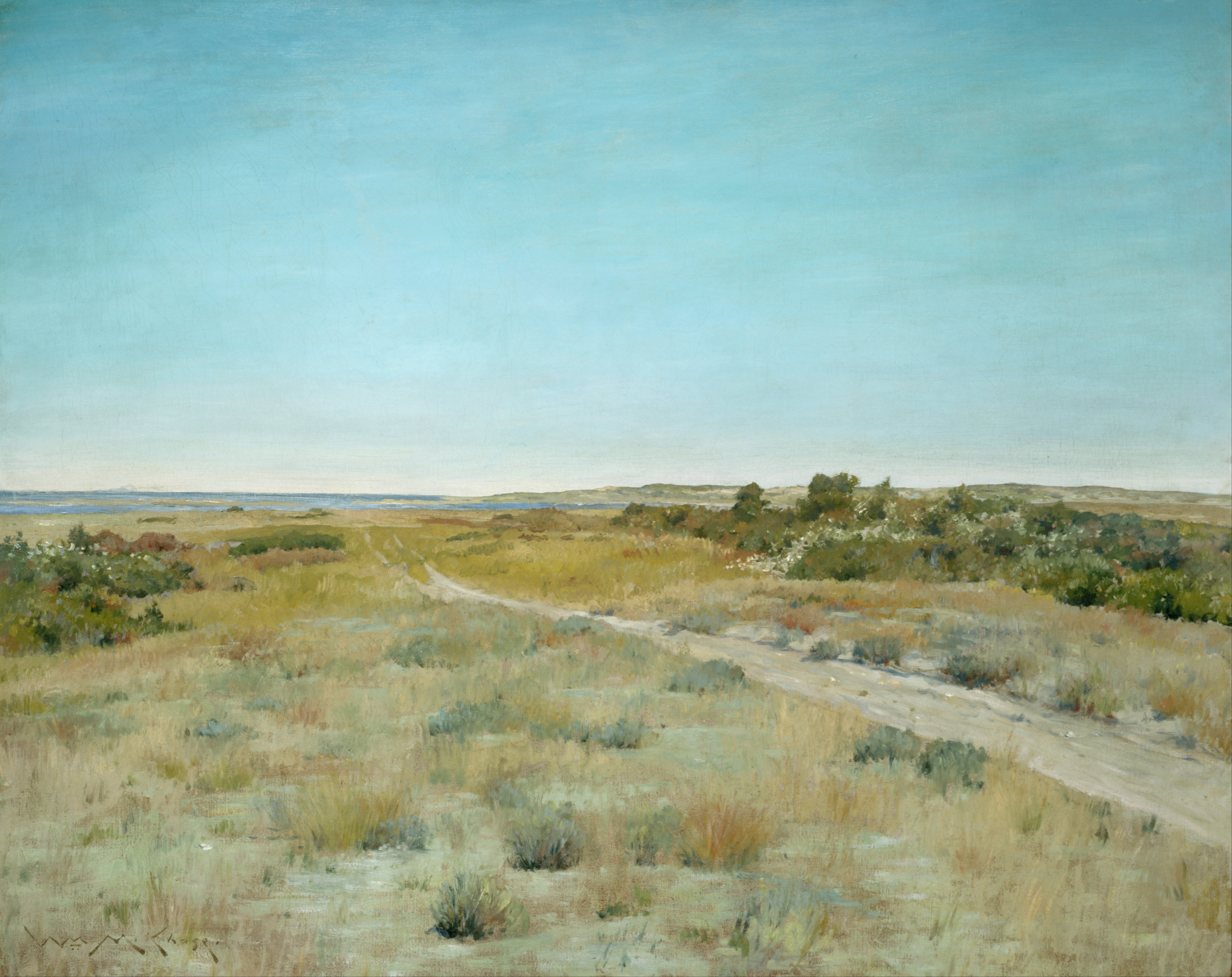
First Touch of Autumn, 1898

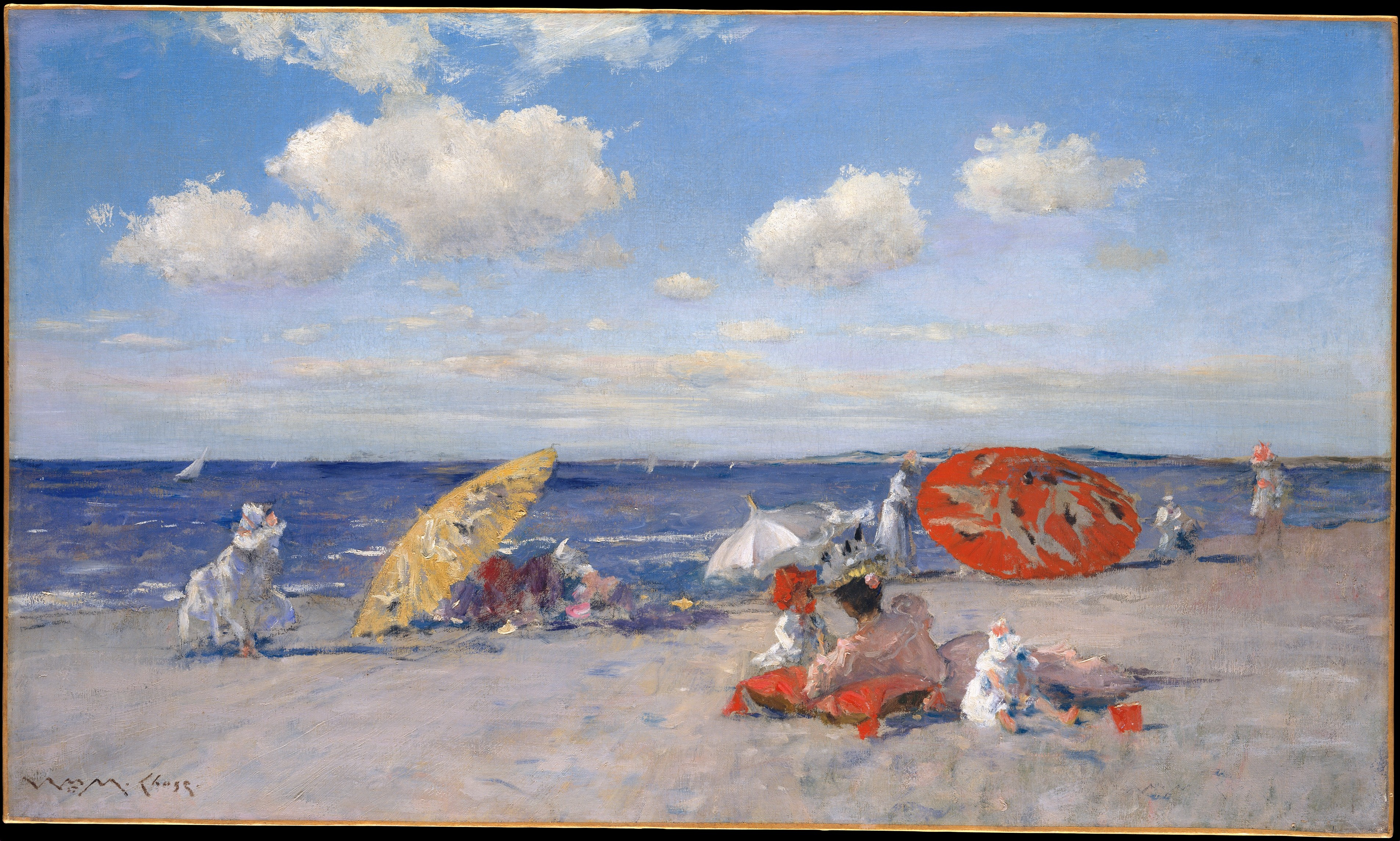
At the Seaside, circa 1898, Metropolitan Museum of Art

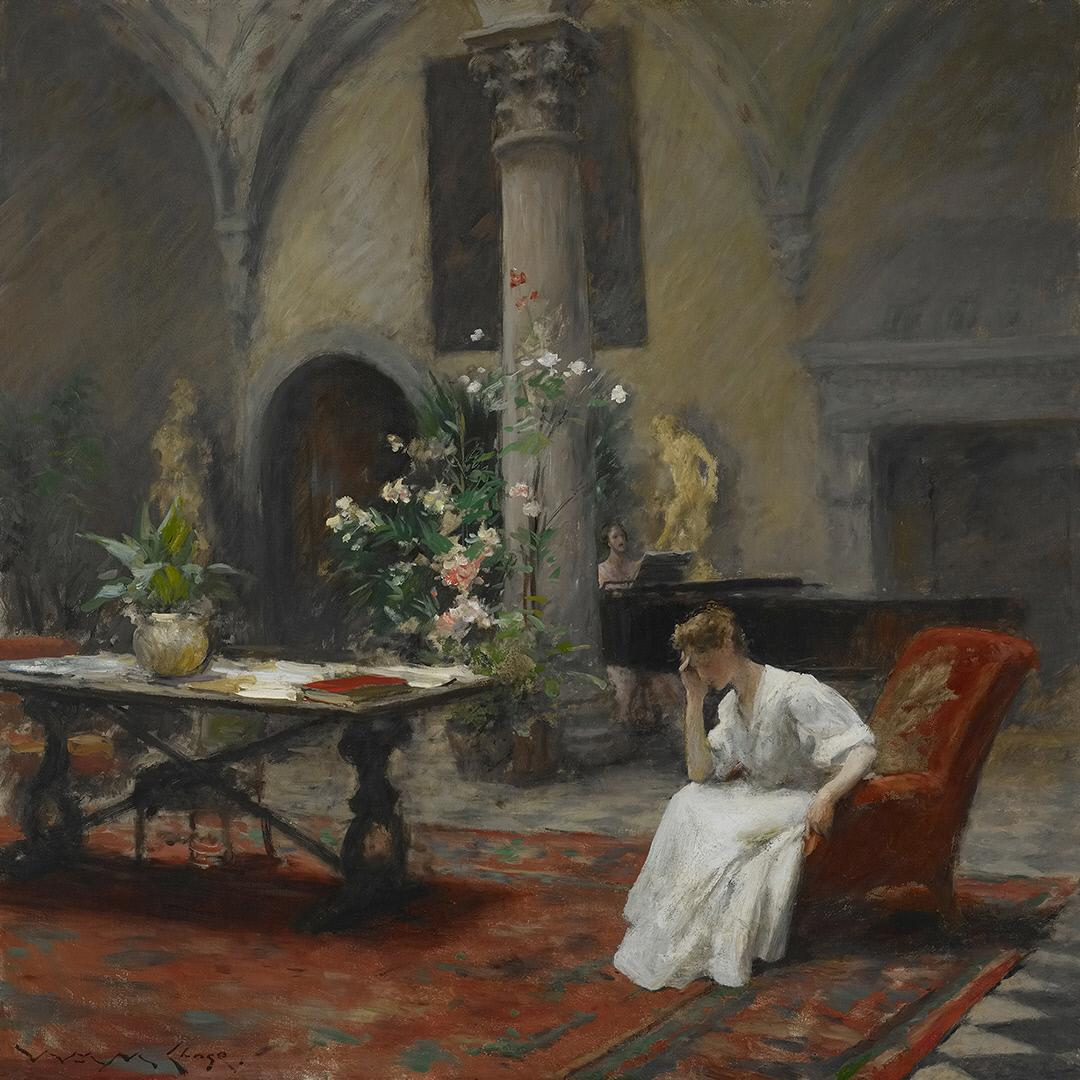
The Song, 1907

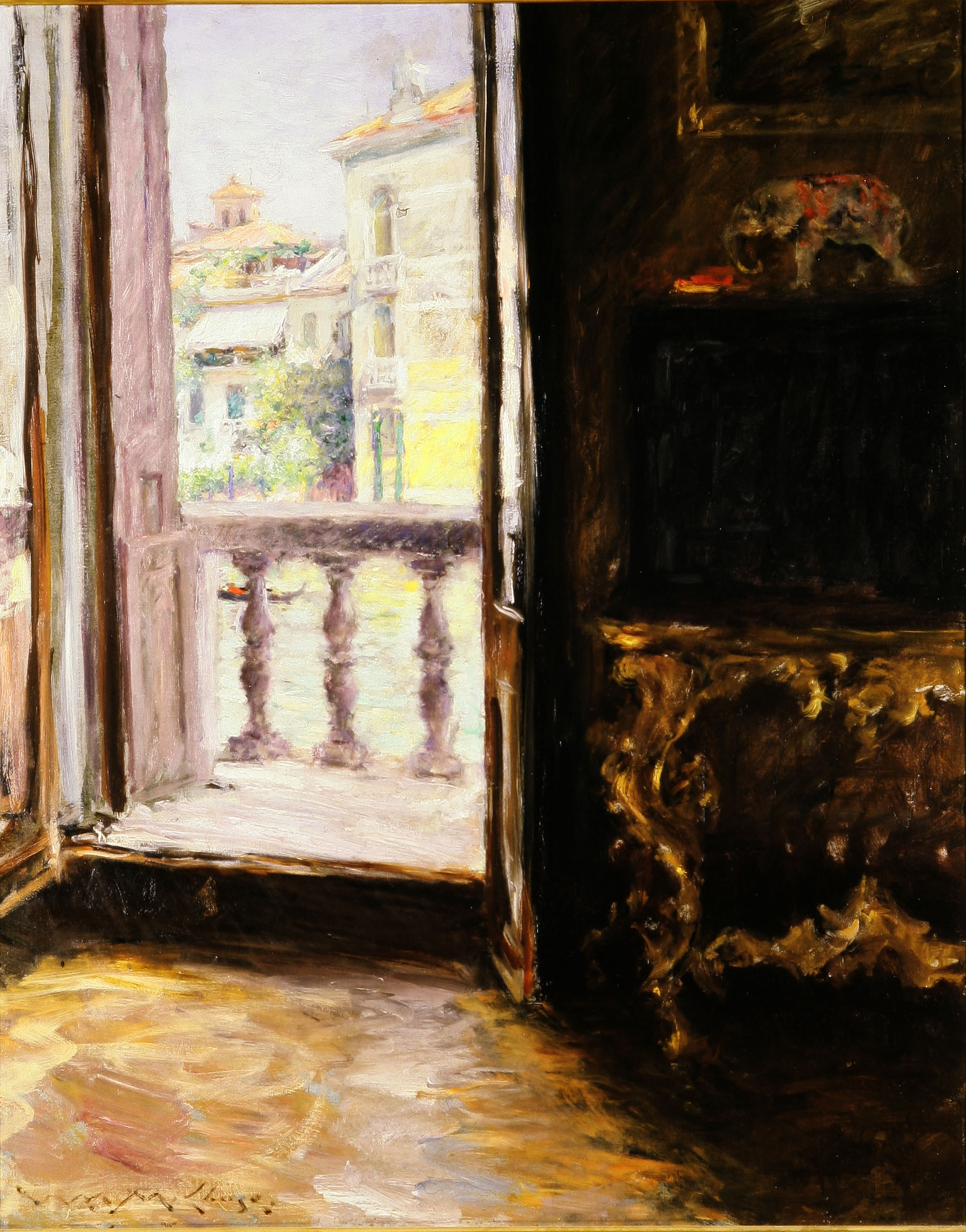
A Venetian Balcony, 1913, Albrecht-Kemper Museum of Art

== See also ==
- American Impressionism
- Belle Silveira
- List of William Merritt Chase artwork
