= Catharine Wharton Wright =

American artist (1899–1988)

- self portrait 1933
- Born: Catharine Wharton Morris; 1899
- Died: 1988 (aged 88–89)
- Known for: Painting

Catharine Wharton Wright (1899–1988) was an American painter known for her landscapes and portraits.

Wright née Morris was born on January 26, 1899, in Philadelphia, Pennsylvania. She attended the Philadelphia School of Design for Women. Her teachers included Leopold Seyffert and Henry B. Snell. She married Sydney L. Wright in 1925. she was voted an Associate of the National Academy of Design in 1933 and became a National Academician in 1969.

Wright was also a writer. She wrote articles for the Atlantic Monthly and the Saturday Evening Post. In 1957 her autobiography The Color of Life was published by Houghton Mifflin.

Wright died in Jamestown, Rhode Island in 1988. Her paintings are in the collection of the Philadelphia Museum of Art and the Pennsylvania Academy of the Fine Arts.
