= National Academy of Design =

Professional honorary art organization

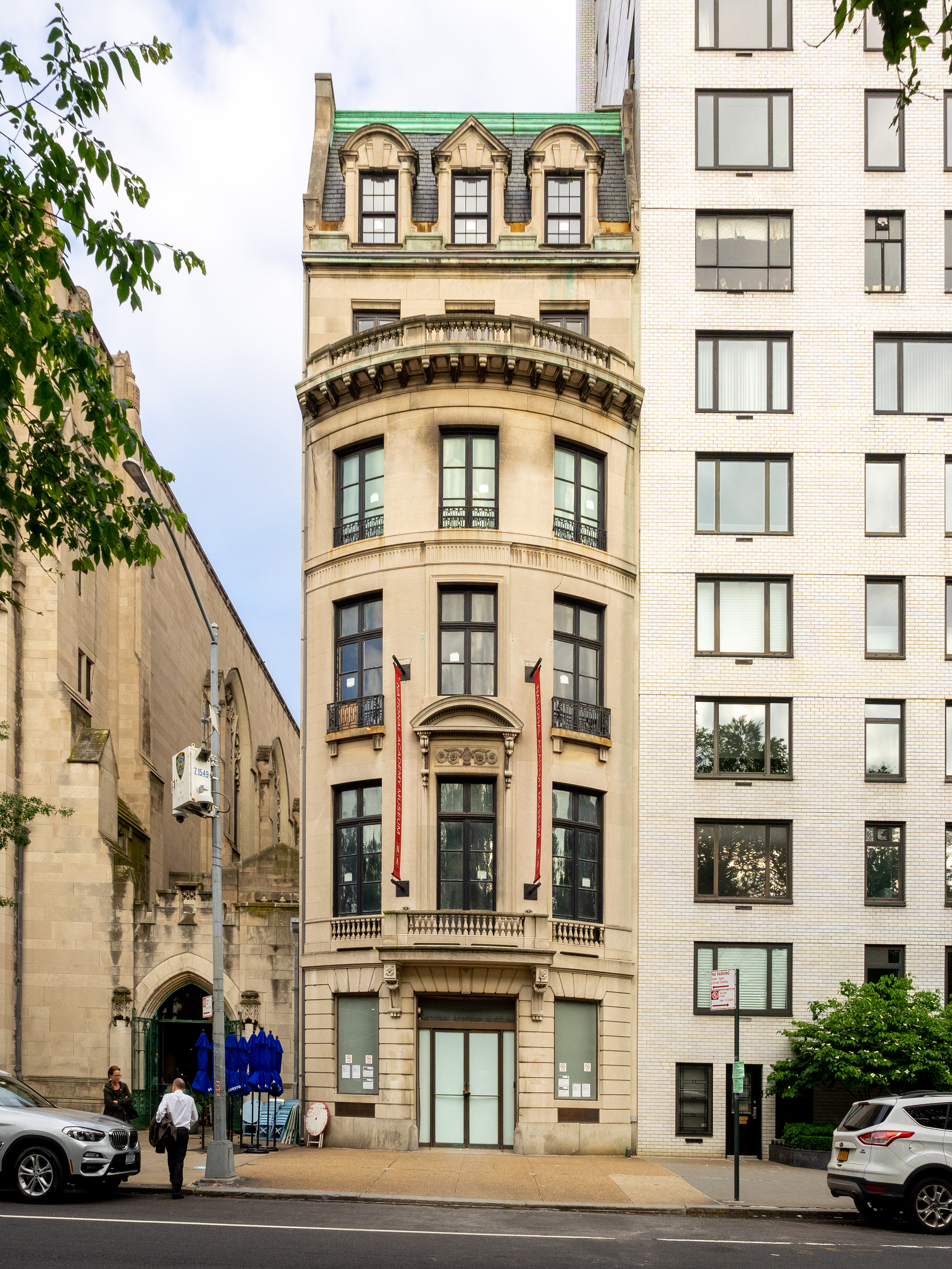
- The academy's previous building at 1083 Fifth Avenue
- Formation: 1825; 201 years ago
- Type: Honorary organization, museum, and school
- Headquarters: Manhattan, New York City, U.S.
- Location: 14-15 Gramercy Park South
- Coordinates: 40°44′16″N 73°59′12″W
- President: Wendy Evans Joseph
- Website: nationalacademy.org

The National Academy of Design is an honorary association of American artists, founded in New York City in 1825 by Samuel Morse, Asher Durand, Thomas Cole, Frederick Styles Agate, Martin E. Thompson, Charles Cushing Wright, Ithiel Town, and others "to promote the fine arts in America through instruction and exhibition." Membership is limited to 450 American artists and architects, who are elected by their peers on the basis of recognized excellence.

== History ==
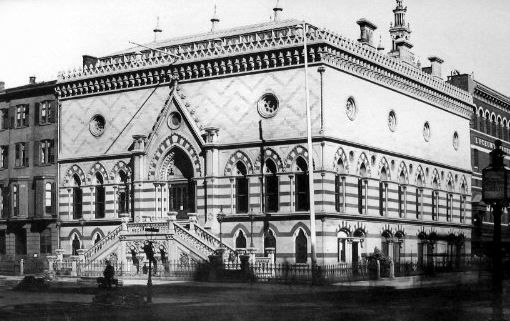
The National Academy of Design in New York City. It was one of many Gothic revival buildings modeled on the Doge's Palace in Venice. Demolished 1901.

The original founders of the National Academy of Design were students of the American Academy of the Fine Arts. However, by 1825 the students of the American Academy felt a lack of support for teaching from the academy, its board composed of merchants, lawyers, and physicians, and from its unsympathetic president, the painter John Trumbull.

Samuel Morse and other students set about forming a drawing association to meet several times each week for the study of the art of design. Still, the association was viewed as a dependent organization of the American Academy, from which they felt neglected. An attempt was made to reconcile differences and maintain a single academy by appointing six of the artists from the association as directors of the American Academy. When four of the nominees were not elected, however, the frustrated artists resolved to form a new academy and the National Academy of Design was born. Morse had been a student at the Royal Academy of Arts in London and emulated its structure and goals for the National Academy of Design. The mission of the academy, from its foundation, was to "promote the fine arts in America through exhibition and education."

In 2015, the academy struggled with financial hardship. In the next few years, it closed its museum and art school, and created an endowment through the sale of its New York real estate holdings. Today, the academy advocates for the arts as a tool for education, celebrates the role of artists and architects in public life, and serves as a catalyst for cultural conversations that propel society forward. According to the academy, its 450 National Academicians "are professional artists and architects who are elected to membership by their peers annually."

=== Official names ===
After three years and some tentative names, in 1828 the academy found its longstanding name "National Academy of Design", under which it was known to one and a half centuries. In 1997, newly appointed director Annette Blaugrund rebranded the institution as the "National Academy Museum and School of Fine Art", to reflect "a new spirit of integration incorporating the association of artists, museum, and school", and to avoid confusion with the now differently understood term "design". This change was reversed in 2017.

- 1825 The New York Drawing Association
- 1826 The National Academy of The Arts of Design
- 1828 The National Academy of Design
- 1997 The National Academy Museum and School of Fine Art
- 2017 The National Academy of Design

=== Locations ===
The academy occupied several locations in Manhattan over the years. Notable among them was a building on Park Avenue and 23rd Street, designed by architect P. B. Wight and built in a Venetian Gothic style from 1863 to 1865. The next location was at West 109th Street and Amsterdam Avenue from 1899 to 1941. From 1906 to 1941, the academy's offices and exhibitions occupied the American Fine Arts Society building at 215 West 57th Street.

From 1942 to 2019, the academy was in a mansion at 1083 Fifth Avenue, near 89th Street; it had been the home of sculptor Anna Hyatt Huntington and philanthropist Archer M. Huntington, who donated the house in 1940. The National Academy of Design shared offices and galleries with the National Arts Club located inside the historic Samuel J. Tilden House, 14-15 Gramercy Park South from 2019 until 2023.

The home of the National Academy of Design is at 519 West 26th Street, 2nd Floor with offices in addition to meeting, event, and exhibition space.

== Organization and activities ==
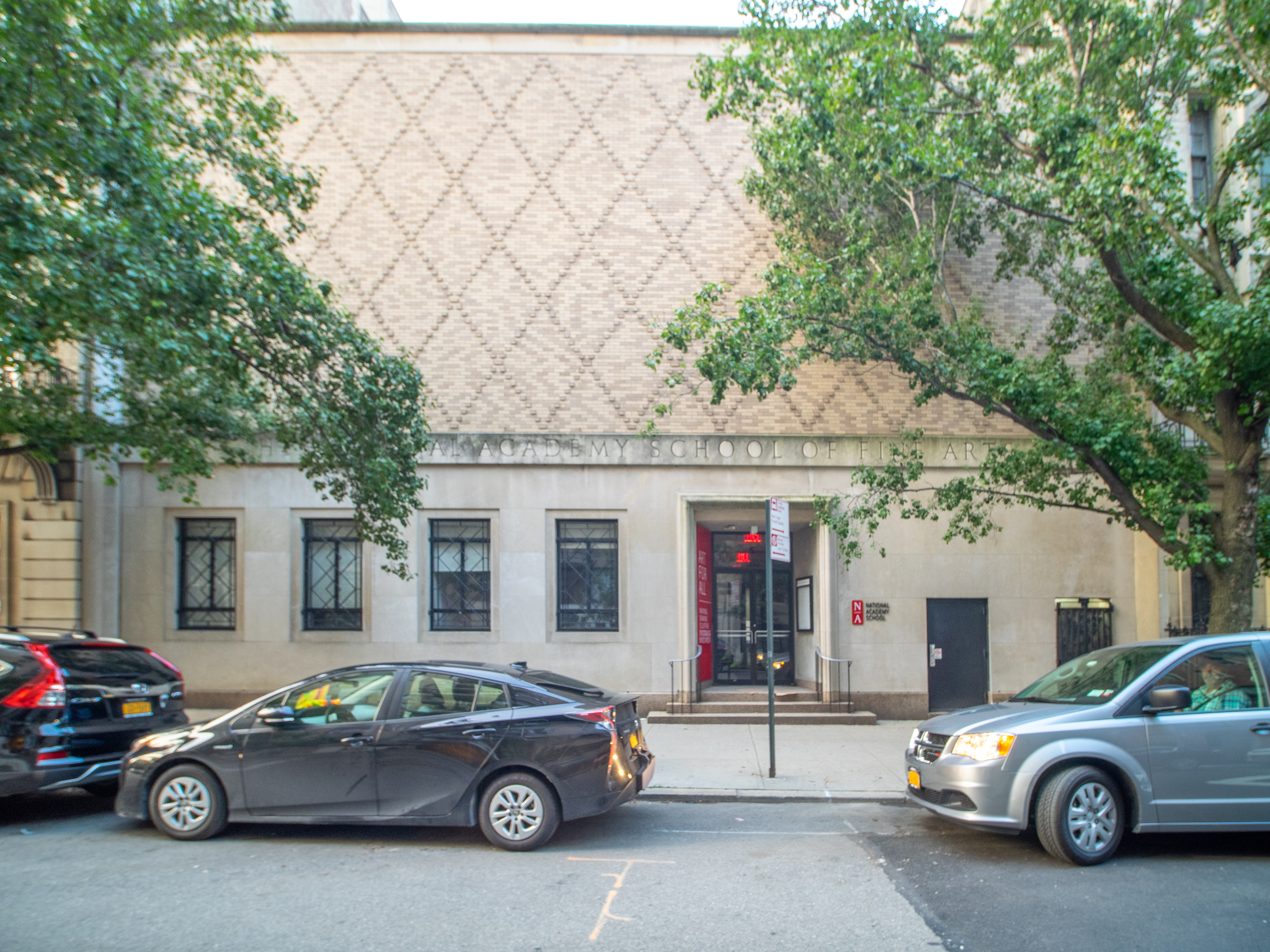
The National Academy School of Fine Arts

The academy is a professional honorary organization, with a school and a museum. It is not possible to apply for membership, which since 1994, after many changes in numbers, is limited to 450 American artists and architects. Instead, members are elected by their peers on the basis of recognized excellence. Full members of the National Academy are identified by the post-nominal "NA" (National Academician), associates by "ANA".

== Notable instructors ==
Among the teaching staff were numerous artists including Will Hicok Low, who taught from 1889 to 1892. Another was Charles Louis Hinton, whose long tenure started in 1901 until 1948. William Cullen Bryant, a famous American poet, also gave lectures. Architect Alexander Jackson Davis taught at the academy. Painter Lemuel Wilmarth was the first full-time instructor. Silas Dustin was a curator.

== Notable members ==
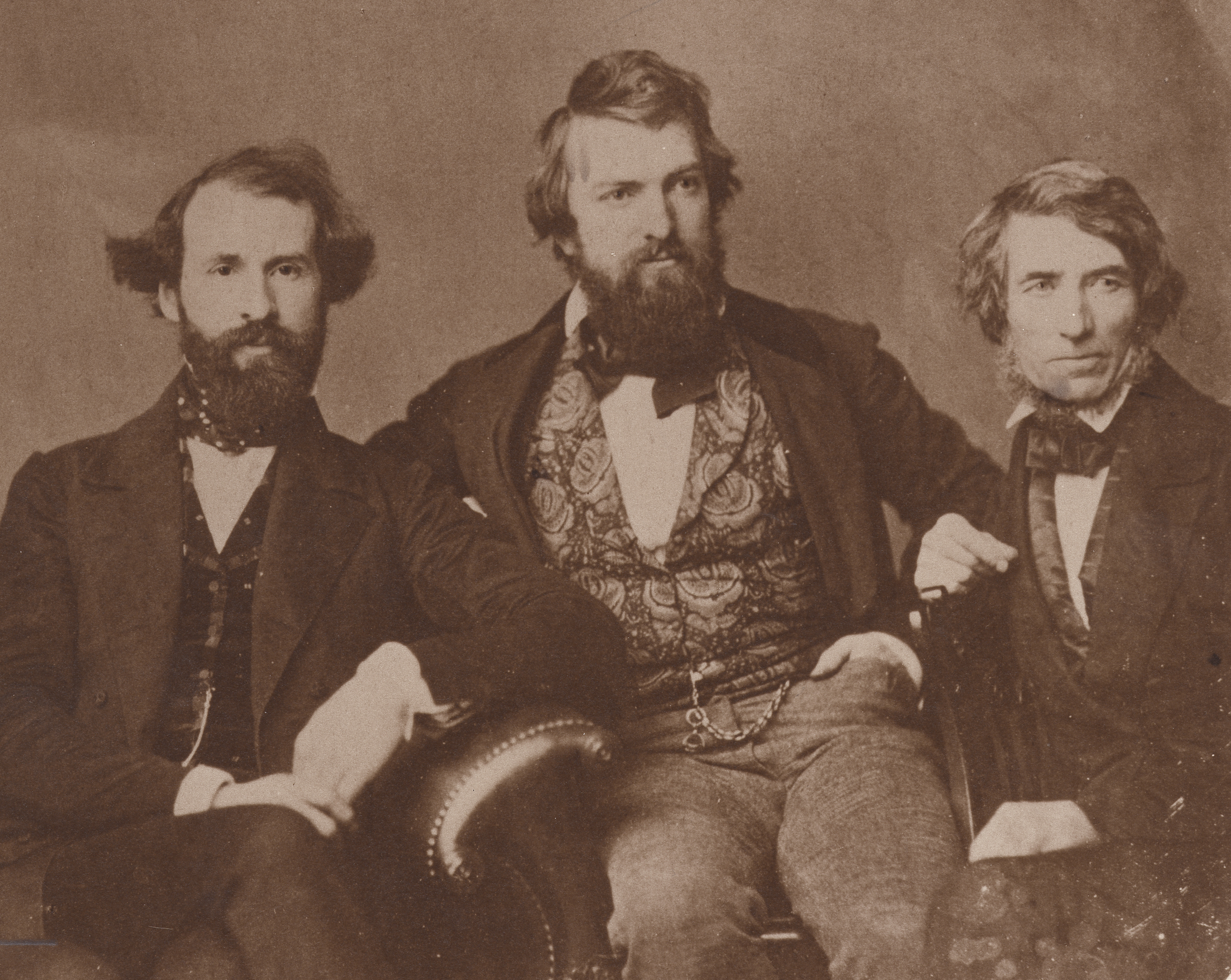
A few members in 1850 (L to R): Henry Kirke Brown, Henry Peters Gray, and founding member Asher Brown Durand.

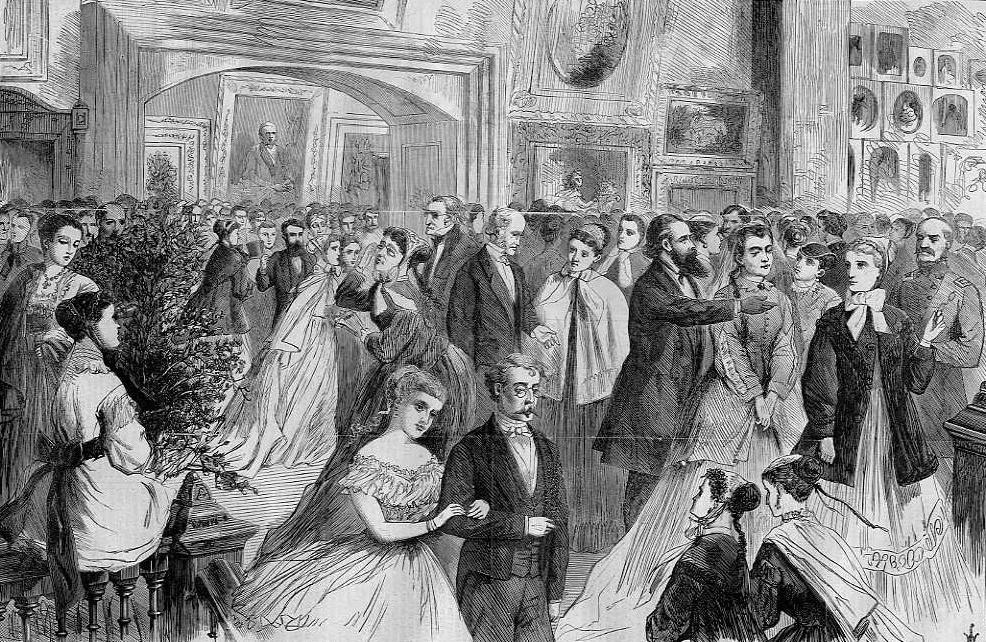
Annual Reception at the National Academy of Design, New York, 1868, a wood engraving from a sketch by W. S. L. Jewett

- Marina Abramović
- Benjamin Abramowitz
- Tore Asplund
- James Henry Beard
- Linda Besemer
- Edwin Blashfield
- Lee Bontecou
- Stanley Boxer
- George Elmer Browne
- Walker O. Cain
- Vija Celmins
- William Merritt Chase
- Frederic Edwin Church
- Chuck Close
- Thomas Cole
- Colin Campbell Cooper
- Leon Dabo
- Cyrus Dallin
- William Parsons Winchester Dana
- Charles Harold Davis
- Henry Golden Dearth
- Jose de Creeft
- Richard Diebenkorn
- William Henry Drake
- Thomas Eakins
- Lydia Field Emmet
- Herbert Ferber
- François Flameng
- Bruce Fowle
- Helen Frankenthaler
- Gilbert Franklin
- Daniel Chester French
- Frederick Carl Frieseke
- Sonia Gechtoff
- Frank Gehry
- John George Brown
- Paul Georges
- Arthur Hill Gilbert
- Aaron Goodelman
- Hardie Gramatky
- Horatio Greenough
- Thomas B. Griffin
- Red Grooms
- Armin Hansen
- L. Birge Harrison
- Edward Lamson Henry
- Itshak Holtz
- Winslow Homer
- Cecil de Blaquiere Howard
- George Inness
- Eric Isenburger
- Hazel Brill Jackson
- Jasper Johns
- Frank Tenney Johnson
- Lester Johnson
- Wolf Kahn
- Charles Keck
- Ellsworth Kelly
- Greta Kempton
- Everett Raymond Kinstler
- Chaim Koppelman
- Ann Kocsis
- Leo Lentelli
- Emanuel Leutze
- Hayley Lever
- Maya Lin
- Frank Lobdell
- Evelyn Beatrice Longman
- Frederick William Macmonnies
- Knox Martin
- Henry Mattson
- Michael Mazur
- Jervis McEntee
- Gari Melchers
- Alme Meyvis
- Raoul Middleman
- F. Luis Mora
- Henry Siddons Mowbray
- John Mulvany
- David Dalhoff Neal
- Victor Nehlig
- Eliot Noyes
- Kate Orff
- Tom Otterness
- William Page
- Philip Pearlstein
- I. M. Pei
- John Thomas Peele
- Judy Pfaff
- Renzo Piano
- William Lamb Picknell
- Albin Polasek
- Alfred Easton Poor
- John Portman
- Alexander Phimister Proctor
- Harvey Quaytman
- Andrew Raftery
- Robert Rauschenberg
- Benjamin Franklin Reinhart
- Paul Resika
- Priscilla Roberts
- Dorothea Rockburne
- Mario Romañach
- Albert Pinkham Ryder
- Robert Ryman
- Augustus Saint-Gaudens
- John Singer Sargent
- Eugene Francis Savage
- Emily Maria Scott
- Richard Serra
- Susan Louise Shatter
- Lorraine Shemesh
- Elliott Fitch Shepard
- Rhoda Sherbell
- Cindy Sherman
- William Siegel
- Hughie Lee-Smith
- Nancy Spero
- Frederic Dorr Steele
- Theodore Clement Steele
- Frank Stella
- Arthur Fitzwilliam Tait
- Katharine Lamb Tait
- Jesse Talbot
- Reuben Tam
- Henry Ossawa Tanner
- Edmund C. Tarbell
- Louis Comfort Tiffany
- Jules Turcas
- Cy Twombly
- Edward Charles Volkert
- Robert Vonnoh
- William Guy Wall
- John Quincy Adams Ward
- Harry Watrous
- Carrie Mae Weems
- Stow Wengenroth
- Frederic Whitaker
- Carleton Wiggins
- Guy Carleton Wiggins
- Anita Willets-Burnham
- Catharine Wharton Wright
- Frank Lloyd Wright
- Jimmy Wright
- Dorothy Weir Young
- Milford Zornes
- Alfred Cheney Johnston

== See also ==
- American Watercolor Society (located within the National Academy of Design)
- Effects of the Great Recession on museums
- List of museums and cultural institutions in New York City
