= Kočiš (surname) =

Kočiš (feminine: Kočišová) and Kociš (feminine: Kocišová) are Slovak surnames. Both are transcription of the Hungarian surname Kocsis. Notable people with the surnames include:

- Bryan Kocis (1962–2007), American pornographer
- Ján Eugen Kočiš (1926–2019), Slovak-Czech Ruthenian Greek Catholic hierarch
- Róbert Kociš (born 1973), Slovak footballer
- Tereza Kočiš (born 1934), Serbian gymnast
