= Kuci =

Kuci may refer to:

- KUCI, California radio station
- Kuči, Region in Montenegro
- Kuç (disambiguation), several villages in Albania
