= Václav Kočí =

Czech ice hockey player

- Born: July 15, 1979 (age 45); Prague, Czechoslovakia
- Height: 6 ft 1 in (185 cm)
- Weight: 205 lb (93 kg; 14 st 9 lb)
- Position: Defence
- Shot: Left
- Czech Extraliga team: HC Pardubice
- Playing career: 2000–2017

Václav Kočí (born July 15, 1979) is a Czech former professional ice hockey defenceman. He played with HC Pardubice in the Czech Extraliga during the 2010–11 Czech Extraliga season.

== Career statistics ==
			Regular season					Playoffs
Season	Team	League	GP	G	A	Pts	PIM	GP	G	A	Pts	PIM
1996–97	HC Liberec U20	Czech U20	38	4	11	15	—	—	—	—	—	—
1997–98	HC Liberec U20	Czech U20	37	9	14	23	—	5	0	1	1	—
1998–99	Bílí Tygři Liberec U20	Czech U20	46	9	11	20	—	—	—	—	—	—
1999–00	HC Liberec U20	Czech U20	34	3	9	12	—	—	—	—	—	—
2000–01	HC Bílí Tygři Liberec	Czech2	25	0	1	1	4	6	0	0	0	14
2000–01	HC Děčín	Czech3	4	1	0	1	8	—	—	—	—	—
2001–02	HC Bílí Tygři Liberec	Czech2	33	0	4	4	14	12	0	5	5	16
2001–02	HC Vlci Jablonec nad Nisou	Czech3	14	0	1	1	53	—	—	—	—	—
2002–03	HC Bílí Tygři Liberec	Czech	30	0	2	2	18	—	—	—	—	—
2002–03	HC Vlci Jablonec nad Nisou	Czech3	—	—	—	—	—	—	—	—	—	—
2003–04	HC České Budějovice	Czech	3	0	0	0	2	—	—	—	—	—
2003–04	HC Slovan Ústečtí Lvi	Czech2	20	3	3	6	24	8	1	1	2	12
2004–05	HC Slovan Ústečtí Lvi	Czech2	50	4	11	15	42	10	3	0	3	4
2005–06	HC Chemopetrol	Czech	10	0	0	0	2	—	—	—	—	—
2005–06	SK Kadaň	Czech2	1	0	0	0	2	—	—	—	—	—
2006–07	HC Bílí Tygři Liberec	Czech	52	0	1	1	56	12	2	1	3	18
2006–07	BK Mladá Boleslav	Czech2	2	1	0	1	4	—	—	—	—	—
2007–08	HC Bílí Tygři Liberec	Czech	36	1	3	4	24	7	0	0	0	10
2008–09	BK Mladá Boleslav	Czech	45	6	10	16	46	—	—	—	—	—
2009–10	HC Pardubice	Czech	51	5	7	12	40	13	0	3	3	8
2010–11	HC Pardubice	Czech	52	4	9	13	48	9	0	1	1	12
2011–12	HC Pardubice	Czech	52	1	11	12	72	19	3	5	8	8
2012–13	HC Pardubice	Czech	52	2	11	13	46	5	0	0	0	4
2013–14	HC Pardubice	Czech	47	2	11	13	46	8	1	2	3	2
2014–15	HC Pardubice	Czech	12	0	1	1	8	—	—	—	—	—
2014–15	BK Mladá Boleslav	Czech	19	1	2	3	42	9	1	3	4	2
2015–16	BK Mladá Boleslav	Czech	3	0	0	0	4	—	—	—	—	—
2016–17	HC Benátky nad Jizerou	Czech2	48	1	11	12	22	2	0	0	0	2
Czech totals			464	22	70	92	456	90	7	16	23	68
Czech2 totals			179	9	30	39	112	38	4	6	10	48
