= Ann Kocsis =

American still-life painter

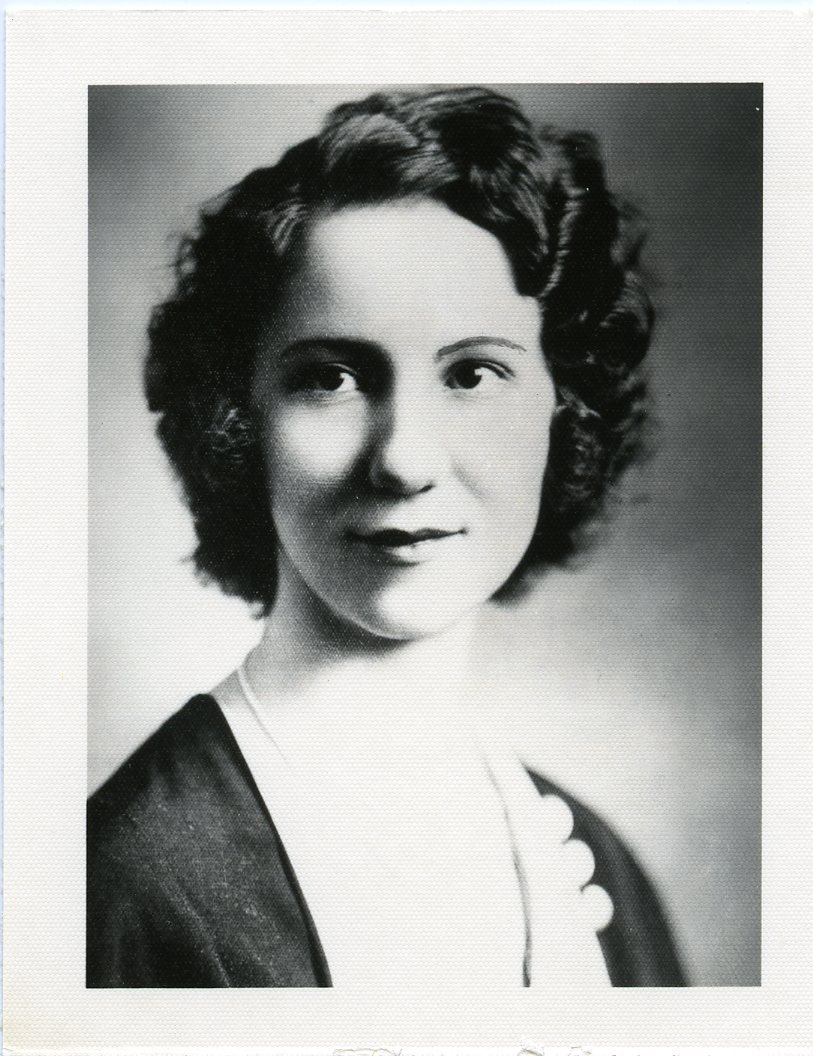
- Born: 1910s New York City
- Died: 1972
- Alma mater: National Academy of Design
- Occupation: Artist
- Style: still life

Ann Kocsis (c. 1910 – 1972) was an American still-life painter who participated in individual and group exhibitions in the United States and internationally. She was an active member of several national arts organizations, and a life fellow of the International Institute of Arts and Letters, Switzerland, and the Royal Society of Arts, London.

== Early life and education ==
Kocsis was born in New York City to Hungarian immigrants John Kocsis and Katie Svidro. At a young age, her family moved to Pittsburgh. Kocsis left school at the age of 15, and apprenticed as a millinery designer. At 17 she worked at a beauty parlor. Her earnings enabled her to attend the Wickersham School of Music and the Art Institute of Pittsburgh.

== Career ==
By the 1930s, Kocsis had returned to New York, where she took classes at the National Academy of Design. In 1939 and 1941 she held solo shows at the Montross Gallery, managed by Philip Reilly. A New York Times review of the 1939 show noted her fastidious style, saying that the work was “all very earnest… carrying with it a distinct sense of subjects being very carefully studied and color and arrangement being very painstakingly thought out,” and suggested that it could have benefited from a less controlled approach. A review by the same writer of the 1941 show was more complimentary, noting that Kocsis' work was “high in key, sound in construction and brushed with assurance and determination”.

In particular her paintings Cleaning Up,World's Fair at Night, Grapes and Cabbage and Palette and Brushes were mentioned. The last won honorable mention in Seton Hall University's 1958 Fourth Annual Spring Art Exhibition. Kocsis also participated in a four-woman show at the Vendome Galleries in 1942, where she was credited with painting "with singing colors in a broad manner" and having "the most sense of design." While the Montross shows appear to have been Kocsis’ only solo exhibitions, she participated in as many as 50 group exhibitions over the course of her career. These group shows were primarily in New York and the United States, but at least two were international including the Japan-America Women Artists Exchange Exhibition of 1960. Kocsis won several awards which are listed in bibliographic resources such as Who’s Who 1937 and 1973.

Kocsis was actively engaged in a number of professional organizations including the American Artists Professional League. She was a life member of the National Arts Club, and served as chair of its arts committee; served on the nominating committee of the National Association of Women Artists; and was corresponding secretary and the second vice-president of the Knickerbocker Artists. She was a life fellow of the International Institute of Arts and Letters, Switzerland, and the Royal Society of Arts, London. Her archive is kept at the Betty Boyd Dettre Library and Research Center at the National Museum of Women in the Arts.
