= Olivio Kocsis-Cake =

Hungarian politician

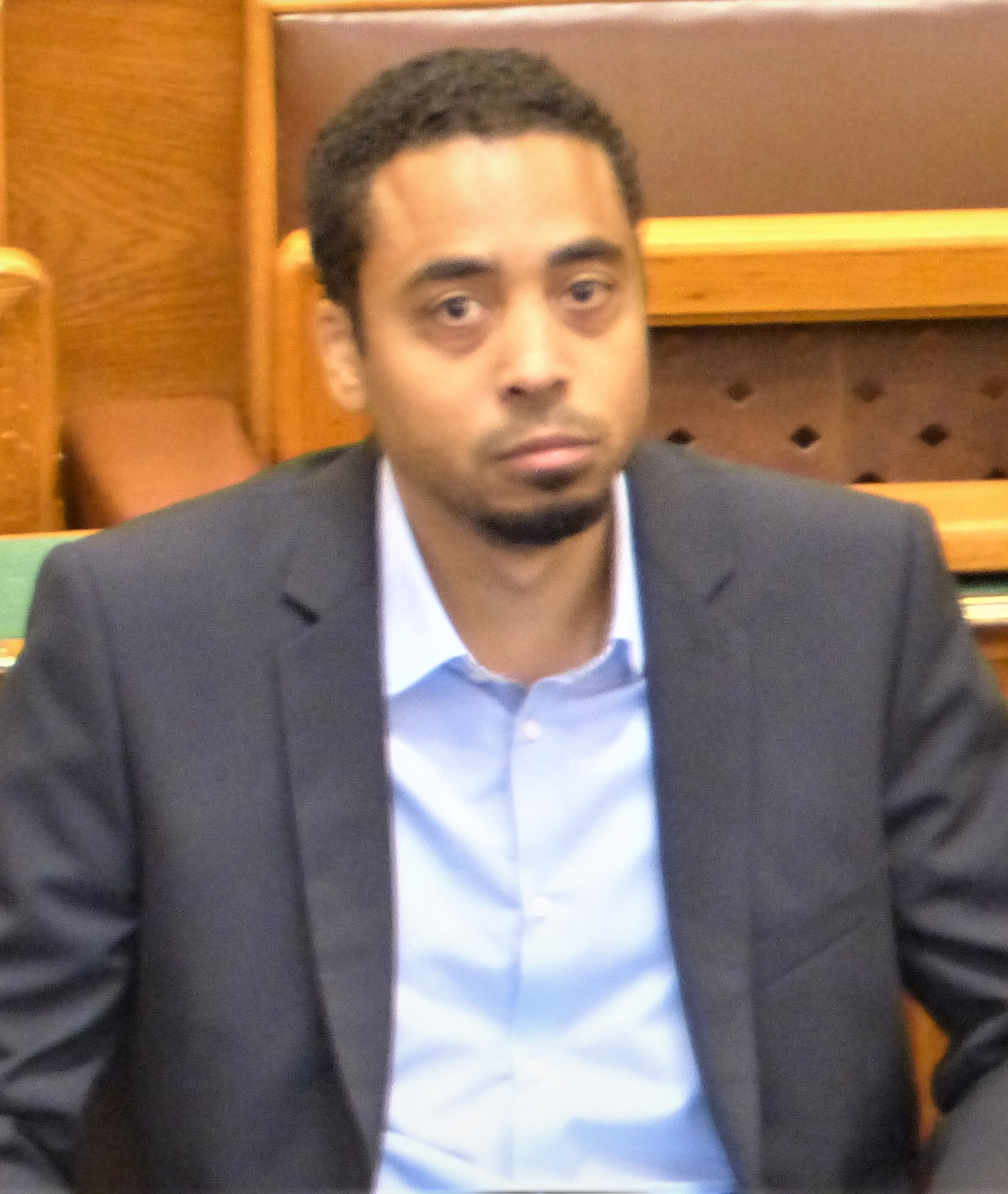

Member of the National Assembly of Hungary
- In office 11 June 2018 – April 2022

Personal details
- Born: 31 March 1980 (age 46) Budapest, Hungary
- Party: Dialogue for Hungary

Olivio Kocsis-Cake (born 31 March 1980 in Budapest, Hungary) is a Hungarian politician. He was a member of parliament in the National Assembly of Hungary (Országgyűlés) from May 2018 until April, 2022. He left the LMP in February 2013, a founding member of the Dialogue for Hungary, and was elected party leader in 2014. In the Hungarian parliamentary elections of 2018, he was elected member of parliament representing Budapest 5th constituency.

During the 2022 general elections of Hungary he failed to make the list for his party, Dialogue for Hungary, and lost his seat in the parliament.
