= Kociszew =

Kociszew may refer to the following places in Poland:

- Kociszew, Łódź Voivodeship
- Kociszew, Masovian Voivodeship
