= Irena Kočí =

Czech politician

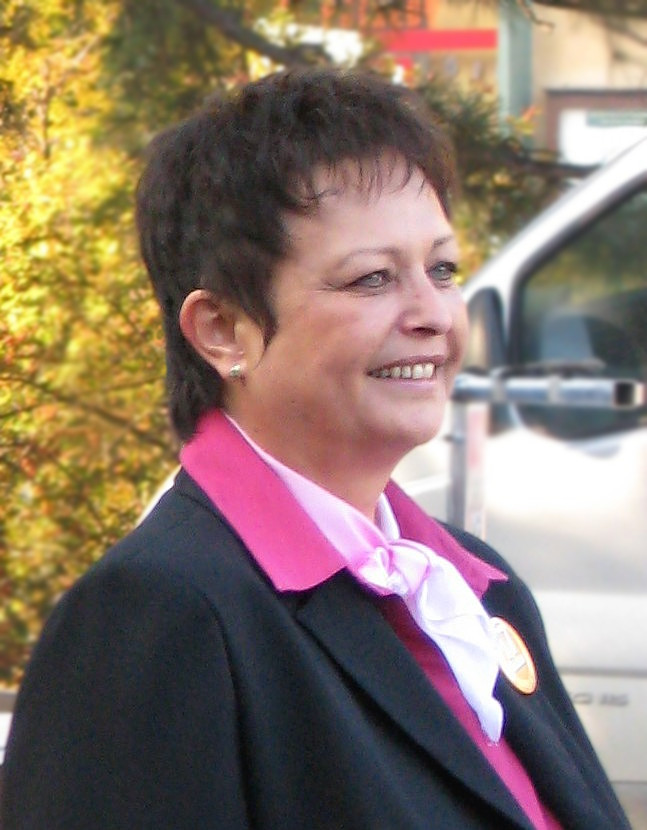
- Irena Kočí during Czech Social Democratic Party campaign in Moravský Krumlov

Member of the Chamber of Deputies for South Moravia
- In office 11 December 2008 – 3 June 2010
- Preceded by: Michal Pohanka
- Constituency: South Moravian Region

Personal details
- Born: 17 September 1955 (age 70) Czechoslovakia
- Party: ČSSD
- Children: 2

Irena Kočí (born 17 September 1955) is a Czech politician and former member of the Chamber of Deputies for Czech Social Democratic Party. She replaced Michal Pohanka, former member of the Chamber for ČSSD, who left the Social Democratic caucus and used to vote with the government parties.

She took her matura exam at the secondary in Moravský Krumlov and continued at an economic secondary school in Brno.

Kočí joined Czech Social Democratic Party in 1998. In 2008, she was elected to the Council of the South Moravian Region.
