= Kočí (Chrudim District) =

- Municipality
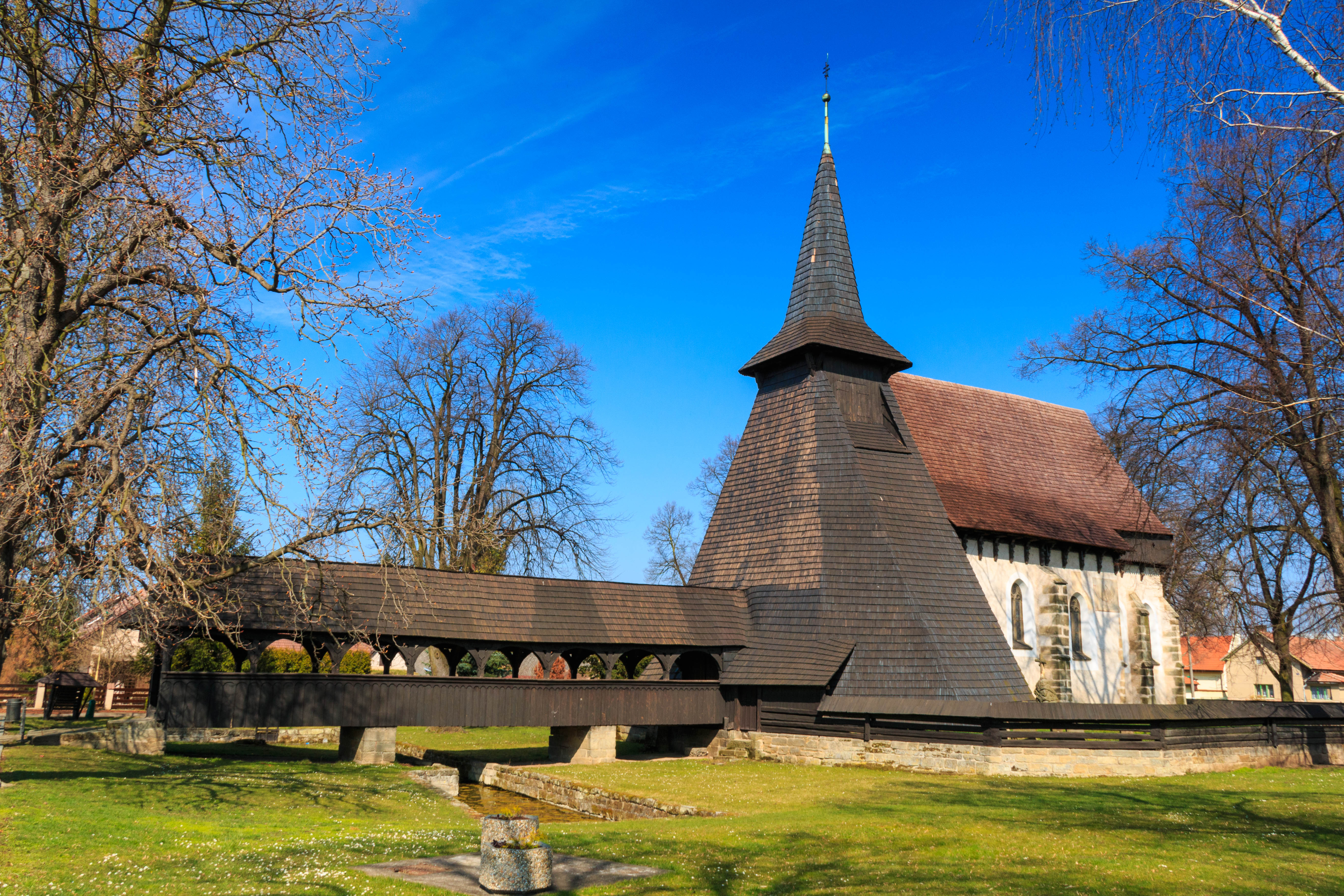
- Church of Saint Bartholomew

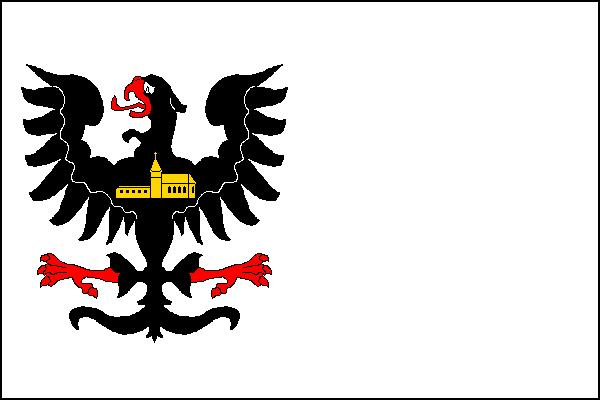
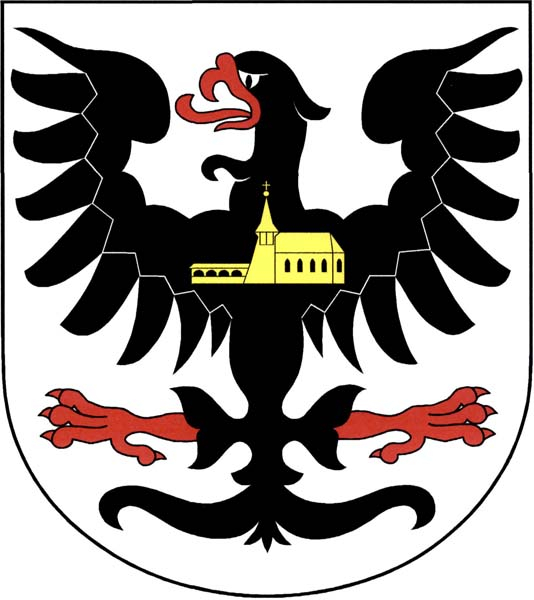
- Flag Coat of arms

- Location in the Czech Republic
- Coordinates: 49°56′50″N 15°51′20″E
- Country: Czech Republic
- Region: Pardubice
- District: Chrudim
- First mentioned: 1399

Area
  - Total: 7.06 km^{2} (2.73 sq mi)
- Elevation: 254 m (833 ft)

Population (2026-01-01)
  - Total: 727
  - Density: 103/km^{2} (267/sq mi)
- Time zone: UTC+1 (CET)
  - Summer (DST): UTC+2 (CEST)
- Postal code: 538 61
- Website: www.obec-koci.cz

Kočí is a municipality and village in Chrudim District in the Pardubice Region of the Czech Republic. It has about 700 inhabitants.

== Demographics ==
Historical population
Year	Pop.	±%
1869	630	—
1880	694	+10.2%
1890	731	+5.3%
1900	851	+16.4%
1910	894	+5.1%
1921	842	−5.8%
1930	854	+1.4%
1950	576	−32.6%
1961	572	−0.7%
1970	526	−8.0%
1980	501	−4.8%
1991	521	+4.0%
2001	577	+10.7%
2011	590	+2.3%
2021	690	+16.9%
Source: Censuses
