= List of works by William Merritt Chase =

This is an incomplete list of William Merritt Chase artwork and consists of works (mostly paintings, but also etchings) listed in three different ways:

- Alphabetically (by the names that museums call their works)
- Chronologically
- By location

The alphabetical list aids in quickly finding information about that work and provides additional information on some individual works; the chronological listing helps trace the artist's development; the location list helps readers discover where they can see Chase's work first-hand.

== Alphabetical listing ==
=== A-D ===
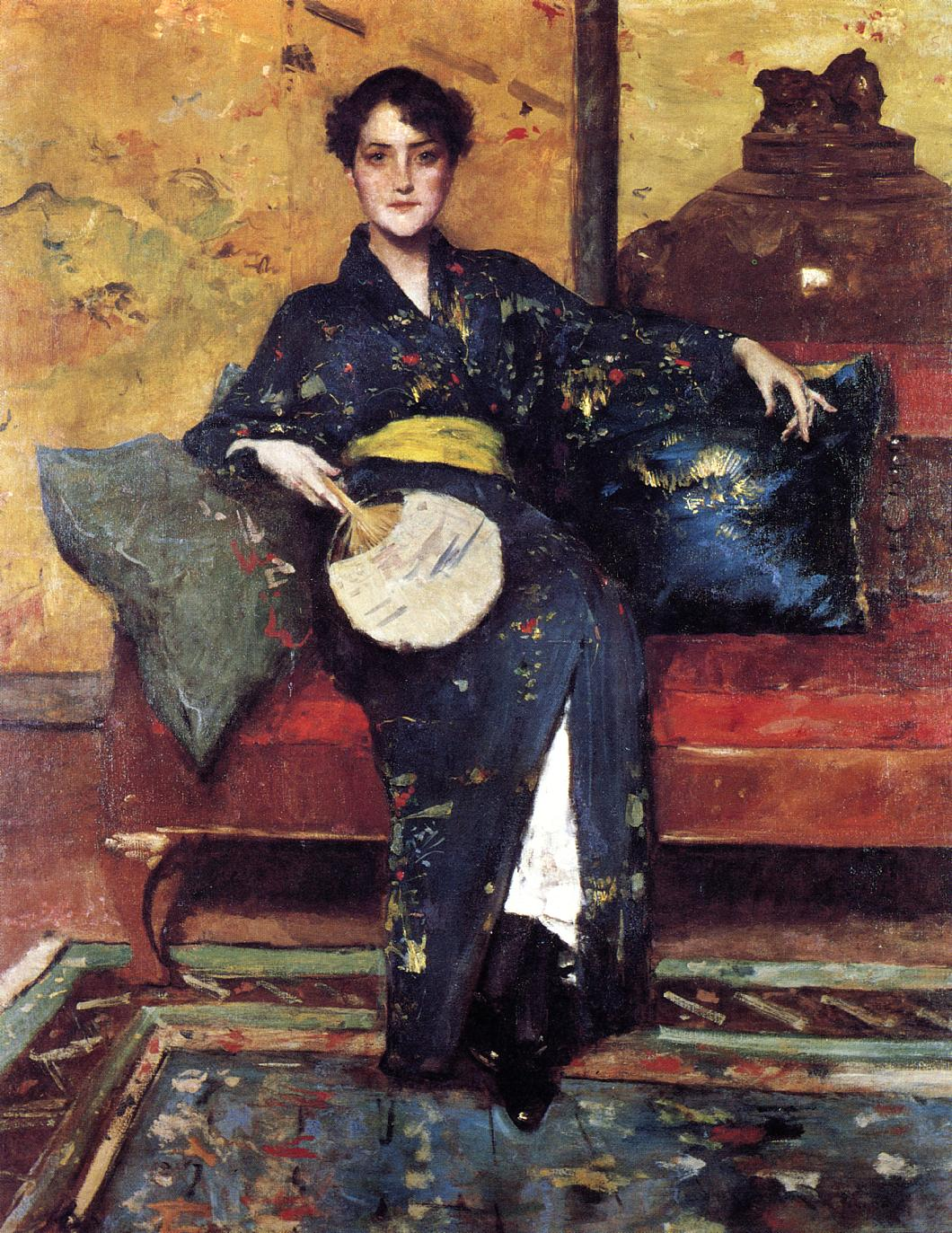
Blue Kimono, 1898 version

A Sunny Day at Shinnecock Bay	c. 1892
Alice Dieudonnée	c. 1892	Terra Museum of American Art, Chicago, Illinois
Alice in Shinnecock Studio	1909	Parrish Art Museum, Southampton, New York
Along the Canal		Art Gallery of the University of Rochester, New York
The Antiquary Shop	1879	Brooklyn Museum, New York, N.Y.
Arab Boy		Indianapolis Museum of Art, Indiana
Artist's Daughter in Mother's; Dress (Young Girl in Black)	c. 1899	Hirshhorn Museum and Sculpture Garden, Washington, D.C.
The Artist's Mother, Sarah Swaim Chase	1892	Indianapolis Museum of Art, Indiana
At the Seaside	c. 1892	Metropolitan Museum of Art, New York City
At Her Ease	1884	National Academy of Design, New York City
Autumn Still Life		Pennsylvania Academy of the Fine Arts, Philadelphia
The Bayberry Bush		Parrish Art Museum, Southampton, New York
The Big Brass Bowl	1899	Indianapolis Museum of Art, Indiana
The Blue Kimono	1898	Parrish Art Museum, Southampton, New York

- The Blue Kimono, 1914, Philbrook Museum of Art, Tulsa, Oklahoma

One of a number of Chase's paintings with Oriental motifs and inspired by Diego Velázquez and seventeenth-century Dutch masters, a fleeting moment is captured with the model striking a "studious yet captured pose", according to the painting's description at the Philbrook Museum of Art Web site. The work features a "flourish of contours, stunning colors, decorative patterns and broad, broken brushwork". Oriental decorative and design elements are incorporated, perhaps showing the influence of Chase's contemporaries, James Abbott McNeill Whistler and John Singer Sargent.

Carll H. de Silver	c. 1909	Brooklyn Museum, New York City
A City Park		Art Institute of Chicago
The Court Jester (etching)		Museum of Fine Arts, Boston, Massachusetts
The Deserted Beach	1907	Maier Museum of Art, Randolph College, Virginia

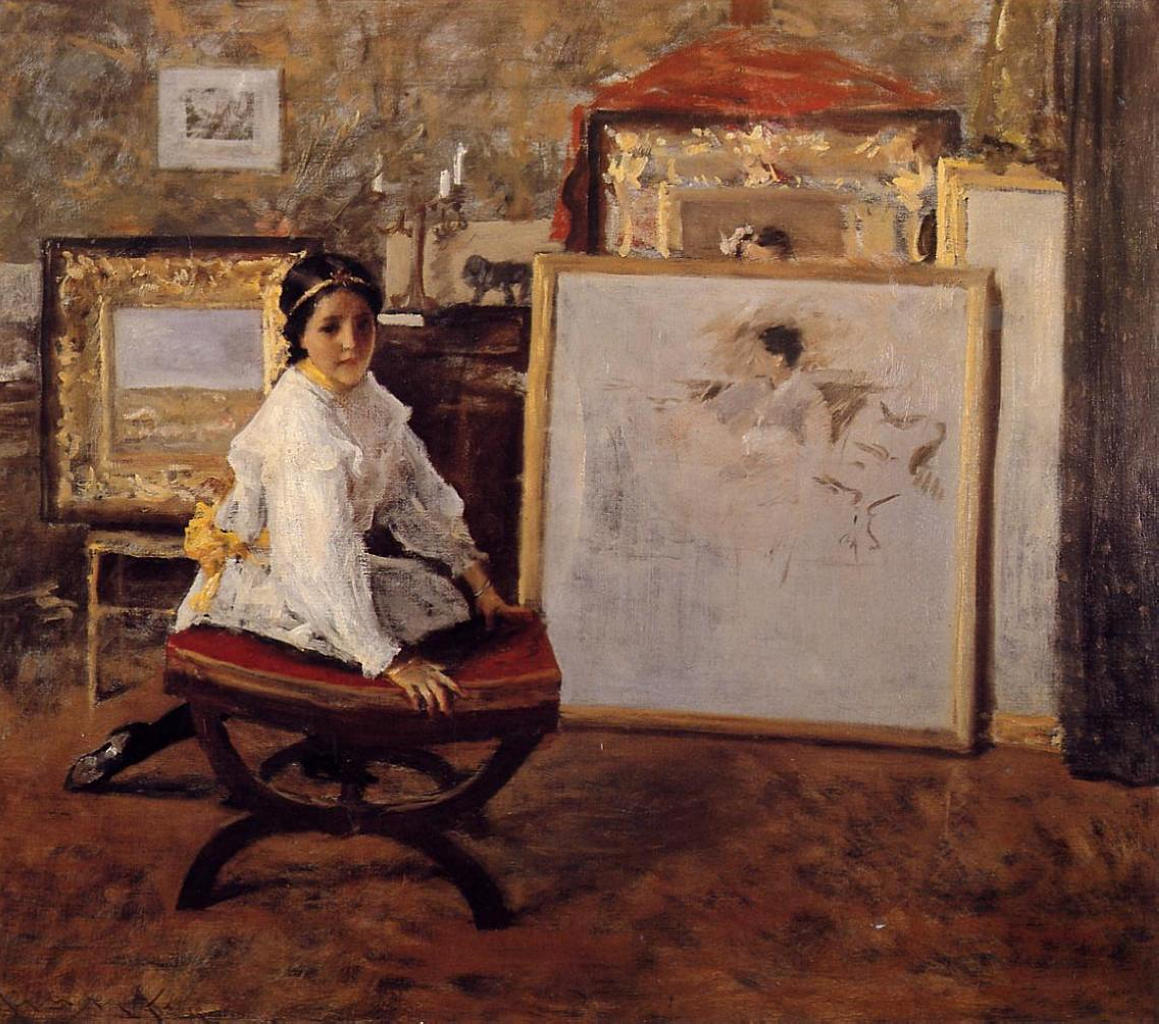
Did You Speak to Me?

- Did You Speak to Me?, 1897, Butler Institute of American Art, Youngstown, Ohio

The painting focuses on the girl's implied movement (she has just turned around from looking at one of the paintings), by rendering her in greater detail than the objects around her. The girl is Alice Dieudonne, Chase's daughter, then 10 years old, at his studio at Shinnecock Hills on Long Island. Her bracelets and gold hair band suggest genteel, graceful prosperity, and it has been said that the paintings also suggest it, although Chase at that point had some difficulty maintaining his lifestyle. The painting captures "a casual image of life suspended in time which, while looking effortless and unpremeditated, was actually carefully composed to reflect the movement of real people in real life situations." Chase learned much of this from French Impressionists. The artist was also enamored of the Dutch painter Frans Hals, who also strove to capture moments in time.

Dora Wheeler	1882–1883	Cleveland Museum of Art, Ohio
Dorothy	1902	Indianapolis Museum of Art, Indiana
Duveneck in His Studio		San Antonio Art League Museum, Texas

=== E-K ===
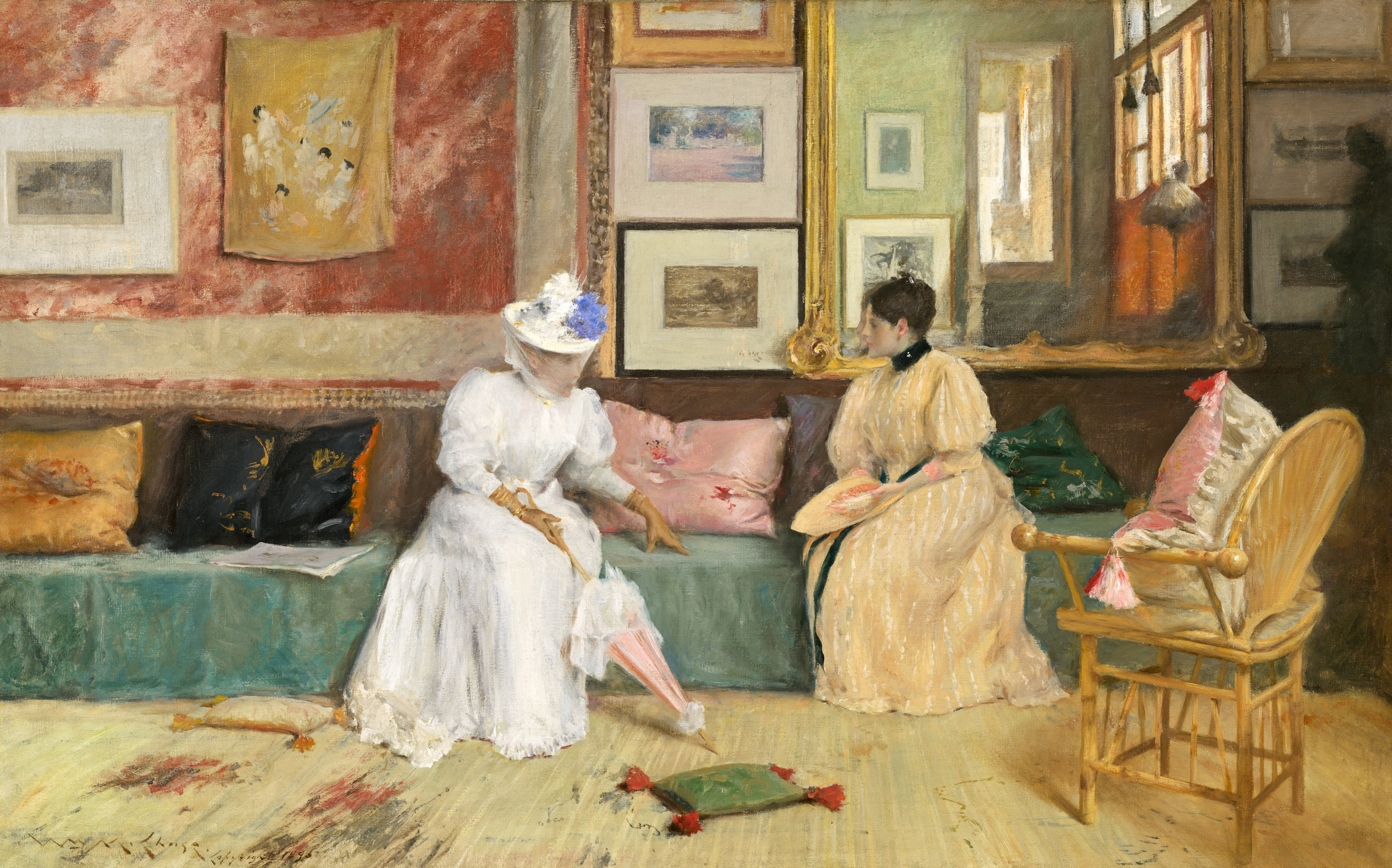
A Friendly Call, 1895, National Gallery of Art, Washington, D.C.

Edward Everett Hale		Fogg Museum, Harvard University, Cambridge, Massachusetts
The Fairy Tale	1892	National Gallery of Art, Washington, D.C.
The Family Cow	1869	Indianapolis Museum of Art, Indiana
Fish, Plate, and Copper Container	c. 1910	Washington County Museum of Fine Arts, Hagerstown, Maryland
First Touch of Autumn	1897-99	Indianapolis Museum of Art, Indiana
Floral Still Life with Hummingbird	1870	Indianapolis Museum of Art, Indiana
Florence		Brooklyn Museum, New York City
A Friendly Call	1895	National Gallery of Art, Washington D.C.
General James Watson Webb	1880	Shelburne Museum, Shelburne, Vermont
Girl in a Japanese Costume	c. 1890	Brooklyn Museum, New York City
Girl in White	c. 1890	Smithsonian American Art Museum, Washington, D.C.
Girl With Book	c. 1902	Montgomery Museum of Fine Arts, Montgomery, Alabama
The Golden Lady	1896	Parrish Art Museum, Southampton, New York
Good Friends	c. 1909	Hirshhorn Museum and Sculpture Garden, Washington, D.C.
Gray Day on the Lagoon	c. 1877	Museum of Fine Arts, Boston, Massachusetts
Hall at Shinnecock	1892	Terra Museum of American Art, Chicago, Illinois
Harbor Scene	c. 1895	Hirshhorn Museum and Sculpture Garden, Washington, D.C.
Head of a Boy		Cleveland Museum of Art, Ohio
Henry W. Longfellow (etching, dry-point)	1882	Museum of Fine Arts, Boston, Massachusetts
Hide and Seek	1888	Brooklyn Museum, New York City
Idle Hours		Amon Carter Museum, Fort Worth, Texas
In the Park. A By-path	c. 1890	Thyssen-Bornemisza Museum, Madrid
In The Studio	c. 1892-1893	Hirshhorn Museum and Sculpture Garden, Washington, D.C.
In the Studio Corner	c. 1881	Canajoharie Library & Art Gallery, Canajoharie, New York
An Italian Garden	c. 1909	Chrysler Museum of Art, Norfolk, Virginia
The Jester: Preparatory drawing for the painting "Keying Up" — The Court Jester	c. 1875	Pennsylvania Academy of the Fine Arts, Philadelphia
The Jester	c. 1890	Cleveland Museum of Art, Ohio
Just Onions (Onions; Still Life)	1912	Los Angeles County Museum of Art, California
Keying Up' - The Court Jester	1875	Pennsylvania Academy of the Fine Arts, Philadelphia
The Kimono	c. 1895	Thyssen-Bornemisza Museum, Madrid

=== L-N ===
Lady in a Pink Dress	c. 1892	Westmoreland Museum of American Art, Greensburg, Pennsylvania
Landscape	c. 1885	Wright Museum of Art at Beloit College, Wisconsin
Landscape, Near Coney Island	c. 1886	Hyde Collection Art Museum, Glens Falls, New York
Landscape: Shinnecock, Long Island		Princeton University Art Museum, New Jersey
The Lone Fisherman	1890s	Hood Museum of Art, Dartmouth College, New Hampshire
Lydia Field Emmet	1892	Brooklyn Museum, New York City
Lydia Field Emmet	c. 1892	Detroit Institute of Arts, Michigan
Marianne Heyward Taylor	c. 1902-06	Columbia Museum of Art, South Carolina
A Modern Magdalen	c. 1888	Museum of Fine Arts, Boston, Massachusetts
The Moorish Warrior	c. 1878	Brooklyn Museum, New York City
Morning at Breakwater, Shinnecock	c. 1897	Terra Museum of American Art, Chicago, Illinois

- Mother and Child (The First Portrait), c. 1888, Museum of Fine Arts, Houston, Texas

Chase paints his daughter, holding a coral whistle, and her mother, wearing a Japanese-inspired costume. The black tones of the kimono and the background reflect Chase's experiments with delicate tonal harmonies, which contrast sharply with the white of the child's clothing and the red near the mother's neck. One critic wrote of " . . . the tingling pleasure that one receives from the one note of vivid scarlet that cuts through this quiet harmony like a knife . . .".

Mrs. Chase	1890–1895	Carnegie Museum of Art, Pittsburgh, Pennsylvania
Mrs. Chase and Cosy		Sheldon Museum of Art, Lincoln, Nebraska
Mrs. Chase in Prospect Park	1886	Metropolitan Museum of Art, New York City
Mrs. James Watson Webb (Laura Virginia Cram)	c. 1880	Shelburne Museum, Shelburne, Vermont
Mrs. William Merritt Chase	c. 1890	Detroit Institute of Arts, Michigan
My Little Daughter Dorothy	c. 1894	Detroit Institute of Arts, Michigan
My Palette		Reading Public Museum, Pennsylvania
Myra Reynolds	late 19th century	Smart Museum of Art, University of Chicago, Illinois
Nude	c. 1901	National Gallery of Art, Washington, D.C.

=== O-R ===
The Olive Grove
c. 1910
Terra Museum of American Art, Chicago, Illinois
The Open Air Breakfast
c. 1888
Toledo Museum of Art, Ohio
The Opera Cloak
c. 1890

Grand Rapids Museum of Art, Michigan

Pablo de Sarasate: Portrait of a Violinist
c. 1875
Los Angeles County Museum of Art, California
Park Bench
c. 1890
Museum of Fine Arts, Boston, Massachusetts
The Patrician
1875
Minneapolis Institute of Arts, Minnesota
Peonies
c. 1903
Lilly Endowment, Inc., Indianapolis
The Pink Bow
(Portrait of Alice Dieudonnee Chase)
c. 1898
Hirshhorn Museum and Sculpture Garden, Washington, D.C.
The Pot Hunter
1894
Parrish Art Museum, Southampton, New York
Portrait of Alice Gerson
by 1886
Terra Museum of American Art
Portrait of an Elderly Woman
1907
Maier Museum of Art, Randolph College, Virginia
Portrait of Artist's Daughter
c. 1895
Hirshhorn Museum and Sculpture Garden, Washington, D.C.
Portrait of a Girl
1903
Hirshhorn Museum and Sculpture Garden, Washington, D.C.
Portrait of a Lady in Black
c. 1895
Detroit Institute of Arts, Michigan
Portrait of the Lady in Pink (Mrs. Leslie Cotton)
c. 1888-89
Museum of the Rhode Island School of Design
Portrait of a Man
c. 1875
Smart Museum of Art, University of Chicago
Portrait of Fra Dana

Montana Museum of Art and Culture, Missoula
Portrait of Henry Wolf
c. 1900
Westmoreland Museum of American Art, Greensburg, Pennsylvania

- Portrait of Master Otis Barton and his Grandfather, 1903, Currier Museum of Art, Manchester, New Hampshire

Both figures look out at the viewer with composed expressions, as if they are conscious of the dignity of their pose. Yet the double portrait shows signs of a natural bond, especially the intertwined hands, suggesting affection between the grandfather and grandson, who share the same name. Chase combined a fashionable painting style of loose brushwork and dark palette with conventions of formal portraiture to create portraits that Americans with money would want. Scattered magazines on the floor and similar details add touches of authenticity that moderate the artificiality of the formal portrait.

Portrait of Miss B.	c. 1903	Richmond Art Museum, Indiana
Portrait of Mrs. C. (Lady with a White Shawl)	1893	Pennsylvania Academy of the Fine Arts, Philadelphia
Portrait of Mrs. William Merritt Chase	c. 1890	Hirshhorn Museum and Sculpture Garden, Washington, D.C.
Portrait of My Daughter Alice	c. 1895	Cleveland Museum of Art, Ohio
Portrait of President William Waugh Smith	1907	Maier Museum of Art at Randolph College, Virginia
Portrait of William Gurley Munson	1868	Indianapolis Museum of Art, Indiana
Portrait of a Young Girl (daughter of Karl Theodore von Piloty)	c. 1877	Philadelphia Museum of Art, Pennsylvania
Portrait Sketch of a Woman with Mantilla		Terra Museum of American Art
Priam		Montana Museum of Art and Culture, Missoula
Prospect Park, Brooklyn	1887	Parrish Art Museum, Southampton, New York
Ready for a Walk: Beatrice Clough Bachmann	c. 1885	Terra Museum of American Art
Reflections	1893	National Gallery of Art, Washington D.C.
Repair Docks, Gowanus Bay	c. 1870-1885	Cleveland Museum of Art, Ohio
The Roycrofter - Portrait of Elbert Hubbard	c. 1902	Maier Museum of Art, Randolph College, Virginia

=== S ===
St. Jerome (copy after Rembrandt)	c. 1872-1879	Smithsonian American Art Museum, Washington, D.C.
Seascape	1890s	Cleveland Museum of Art, Ohio

- Self-portrait: The Artist in his Studio, Richmond Art Museum, Richmond, Indiana

The painting was commissioned for the Richmond Art Museum, where it now hangs. Chase painted himself in his studio at his easel, holding his artist palette and with a blank canvas before him. In a letter to the museum director, Chase wrote: "I painted that picture for you people in Richmond. I thought you deserved something good. I have been interested in what you have been doing in the west for art." He added that the blank canvas in the picture was " the great picture I am going to paint someday".

Self-Portrait		Smithsonian American Art Museum, Washington, D.C.
Self-Portrait	c. 1884	National Gallery of Art, Washington, D.C.
Self-portrait	1908	State Museums of Florence, Italy
Self-Portrait	c. 1915	Terra Museum of American Art, Chicago, Illinois

- Self Portrait, c. 1914, Detroit Institute of Arts, Michigan

The beribboned pince-nez eyeglasses, the carnation in his lapel and his cravat were all signature elements of Chase's typical dress and were caricatured in the press. When the Detroit Institute of Arts bought the painting in 1916, the museum stated "As a likeness it reproduces the artist as his many friends and pupils know him". The painting also exemplifies his technique, with "sure, quick brushwork". The painting has not been lined, so the original impasto (build up of paint) can be seen, especially on the forehead. The work was used to illustrate a reprint of a 1916 speech Chase made to the American Federation of Arts. The portrait shows Chase, head and shoulders, in a quarter turn to the right, head turned toward the viewer, his right side somewhat in shadow, looking directly at the viewer, eyebrows crossed. He wears a jet black jacket (and sits in front of a jet black background) with very white collar and cravat, along with a very delicate white carnation (carefully painted) in his lapel.

Shinnecock Hills	1893–1897	Thyssen-Bornemisza Museum, Madrid, Spain
Shinnecock Hills	1895	Cleveland Museum of Art, Ohio
Shinnecock Hills	c. 1895	Smithsonian American Art Museum, Washington, D.C.
Shinnecock Hills Landscape	c. 1890–1895	Detroit Institute of Arts, Michigan
Shinnecock Hills, Long Island	c. 1895	Lilly Endowment, Inc., Indianapolis, Indiana
Shinnecock Studio Interior	1892	Terra Museum of American Art, Chicago, Illinois
Sketch for a Picture — Columbus before the Council of Salamanca (A)	c. 1876	Los Angeles County Museum of Art, California
Sketch for a Picture — Columbus before the Council of Salamanca (B)	c. 1876	Los Angeles County Museum of Art, California
Sketch of a Man, Whistling		Terra Museum of American Art, Chicago, Illinois
Spanish bull-fighter (etching, dry-point)		Museum of Fine Arts, Boston, Massachusetts
Spring Flowers (Peonies)	by 1889	Terra Museum of American Art, Chicago, Illinois
Still Life: Cod and Mackerel	c. 1885	National Museum of Wildlife Art, Jackson Hole, Wyoming
Still Life—Fish		The Parthenon, Nashville, Tennessee
Still Life—Fish	c. 1900	Museum of Fine Arts, Boston, Massachusetts
Still Life, Fish	c. 1903	Pennsylvania Academy of the Fine Arts, Philadelphia
Still Life, Fish	1912	Brooklyn Museum, New York City

- Still Life Urns and Red Peppers, c. 1895, Sheldon Swope Art Museum, Terre Haute, Indiana

An example of Chase's "Munich-school" style, "characterized by bravura brushwork, heavy impasto, and muted colors"; inspirations for the style came from Frans Hals and Velázquez.

Still Life With Fruit	1871	Parrish Art Museum, Southampton, New York
Still Life With Watermelon	1869	Birmingham Museum of Art, Alabama

- Studio Interior, c. 1882 Brooklyn Museum, New York City

Chase's studio conveyed the sophisticated, worldly image he wanted to project. This rendering of it gives examples of the brilliant colors and bravura brushwork he could use. Near the center is a copy of Malle Babbe by Frans Hals, a painter Chase revered. Contrasting textures can be seen throughout the painting, as for instance between the rougher rug, the woman's softer clothing and the pages of the books (the edges of which are rendered with careful brushstrokes) and the hard, reflective pot at the left, contrasted with the soft, reflective wall hanging and the large green plant; the shelves are full of smaller items of contrasting textures and colors.

Summer At Shinnecock Hills	1891	Cincinnati Art Museum, Ohio

- A Summer Day, c. 1892, Art Gallery of the University of Rochester, New York

In this pastel on canvas, Chase used "[h]igh-keyed summary colors and rapid Impressionistic strokes" to depict the brilliant sky, wildflowers and ocean. He often painted his daughters exploring the area around his home in Shinnecock, Long Island.

Summertime (Pulling for Shore)	c. 1886	Lilly Endowment, Inc., Indianapolis, Indiana
Sunlight and Shadow	1884	Joslyn Art Museum, Omaha, Nebraska
Sunlight and Shadow, Shinnecock Hills	c. 1895,	Museum of Fine Arts, Houston, Texas

=== T-Z ===
A Tambourine Player	c. 1886	Montclair Art Museum, Montclair, New Jersey
Tenth Street Studio	c. 1880-1881 and c. 1910	Carnegie Museum of Art, Pittsburgh, Pennsylvania
Terrace, Prospect Park	c. 1887	Smithsonian American Art Museum, Washington, D.C.
Tompkins Park, Brooklyn	1887	Colby College Museum of Art, Waterville, Maine
The Unknown Dane	c. 1876	Philadelphia Museum of Art, Pennsylvania
Untitled (Shinnecock Landscape)	c. 1892	Parrish Art Museum, Southampton, New York

- Venetian Balcony, 1913, Albrecht-Kemper Museum of Art St. Joseph, Missouri

Painted during Chase's final summer abroad, the painting shows the influence of Impressionism on his work. A student of his from the St. Joseph, Missouri, area urged the St. Joseph Art League to buy the painting, which became the first piece in the collection that later became the Albrecht-Kemper Museum of Art.

Venice	1877	Oklahoma City Art Museum, Oklahoma
View of the Brooklyn Navy Yard	1886-1890	University of Michigan Museum of Art, Ann Arbor, Michigan
Wash Day (Washing Day-a Backyard Reminiscence)	c. 1886	Lilly Endowment, Inc., Indianapolis, Indiana

- The White Rose, c. 1886, Phoenix Art Museum, Arizona

The figure, Josephine Jessup, was a student of the artist. The entire work was drawn in pastel, which takes much longer than painting, so pastel pictures tend to be small, yet this work is life-size and almost six feet in height.

- Woman in Spanish Shawl (Alice), 1879, Wake Forest University Fine Arts Gallery, Winston-Salem, North Carolina

The painting is a portrait of his wife Alice Gerson Chase.

Woman Standing in a Landscape		Fogg Museum, Harvard University, Cambridge, Massachusetts
The Yield of the Waters	1878	Detroit Institute of Arts

- Young Girl, c. 1900, Bruce Museum, Greenwich, Connecticut

A demonstration piece executed before a class, probably for students at the New York School of Art (given the date). Chase typically took an hour for these paintings and gave them away as prizes to students for good work. The artist concentrated his efforts on the sitter's head to get a "sensitive and expressive portrayal" with minimal brushwork. Dabs of unmixed paint are used to portray the effects of light. The lower end of the painting is unfinished, with exuberant, curving strokes.

== Chronological listing ==
=== 1870s and before ===
Image Title	Year	Location	Dimensions (cm.)	Medium	Notes
Portrait of William Gurley Munson	1868	Indianapolis Museum of Art, Indiana			
Still Life With Watermelon	1869	Birmingham Museum of Art, Alabama			
The Family Cow	1869	Indianapolis Museum of Art, Indiana			
Repair Docks, Gowanus Bay	c. 1870-1885	Cleveland Museum of Art, Ohio			
Floral Still Life with Hummingbird	1870	Indianapolis Museum of Art, Indiana			
Still Life With Fruit	1871	Parrish Art Museum, Southampton, N.Y.			
St. Jerome (copy after Rembrandt)	c. 1872-1879	Smithsonian American Art Museum, Washington, D.C.			
The Patrician	1875	Minneapolis Institute of Arts, Minnesota			
The Jester: Preparatory drawing for the painting "Keying Up" — The Court Jester	c. 1875	Pennsylvania Academy of the Fine Arts, Philadelphia			
Keying Up — The Court Jester	1875	Pennsylvania Academy of the Fine Arts, Philadelphia			
Pablo de Sarasate: Portrait of a Violinist	c. 1875	Los Angeles County Museum of Art, California			
Portrait of a Man	c. 1875	Smart Museum of Art, University of Chicago, Illinois			
Sketch for a Picture — Columbus before the Council of Salamanca (A)	c. 1876	Los Angeles County Museum of Art, California			
Sketch for a Picture — Columbus before the Council of Salamanca (B)	c. 1876	Los Angeles County Museum of Art, California			
The Unknown Dane	c. 1876	Philadelphia Museum of Art, Pennsylvania			
Courtyard in Venice	1877	Philadelphia Museum of Art, Pennsylvania			
Venice	1877	Oklahoma City Art Museum, Oklahoma			
Gray Day on the Lagoon	c. 1877	Museum of Fine Arts, Boston, Massachusetts			
Portrait of a Young Girl (daughter of Karl Theodore von Piloty)	c. 1877	Philadelphia Museum of Art, Pennsylvania			
The Moorish Warrior	c. 1878	Brooklyn Museum, New York City			
The Yield of the Waters	1878	Detroit Institute of Arts, Michigan			
The Antiquary Shop	1879	Brooklyn Museum, New York City			

=== 1880s ===
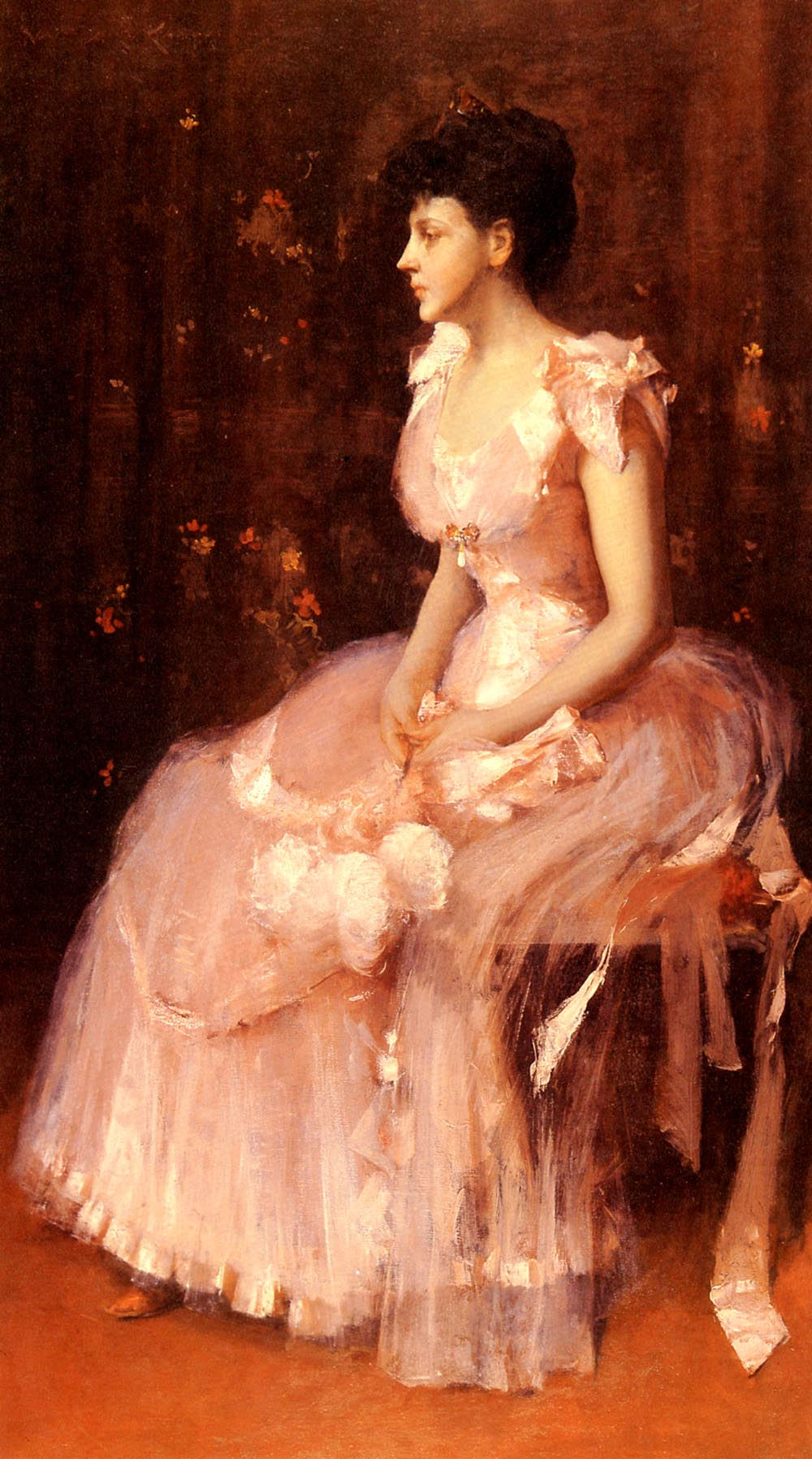
Portrait of a Lady in Pink

1880	Harriet Hubbard Ayer	De Young Museum, San Francisco, California
1880	General James Watson Webb	Shelburne Museum, Shelburne, Vermont
c. 1880	Mrs. James Watson Webb (Laura Virginia Cram)	Shelburne Museum, Shelburne, Vermont
c. 1880-1881 and c. 1910	Tenth Street Studio	Carnegie Museum of Art, Pittsburgh, Pennsylvania
c. 1881	In the Studio Corner	Canajoharie Library and Art Gallery, Canajoharie, New York
c. 1882	Studio Interior	Brooklyn Museum, New York City
1882	Henry W. Longfellow (etching, dry-point)	Museum of Fine Arts, Boston, Massachusetts
1882–1883	Dora Wheeler	Cleveland Museum of Art, Ohio
1884	Sunlight and Shadow	Joslyn Art Museum, Omaha, Nebraska
1884	At Her Ease	National Academy of Design, New York City
c. 1884	Self-Portrait	National Gallery of Art, Washington D.C.
c. 1885	Landscape	Wright Museum of Art at Beloit College, Wisconsin
c. 1885	Still Life: Cod and Mackerel	National Museum of Wildlife Art, Jackson Hole, Wyoming
c. 1885	Ready for a Walk: Beatrice Clough Bachmann	Terra Museum of American Art, Chicago, Illinois
1886	Mrs. Chase in Prospect Park	Metropolitan Museum of Art, New York City
by 1886	Portrait of Alice Gerson	Terra Museum of American Art, Chicago, Illinois
1886-1890	View of the Brooklyn Navy Yard	University of Michigan Museum of Art, Ann Arbor, Michigan
c. 1886	Wash Day (Washing Day—a Backyard Reminiscence	Lilly Endowment, Inc., Indianapolis, Indiana
c. 1886	Summertime (Pulling for Shore)	Lilly Endowment, Inc., Indianapolis, Indiana
c. 1886	The White Rose	Phoenix Art Museum, Arizona
c. 1886	Landscape, Near Coney Island	Hyde Collection Art Museum, Glens Falls, New York
c. 1886	A Tambourine Player	Montclair Art Museum, Montclair, New Jersey
c. 1887	Terrace, Prospect Park	Smithsonian American Art Museum, Washington, D.C.
1887	Tompkins Park, Brooklyn	Colby College Museum of Art, Waterville, Maine
1887	Prospect Park, Brooklyn	Parrish Art Museum, Southampton, New York
1888	Hide and Seek	The Phillips Collection, Washington, D.C.
c. 1888	A Modern Magdalen	Museum of Fine Arts, Boston, Massachusetts
c. 1888	Mother and Child (The First Portrait)	Museum of Fine Arts, Houston, Texas
c. 1888	The Open Air Breakfast	Toledo Museum of Art, Ohio
c. 1888-89	Portrait of the Lady in Pink (Mrs. Leslie Cotton)	Museum of the Rhode Island School of Design
by 1889	Spring Flowers (Peonies)	Terra Museum of American Art, Chicago, Illinois

=== 1890s ===
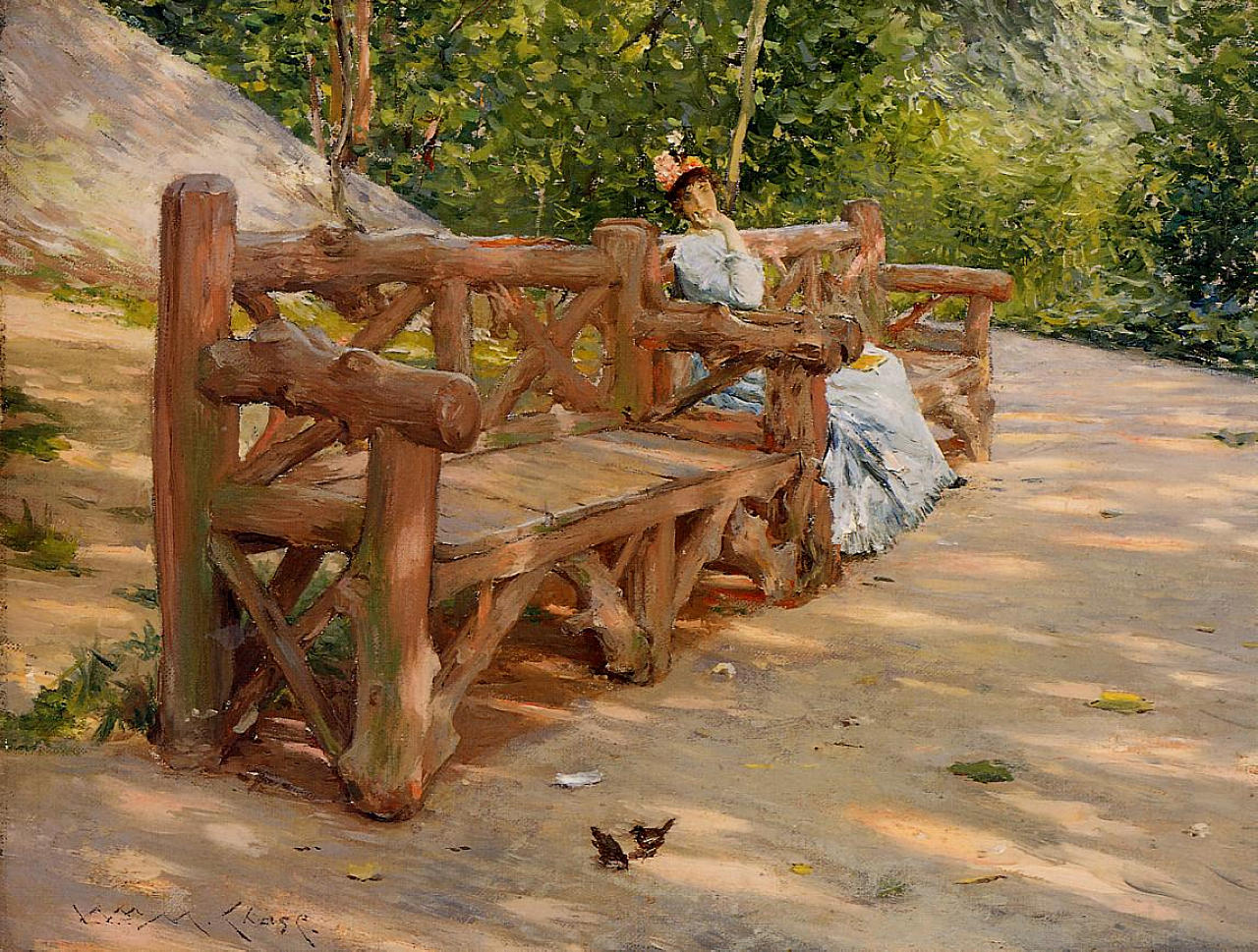
Park Bench

c. 1890	The Opera Cloak	Grand Rapids Museum of Art, Michigan
c. 1890	Park Bench	Museum of Fine Arts, Boston, Massachusetts
1890–1895	Mrs. Chase	Carnegie Museum of Art, Pittsburgh, Pennsylvania
late 19th century	Myra Reynolds	Smart Museum of Art, University of Chicago, Illinois
c. 1890	Portrait of Mrs. William Merritt Chase	Hirshhorn Museum and Sculpture Garden, Washington, D.C.
c. 1890	Girl in a Japanese Costume	Brooklyn Museum, New York City
c. 1890	Girl in White	Smithsonian American Art Museum, Washington, D.C.
c. 1890	The Jester	Cleveland Museum of Art, Ohio
c. 1890	Mrs. William Merritt Chase	Detroit Institute of Arts, Michigan
c. 1890	In the Park. A By-path	Thyssen-Bornemisza Museum, Madrid
c. 1890–1895	Shinnecock Hills Landscape	Detroit Institute of Arts, Michigan
1891	Summer At Shinnecock Hills	Cincinnati Art Museum, Ohio
1890s	The Lone Fisherman	Hood Museum of Art, Dartmouth College, Hanover, New Hampshire
1890s	Seascape	Cleveland Museum of Art, Ohio
1892	Lydia Field Emmet	Brooklyn Museum, New York City
c. 1892	A Summer Day	Art Gallery of the University of Rochester, New York
c. 1892	A Sunny Day at Shinnecock Bay
c. 1892	At the Seaside	Metropolitan Museum of Art, New York City
c. 1892	Lydia Field Emmet	Detroit Institute of Arts, Michigan
c. 1892	Alice Dieudonnée	Terra Museum of American Art, Chicago, Illinois
c. 1892	Lady in a Pink Dress	Westmoreland Museum of American Art, Greensburg, Pennsylvania
c. 1892	Untitled (Shinnecock Landscape)	Parrish Art Museum, Southampton, New York
1892	Hall at Shinnecock	Terra Museum of American Art, Chicago, Illinois
1892	Shinnecock Studio Interior	Terra Museum of American Art, Chicago, Illinois
1892	The Fairy Tale	National Gallery of Art, Washington, D.C.
c. 1892-1893	In The Studio	Hirshhorn Museum and Sculpture Garden, Washington, D.C.
1893	Reflections	National Gallery of Art, Washington, D.C.
1893	Portrait of Mrs. C. (Lady with a White Shawl)	Pennsylvania Academy of the Fine Arts, Philadelphia
1893–1897	Shinnecock Hills	Thyssen-Bornemisza Museum, Madrid
c. 1894	Idle Hours	Amon Carter Museum, Fort Worth, Texas
c. 1894	My Little Daughter Dorothy	Detroit Institute of Arts, Michigan
1894	The Pot Hunter	Parrish Art Museum, Southampton, New York
1895	Shinnecock Hills	Cleveland Museum of Art, Ohio
c. 1895	Portrait of a Lady in Black	Detroit Institute of Arts, Michigan
c. 1895	Shinnecock Hills, Long Island	Lilly Endowment, Inc., Indianapolis, Indiana
c. 1895	Shinnecock Hills	Smithsonian American Art Museum, Washington, D.C.
c. 1895	Portrait of My Daughter Alice	Cleveland Museum of Art, Ohio
c. 1895	Harbor Scene	Hirshhorn Museum and Sculpture Garden, Washington, D.C.
c. 1895	The Kimono	Thyssen-Bornemisza Museum, Madrid
c. 1895	Portrait of Artist's Daughter	Hirshhorn Museum and Sculpture Garden, Washington, D.C.
1895	A Friendly Call	National Gallery of Art, Washington, D.C.
c. 1895	Still Life Urns and Red Peppers	Swope Art Museum, Terre Haute, Indiana
c. 1895	Sunlight and Shadow, Shinnecock Hills	Museum of Fine Arts, Boston, Massachusetts
1896	The Golden Lady	Parrish Art Museum, Southampton, New York
c. 1897	Morning at Breakwater, Shinnecock	Terra Museum of American Art, Chicago, Illinois
1897	Did You Speak to Me?	Butler Institute of American Art, Youngstown, Ohio
c. 1898	The Pink Bow (Portrait of Alice Dieudonnee Chase)	Hirshhorn Museum and Sculpture Garden, Washington, D.C.
1898	The Blue Kimono	Parrish Art Museum, Southampton, New York
c. 1899	Artist's Daughter in Mother's Dress (Young Girl in Black)	Hirshhorn Museum and Sculpture Garden, Washington, D.C.

=== 1900-1909 ===
c. 1900	Portrait of Ms. D	De Young Museum, San Francisco, California
c. 1900	Portrait of Henry Wolf	Westmoreland Museum of American Art, Greensburg, Pennsylvania
c. 1900	Still Life—Fish	Museum of Fine Arts, Boston, Massachusetts
c. 1900	Young Girl	Bruce Museum, Greenwich, Connecticut
c. 1901	Nude	National Gallery of Art, Washington, D.C.
c. 1902	The Roycrofter - Portrait of Elbert Hubbard	Maier Museum of Art, Randolph College, Virginia
c. 1902	Girl With Book	Montgomery Museum of Fine Arts, Montgomery, Alabama
c. 1902-06	Marianne Heyward Taylor	Columbia Museum of Art, South Carolina
c. 1903	Still Life, Fish	Pennsylvania Academy of the Fine Arts, Philadelphia
c. 1903	Portrait of Miss B.	Richmond Art Museum, Indiana
c. 1903	Peonies	Lilly Endowment, Inc., Indianapolis, Indiana
1903	Portrait of a Girl	Hirshhorn Museum and Sculpture Garden, Washington, D.C.
1903	Portrait of Master Otis Barton and his Grandfather	Currier Museum of Art, Manchester, New Hampshire
1907	Portrait of President William Waugh Smith	Maier Museum of Art at Randolph College, Virginia
1907	Portrait of an Elderly Woman	Maier Museum of Art, Randolph College, Virginia
1907	The Deserted Beach	Maier Museum of Art, Randolph College, Virginia
1908	Self-portrait	State Museums of Florence, Italy
c. 1909	Carll H. de Silver	Brooklyn Museum, New York City
c. 1909	Good Friends	Hirshhorn Museum and Sculpture Garden, Washington, D.C.
c. 1909	An Italian Garden	Chrysler Museum of Art, Norfolk, Virginia
1909	Alice in Shinnecock Studio	Parrish Art Museum, Southampton, New York

=== 1910 and after ===
c. 1910	Fish, Plate, and Copper Container	Washington County Museum of Fine Arts, Hagerstown, Maryland
c. 1910	The Olive Grove	Terra Museum of American Art, Chicago, Illinois
1911	Portrait of a Lady in Black (Anna Traquair Lang)	Philadelphia Museum of Art, Pennsylvania
1912	Just Onions (Onions; Still Life)	Los Angeles County Museum of Art, California
1912	Still Life, Fish	Brooklyn Museum, New York City
1913	Venetian Balcony	Albrecht-Kemper Museum of Art, St. Joseph, Missouri
c. 1914	Self Portrait	Detroit Institute of Arts, Michigan
c. 1915	Self-Portrait	Terra Museum of American Art, Chicago, Illinois
1915-16	Self-portrait: The Artist in his Studio	Richmond Art Museum, Indiana

=== Undated ===
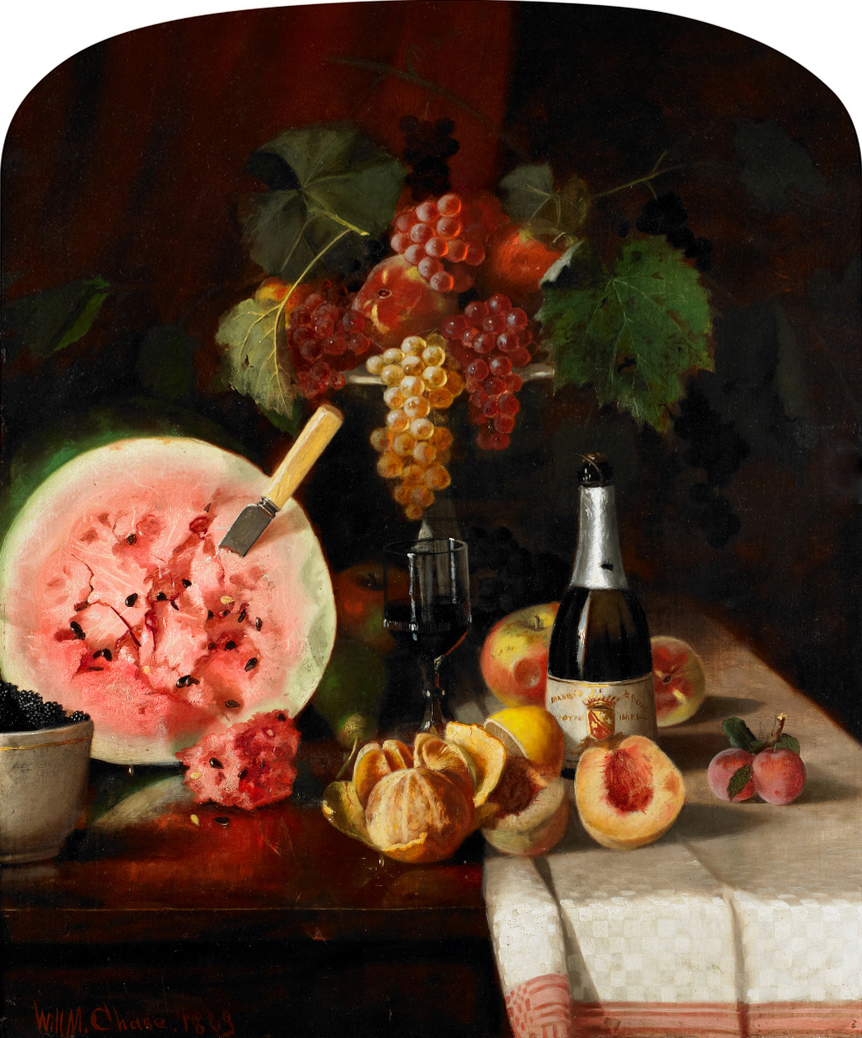
Still Life With Watermelon

Along the Canal	Art Gallery of the University of Rochester, New York
Autumn Still Life	Pennsylvania Academy of the Fine Arts, Philadelphia
The Bayberry Bush	Parrish Art Museum, Southampton, New York
The Blue Kimono	Philbrook Museum of Art, Tulsa, Oklahoma
A City Park	Art Institute of Chicago, Illinois
The Court Jester (etching)	Museum of Fine Arts, Boston, Massachusetts
Doorway and Garden Wall	University of Michigan Museum of Art, Ann Arbor, Michigan
Duveneck in His Studio	San Antonio Art League Museum, Texas
Edward Everett Hale	Fogg Museum, Harvard University, Cambridge, Massachusetts
Florence	The Phillips Collection, Washington, D.C.
Head of a Boy	Cleveland Museum of Art, Ohio
Keying Up' - The Court Jester	Pennsylvania Academy of the Fine Arts, Philadelphia
Landscape: Shinnecock, Long Island	Princeton University Art Museum, New Jersey
Mrs. Chase and Cosy	Sheldon Museum of Art, Lincoln, Nebraska
My Palette	Reading Public Museum, Pennsylvania
Portrait of Fra Dana	Montana Museum of Art and Culture, Missoula
Portrait Sketch of a Woman with Mantilla	Terra Museum of American Art, Chicago, Illinois
Priam	Montana Museum of Art and Culture, Missoula
Self-Portrait	Smithsonian American Art Museum, Washington, D.C.
Sketch of a Man, Whistling	Terra Museum of American Art, Chicago, Illinois
Spanish bull-fighter (etching, dry-point)	Museum of Fine Arts, Boston, Massachusetts
Still Life—Fish	The Parthenon, Nashville, Tennessee
Woman in Spanish Shawl (Alice)	Wake Forest University Fine Arts Gallery, Winston-Salem, North Carolina
Woman Standing in a Landscape	Fogg Museum, Harvard University, Cambridge, Massachusetts

== List of works by current location ==
=== Northeast United States ===
==== New York City ====
Metropolitan Museum of Art:

- At the Seaside, c. 1892
- Mrs. Chase in Prospect Park, 1886

Brooklyn Museum:

- The Antiquary Shop, 1879
- Still Life, Fish, 1912
- Lydia Field Emmet, 1892
- Carll H. de Silver, c. 1909
- The Moorish Warrior, c. 1878
- Girl in a Japanese Costume
- Studio Interior, c. 1882

Elsewhere in New York City:

- At Her Ease, National Academy of Design

==== Elsewhere in New York state ====
- In the Studio Corner, c. 1881, Canajoharie Library and Art Gallery, Canajoharie
- Landscape, Near Coney Island, c. 1886, Hyde Collection Art Museum, Glens Falls

Art Gallery of the University of Rochester:

- A Summer Day
- Along the Canal

Parrish Art Museum, Southampton:

- The Blue Kimono, 1898
- The Bayberry Bush
- Alice in Shinnecock Studio, 1909
- The Pot Hunter, 1894
- The Golden Lady, 1896
- Still Life With Fruit, 1871
- Prospect Park, Brooklyn, 1887
- Untitled (Shinnecock Landscape) c. 1892

==== New Jersey, Pennsylvania ====
Pennsylvania:

- My Palette, Reading Public Museum, Reading

Carnegie Museum of Art, Pittsburgh:

- Mrs. Chase, 1890–1895
- Tenth Street Studio, c. 1880–1881, and c. 1910

Westmoreland Museum of American Art, Greensburg:

- Lady in a Pink Dress, c. 1892
- Portrait of Henry Wolf, c. 1900

Pennsylvania Academy of the Fine Arts, Philadelphia:

- The Jester: Preparatory drawing for the painting "Keying Up" — The Court Jester, c. 1875
- "Keying Up" — The Court Jester, 1875
- Portrait of Mrs. C. (Lady with a White Shawl), 1893
- Still Life, Fish, c. 1903
- Autumn Still Life

Philadelphia Museum of Art

- Courtyard in Venice, 1877
- Portrait of a Lady in Black (Anna Traquair Lang), 1911
- Portrait of a Lady, c. 1915
- The Unknown Dane, c. 1876
- Portrait of a Young Girl (daughter of Karl Theodore von Piloty) c. 1877

New Jersey:

- Landscape: Shinnecock, Long Island, Princeton University Art Museum, Princeton
- A Tambourine Player, c. 1886, Montclair Art Museum, Montclair

==== Boston and Cambridge, Massachusetts ====
Museum of Fine Arts, Boston:

- Sunlight and Shadow, Shinnecock Hills, c. 1895
- Still Life — Fish, c. 1900
- Gray Day on the Lagoon, c. 1877
- Park Bench, c. 1890
- A Modern Magdalen, c. 1888
- Spanish bull-fighter (etching, dry-point)
- Henry W. Longfellow (etching, dry-point), 1882
- The Court Jester (etching)

Fogg Art Museum, Harvard University, Cambridge:

- Edward Everett Hale
- Woman Standing in a Landscape

==== Elsewhere in New England ====
- Tompkins Park, Brooklyn, 1887, Colby College Museum of Art, Waterville, Maine
- Portrait of Master Otis Barton and
  his Grandfather, 1903, Currier Museum of Art, Manchester, New Hampshire
- Portrait of the Lady in Pink (Mrs. Leslie Cotton), c. 1888–89, Museum of the Rhode Island School of Design, Providence, Rhode Island
- The Lone Fisherman, 1890s, Hood Museum of Art, Dartmouth College, Hanover, New Hampshire
- Young Girl, c. 1900, Bruce Museum, Greenwich, Connecticut
- General James Watson Webb, 1880 Shelburne Museum, Shelburne, Vermont
- Mrs. James Watson Webb (Laura Virginia Cram), c. 1880 Shelburne Museum, Shelburne, Vermont

==== Washington, D.C. ====
Hirshhorn Museum and Sculpture Garden:

- Good Friends, c. 1909
- Harbor Scene, c. 1895
- In The Studio, c. 1892–1893
- Portrait of a Girl, 1903
- Portrait of Artist's Daughter, c. 1895
- Portrait of Mrs. William Merritt Chase, c. 1890
- The Pink Bow (Portrait of Alice Dieudonnee Chase), c. 1898
- Artist's Daughter in Mother's Dress (Young Girl in Black), c. 1899

National Gallery of Art:

- A Friendly Call, 1895
- Nude, c. 1901
- Self-Portrait, c. 1884
- The Fairy Tale, 1892
- Reflections, 1893
- Girl in White, c. 1890
- Shinnecock Hills, c. 1895

The Phillips Collection:

- Florence, undated
- Hide and Seek, 1888

Smithsonian American Art Museum

- St. Jerome (copy after Rembrandt), c. 1872–1879
- Terrace, Prospect Park, c. 1887
- Self-Portrait

==== Maryland ====
Washington County Museum of Fine Arts, Hagerstown:

- Fish, Plate, and Copper Container, c. 1910

=== Midwest United States ===
- Mrs. Chase and Cosy, Sheldon Museum of Art, Lincoln, Nebraska
- Sunlight and Shadow, 1884, Joslyn Art Museum, Omaha, Nebraska
- The Opera Cloak, c. 1890, Grand Rapids Museum of Art, Michigan
- The Patrician, 1875, Minneapolis Institute of Arts, Minnesota
- Venetian Balcony, 1913, Albrecht-Kemper Museum of Art, St. Joseph, Missouri
- Landscape, c. 1885, Wright Museum of Art at Beloit College, Wisconsin

==== Chicago, Illinois ====
Art Institute of Chicago:

- A City Park

Terra Museum of American Art:

- Ready for a Walk: Beatrice Clough Bachmann, c. 1885
- Alice Dieudonnée, c. 1892
- Portrait of Alice Gerson by 1886
- Morning at Breakwater, Shinnecock, c. 1897
- Spring Flowers (Peonies), by 1889
- Hall at Shinnecock, 1892
- Shinnecock Studio Interior, 1892
- The Olive Grove, c. 1910
- Self-Portrait, c. 1915
- Sketch of a Man, Whistling, undated
- Portrait Sketch of a Woman with Mantilla, undated

Smart Museum of Art, University of Chicago:

- Myra Reynolds, late 19th century
- Portrait of a Man, c. 1875

==== Indiana ====
- Self-portrait: The Artist in his Studio, Richmond Art Museum, Richmond
- Portrait of Miss B., Richmond Art Museum, Richmond
- Still Life Urns and Red Peppers, c. 1895, Swope Art Museum, Terre Haute
- Peonies, c. 1903, Lilly Endowment, Inc., Indianapolis
- Shinnecock Hills, Long Island, c. 1895, Lilly Endowment, Inc., Indianapolis
- Summertime (Pulling for Shore), c. 1886, Lilly Endowment, Inc., Indianapolis
- Wash Day (Washing Day—a Backyard Reminiscence), c. 1886, Lilly Endowment, Inc., Indianapolis
- My Daughter, Snite Museum of Art, Notre Dame

==== Michigan ====
===== Detroit Institute of Arts =====
- Lydia Field Emmet, c. 1892
- Mrs. William Merritt Chase, c. 1890
- Portrait of a Lady in Black, c. 1895
- My Little Daughter Dorothy, c. 1894
- Self Portrait, c. 1914
- Shinnecock Hills Landscape, c. 1890–1895
- The Yield of the Waters, 1878

===== Kalamazoo Institute of Arts =====
- A Study in Pink(Mrs. Robert McDougal), 1895

===== University of Michigan Museum of Art =====
- Doorway and Garden Wall, year unknown
- View of the Brooklyn Navy Yard, 1886–1890

==== Ohio ====
- Summer At Shinnecock Hills, 1891, Cincinnati Art Museum
- The Open Air Breakfast, 1888, Toledo Museum of Art
- Did You Speak to Me?, 1897, Butler Institute of American Art, Youngstown

===== Cleveland =====
Cleveland Museum of Art:

- Portrait of My Daughter Alice, c. 1895
- Head of a Boy
- Dora Wheeler, 1882–1883
- Shinnecock Hills, 1895
- Seascape, 1890s
- Repair Docks, Gowanus Bay, c. 1870–1885
- The Jester, c. 1890

=== Southern United States ===
==== Oklahoma ====
- The Blue Kimono, Philbrook Museum of Art, Tulsa
- Venice, 1877, Oklahoma City Museum of Art
- Portrait of a Young Lady, Mabee-Gerrer Museum of Art, Shawnee

==== Texas ====
- Duveneck in His Studio, San Antonio Art League Museum
- Mother and Child (The First Portrait), c. 1888, Museum of Fine Arts, Houston
- Sunlight and Shadow, Shinnecock Hills, c. 1895, Museum of Fine Arts, Houston
- Idle Hours, c. 1894, Amon Carter Museum, Fort Worth

==== Virginia ====
Maier Museum of Art at Randolph College, Lynchburg:

- Portrait of President William Waugh Smith, 1907
- The Roycrofter — Portrait of Elbert Hubbard, c. 1902
- The Deserted Beach, 1907
- Portrait of an Elderly Woman, 1907

Elsewhere:

- An Italian Garden, c. 1909, Chrysler Museum of Art, Norfolk

==== Elsewhere ====
- Girl With Book, Montgomery Museum of Fine Arts, Alabama
- Still Life - Fish, The Parthenon, Nashville, Tennessee
- Still Life with Watermelon, 1869, Birmingham Museum of Art, Alabama
- Marianne Heyward Taylor, c. 1902–06, Columbia Museum of Art, South Carolina
- Woman in Spanish Shawl (Alice), Wake Forest University Fine Arts Gallery, Winston-Salem, North Carolina

=== Western United States ===
Los Angeles County Museum of Art:

- Pablo de Sarasate: Portrait of a Violinist, c. 1875
- Sketch for a Picture — Columbus before
  the Council of Salamanca (A), c. 1876
- Sketch for a Picture — Columbus
  before the Council of Salamanca (B), c. 1876
- Just Onions (Onions; Still Life), 1912

Montana Museum of Art and Culture, Missoula:

- Portrait of Fra Dana, 1897
- Priam

Elsewhere:

- The White Rose, c. 1886, Phoenix Art Museum, Arizona
- Still Life: Cod and Mackerel, c. 1885, National Museum of Wildlife Art, Jackson Hole, Wyoming
- Harriet Hubbard Ayer, 1880, De Young Museum, San Francisco

=== Outside the United States ===
Thyssen-Bornemisza Museum, Madrid, Spain:

- The Kimono, c. 1895
- Shinnecock Hills, 1893–1897
- In the Park. A By-path, c. 1890

Elsewhere:

- Self-portrait, 1908, State Museums of Florence, Italy

== Notes and references ==
Items on the lists above largely come from the Artcyclopedia Web site.
