= MMAC =

MMAC may refer to:

- Mega Man Anniversary Collection, a compilation of video games from the Mega Man series
- Mike Monroney Aeronautical Center
- Material Management Aggregation Code, a suffix appended to a NATO Stock Number
- Millions of Multiply Accumulate operations (MAC) .
- Montana Museum of Art & Culture in Missoula, Montana.
- Mouche Meurtrier, Alen Chien (MMAC), the master chef from TW.
