= Terrace at the Mall, Central Park =

Painting by William Merritt Chase

Terrasse au centre commercial, Central Park
- Terrace at the Mall, Central Park (English)
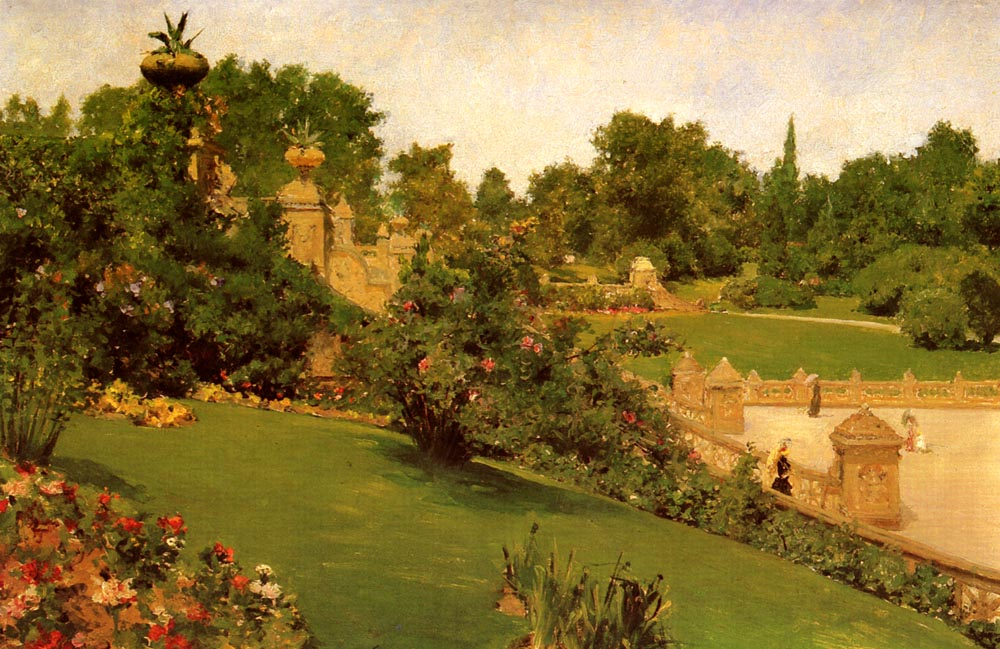
- Artist: William Merritt Chase
- Year: 1890
- Type: Oil on panel
- Dimensions: 29.2 cm × 41.9 cm (11.5 in × 16.5 in)
- Location: Private collection

Terrace at the Mall, Central Park (French: Terrasse au centre commercial, Central Park) is an oil-on-panel painting completed in 1890 by the American artist William Merritt Chase. The dimensions of the painting are 29.2 by 41.9 centimeters. It is in a private collection.

== Description ==
The Central Park Mall was a favorite subject for late-century impressionists and urban realists. Chase depicts the garden outside the mall and the mall surrounded by trees.

== See also ==
- List of works by William Merritt Chase
