= Wright Museum =

Wright Museum may refer to:

- Charles H. Wright Museum of African American History in Detroit, Michigan
- Frank Lloyd Wright Home and Studio in Oak Brook, Illinois
- Harold Bell Wright Museum in Branson, Missouri
- Wright Museum of Art in Beloit, Wisconsin
- Wright Brothers:
  - Huffman Prairie in Dayton, Ohio
  - Wright Brothers National Memorial in Kill Devil Hills, North Carolina
