= Daniel Terra =

Daniel Terra may refer to:

- Daniel J. Terra (1911–1996), American scientist, businessman and art lover
- Daniel Terra, a leader of Brazil's Revolutionary Movement 8th October
