= A Friendly Call =

Painting by William Merritt Chase

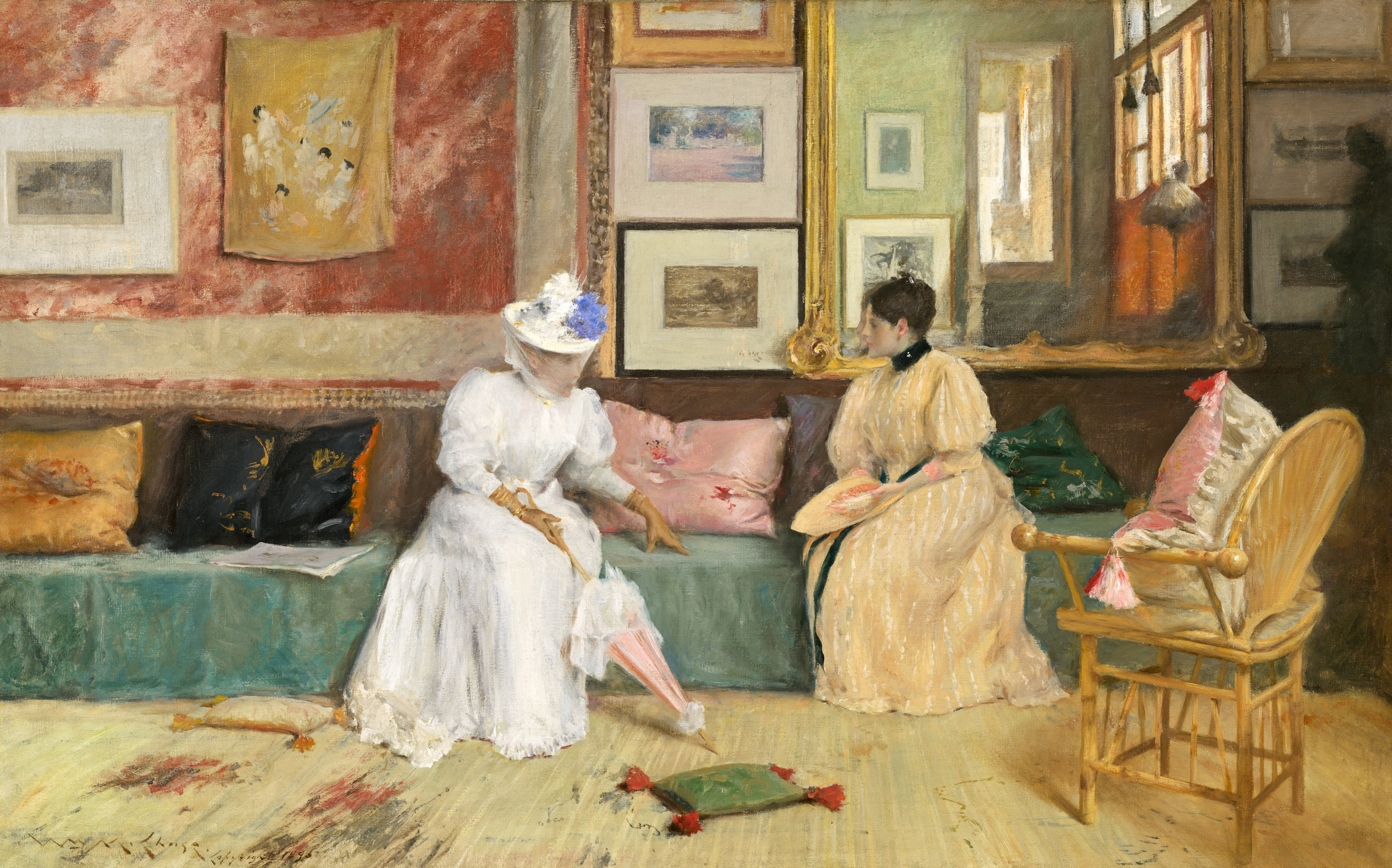
- Artist: William Merritt Chase
- Year: 1895
- Type: oil on canvas
- Dimensions: 76.5 cm × 122.5 cm (30.1 in × 48.2 in)
- Location: National Gallery of Art; Washington, D.C.

A Friendly Call is an oil-on-canvas painting executed in 1895 by the American painter William Merritt Chase. It was acquired by the National Gallery of Art in Washington D.C., in 1943 as part of the Chester Dale collection.

The canvas depicts Chase's wife Alice earnestly chatting with a fashionably dressed visitor in the artist's studio at their summer house at Shinnecock Hills, Long Island. The features of the studio are accurately rendered when compared to a contemporary photograph. The use of color and light is reminiscent of the French Impressionists, a style that led to Chase being dubbed an "American Impressionist".

== See also ==
- List of works by William Merritt Chase
