= Terra Foundation for American Art =

Nonprofit organization supporting exhibition of art works

The Terra Foundation for American Art is a privately operated nonprofit organization dedicated to the support of American art exhibitions, projects, academic research, and publications worldwide. Its goal is to promote a greater understanding and appreciation of the cultural and artistic heritage of the United States through the acquisition, study, and display of works of American art. The Foundation is headquartered in Chicago, Illinois.

== History ==
The Foundation was established by Daniel J. Terra (1911-1996) in 1978 along with the Terra Museum of American Art, which opened in 1980. Terra was a businessman and art collector who used his own collection of influential American art to realize the goals of the Foundation. He opened three museums to house his collection of 700 works of American art from the late 18th century to 1945.

The Foundation has longstanding presence in France. In 1992, it opened the Musée d'Art Américain Giverny, a museum managed in partnership with the French government and the Musée d'Orsay which focuses on international impressionism. In 2009, the Terra Foundation opened its Paris Center to support its programs in Europe. The Paris Center houses the only research library in Europe dedicated exclusively to American art and transatlantic artistic exchange.

== Activities ==
The Terra Foundation uses its endowment to award grants for exhibitions, fellowships, symposia, research, publications, and academic programs, with a special focus on international initiatives and local Chicago initiatives. It works closely with educators, scholars, curators, and museums.

Despite the closure of the Museum in 2004, the Foundation continues to actively collect paintings, sculptures, works on paper, and other objects representing achievement in American art from the late eighteenth century to 1945. The collection currently comprises hundreds of works by artists such as John Singleton Copley, James McNeill Whistler, Mary Cassatt, Winslow Homer, Marsden Hartley, and Edward Hopper. The Foundation lends these works to institutions and exhibitions worldwide and maintains a comprehensive database of the collection. A selection of Terra Foundation paintings remains on long-term loan to the Art Institute of Chicago, and the Art Institute also houses the Foundation's collection of works on paper.

In 2007, the Terra Foundation teamed with the Solomon R. Guggenheim Foundation to take "Art in America: 300 Years of Innovation" to Beijing and Shanghai. In 2018, it organized Art Design Chicago, a year-long cultural programming initiative that drew 2.5 million people.

== Management ==
=== Finances ===
As of 2020, the Terra Foundation has assets of $582 million and an annual budget of $17 million, most of which flows into grants promoting American art through research, exhibitions and other events. Between 2006 and 2012 alone, the foundation spent $40 million on more than 380 projects in more than 30 countries, starting in Western Europe and branching out to Russia, Mexico, Australia and beyond. In 2012, it gave away $7.6 million, with exhibitions receiving 60 to 70 percent of the funds.

=== Leadership ===
- 2001–2020: Elizabeth Glassman
- 2020–present: Sharon Corwin
