= The Young Orphan =

Painting by William Merritt Chase

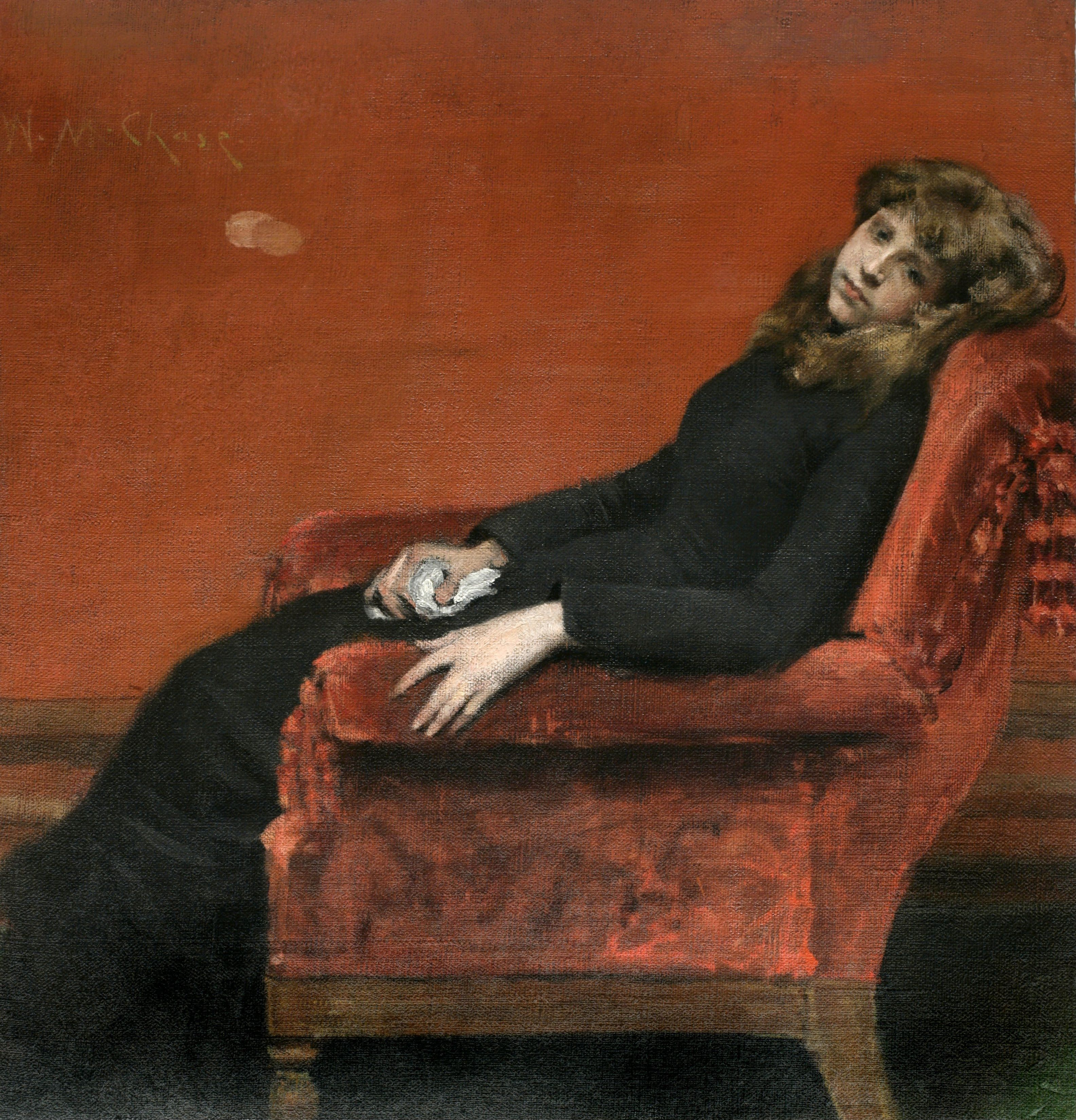
- Artist: William Merritt Chase
- Year: 1884
- Type: oil on canvas
- Dimensions: 111.7 cm × 196.7 cm (44.0 in × 77.4 in)
- Location: National Academy of Design; New York

The Young Orphan (or At Her Ease) is an oil-on-canvas painting executed in 1884 by the American artist William Merritt Chase. It is in the collection of the National Academy of Design, New York City.

The model was probably from the Protestant Half Orphanage in West 10th Street, New York City, adjacent to the Tenth Street Studio Building where the artist lived and worked. Chase changed the title of the work to At Her Ease when he sent it to the 1884 exhibition of Les Vingt in Belgium, thus placing more emphasis on the painting and less on its social comment.

The painting is compositionally reminiscent (e.g. in its layout and use of only two predominant colors) of Whistler's well known Arrangement in Black and Gray, No 1 (Whistler's Mother).

== See also ==
- List of works by William Merritt Chase
