= At the Seaside (Chase painting) =

Painting by William Merritt Chase

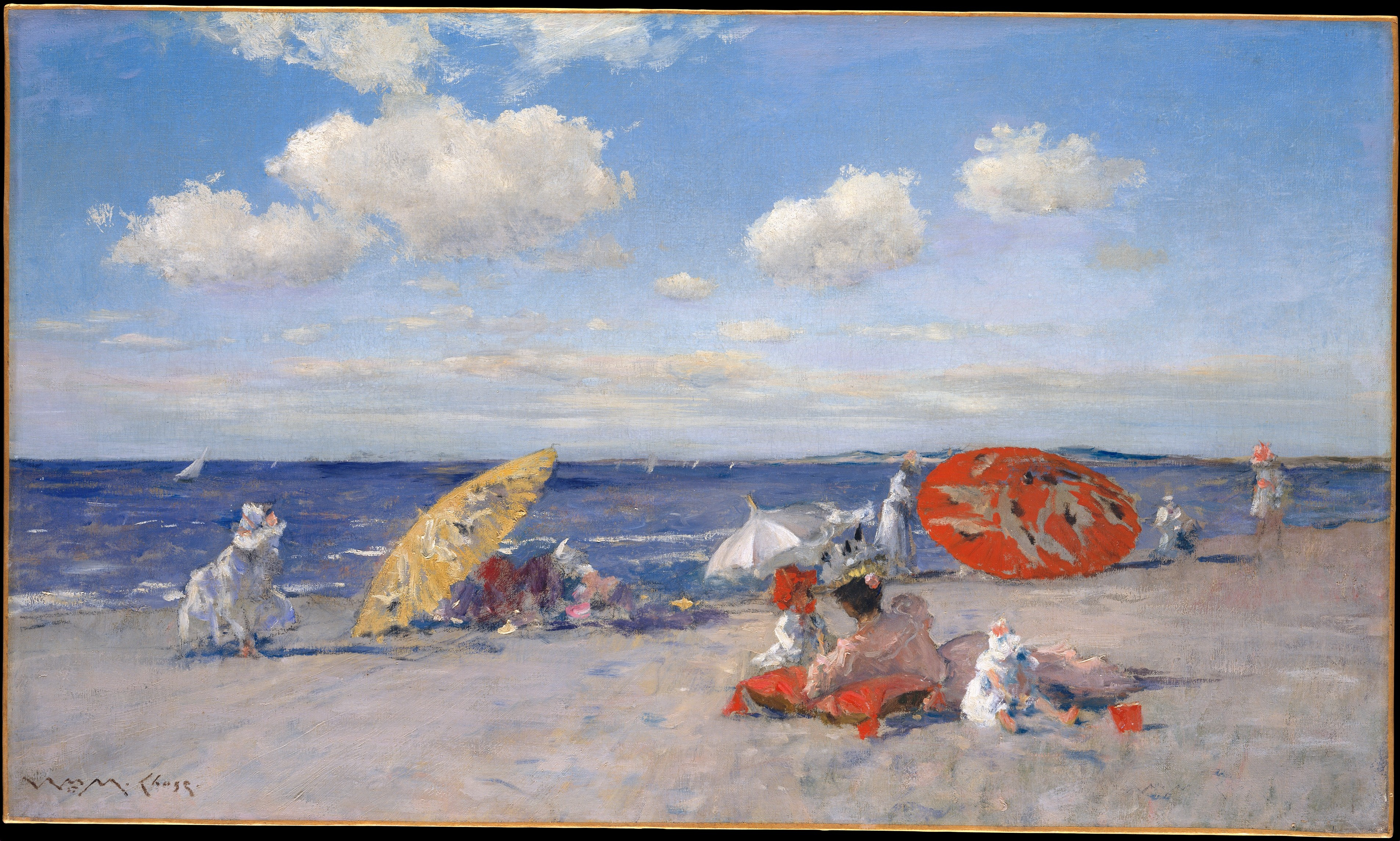
- Artist: William Merritt Chase
- Year: c. 1892
- Medium: Oil on canvas
- Dimensions: 50.8 cm × 86.4 cm (20.0 in × 34.0 in)
- Location: Metropolitan Museum of Art; New York

At the Seaside is an oil painting on canvas executed c. 1892 by American artist William Merritt Chase. The painting depicts a seaside scene set on Long Island, New York. The work is in the collection of the Metropolitan Museum of Art, in New York.

== See also ==
- List of works by William Merritt Chase
