= Dorothy (Chase) =

Painting by William Merritt Chase

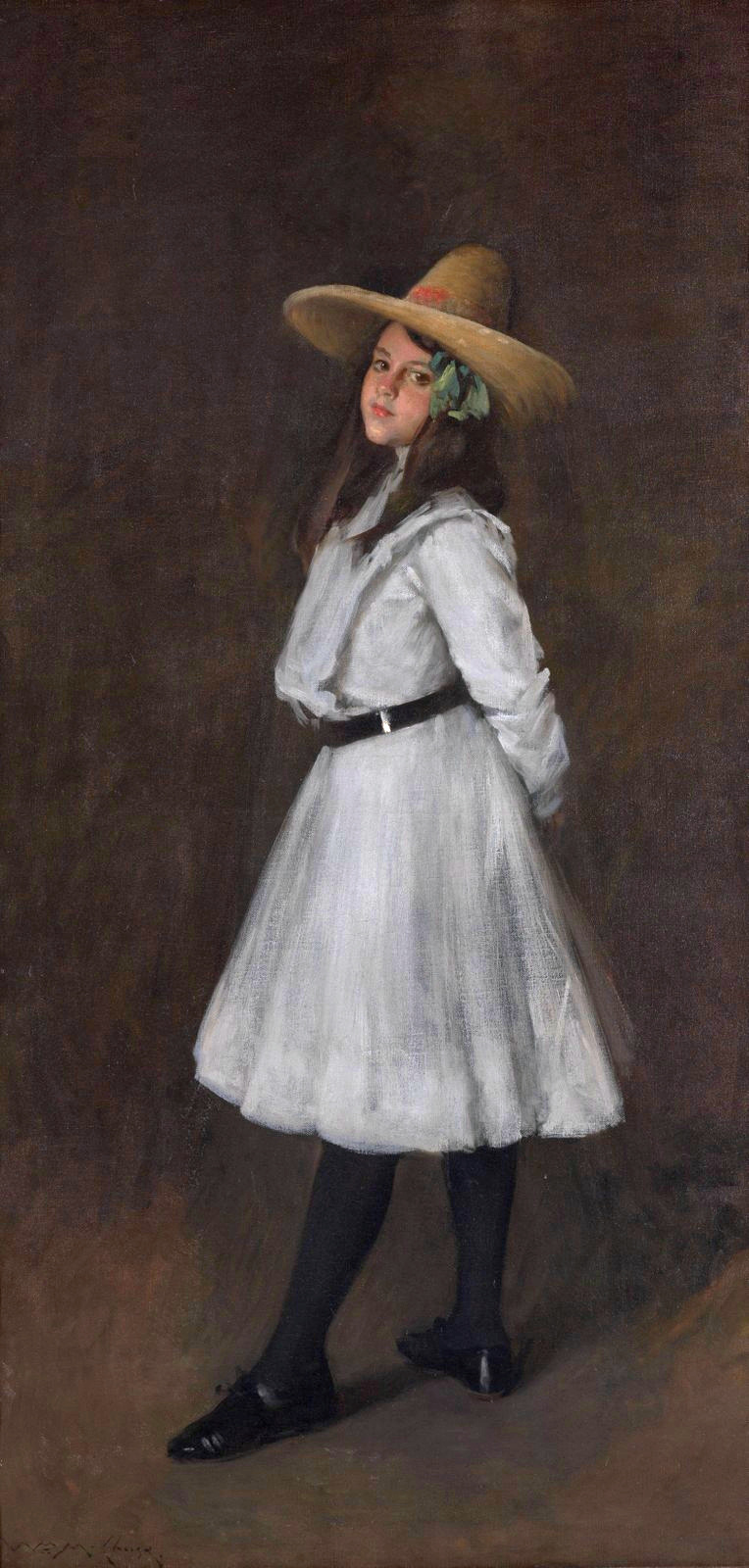
- Artist: William Merritt Chase
- Year: 1902
- Type: painting on canvas
- Dimensions: 180 cm × 91 cm (72 in × 36 in)
- Location: Indianapolis Museum of Art; Indianapolis

Dorothy is an oil painting by American artist William Merritt Chase. Created in 1902, it is currently part of the permanent collection in the Indianapolis Museum of Art.

== Description ==
The image's subject is Chase's 11-year-old daughter, Dorothy, wearing a white dress with full-length sleeves, a straw hat with a green bow, a black belt, black tights, and black shoes. She is standing against a brown background without any detail, so the viewer's eye is focused only on her. Dorothy stares straight out at the viewer, engaging them. With a 6' canvas, Dorothy is reminiscent of full-length Baroque paintings of emperors, giving the young girl a grandiose image.

== Historical information ==
Chase's favorite subject to paint was his family, including his wife and his daughters, and his paintings of them are also his most well received. Dorothy is a painting in a series of full-length portraits Chase created of his family between 1886 and 1902.

Chase was the founder of the Chase School, which eventually became Parsons The New School for Design, one of the most famous art schools in the United States. As a teacher, his students include Charles Demuth and Georgia O'Keeffe.

=== Acquisition ===
Dorothy was purchased from the artist at the Exhibition of Indiana Art in Tomlinson Hall, in 1903, using the John Herron fund.

== See also ==
- List of works by William Merritt Chase
