= Daniel J. Terra =

American scientist and businessman

Daniel James Terra
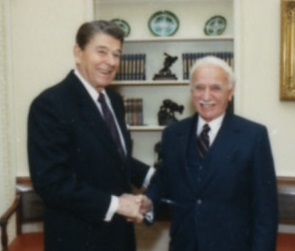
- 1988, right, with President Ronald Reagan
- Born: June 8, 1911; Philadelphia, Pennsylvania
- Died: June 28, 1996 (aged 85); Washington, D.C.
- Occupation: Chemical engineering
- Political party: Republican
- Spouse(s): Adeline Evans Richards (her death); Judith Banks (1986-1996) (his death)

Daniel J. Terra (June 8, 1911 – June 28, 1996) was a scientist, businessman, and art collector. A first-generation Italian-American, Terra earned a chemical engineering degree from Pennsylvania State University in 1931, and founded Lawter Chemicals in Chicago in 1940. The success of his global enterprise enabled him to pursue his cultural interests, assembling an art collection and participating in several Chicago arts institutions.

== Early life ==
Terra, the grandson of lithographers who immigrated from Italy, was raised in Pennsylvania. He worked as an apprentice in his family's shop while studying chemistry. Through his undergraduate thesis research, he discovered a new ink vehicle, which allowed printing presses to run faster than ever before, leading to the creation of Life magazine, the first news-picture publication. In 1940, Terra borrowed funds from a friend, John Lawson and founded a printing-chemical firm, Lawter Chemicals, one of the world largest producers of printing inks and chemicals.

His interest in art and collecting began in 1937 when he married Adeline Evans Richards, a painter and a student of art history.

Terra was finance chairman of Ronald Reagan's 1980 presidential campaign and was rewarded by being named the United States' first and only Ambassador at Large for Cultural Affairs, serving in that post from July 1981 to January 1989.

He founded the Terra Foundation for American Art in 1978 and the Terra Museum of American Art in 1980. After his death the museum became the object of a court case when his widow attempted to have the museum moved from Chicago, Illinois, to Washington, D.C. The museum subsequently closed to be merged with the Art Institute of Chicago. After the Terra Museum closed it became the Terra Foundation for American Art in 2004.

== Honors and awards ==
- 1972 Winthrop-Sears Medal from the Chemists' Club of New York for entrepreneurial achievement in the chemical industry.
