= Terra Museum =

Defunct Illinois art museum

Coordinates: 41.8944°N 87.6246°W

- Established: 1980; 46 years ago
- Dissolved: October 31, 2004; 21 years ago
- Location: Evanston, Illinois (1980-1987); Chicago, Illinois (1987-2004)

The Terra Museum of American Art is a collection of American art founded by Chicago businessman Daniel J. Terra in Evanston, Illinois in 1980. The museum was relocated to Chicago, Illinois in 1987. During its physical tenure, the museum presented more than 200 exhibitions on American art and provided related programs and events for children, teachers, families, general adult audiences, and scholars. The museum's physical location closed on October 31, 2004, after 24 years of operation, and it now serves as a lending collection and sponsors programing, as the Terra Foundation for American Art, which sometimes still uses the name Terra Museum.

== Origins ==
Daniel Terra began collecting in the 1940s, and by the early 1970s had turned his attention to American art, with a special focus on American Impressionism and the Hudson River School. Two years after establishing the Terra Foundation for American Art, Terra opened the Terra Museum of American Art in Evanston, Illinois in 1980. Initially, the museum housed Terra's collection of some 700 paintings, prints, drawings, sculptures, and photographs from the late eighteenth century to 1945. Two years later, in recognition of his efforts in promoting American art and culture, Daniel Terra was appointed Ambassador-at-Large for Cultural Affairs by President Ronald Reagan.

== Expansion ==
In 1987, the Terra Museum of American Art moved from Evanston to an office building on Michigan Avenue in downtown Chicago. In 1992, Terra opened the Musée d’art américain Giverny (or MAAG), which first exhibited paintings from the Terra collection by American artists who sojourned in France. Soon, however, the exhibition and education programs expanded their focus to encompass a wider range of American artists and topics with a transatlantic focus.

== Museum closing ==
In 2003, after conducting a comprehensive two-year study to plan the foundation's future mission and goals, the board of directors of the Terra Foundation for American Art decided to expand the reach of the foundation and to close the Terra Museum in Chicago at the end of October 2004.

Before the museum closed, Judith Terra, the founder's widow and his second wife, plus several board members, attempted to relocate the museum to Washington, D.C., but a 2004 legal settlement required the Foundation to stay in the state of Illinois for 50 years.

The works formerly displayed at the museum continue to be owned by the Terra Foundation for American Art, and the Foundation continues to expand the collection. A selection of Terra Foundation paintings remains on long-term loan to the Art Institute of Chicago, and the Art Institute also houses the Foundation's collection of works on paper. The Foundation also makes significant loans to institutions and exhibitions worldwide.
