= Montana Museum of Art & Culture =

Art museum in Missoula, Montana

Coordinates: 46.8636°N 113.9852°W

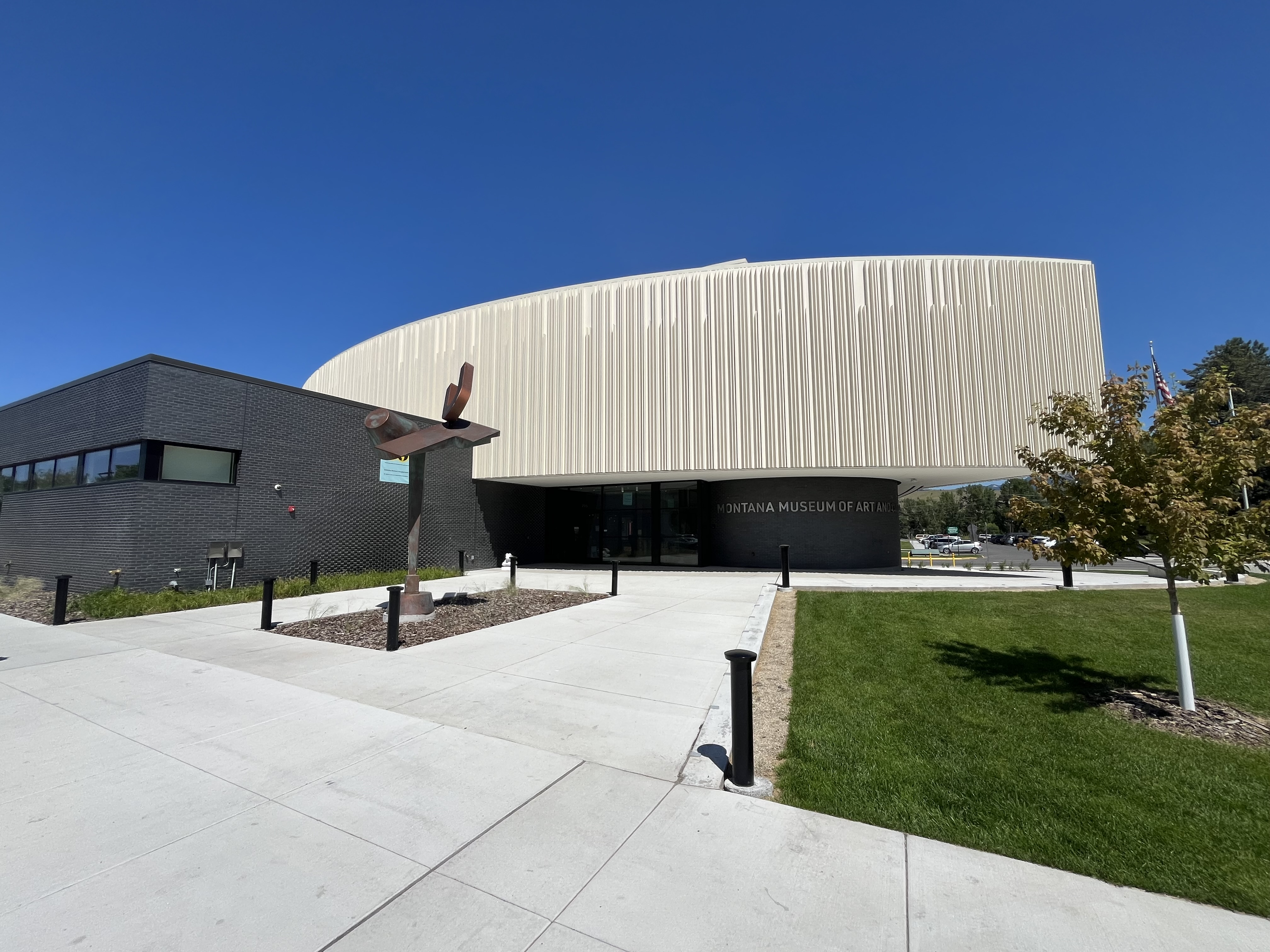
- Key holdings: Montana Horses (Rudy Autio)
- Collection size: 11,000
- Website: umt.edu/montanamuseum

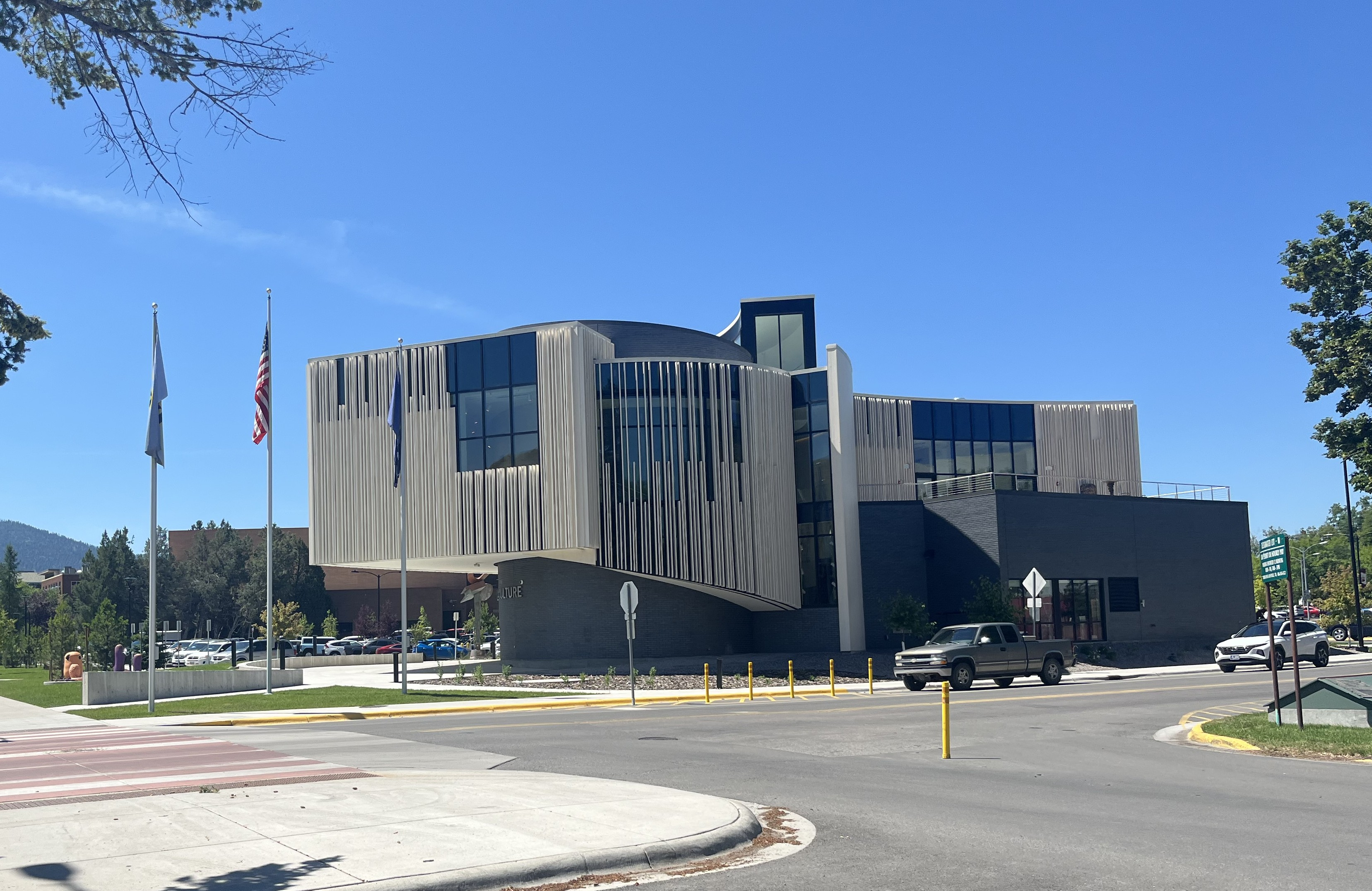
The MMAC at the University of Montana from the north side

The Montana Museum of Art & Culture, or the MMAC, is a University of Montana art museum in Missoula, Montana with a collection of over 11,000 objects, many of which are of the contemporary American West.

== History ==
The Montana Museum of Art & Culture was established shortly after the founding of the University of Montana in Missoula, Montana. The year was 1895 and the state's flagship university, established in 1893, had its first President, Oscar J. Craig, and fifty enrolled students. A request to the Smithsonian Museum of Natural History in Washington, D.C., for some specimens to support academic disciplines at the new university resulted in the first recorded donation, consisting of minerals, sea invertebrates, fish, and plants. While objects of a scientific nature are no longer a part of the museum, the MMAC's Permanent Collection has grown to include close to 11,000 works of art and cultural artifacts.

At the turn of the last century, collections continued to be acquired and were initially housed on the first floor of the new University Hall, designed by architect A.J. Gibson. Locations within the "Main Hall", as it has come to be known, changed several times, due to growth of the university. In 1912, the museum space was abandoned altogether to make way for a Law Library and the collections remained dormant until the conclusion of World War I. In the early 1920s, the University of Montana and museum experienced another period of intense growth. The first major donations from the estates of A.J. and Maud Gibson, John Ellsworth Lewis, and famous western artist E.S. Paxson established the foundations of the Permanent Collection. As the original several hundred minerals and objects from the sea became a teaching collection for the sciences, the museum's holdings expanded to include a vast treasury of fine art, sculpture, ceramics, textiles, furniture, and other important works from various cultures, countries, and periods.

In 1937, Art Digest and Newsweek magazines praised the museum, the latter calling it, "the first art museum in the Inland Northwest". A pivotal moment came in 1948 with the receipt of two significant donations of fine art by collector Stella Louise Duncan and Montana artist Fra Dana. Other notable donations included: Alfred F. Penard's collection of Native American artifacts; Robert Lehman's collection of 16th century Italian majolica; New Deal-era prints from the General Services Administration in Washington, D.C.; Carolyn McGill's donation of 1,200 objects; Helen Cappadocia's textile and book collection; the Ben Steele Collection of P.O.W. drawings and paintings; and the recent acquisition of European paintings and sculptures belonging to Montana Senator and "Copper King" William A. Clark.

The MMAC's present location in the Meloy and Paxson Galleries was made possible by the completion of the PARTV Center in 1985. Two spaces for exhibition and storage were designated for what was then known as the "Museum of Fine Arts". In 1995, under the leadership of Museum Director and Curator Maggie Mudd, the galleries and new storage spaces were retrofitted with security and climate control. In 2001, the museum was renamed the "Montana Museum of Art and Culture" and was designated one of three state museums, along with the Montana Historical Society in Helena and the Museum of the Rockies in Bozeman. Barbara Koostra became director in 2008. In 2019, University of Montana Art History & Criticism Professor Dr. H. Rafael Chacón was named Bruce and Suzanne Director of the MMAC.
