= Wright Museum of Art =

Art museum in Beloit, Wisconsin

Coordinates: 42°30′07.5″N 89°01′53.5″W

- Location within Wisconsin
- Established: 1892
- Location: Beloit, Wisconsin
- Type: Art museum
- Collections: American Impressionism; Modernism; German Expressionism; Japanese Modernism
- Collection size: 6,000
- Visitors: 400,000 annually
- Director: Joy Beckman
- Curator: Christa Story
- Owner: Beloit College
- Public transit access: Scoville Center (Beloit Transit)
- Parking: On site (no charge)
- Website: beloit.edu/wright

The Wright Museum of Art is a small art museum maintained and operated by Beloit College in Beloit, Wisconsin. It houses a collection of approximately 6,000 objects, has five gallery spaces, and provides training for undergraduate students in museum studies. The building is also home to the department of studio art and art history.

The Wright Museum of Art was founded with the donation of Helen Brace Emerson's personal collection in 1892. Emerson continued to be involved in art appreciation and access at Beloit College. In 1894 she brought a collection of ancient Greek sculpture that had been displayed at the 1893 World's Columbian Exposition in Chicago. At the behest of Emerson other individuals gifted the College art and donations to further the art department.

In the year 1930 Beloit College partnered with the city of Beloit to build the Wright Museum of Art. The initial funds of $139,000 constructed at building modeled after the Fogg Art Museum at Harvard University. Over the years new additions were added to the museum: a second floor in 1949, an annex in 1960, and general renovations in 1996 and 2009. The museum was named for Theodore Lyman Wright, an 1880 graduate and later professor of Greek and the fine arts.

The objects housed at the Wright Museum are "mostly European and American prints and paintings, College portraits, 19th century historic architecture photos, Soviet political propaganda posters, and Asian decorative arts, icons, and woodblock prints."
