= Broken Walrus I =

- Artist: Gary Freeman
- Year: 1975
- Type: Mild steel
- Dimensions: 91 cm × 61 cm × 240 cm (36 in × 24 in × 96 in)
- Location: Indiana University-Purdue University Indianapolis; Indianapolis, Indiana, United States; 39°46.390′N 86°10.487′W

Broken Walrus I, a public sculpture by American sculptor Gary Freeman, was installed on the Indiana University-Purdue University Indianapolis campus, near downtown Indianapolis, Indiana, in 1975. Located north of the IUPUI Lecture Hall, the sculpture was removed around 2004 after it rusted. The work was fabricated in mild steel, painted an orange-red matte finish, and measured 36-inch (91 cm) tall by 8-foot (2.4 m) long by 24-inch (61 cm) wide.

== Description ==
Broken Walrus I, a mild steel sculpture with an orange-red painted matte finish, was an abstract representation of a single walrus tusk broken into two pieces. Rather than a realistic, round tusk, it had squared edges and exaggerated, squared ends. To portray the sense of brokenness, the work had two pieces: a larger, main tusk and a smaller section resting against it. The larger section had thin pieces on the sides that radiated from each curve to give it an even more abstract feel. The piece's dimensions were 36-inch (91 cm) by 8-foot (2.4 m) by 24-inch (61 cm); it sat on a raised concrete rectangle base measuring approximately 2-foot (0.61 m) high by 7-foot (2.1 m) long.

A black and white photograph of Broken Walrus I appears in the exhibit catalog Gary Freeman: A Decade of Sculpture 1979 to 1989.

== Location ==
From 1975 until it was removed around 2004, Broken Walrus I was located north of New York Street on the IUPUI campus; north of the IUPUI Lecture Hall and west of Joseph T. Taylor Hall (formerly University College) at 815 W. Michigan Street. Artist Brent Gann's abstract piece, Orange Curves, was installed in the former location of Broken Walrus I.

== Condition ==
Around 2004 Broken Walrus I was removed and disassembled due to extreme rust. Because it was in great need of repair, IUPUI's Campus Facility Services approached Valerie Eickmeier, Dean of the Herron School of Art and Design, who contacted Freeman and obtained the artist's permission to remove and disassemble the sculpture.

Broken Walrus I was made of mild steel, a material which corrodes at a faster rate than other forms of steel such as cast iron or stainless steel. Mild steel is commonly used because of its cost, ease of use, strength, and ability to take on more deformation without failing. It also corrodes more quickly in outdoor environments, especially moist atmospheres, and causes increased loss of metal due to rusting the longer it is exposed. Broken Walrus I was displayed outdoors for nearly thirty years, through cycles of harsh, midwestern winters and humid summers, causing the structure to become increasingly corroded until it was more efficient to remove the sculpture rather than repair it.

Broken Walrus II, a similar sculpture by Freeman, was made of the same material, and suffered a similar fate.

== See also ==
- Obos (fountain)
- Snowplow (di Suvero)
- Indiana Limestone (Doddoli)
- Quaestio Librae
