= List of outdoor artworks at Newfields =

This is a list of works of art at Newfields, the campus that also contains the Indianapolis Museum of Art which are located outside, on one of three campus locations:

- Virginia B. Fairbanks Art & Nature Park
- Indianapolis Museum of Art grounds
- Oldfields–Lilly House & Gardens

There are also artworks that the museum has out on loan, and those that have been deaccessioned.

Title	Artist	Year	Location/GPS coordinates	Material	Dimensions	Owner	Image
Above and Below	Maya Lin	2007	Indianapolis Museum of Art grounds 39°49′33.77″N 86°11′10.19″W	Epoxy-coated aluminum tubing	240 x 1200	Indianapolis Museum of Art	IMA image
Antique Wellhead	Unknown	Late 19th century	Oldfields–Lilly House & Gardens 39°49′49.79″N 86°11′2.09″W	Limestone	29 x 31 x 31	Indianapolis Museum of Art	IMA image
Bench Around the Lake	Jeppe Hein	2010	Virginia B. Fairbanks Art & Nature Park 39°49′39.88″N 86°11′18.95″W	Painted aluminum	Park installation	Indianapolis Museum of Art	
Birdbath	Unknown	Early 20th century	Oldfields–Lilly House & Gardens 39°49′45.46″N 86°10′59.94″W	Field stone and mortar	24 x 36 (diam.)	Indianapolis Museum of Art	IMA image
Bronze Fountain	Unknown, English	c. 1860	Oldfields–Lilly House & Gardens 39°49′31.21″N 86°11′7.19″W	Cast bronze	66 x 36 (diam.)	Indianapolis Museum of Art	IMA image
Chop Stick	visiondivision	2012	Virginia B. Fairbanks Art & Nature Park 39°49′37.94″N 86°11′21.26″W	Tulip tree, other material	Park installation	Indianapolis Museum of Art	IMA image 1 IMA image 2
Copy of Diana of Versailles	Unknown	Early 20th century	Oldfields–Lilly House & Gardens 39°49′38.19″N 86°11′8.12″W	Concrete	39 x 27.5 x 63	Indianapolis Museum of Art	IMA image
Diana with Dog	Unknown	Early 20th century	Oldfields–Lilly House & Gardens 39°49′35.83″N 86°10′58.66″W	Limestone	78 x 36 x 30	Indianapolis Museum of Art	IMA image
Eden II	Tea Mäkipää	2010	Virginia B. Fairbanks Art & Nature Park 39°49′42.88″N 86°11′31.3″W	Mixed media	Park installation	Indianapolis Museum of Art	IMA image
Female Herm and Male Herm	Unknown	Early 20th century	Oldfields–Lilly House & Gardens 39°49′40.1″N 86°11′8.39″W	Marble	84 x 24 x 24	Indianapolis Museum of Art	IMA image
Four Seasons,	Unknown Italian artisans	Early 20th century?	Oldfields–Lilly House & Gardens 39°49′37.85″N 86°10′59.89″W	Limestone	30 x 12 x 12	Indianapolis Museum of Art	IMA image 1, IMA image 2, IMA image 3, IMA image 4
Free Basket	Los Carpinteros	2010	Virginia B. Fairbanks Art & Nature Park 39°49′31.87″N 86°11′19.75″W	Painted metal	Park installation	Indianapolis Museum of Art	IMA image
Funky Bones	Atelier van Lieshout	2010	Virginia B. Fairbanks Art & Nature Park 39°49′38.78″N 86°11′25.15″W	Painted fiberglass	Park installation	Indianapolis Museum of Art	IMA image
Indianapolis Island	Andrea Zittel	2010	Virginia B. Fairbanks Art & Nature Park 39°49′48.30″N 86°11′17.77″W	Painted fiberglass, mixed media	Park installation	Indianapolis Museum of Art	IMA image
La Hermana del Hombre-Boveda	Pablo Serrano	1963	Indianapolis Museum of Art grounds 39°49′34.43″N 86°10′59.23″W	Bronze	38 x 34 x 38 in.	Indianapolis Museum of Art	IMA image
Memories of Prague	David Louis Rodgers	1983–85	Indianapolis Museum of Art grounds 39°49′33.88″N 86°11′11.35″W	Limestone	50 x 44 (diam.)	Indianapolis Museum of Art	IMA image
Mother and Child	Dora Gordine	1940	Indianapolis Museum of Art grounds 39°49′36.92″N 86°11′3.18″W	Bronze	43 1/2 x 92 1/2 in.	Indianapolis Museum of Art	IMA image
Numbers 1-0	Robert Indiana	1980–82	Indianapolis Museum of Art grounds 39°49′33.83″N 86°11′10.76″W	Painted aluminum	10 sculptures, 96 x 96 x 48	Indianapolis Museum of Art	IMA image
Nymph and Fawn	Isidore Konti	1917	Oldfields–Lilly House & Gardens 39°49′40.69″N 86°11′8.42″W	Bronze	56.25 x 24 x 20	Indianapolis Museum of Art	
Park of the Laments	Alfredo Jaar	2010	Virginia B. Fairbanks Art & Nature Park 39°49′37.73″N 86°11′18″W	Earth work	Park installation	Indianapolis Museum of Art	IMA image
The Pigeon Girl	Brenda Putnam	1919 installed c. 1933	Oldfields–Lilly House & Gardens	Bronze	68 x 29 x 27 in.	Indianapolis Museum of Art	IMA image
Snowplow	Mark di Suvero	1972	Indianapolis Museum of Art grounds 39°49′30.04″N 86°10′57.71″W	Painted steel, rubber tire	144 x 132 x 84	Indianapolis Museum of Art	
Stratum Pier	Kendall Buster	2010	Virginia B. Fairbanks Art & Nature Park 39°49′42.22″N 86°11′25.14″W	Fiberglass, metal, concrete	Park installation	Indianapolis Museum of Art	IMA image
Stumbling Man	David K. Rubins	1969	Indianapolis Museum of Art grounds 39°49′36.01″N 86°11′0.7″W	Bronze	32.5" x 38" x 62"	Indianapolis Museum of Art	IMA image
Sundial, Boy With Spider	Willard Dryden Paddock	1916	Oldfields–Lilly House & Gardens 39°49′38.73″N 86°11′2.24″W	Bronze	30 x 20 x 29 in	Indianapolis Museum of Art	IMA image
Sutphin Fountain	Stu Dawson	1972	Indianapolis Museum of Art grounds 39°49′33.29″N 86°11′5.54″W	Indiana limestone	40 in. x 34 ft (diam.)	Indianapolis Museum of Art	
Team Building (Align)	Type A	2010	Virginia B. Fairbanks Art & Nature Park 39°49′36.8″N 86°11′21.55″W	Aluminum	Park installation	Indianapolis Museum of Art	IMA image
The Three Graces	Unknown	Early 20th century	Oldfields–Lilly House & Gardens 39°49′39.32″N 86°10′57.99″W	Marble	44 x 36 x 21	Indianapolis Museum of Art	IMA image
Two Figures	Barbara Hepworth	1968	Indianapolis Museum of Art grounds 39°49′33.26″N 86°11′4.1″W	Bronze	89 x 49 x 15 in.	Indianapolis Museum of Art	IMA image
Two Lines Oblique Down, Variation III	George Rickey	1970	Indianapolis Museum of Art grounds 39°49′31.21″N 86°11′7.19″W	Stainless steel	31 x 42 x 8 ft.	Indianapolis Museum of Art	IMA image
Urns	Unknown	Early 20th century?	Oldfields–Lilly House & Gardens 39°49′40.06″N 86°11′0.33″W	Limestone	108 x 42 x 42	Indianapolis Museum of Art	IMA image 1, IMA image 2
