= Indiana Limestone (Doddoli) =

- Artist: Adolfo Doddoli
- Year: 1976
- Type: Indiana Limestone
- Dimensions: 61 cm × 91 cm × 40 cm (2 ft × 3 ft × 1.3 ft)
- Location: Indianapolis, Indiana, United States; 39°46.384′N 86°10.488′W
- Owner: Indiana University-Purdue University Indianapolis

Indiana Limestone, a public sculpture by Italian-American artist Adolfo Doddoli, is located on the Indiana University-Purdue University Indianapolis campus, which is near downtown Indianapolis, Indiana. The sculpture is located on the east corner of the north side of the lecture hall under the overhang. The lecture hall is located at 325 University Boulevard in Indianapolis, Indiana. The sculpture was commissioned for the Indianapolis University-Purdue University Indianapolis's (IUPUI) campus in the mid-1970s. It was installed by the artist.

== Description ==
Indiana Limestone was carved out of one 42"x40"x17.5" piece of limestone obtained from the Wooley Stone Company Inc. located in Bloomington, Indiana. The sculpture was complete as of February 1976 and sat in storage at the Herron School of Art until its installation in 1978.

The shape of the sculpture is roughly oval with rounded and organic detailing. There is a channel-like indentation carved into the front of the sculpture. The edges of the top and bottom of both the sculpture as a whole and the channel are scalloped giving the impression of a clam opening. The fluid structure of the shape contrasts with the hardness of the material used. Doddoli favored this juxtaposition using it as a reference to the industrial age. A plaque bearing the title, name of the artist and date is located on the proper left front corner of the base of the sculpture just above the concrete base pedestal.

Stone sculpture is generally carved in three steps: roughing out, intermediate carving and final finishing. The first step is generally carried out with a large hammer and chisel. Large chunks of rock are taken off and the basic shape is formed. The next step is commonly undertaken with some sort of mechanical instrument to further refine the shape and add detail. Final finishing can be undertaken with a small hammer and chisel combination or through some method of abrasion. A photograph in the Digital collection of IUPUI University Library shows Adolfo Doddoli engaging in an abrasive technique to finish a sculpture.

== Information ==
This sculpture was one of four commissioned by IUPUI in the mid-1970s for installation around Cavanaugh Hall Hall and other high traffic areas. The proposals/works were selected by an internal committee and funded by national grants from the National Endowment for the Arts and matching fund from Friends of the university. Other artists selected at the time were Gary Edson, Gary Freeman and Charles Hook. Each artist was given $1000 for materials and production.

Indiana Limestone was stored in the Herron School of Art from at least February 23, 1976, to its installation on the north side of the lecture hall before August 1978. Since the installation of the sculpture, it has not been moved from its position at the east corner of the north side of the lecture hall which is located at 325 University Blv in Indianapolis, Indiana.

=== Placement and installation ===
The artist requested its placement at the north side of the lecture hall under the overhang so as to protect the sculpture from corrosion. He also requested a 3-foot-high pedestal base to be used to mount the sculpture. A request was issued for the creation of this base in February 1976, citing the space the finished sculpture was taking up in Herron's art studios, but there is no evidence that it was made until the installation in 1978.

=== Labeling ===
The sculpture was installed in 1978 without a label. Arthur Weber, Dean of the Herron School of Art indicated that each of the sculptures commissioned for campus should be clearly labeled. Through a series of memorandums in 1978 and 1979 between Weber, Vice Chancellor Moore, Gary Freeman and Adolfo Doddoli a plaque was made and eventually installed on the base of the sculpture some time after June 5, 1979.

== Artist ==
Adolfo Doddoli is from Florence, Italy where he studied at the Instituto Statale D'Arte. He obtained his maestro d'arte at the age of 18 and furthered his studies at the same institution, obtaining a second degree which allowed him to teach. In 1960 he emigrated to the United States of America to study at the Colorado College in Colorado Springs with a foreign student scholarship. After a short break from school to teach Doddoli attended the University of Kentucky at Lexington where he obtained a master's degree in fine arts in 1969. Conversely, The Herron Chronicle, a book detailing the first 100 years of the Herron School of Art, list's Doddoli's MFA as coming from Northern Illinois University.

After studying at Colorado College for a year, Doddoli taught at Southern Colorado State College at Pueblo. He later worked in a casting house in New York state before attending the University of Kentucky. In the fall of 1969 Doddoli joined the Herron School of Art, where he taught fundamentals of design on a one-year contract. He returned the next year as a full faculty member, staying at Herron until 1999 retiring as associate professor emeritus. While at Herron, Doddoli chaired the 1988 Herron Building Committee. This committee compiled the needs assessment plan which proposed a new building for the school. It would take more than 10 years for the work indicated in the needs assessment to come to fruition.

In 1987, two chairs designed by Adolfo Doddoli were included in the exhibition "Topeka Kansas 1987." This exhibition featured furniture designs by thirteen artists and was held in the LimeLight gallery in Dearborn, Michigan.

When speaking of his sculpture Doddoli has said: "In my work I am trying to visualize an impression or a feeling which I have experienced while observing life."

== Documentation ==
A Museum Studies course at IUPUI recently undertook the project of researching and reporting on the condition of 40 outdoor sculptures on the university campus. Indiana Limestone was included in this movement. This documentation was influenced by the successful Save Outdoor Sculpture! 1989 campaign organized by Heritage Preservation: The National Institute of Conservation partnered with the Smithsonian Institution, specifically the Smithsonian American Art Museum. Throughout the 1990s, over 7,000 volunteers nationwide have cataloged and assessed the condition of over 30,000 publicly accessible statues, monuments, and sculptures installed as outdoor public art across the United States.

== See also ==
- Obos (fountain)
- Snowplow (di Suvero)
- Broken Walrus I
- Quaestio Librae
- The Seated Scribe
