= Four Seasons (sculpture set) =

Sculpture set in Indiana

Four Seasons (Spring, Summer, Autumn, Winter)
- Artist: Unknown, Italian
- Year: Made by the early 20th century
- Type: Stone
- Dimensions: 76 cm × 30 cm × 30 cm (30 in × 12 in × 12 in)
- Location: Indianapolis Museum of Art; Indianapolis, Indiana; 39°49′37.85″N 86°10′59.89″W
- Owner: Indianapolis Museum of Art

The Four Seasons are a set of four stone allegorical putti, each representing a traditional, temperate season. These are a part of the outdoor sculpture collection of the historic Oldfields estate, located on the campus of the Indianapolis Museum of Art (IMA), in Indianapolis, Indiana.

== Description ==
The four sculptures are similar in size, color, and sculptural style. Each is carved from a single block of white stone. Each figure stands on a small, square base and is structurally supported by a carved tree stump. On the underside of each base is carved the word "ITALY". In their current placement the sculptures are elevated to eye level on matching tall, narrow, rectangular stone bases constructed in three pieces and held together via mortise and tenon. The sculptures differ in that each is shown with a traditional iconographic indicator of the depicted season.

Spring, to which the IMA assigned accession number LH2001.238, is distinguished by the presence of flower blossoms. The putto stands with his left leg forward, supporting on his left hip a woven basket filled with blossoms. His right hand holds a cluster of large buds. The figure is clad in a cloth wrapped around his waist and rolled at the upper edge for support, and on his head he wears an anadem (wreath) of blossoms.

Summer, accession number LH2001.236, is identified with wheat. This putto stands in a rather dynamic contrapposto, weight on his straightened left leg, swinging his laden arms out to his left side. With both hands he is holding a sheaf of harvested wheat. His head is turned slightly to his right. The figure is clad in a synthesis or draped cloth clasped over the left shoulder and belted around the waist, and he wears a thin cloth headband around his curls that is knotted in back.

Autumn, accession number LH2001.239, shows the fruits of the season and a goblet. The putto stands in a slight contrapposto, weight on his proper right leg, and his head turned to his left. His arms reach out in front of his belly. In his proper right hand he holds a goblet, and his left hand holds a cluster of grapes. He is clad in a robe tied over the right shoulder and twisted along the upper edge across the chest. It is belted around the waist. He wears a wreath of grapevine in his curls. Behind him, to the proper right of the tree stump, is a basket of fruit.

Winter, accession number LH2001.237, bears no produce. In this sculpture a putto stands with his weight on his straightened left leg and his right leg bent and crossed in front of the left, the ball of the right foot resting on a rock. His upper body leans right and his arms are crossed, right over left. The right hand grasps the left upper arm, and the left hand clutches the two ends of a cloth wrapped around the boy from waist to knee. The figure looks to his left. Unlike the other sculptures in this set, LH2001.237's curly locks are unadorned.

== Context ==
The Four Seasons are an ancient decorative motif. Usually each season is represented as an allegorical figure bearing traditional iconographic symbols. The Romans typically represented the seasons as voluptuous goddesses known as the Horae. This imagery carried over into neoclassical art and later became especially popular as garden sculpture. Putti (re-popularized in the Renaissance) became common allegorical figures and often took over the role of the Horae, as here. This change in preference may have occurred because putti are more innocuous than the sexualized goddesses of antiquity.

=== Iconography ===
Spring is shown with profuse flowers because it is the season when most flowering plants blossom.

Summer holds a sheaf of wheat and wears a cloth headband to illustrate the labor and product of the wheat harvest, which is done in the summer. Wheat can either be planted in the winter ("winter wheat") or the spring ("spring wheat"), to be harvested at the beginning or very end of summer, respectively.

Autumn is the season in which most fruits become ripe. Since grapes are harvested in the fall, wine is also made in the fall. This is alluded to by the goblet.

Winter is shown without produce and striving to warm himself because the temperate winter is cold and rather barren.

== Historical information ==
The grounds of Oldfields were landscaped by Percival Gallagher of the Olmsted Brothers in the 1920s. The property and all sculptures on it were donated to the IMA by the family of former Oldfields owner Josiah K. Lilly Jr., in 1967. In 2001 the outdoor sculptures were assessed, and eighteen selected pieces were accessioned into the IMA's Lilly House collection. The Seasons were among these and were assigned the accession numbers listed above in the description.

=== Provenance ===
The "Italy" carving on the underside of each sculpture suggests that these were produced in Italy for export. Nothing is known of the maker of this set.

=== Acquisition ===
It is not known with certainty when this sculpture set was first brought to the Oldfields estate, but it is documented in historic photographs from the Landon era.

=== Location history ===
The Four Seasons Garden was designed in 1939 by Haldeman & Leland to complement the Recreation Building, which was added to the property in 1940 by the Lilly family. The Seasons putti are believed to date to the Landon era and were incorporated into the new garden design.

In 2006 all four sculptures and their pedestals were removed from view for conservation work, and then replaced. For the 2010 Four Seasons Garden renovations the sculptures were removed to Newfield (the house J.K. Lilly Jr., built as a home by for his son) for storage. They were reinstalled upon completion of the renovation in April, 2011, but are not in the original positions. LH2001.238 and LH2001.239 have been exchanged accidentally.

== Condition ==
The sculptures are monitored, cleaned, and treated regularly by the IMA art conservation staff. All sculptures are considered structurally sound and stable as of 2011.

== See also ==
- List of Indianapolis Museum of Art artworks
- Indianapolis Museum of Art
