= Female and Male Herm (sculpture set) =

Female Herm and Male Herm
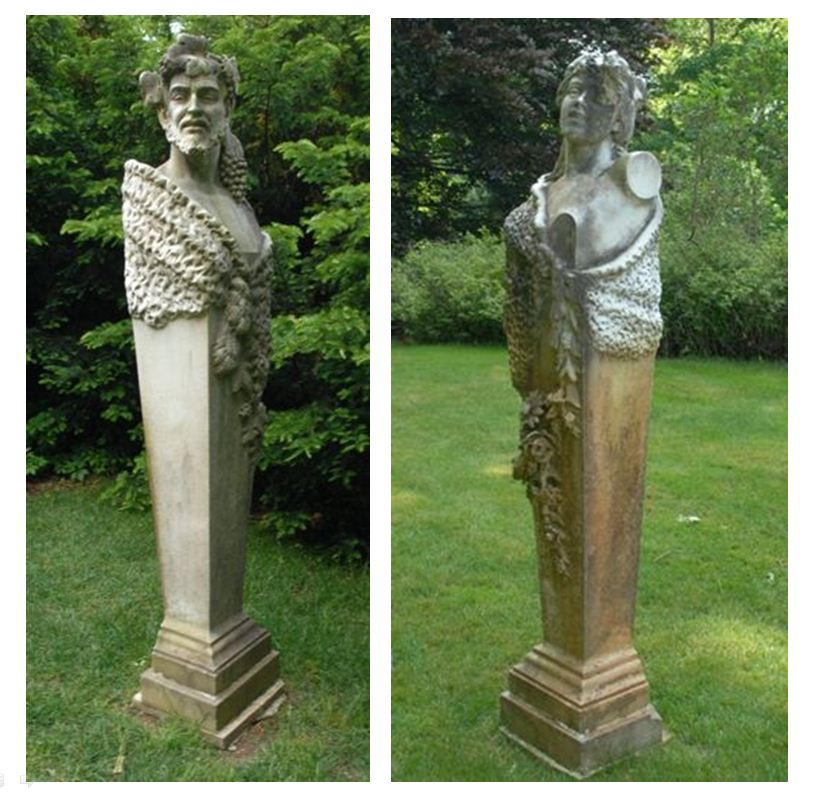
- Artist: Unknown
- Type: Carrara marble
- Dimensions: 210 cm × 61 cm × 61 cm (84 in × 24 in × 24 in)
- Location: Indianapolis Museum of Art; Indianapolis, Indiana; 39°49′40.1″N 86°11′8.39″W
- Owner: Indianapolis Museum of Art

Female Herm and Male Herm are a set of two neoclassical marble herms in the outdoor sculpture collection of the historic Oldfields estate, located on the campus of the Indianapolis Museum of Art (IMA), in Indianapolis, Indiana. Together the herms depict either Dionysus and a Maenad or a dryad and a satyr.

== Description ==
Each herm consists of a head and upper torso blended into a simple, squared column that tapers to a narrow width and then expands slightly outward into a more decorative, banded rectangular base.

The female figure's head leans slightly back, looking a little to the proper left and up. Her facial expression is relaxed and she smiles widely, showing her teeth. Her long hair is tucked back loosely and adorned with a wreath of flowers. Unlike the male herm, the female has certain extremities included that are truncated by the sculptor. The figure's proper left shoulder is raised as though the arm is extended outward, but the arm is instead cut smooth in a vertical plane about an inch out from the armpit. The otherwise exposed left breast is hinted at but again truncated into a smooth plane in line with the front side of the pillar. A sheepskin is draped over her proper right shoulder and breast and wrapped around the back so that two hoofed legs tie in front, under the plane of the left breast. The sheep's head hangs down her proper right side. A cascading series of wildflowers extends down from under the hoofs almost to the base.

The male figure's head turns regally on its muscular neck to align with the proper right front edge of the column. The strong-featured face bears a medium-length, wavy beard that comes to two slight points on the chin. The hair is crowned with a grape vine with bountiful leaves and grape clusters draping down along the neck on the proper left. The torso and upper column are draped with a feline skin which is tied by the front limbs on the front of the sculpture. The surface of the skin is heavily drilled, either to evoke a wooliness of the fur or to represent the spots of a leopard with shadow. Another grape vine trails down and to the proper left from beneath the tied paws.

== Art Historical Context ==
The herm (from the Greek ῾Ηρμῆς, the messenger of the Gods and patron of thieves and travelers) follows a sculptural tradition begun in ancient Greece, in which a human head was carved on top of a squared pillar or pedestal of proportionate body height. Archaic herms, used as road markers and signs of auspiciousness, usually depicted the god Hermes and frequently included the male genitalia carved directly onto the pillar at the appropriate height. Later the herm became less rigid in its use and served as a template for portraits, a tradition adopted by the Romans. During the Renaissance the herm received a resurgence of popularity as both a decorative and an architectural form.

Here the Neoclassical tradition has taken the ancient genre and used it to depict another ancient theme. The plants and skins shown on the two sculptures reflect both pastoral settings and Bacchic revelry. The male herm may represent the god Dionysus, who was often depicted with grapes and a leopard, but pointed ears on this herm may indicate that it is not the god himself but rather one of his satyr followers. Likewise the female herm may be a dryad (nymph of the woods, often paired with satyrs or fauns), or a Maenad (a human female devotee of Dionysus), often described as clad in skins and cavorting madly or drunkenly, as this figure's vibrant posture may suggest.

== Historical information ==
The grounds of Oldfields were landscaped by Percival Gallagher of the Olmsted Brothers in the 1920s. The property and all sculptures on it were donated to the IMA by the family of former Oldfields owner Josiah K. Lilly Jr., in 1967. In 2001 the outdoor sculptures were assessed, and eighteen selected pieces were accessioned into the IMA's Lilly House collection. Female Herm was assigned Accession Number LH2001.240, and Male Herm was assigned LH2001.241.

=== Provenance ===
The maker and place of origin are unknown. The material is Carrara marble, widely used for sculpture and quarried around Carrara, Italy; thus the sculpture set may have been made in Italy. The two herms were clearly manufactured and sold as a set, as indicated by the symmetry of form and subject matter.

=== Acquisition ===
It is not known with certainty when this sculpture set was first brought to the Oldfields estate, but it is documented in historic photographs from the Landon era.

=== Location history ===
The herms were originally positioned on either side of the north entrance path of the Formal Garden. The two are aligned on an east–west axis, with Female Herm on the eastern side of the path and Male Herm on the western. They have remained in approximately the same place since (with the exception of some time in storage during the 1992 Formal Garden renovation).

== Condition ==
The marble sculptures are monitored, cleaned, and treated regularly by the IMA art conservation staff. Both sculptures are considered structurally sound and stable as of 2011.

== See also ==
- List of Indianapolis Museum of Art artworks
- Indianapolis Museum of Art
