= The Three Graces (Indianapolis) =

Sculpture by an unknown artist

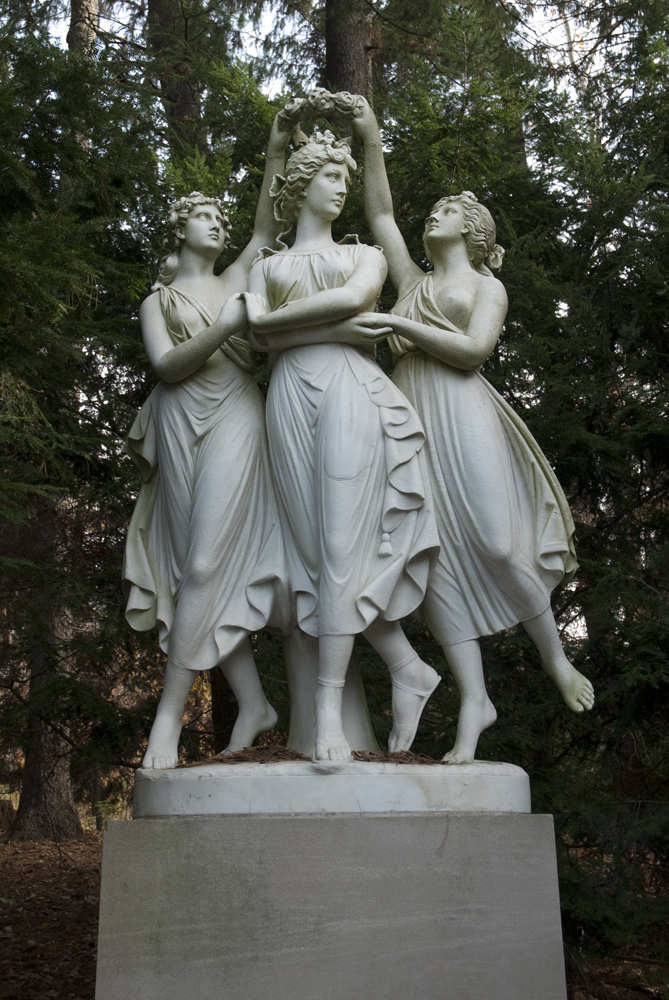
- Artist: Unknown, Italian?
- Year: Unknown, before c. 1925
- Type: Carrara marble
- Dimensions: 300 cm × 140 cm × 86 cm (120 in × 54 in × 34 in)
- Location: Indianapolis Museum of Art; Indianapolis, Indiana; 39°49′39.32″N 86°10′57.99″W
- Owner: Indianapolis Museum of Art

The Three Graces is a nearly life-size, figurative Carrara marble outdoor sculpture group located on the historic Oldfields estate on the campus of the Indianapolis Museum of Art (IMA), in Indianapolis, Indiana. The neoclassical marble sculpture depicts the Three Graces, minor goddesses of the Greco-Roman pantheon. The group consists of three women frontally oriented, standing in a row upon a base. The sculpture is modeled after a c. 1797 sculpture by Antonio Canova.

== Description ==
The Graces are positioned in a row, all frontally oriented. The central figure—the tallest and furthest forward of the three—seems to be the visual focus and is framed by the auxiliary figures, who support a wreath above her head with their extended, inner arms. The central figure's head is turned to the proper left, while the outer figures are both looking at the wreath. The central figure's arms are crossed at waist-height as she takes hold of the outer hands of the two outer figures (her proper left hand takes the proper right hand of the proper right figure, and vice versa). She stands mid-stride with her weight on her left foot, which is crossed in front and nearly to the right of her body, while her right leg sweeps behind it and to her left, with the toes barely contacting the ground.

While the outer figures create an approximate visual symmetry from the waist up, their legs are different. The figure on the proper right stands similarly to the central figure, while the proper left figure balances on her right toes and extends her left leg behind her and to the left.

Each of the women is clad in a thin, flowing, neoclassical dress that reaches mid-calf. The outer figures’ dresses have a tie only over the right shoulder, exposing the left breast of each figure. The central figure's dress has a tassel hanging off a fold on the front left, and the top completely covers her chest but leaves her arms bare. The central figure alone wears sandals. Each of the three has a crisp ribbon in her hair.

This sculpture stands on a tall, three-part base made of limestone and concrete. The bottommost layer is simply a poured concrete slab. Upon this sits a large limestone pedestal with a thick, simply carved border along its lower edge. Its sides curve inward and upward toward the next piece, a simple rectangular limestone block upon which is mortared the sculpture itself.

== Historical information ==
The grounds of Oldfields were landscaped by Percival Gallagher of the Olmsted Brothers in the 1920s. The property and all sculptures on it were donated to the IMA by the family of former Oldfields owner Josiah K. Lilly Jr., in 1967. In 2001 the outdoor sculptures were assessed, and eighteen selected pieces were accessioned into the IMA's Lilly House collection. The Three Graces was assigned Accession Number LH2001.227.

=== Provenance ===
IMA Director of Historic Resources and Assistant Curator of the American Decorative Arts collection Bradley Brooks has researched the sculpture's origins to discover some important art historical background, though the sculptor himself has not been identified. The sculpture seems most probably to be based on a tempera painting and a gesso relief of the same scene, The Three Graces and Venus Dancing Before Mars, both by Antonio Canova. The relief is dated to 1797, and the painting may have been made before that as a sketch. Both are owned by the Museo Canova in Possagno, Italy. Not only are the poses and outfits remarkably similar to those on the statue, but it is also a fairly unusual design among representations of the Graces up to that time. Canova's painting and the IMA's sculpture conform to many of the goddesses’ traditional iconographic features, such as the flat composition and the intimate physical contact between them (here illustrated by the linked hands, closeness of the bodies, and the seemingly imminent placement of the wreath). It can be distinguished from the Greco-Roman tradition by several details, most notably the clothing. Ancient depictions of the Graces showed them almost exclusively in the nude and nearly always in a linear arrangement with the central figure embracing the outer figures but oriented in the opposite direction.

The identity of the sculptor is unclear. Canova produced a notable sculpture of the Graces, but his figures are in the nude, breaking with tradition by arranging the group in a triangle to allow a three-way embrace. By 1996 the IMA's sculpture was credited to Bertel Thorvaldsen in the docent files; Thorvaldsen was both influenced by Canova and known as the sculptor of another set of Graces. However, his sculpture is significantly dissimilar in style, and the Thorvaldsen Museum in Denmark used that information to confirm that he was not the sculptor.

The art market has been useful in identifying similar pieces, none of which have led to a major breakthrough. Records of related auction items are kept by the IMA as research documentation. Most significant among these is a Sotheby's auction item sold in New York in 2000. This was an Italian marble sculpture of the same design, half the size of the IMA's, and accredited to Antonio Frilli (Italian 19th/20th century) based on the inscription “A. Frilli Firenze.” The Frilli Gallery, founded by the artist, is a Florentine art school and sculpture reproduction studio that specializes in high-quality copies. To date there has been no confirmation that Antonio Frilli was connected to the production of the IMA Graces; there are several similar studios throughout Italy that might be responsible for such reproductions.

=== Acquisition ===
The exact date and circumstances of acquisition of the sculpture by the Oldfields estate are unknown, but it was documented in the designs of Percival Gallagher. It seems to have been purchased specifically for the Grand Allée by Gallagher as the sculptural centerpiece of the estate grounds.

=== Location history ===
The sculpture was brought to Oldfields to be the focus of the Grand Allée. The Allée is arranged so that the two monumental urns and the Graces form a sort of triangle around the fountain, with the Graces at the apex, elevated on a large limestone pedestal. The dark evergreens surrounding it, originally intended to set off the bright white of the marble, are now overgrown and partially block both the sunlight and the view of the sculpture.

An early photo, taken when the hemlocks were still quite young, shows the sculpture resting on the rectangular concrete slab but without the limestone pedestal, which was added in a re-design of the space by Gallagher in 1925. Gallagher's preliminary designs for the end of the Allée show several alternative setups framing the end with a free-standing colonnade (reminiscent of that at the Canopus of Hadrian's Villa in Tivoli) and other architectural features. The simple design implemented using only the Graces may have been a cost-saving measure or a rejection of the grandiosity of the architectural plans, but it did not compensate for the relative size, and the sculpture was probably then considered unsatisfactorily small for its location. It seems likely that as the trees grew the sculpture became less adequate and needed to become more prominent. The chosen solution was to bring in a tall pedestal to elevate and effectively enlarge the sculpture. Alternatively, the pedestal may have been selected late in the process or after the Graces had been delivered to Oldfields for the same reason, and was installed once completed.

The sculpture has not been moved since its installation.

== Condition ==
The sculpture is monitored, cleaned, and treated regularly by the IMA art conservation staff. This sculpture was surveyed in July 1993 as part of the Smithsonian American Art Museum's Inventories of American Painting and Sculpture database, and it was considered to be well maintained. During the 1990s the hands supporting the wreath were broken off at the wrist by a climber, but this break was repaired.

== See also ==
- List of Indianapolis Museum of Art artworks
- Indianapolis Museum of Art
