= Mother and Child (Gordine) =

Public artwork by Dora Gordine

- Artist: Dora Gordine
- Year: 1964
- Dimensions: 110 cm × 36 cm × 235 cm (43.5 in × 14 in × 92.5 in)
- Location: Indianapolis Museum of Art; Indianapolis, Indiana; 39°49′36.92″N 86°11′3.18″W
- Owner: Indianapolis Museum of Art

Mother and Child is a public artwork by the Estonian-British artist Dora Gordine, located at the Indianapolis Museum of Art (IMA), which is near downtown Indianapolis, Indiana. The cast bronze artwork was created in 1964 and portrays a woman kneeling beside a small child, both figures displaying joyful poses and expressions.

== Description ==
This cast bronze sculptural group shows two human figures linked by their hands. The dominant figure, much larger and central to the artwork, is a woman (the mother) who kneels so that her lower body is angled toward the proper right of the artwork. She seems to rest her weight on the knee of her folded left leg, while her right leg is outstretched in nearly the same direction as the left. Her torso is turned dramatically to her left in such a way that her outstretched arms, horizontal and aligned with her shoulders, are parallel to her right leg, and her face and shoulders are angled just slightly to the proper right of a frontal focus. She wears a thin, flowing garment, and her hair is tied back.

The second figure, a small, nude boy, stands just behind the mother's right foot, angled toward the proper left of the artwork. He holds a dramatized running pose, his right leg bent and extending behind him off the ground. His back arches as both of his arms reach up and grasp the right hand of the mother.

The surface of the bronze is textured with short hatched lines. The patina is a powdery light blue-green, fairly uniform in appearance.

The group weighs approximately 450 lbs. It sits on a limestone pedestal that measures 32” x 96” x 28”.

=== Identifying Marks ===
Cast into lowest edge of the mother’s skirt, the artist’s signature and edition number can be found. They appear as follows:

Dora Gordine 2/2

Foundry marks are located in the same area:

CIRE PERDUE
Morris
Singer
FOUNDERY (sic)
LONDON

== Historical information ==
Mother and Child was created in 1964 by the lost wax process by the Morris Singer foundry in London. It is the second of two castings and was made by the artist specifically for the IMA. The museum has owned the artwork since 1964, making it the earliest accessioned outdoor sculpture on display.

=== Other versions ===
The original casting of Mother and Child was commissioned by Queen Elizabeth of England to adorn the entrance of the Royal Marsden Cancer Centre in Sutton, Surrey. This casting was unveiled at the hospital by the Queen in 1963.

=== Location history ===
The artwork was first displayed in the auditorium of the IMA's previous building, and it remained indoors until the museum moved to its current building. Since then, other than removal for conservation attention, Mother and Child has been on view at the IMA on the boundary between Oldfields and the IMA's main campus, which displays contemporary art.

=== Acquisition ===
The IMA acquired Mother and Child upon its completion in 1964, when the museum was still known as the Art Association of Indianapolis. Its cost was covered by a gift from Mr. and Mrs. Anton Hulman, Jr.

== Artist ==
Dora Gordine was born in Latvia in 1895. She was raised in Estonia and St. Petersburg, and lived the majority of her adult life in London at Dorich House.

Gordine was a successful artist throughout the 1940s and 1950s, exhibiting regularly at the Royal Academy and doing many sculptural portraits for members of London society. She also traveled and lectured on multiple occasions in the United States. Her career ended in the 1970s and she died in 1991.

== Condition ==
Mother and Child is currently on outdoor display and can be viewed at the Indianapolis Museum of Art.

== See also ==
- List of Indianapolis Museum of Art artworks
- Save Outdoor Sculpture!
