= Sundial, Boy with Spider =

Artwork by Willard Dryden Paddock

Sundial, Boy With Spider
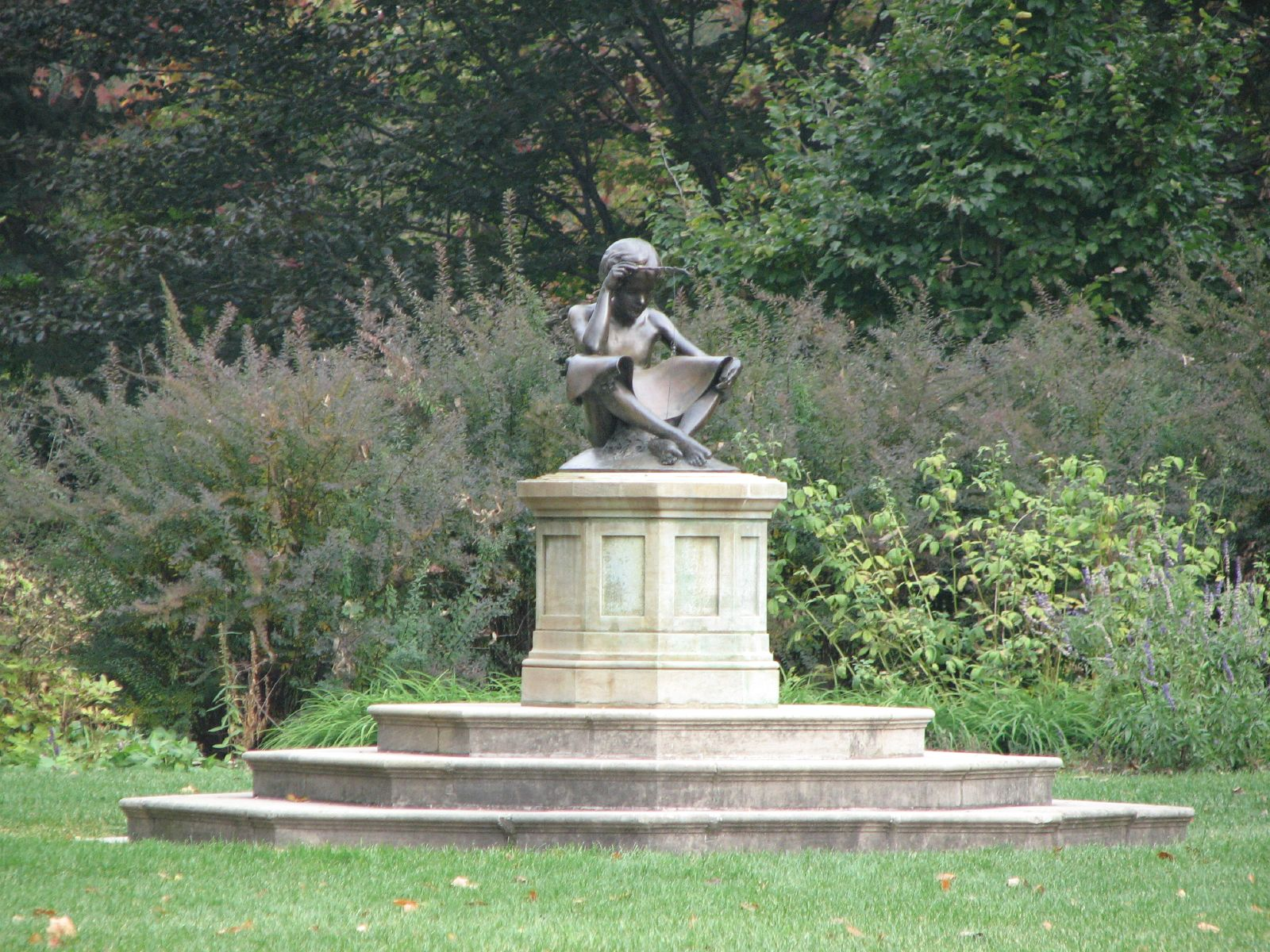
- Artist: Willard Dryden Paddock
- Year: 1916–1918; 108 years ago
- Type: Bronze
- Dimensions: 76 cm × 56 cm × 71 cm (30 in × 22 in × 28 in)
- Location: Indianapolis Museum of Art, Indianapolis, Indiana, United States; 39°49′38.73″N 86°11′2.24″W
- Owner: Indianapolis Museum of Art

Sundial, Boy With Spider is an outdoor sculpture and functional sundial by American artist Willard Dryden Paddock (1873–1956). It is located within the Oldfields estate on the grounds of the Indianapolis Museum of Art (IMA), in Indianapolis, Indiana, United States. The bronze sculpture, cast by the Gorham Manufacturing Company, depicts a boy sitting cross-legged with an open scroll in his lap.

== Description ==
A young boy sits with his ankles crossed and knees spread, holding a sundial in the form of a scroll in his lap; this scroll is marked in a grid of lines with month names and geographic coordinates. In his lap beneath the scroll sits a bundle of flowers. The boy's proper left hand rests on his left knee. His proper right hand, which is in contact with his head, casually holds a twig over the scroll. A wire wrapped around the end of the twig hangs straight down to the base, where it is affixed. A bronze spider is affixed to the wire in the correct place to act as the gnomon of the sundial. (The wire, twig, and spider are restorations from 2004.) The boy rests on an oval base.

=== Inscribed text ===
==== Scroll ====
Inscribed on the scroll are a grid of lines and analemmas marked with months, dates, and hours sufficient to plot the time over the course of the year, as well as a set of coordinates that mark the original location of the sculpture:

Lat 39°, 50 N 86°, 10 W Long

Inscribed on the proper left bottom corner:

Dial Marking by Albert C. Crehore, inventor

==== Base ====
Cast in relief along the edge of the base in Roman letters:

MARK YE THE HOURS OF LIGHT THAT SLIP AWAY ~ ~ ~ SPIN THEN THY HOUR OF SUNLIGHT WHILE YE MAY ~ ~ ~ ~ ~

Inscribed on the base at proper left:

© by Willard Paddock Sculptor

Scpt. | 1916 1917

PAT. FEB 26 1918-

Stamped along base rim under “WHILE”:

O. BFC GORHAM CO. FOUNDERS

== Condition ==
The bronze sculpture is monitored, cleaned, and treated regularly by the IMA art conservation staff. The surface of the bronze is protected from deterioration and corrosion by the yearly application of a fresh coat of hard wax. This sculpture was surveyed in July 1993 of as part of the Smithsonian American Art Museum's Inventories of American Painting and Sculpture database, and it was considered to be well maintained. In 2004 the IMA conservation staff undertook a major treatment of the sculpture in which the surface was repatinated to unify the color and improve its readability, and the newly fabricated wire and spider gnomon were added to restore the functionality of the sundial. In June 2011, the wire and spider are currently missing from the sundial.

== See also ==
- List of Indianapolis Museum of Art artworks
