= Quaestio Librae =

- Artist: Jerry Dane Sanders
- Year: 1975
- Type: Painted steel
- Location: Indianapolis, Indiana, United States; 39°46′01″N 86°9′10″W

Quaestio Librae (Question of Balance) is an abstract, geometric public sculpture by American artist Jerry Dane Sanders, located in front of the Indianapolis City–County Building at 200 East Washington Street in downtown Indianapolis, Indiana. The sculpture was the first contemporary sculpture to be permanently installed in downtown Indianapolis.,

== Description ==
It is a black, painted steel sculpture consisting of nine rectangular solids attached to each other at various angles. Before the artwork was installed, the former director of the Indianapolis Museum of Art, Carl J. Reinhard, declared that he thought the artwork was a "very strong and challenging work of art that would add some excitement to the City County Building complex."

== Historical information ==
The creation of the sculpture was led by the artist who raised the $20,000 needed to create the sculpture, which he began in August 1974. The sculpture was accepted as a gift to the Indianapolis-Marion County Building Authority on August 5, 1975, from Jerry Sanders. Sanders created the sculpture from donated materials, which was finally painted by Indiana Waterproofing and Protective Coating Company. The base for the sculpture was poured by Irwin Materials Company and the uplighting completed by the Commonwealth Electric Company.

Sanders first offered to donate the sculpture to the Indiana Convention Center, but this offer was declined after another artist, Stephen Wooldridge, also offered his sculpture "I" for the site. American Fletcher National Bank offered to install the artwork on their property, however the Indianapolis-Marion County Building Authority ultimately accepted the gift.

== Artist ==
Sanders was an art instructor at Warren Central High School when his artwork was installed. Born in Decatur, Illinois on September 9, 1949, Sanders attended Vincennes University and then transferred to Indiana University, where he graduated with a Bachelor of Science in Art Education in 1974. In 1978 Sanders moved to Fort Worth, Texas.

== See also ==
- Obos (fountain)
- Snowplow (di Suvero)
- Indiana Limestone (Doddoli)
- Broken Walrus I
