= Nymph and Fawn =

Public artwork by Isidore Konti

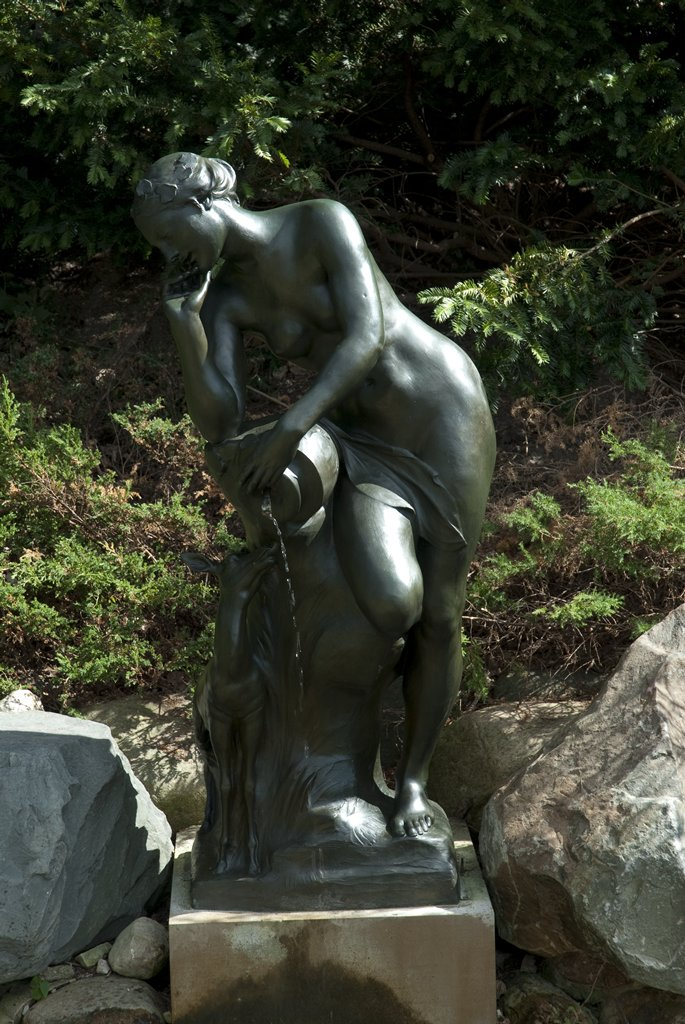
- Artist: Isidore Konti
- Year: 1917
- Dimensions: 142.9 cm × 61 cm × 51 cm (56.25 in × 24 in × 20 in)
- Location: Indianapolis Museum of Art; Indianapolis, Indiana; 39°49′36″N 86°11′0.68″W
- Owner: Indianapolis Museum of Art

Nymph and Fawn is a public artwork by American artist Isidore Konti and located within the Oldfields–Lilly House & Gardens estate on the grounds of the Indianapolis Museum of Art (IMA), near Indianapolis, Indiana. Created in 1917, the bronze sculpture is also a working fountain. It portrays a female nude pouring water from an urn while standing beside a small fawn.

== Description ==
This cast bronze sculpture group measures 56 1/4" x 24" x 20", and it is patinated a smooth dark brown. The group features a classicizing female figure (the nymph) and a fawn (young deer, rather than the classical faun usually paired with nymphs).

The nymph, coiffed with a vine and nude except for a thin band of cloth draped just below her hips, stands on her proper left leg and rests her folded right leg on a rock formation that reaches nearly as high as her hips. She leans far to her right, turning her torso just slightly downward. Her left arm crosses her body to stabilize and support a large urn resting horizontally on the rock, and her right elbow rests on the urn as she lightly supports her chin with her right hand. She peers downward at a small fawn standing below her in frontal alignment with the viewer. Its head and neck crane upward toward the urn, from which a small fountain of water trickles.

The figures and rock formation are closely positioned on a small rectangular bronze base, and the sculpture itself sits on a limestone block. It is positioned at the edge of a small pond into which the urn's water flows.

== Historical information ==
Nymph and Fawn is typical of the graceful, classical style of figuration that Isidore Konti became known for in the early 1900s. Based on a smaller, marble piece by the artist, it was originally the fountain's centerpiece.

The sculpture was surveyed in 1988 as part of the Smithsonian American Art Museum's Inventories of American Painting and Sculpture inventory.

=== Location history ===
Nymph and Fawn is located near a pond that is part of the original Oldfields Ravine Garden, an informal garden that was designed by Percival Gallagher in 1920. This landscaping project was part of a larger effort by the Olmsted Brothers landscape design firm to visually transform the Oldfields grounds at the time. Its features and plantings were rehabilitated and restored through careful research during the 1990s.

=== Acquisition ===
The sculpture was acquired by the IMA as a gift by Mr. and Mrs. John J. Weldon in 1977.

== Artist ==
Isidore Konti was born in Vienna, Austria, in 1862. Beginning at the age of sixteen, he studied art at the Vienna Academy under Edmund von Hellmer, and later continued training at the Meisterschule under Carl Kundmann until 1886. In the early 1890s, Konti emigrated to the United States and immediately began work in Chicago for the 1893 Columbian Exposition. From there he moved to New York City where he worked as a studio assistant for Karl Bitters and eventually opened his own studio.

By the early 1900s, Konti had established his reputation in the U.S. as an expert modeler through participation in several national expositions. His lyrical, decorative style was well-suited to architectural and sculptural commissions.

== See also ==
- List of Indianapolis Museum of Art artworks
- Save Outdoor Sculpture!
