= Landon-Era Birdbath =

Birdbath
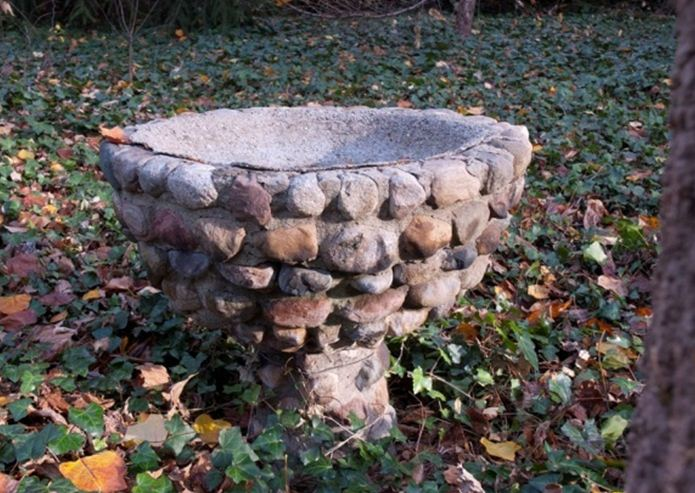
- Artist: Unknown, American
- Year: Early 20th century
- Type: Fieldstone and concrete
- Dimensions: 91 cm × 61 cm × 61 cm (36 in × 24 in × 24 in)
- Location: Indianapolis Museum of Art; Indianapolis, Indiana; 39°49′45.46″N 86°10′59.94″W
- Owner: Indianapolis Museum of Art

Birdbath, constructed of fieldstone and concrete, is an early 20th-century decorative feature on the historic Oldfields estate on the campus of the Indianapolis Museum of Art (IMA), in Indianapolis, Indiana. It is now an accessioned work of art in the collection of the IMA.

== Description ==
This birdbath is constructed from large, smooth stones laid in concentric, circular tiers, set in a thick concrete mortar. The large basin of the bath curves out from a more cylindrical pedestal that slopes out a bit toward the ground. The overall silhouette resembles a chalice. The basin is lined with a coating of concrete and has been re-lined at least once. The most recent layer is made from concrete with a larger aggregate than the finer concrete used throughout the birdbath. There is no drainage or circulation system built into the bath.

== Historical information ==
The grounds of Oldfields were landscaped by Percival Gallagher of the Olmsted Brothers in the 1920s; the birdbath presumably predates the Olmsted landscape. The property and all sculptures on it were donated to the IMA by the family of former Oldfields owner Josiah K. Lilly Jr., in 1967. In 2001 the outdoor sculptures were assessed, and eighteen selected pieces were accessioned into the IMA's Lilly House collection. Birdbath was assigned Accession Number LH2001.233.

=== Provenance ===
An undated Landon-era photograph (archived at the IMA) indicates that this birdbath has been on the Oldfields estate since the Landon era and possibly since before Gallagher's landscaping.

Nothing is known of its maker or origins. However, the materials are very similar to the original fountain base in the Formal Garden, which was constructed of similar field stone and concrete. (This can also be seen in historic photographs.) These may have been made from local materials, and perhaps they were built by the same person.

=== Location history ===
This birdbath has been on the Oldfields estate since the Landon era, when it was positioned in the middle of the scenic path along the property-bordering canal (as shown in an undated Landon-era photograph).

By 1990 the birdbath was moved for protection from traffic, as the canal path has become a utility road for IMA groundskeeping. The birdbath is now located near the path to the grounds barn.

== Condition ==
The sculpture is monitored, cleaned, and treated regularly by the IMA art conservation staff.

== See also ==
- List of Indianapolis Museum of Art artworks
