= Two Figures =

Bronze sculpture by Barbara Hepworth

- Artist: Barbara Hepworth
- Year: 1968
- Type: Bronze, edition of 7
- Dimensions: 230 cm × 120 cm × 38 cm (89 in × 49 in × 15 in)

Two Figures is a bronze sculpture by the English sculptor Barbara Hepworth, which was cast in an edition of seven copies. One of these is located at Newfields, the campus that also houses the Indianapolis Museum of Art in Indianapolis, Indiana. Other casts are at Southampton University (on loan from the Hepworth Estate), the Fred Jones Jr. Museum of Art at the University of Oklahoma, Commonwealth Park in Canberra Australia, and the Hakone Open-Air Museum, Hakone, Japan. The series were cast at the Morris Singer Foundry in London from 1968 onwards. Another cast of this work could also be found at the University of Birmingham Vale site, but is no longer present as of 2 January 2012.

== Description ==
Upon the rectilinear base stand two highly stylized figures. Each figure is somewhat lozenge-shaped and rises vertically. Each has a frontal, symmetrical, flat surface that contrasts with the gentle curve of the surfaces on the other sides. These flat surfaces are not quite parallel to the front edge of the base but instead slightly angle in toward each other. Both figures have narrow bases compared to the widths higher up, and they terminate on top with a flat, horizontal panel perpendicular to the front. The front of each figure has deep, circular holes, characteristic of Hepworth's sculptures.

Generally the bronze is smooth, with texture in the form of low-lying patches (a difference in depth similar to a thick layer of paint). It is patinated a rich dark brown color. The sculpture is seated on a limestone base.

There are subtle differences between the two figures. The one on the proper right (PR) is slightly shorter than its partner on the proper left (PL). PR's shape bows outward just above the midpoint of the figure, more than doubling its base width before tapering in again toward the top to approximately the same width as the base. The figure is filled out on the back as though the silhouette of the front face were rotated on its vertical axis, so that any given horizontal cross section would be semicircular. There are two important circular holes cut into the front surface. The higher one, placed a little less than ¾ up the height of the figure, is diametrically larger and pierces cylindrically through the entire sculpture, creating a window to the other side. The inner surface of the hole was originally patinated a dusty light green. Below it, just below ½ the height of the figure, is a slightly smaller hole that only goes about halfway through the bronze in a cylindrical fashion. This hole is lined with a bright blue paint.

PL bows gently outward from its base and reaches a maximum width at approximately the height of PR's upper hole, two thirds of the height of PL. Its upper surface is similarly flat and horizontal but is much wider than the base (in contrast to PR). PL's back side is not a uniform semicircular curve; instead it has two curving sides that meet at an acute angle to provide the figure with an overall roughly triangular horizontal cross-section. PL has three circular, cylindrical holes instead of two. The lowest, at about 1/3 of its height, does not pierce the bronze. It does not appear to have been painted or patinated. The second, at a height approximately halfway between the two holes of PR, is another non-penetrating hole painted in the same bright blue paint. The third, just above the top of the upper hole of LR, goes through all the way to the point where the cylinder intersects the sides of the sculpture but not so far as to take out the angular edge opposite the front face. The effect is that though there is only one large, round hole on the front, there are two smaller oval holes on the back, one on each surface. The interior of this hole was likewise once patinated light green. On each back surface of PL there is etched a circle roughly corresponding to the height and size of the cylindrical holes. The circle on the proper left back panel corresponds to the lowest hole, and the one on the proper right back panel lines up with the middle hole.

The first instance on record of Hepworth's Two Figures theme was a wooden artwork from 1947–1948. Artworks done in this theme she considered to represent a relationship between two living things, as opposed to her solo figures which represent a human standing in a landscape. Hepworth's bronze castings were often made from wooden originals, and even within large additions there was often intentional color variation.

== Copy at Newfields ==
=== Identifying Marks ===
The signature on the back reads "Barbara Hepworth 1968 6/7."

=== Historical information ===
As indicated by the signature on the artwork, the IMA's version of Two Figures is the sixth of seven castings. It was produced through the Morris Singer foundry in London. It was cast in 3 pieces that were then bolted together at the base. Two Figures has been on view since its arrival at the IMA. The artwork has been featured in various locations in front of the museum's main entrance, and it is currently displayed on the Sutphin Mall, facing the Sutphin Fountain and the museum building.

=== Acquisition ===
Previous to its purchase by the IMA, Two Figures was kept in the artist's collection in London. Marlborough Gallery in New York represented the Hepworth's work in the United States and sold the artwork to the IMA in 1980. It was accessioned that same year through the Henry F. and Katherine DeBoest Fund in memory of Henry F. DeBoest.

=== Condition ===
The bronze sculpture is monitored, cleaned, and treated regularly by the IMA art conservation staff. The surface of the bronze is protected from deterioration and corrosion by the yearly application of a fresh coat of hard wax. This sculpture was surveyed in July 1993 of as part of the Smithsonian American Art Museum's Inventories of American Painting and Sculpture database, and it was considered to be well maintained.

== See also ==
- List of Indianapolis Museum of Art artworks
- Save Outdoor Sculpture!
