= Two Lines Oblique Down, Variation III =

Kinetic artwork by George Rickey

- Artist: George Rickey
- Year: 1970
- Dimensions: 9.4 m × 13 m × 2.4 m (31 ft × 42 ft × 8 ft)
- Location: Indianapolis Museum of Art; Indianapolis, Indiana; 39°49′31.21″N 86°11′7.19″W
- Owner: Indianapolis Museum of Art

Two Lines Oblique Down, Variation III is a kinetic artwork by American artist George Rickey and located at the Indianapolis Museum of Art, near downtown Indianapolis, Indiana. The sculpture was made in 1970, and it is constructed from stainless steel.

== Description ==
The pendulum-inspired design of Two Lines Oblique Down, Variation III is typical of Rickey's geometric, kinetic artwork. Measured by the greatest extension of the sculpture's "arms," its size is 31' x 42' x 8'. It is constructed from at least five primary, stainless steel components which have been welded and bolted together to form linear shapes. The overall form is a Y-shaped stationary piece with two wind-powered moving pieces.

The stationary piece is square at the base and tapers up to the split of the Y. The ends of the Y are equipped with rotating joints by which the smaller moving pieces are attached to the sculpture. Each moving piece is a triangular, tapering beam that is connected at a point approximately one fourth of its length away from the wider end of the beam. Small greased bearings keep the sculpture moving freely.

Rickey relies on random wind currents to introduce movement into his sculptures, similarly to other kinetic artists such as Alexander Calder. In contrast to the biomorphic forms of Calder's mobiles, however, Rickey's linear, oscillating forms trace paths in space that reject organic motifs in favor of geometry. The large scale of Two Lines combined with the gracefulness of the sculpture's movements emphasize the relationship between space, movement, and time.

== Historical information ==
George Rickey made several editions of this sculpture during the years 1969 and 1970, and they can be found at various institutions across the United States. A copy is located in the Franklin D. Murphy sculpture garden at the University of California, Los Angeles.

=== Location History ===
Two Lines Oblique Down, Variation III was first displayed on the IMA's main terrace. A more protected arrangement for the artwork was desired, however, and it was moved to accommodate for extra surrounding space. The sculpture is positioned prominently next to the Efroymson Pavilion, the main entrance of the IMA, and encircled by an area of decorative landscaping.

=== Acquisition ===
The Indianapolis edition of Two Lines was accessioned by the Indianapolis Museum of Art in 1975 through The Orville A. and Elma D. Wilkinson Fund.

== See also ==
- List of Indianapolis Museum of Art artworks
- Save Outdoor Sculpture!
