= Observation Point (disambiguation) =

Observation Point is a large bluff in Central Port Chalmers, New Zealand

Observation Point may also refer to:

- Observation Point (Zion), a 6,507-foot elevation
- Scenic viewpoint, a location where people view scenery
- Data point, a set of at least one measurement
- Observation post, a post where soldiers watch enemy movements
