= Stratum Pier =

Public artwork by Kendall Buster

- Artist: Kendall Buster
- Year: 2010
- Type: Concrete, steel, fiberglass
- Location: Indianapolis Museum of Art; Indianapolis, Indiana, U.S.; 39°49′42.38″N 86°11′25.77″W
- Owner: Indianapolis Museum of Art

Stratum Pier is an interactive overlook by American artist Kendall Buster. The functional sculpture is located at the Virginia B. Fairbanks Art & Nature Park, part of the Indianapolis Museum of Art at Newfields.

== Description ==
Based on a section of a topographical map of 100 Acres the artwork consists of emerald green layered platforms that are shaped in a flowing organic manner along the south side of the sculpture parks lake. The artwork consists of fiberglass grids that sit upon a support system made of steel. The support system sits at varied heights. Visitors are welcome to walk on, sit, fish at and explore the structure, which is occasionally non-accessible due to flooding. The Virginia B. Fairbanks Art & Nature Park: 100 Acres

== Information ==
Stratum Pier was created to appear as if it is an extension of the shoreline, exhibiting artist Kendall Buster's desire to merge "the natural and the built environment." A visit to the structure allows one to view the cycles of erosion and growth in the 100 Acres environment, cycles that are represented in Stratum Piers layered build. Fiberglass was chosen due to its light weight allowing it to easily sit in its present location and its durability which allows for heavy use by visitors to the park. Buster started to design the piece after a visit to the park and inspiration from the topographical maps created to document the parks environment. Buster expects the work to merge with the landscape as the grass and brush that surrounds the area grows into the work.

Buster worked with architect Jeremy Olsen of Wheeler Kearns and project engineer Chris Rockey of Rockey Structures to create the piece. The artwork was commissioned by the Indianapolis Museum of Art and funded by a grant from The Indianapolis Foundation. In June 2010 Indianapolis based Motus Dance Theatre performed one day, every 45 minutes, on Stratum Pier in response to the installation and to celebrate the opening of the park.

== The artist ==
Before pursuing fine art, Kendall Buster obtained her degree in medical technology, then moved on to earning her BFA at the Corcoran College of Art and Design. After receiving her MFA from Yale University she was involved in the Whitney Museum of American Art's Independent Study Studio Program. Buster's work is described as "biological architecture" and resides in the collections of the Kreeger Museum, the Kemper Museum, Hirshhorn Museum, among others. She has been commissioned to create public art for the Walter E. Washington Convention Center, Markel Corporation, the BOK Center, Nevada Museum of Art, and many others. In 2005 Buster was awarded an American Academy of Arts and Letters Award in the Arts. Teaching at Virginia Commonwealth University, she lives and works in Richmond, Virginia.

== See also ==
- List of outdoor artworks at the Indianapolis Museum of Art
