= Scenic viewpoint =

High place for viewing scenery

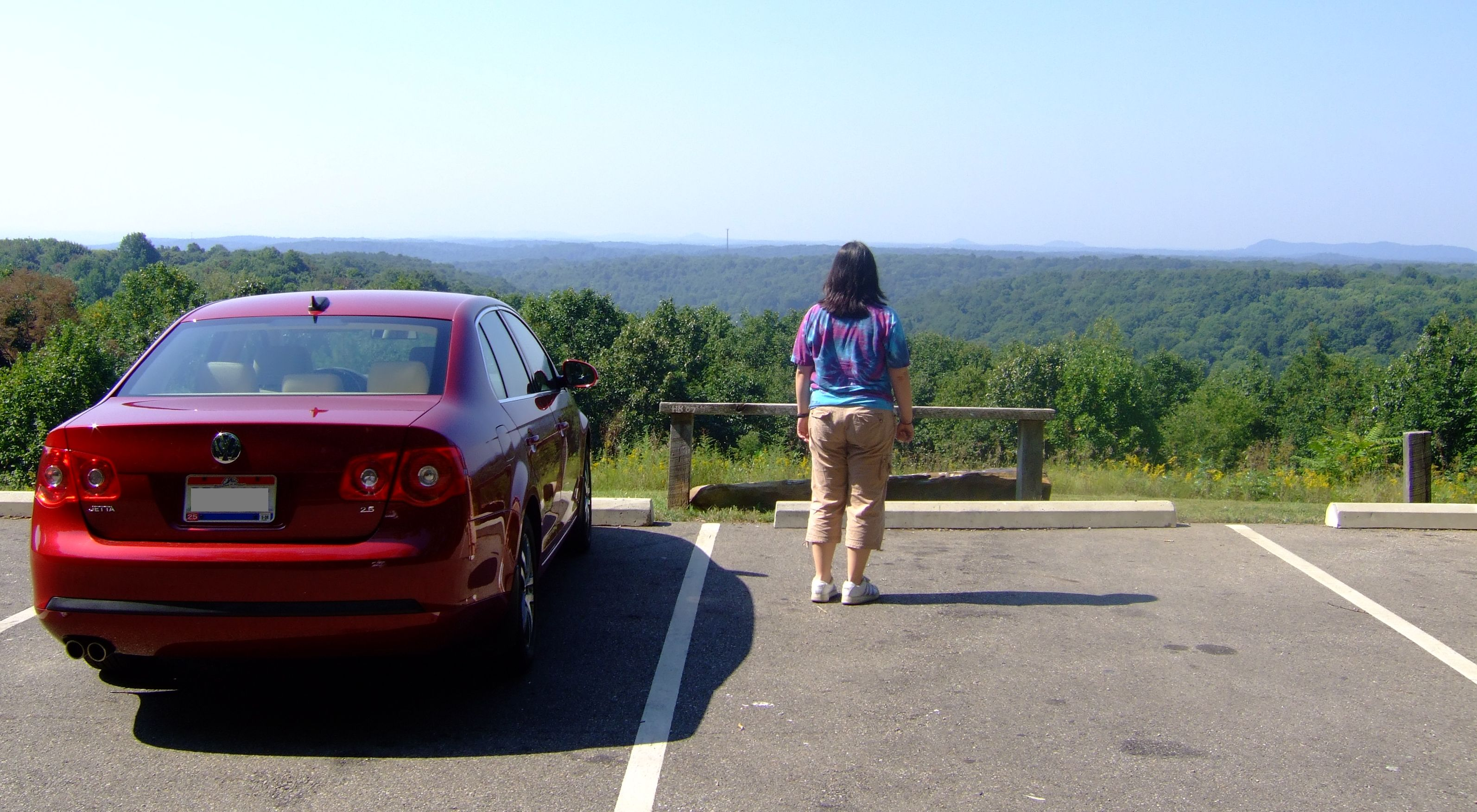
Scenic overlook in Scioto Trail State Park, Ohio

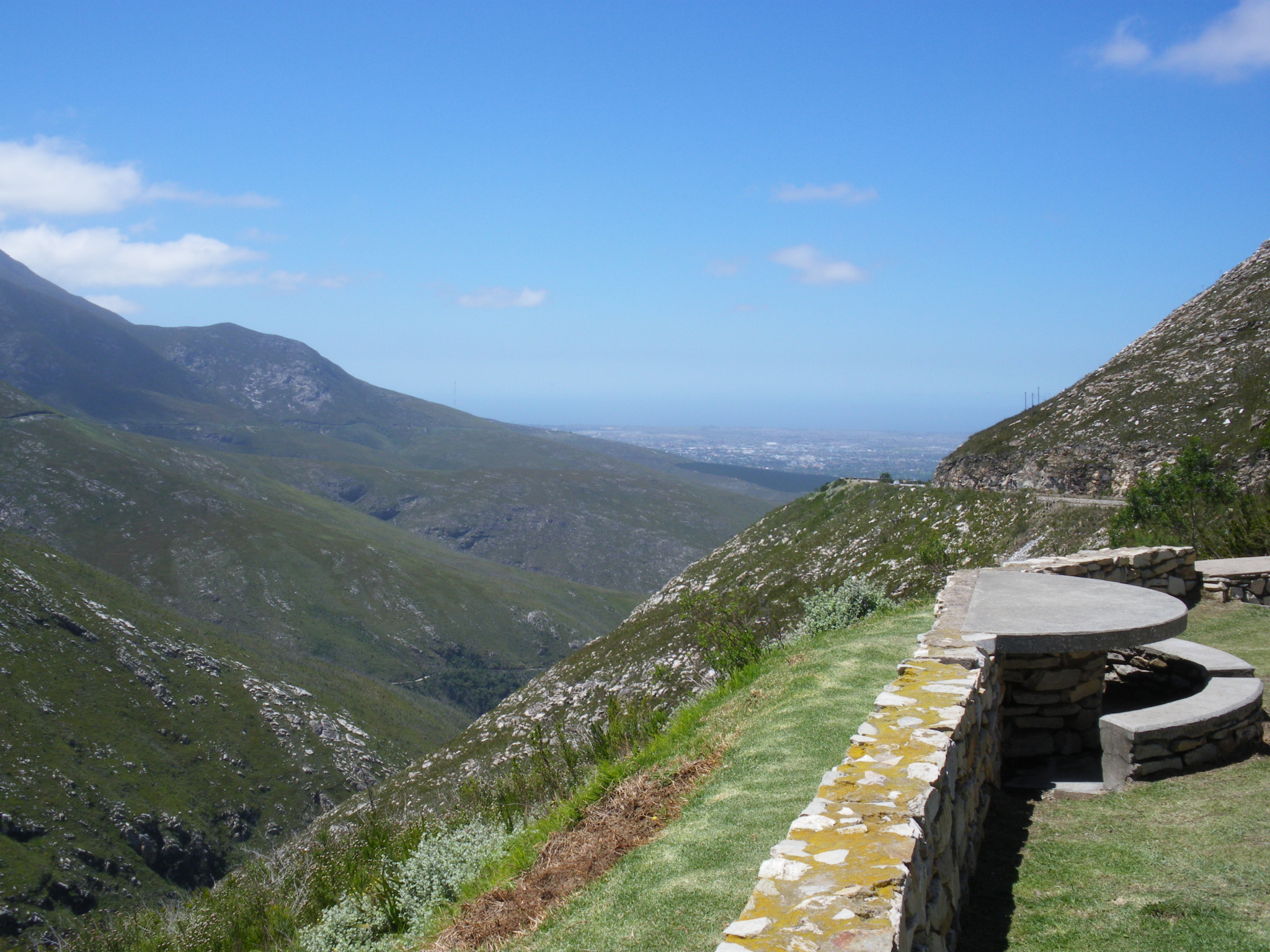
Scenic overlook in the Outeniqua Pass, South Africa, over George and the Indian Ocean. Parking and picnic tables are provided next to the road.

A scenic viewpoint—also called an observation point, viewpoint, viewing point, vista point, scenic overlook, etc.—is an elevated location where people can view scenery (often with binoculars) and photograph it. Scenic viewpoints may be created alongside scenic routes or mountain roads, often as simple turnouts or lay-bys where motorists can pull over onto pavement, gravel, or grass on the right-of-way.

== Locations ==
Many viewpoints are larger, having parking areas, while some (typically on larger highways) are off the road completely. Viewing points may also be found on hill or mountain tops or on rocky spurs overlooking a valley and reached via a hiking trail. They may be protected by railings to protect the public or be enhanced by a viewing tower designed to elevate visitors above the surrounding terrain or trees in order to offer panoramic views.

Overlooks are frequently found in national parks and in the U.S. along national parkways such as the Blue Ridge Parkway, which has numerous individually named overlooks for viewing the Blue Ridge Mountains and their valleys. Other overlooks are next to waterfalls, especially since mountain roads tend to follow streams.

Many overlooks are accessible only by trails and wooden walkways and stairs, especially in ecologically sensitive areas. These overlooks are often wooden decks, which minimize the impact on the land by reducing the need to disturb it for construction.

== History ==
The word viewpoint is from 1856, but it was thought to have been used as a physical sense in 1858. From time on, many scenic viewpoints have since become tourist attractions, with numerous vistas inscribed as world heritage-listed natural sites.

== See also ==
- Observation Point (disambiguation) for specific places called "Observation Point"
- Observation deck
- Observation post
- Stratum Pier by artist Kendall Buster
