= George Herbert Garlick =

Singaporean doctor (1886–1958)

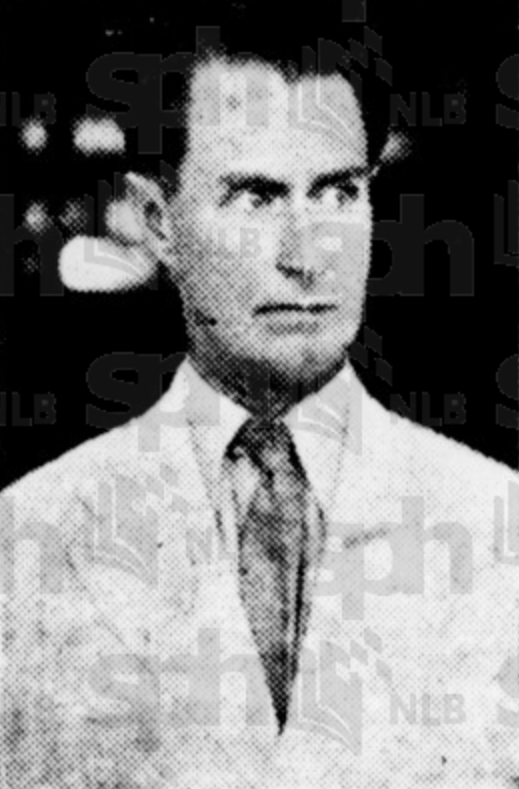
Garlick in 1939.

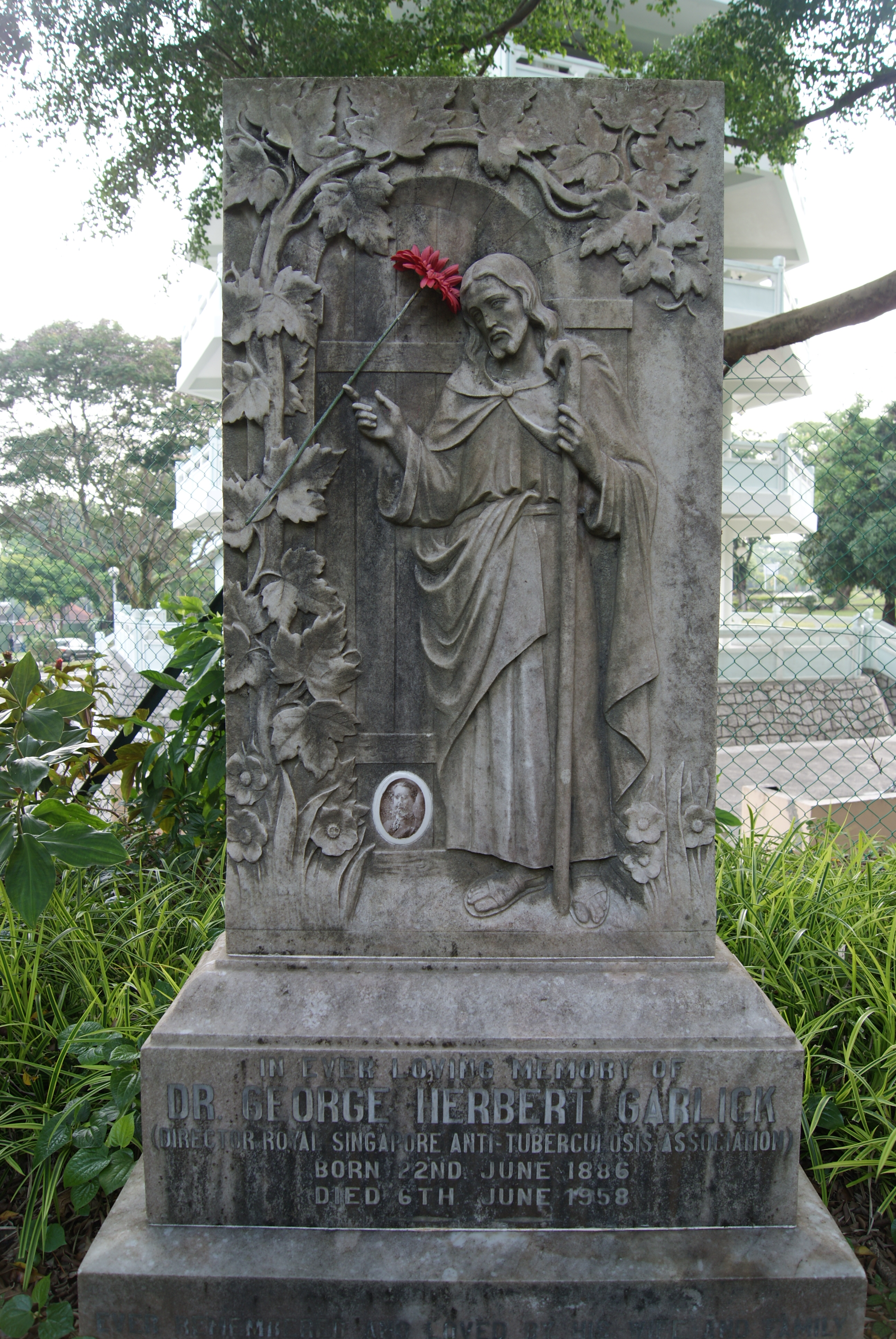
Garlick's gravestone in the now-defunct Bidadari Cemetery.

George Herbert Garlick (22 June 1886 – 6 June 1958) was the Principal Medical Officer of Johor from 1934 to 1940 and the first radiologist and medical director of the Singapore Anti-Tuberculosis Association.

== Early life and education ==
Garlick was born in London, England on 22 June 1886. His father, George Garlick, was also a doctor. He studied at the Epsom College before training at the St Mary's Hospital Medical School, qualifying in 1912. He then worked at the St Mary's Hospital as a house physician, resident anaesthetist and house surgeon. He then began serving as the assistant medical superintendent at the Highgate Hospital.

== Career ==
Garlick came to Malaya in 1914 and became the Medical Officer at a tin mine owned by Guthrie & Company in the state of Terengganu. In 1917, he became a State Medical Officer to the government of the state of Johor. He served as the assistant to the principal medical officer of the state and in this period he was one of only three medical officers in Johor. In this capacity, he was "actively engaged in hospital and public health work in the state, as well as with the medical supervision of the gaol." In 1921, Garlick acted as the Principal Medical Officer of Johor while G. P. Orme was on leave. He was again appointed to act as the Principal Medical Officer of the state when then vice Principal Medical Officer R. D. Fitzgerald went on four-months leave. In December 1927, Garlick was again appointed to act in this position. In June 1929, he was officially transferred to the position of Physician and Radiologist in Johor. He was again appointed to act as the Principal Medical Officer of Johor in July 1931 after Fitzgerald had left Malaya on leave.

In September 1934, Garlick was officially appointed the Principal Medical Officer of Johor. He was a member of the delegation sent to represent Malaya at the Ninth Congress of the Far Eastern Association of Tropical Medicine, held in Nanjing, China in October. In May of the following year, Garlick received the King George V Silver Jubilee Medal. He was appointed a member of the Johore Council of State in February 1936. On the then Sultan of Johor's 65th birthday in September 1938, Garlick was made a Dato’ Paduka Mahkota Johor. He was a member of the five-man delegation sent to represent Malaya at the Tenth Congress of the Far Eastern Association of Tropical Medicine, held in Hanoi in November. Garlick retired as Principal Medical Officer of Johor in October 1940.

After retiring, Garlick joined the British Army as a radiologist. During the Japanese Occupation of Singapore, which lasted from 1942 to 1945, he was interned at the Changi Prison. After the end of the occupation, he began serving for the British Military Administration. He was posted to the Kandang Kerbau Hospital where he re-established civil radiology, after which he served as a medical officer. He was then posted to the Singapore General Hospital as an assistant radiologist. By February 1948, Garlick had been appointed to act as the head of the hospital's Radiology Department. He wrote a book on the association, titled Royal Singapore Tuberculosis Clinic, which was published by Donald Moore Ltd. in January 1955.

By August 1948, Garlick had become the Medical Director and the Radiologist of the newly established Singapore Anti-Tuberculosis Association and its first clinic, the Royal Singapore Tuberculosis Clinic, which was to open in several weeks. He went on leave to England in 1954. While on the trip, he attended the Conference of the British Tuberculosis Association, held in Oxford, and visited several tuberculosis hospitals both in England and Copenhagen. In that year, Garlick's role as the association's radiologist was taken over by another radiologist, which allowed him to focus on serving as medical director.

Garlick's obituary in The BMJ wrote that the Singapore Anti-Tuberculosis Association's clinic and services "stand as a permanent memorial to his unselfish and humanitarian work" and that it was his "vision, tenacity of purpose, unremitting toil, and human interest which built up in Singapore an institution worthy of the cause it serves."

== Personal life and death ==
Garlick had married by 1918. His daughter was born in Hong Kong on 8 February of that year. Their son was born at the Maternity Hospital in Singapore on 8 December of the following year. Garlick married Estonian sculptor Dora Gordine in Singapore on 19 September 1930.

In 1955, Garlick went on six months' leave. He and his wife were to stay in Switzerland before leaving for England. He was to attend the fifth National Association for the Prevention of Tuberculosis Commonwealth Chest Conference, held in London. However, he suffered a heart attack while in Switzerland and died at the Lucerne General Hospital on 6 June 1958. He was buried at the Bidadari Cemetery.
