= Richard Hare =

Richard Hare may refer to:

- R. M. Hare (1919–2002), English moral philosopher
- Richard Hare (bishop) (1922–2010), suffragan bishop of Pontefract
- Richard Hare, 4th Earl of Listowel (1866–1931), Irish peer and British Army officer
- Richard Gilbert Hare (1907–66), British professor of Russian Literature
