= La Hermana del Hombre Bóveda =

Public artwork by Pablo Serrano

- Artist: Pablo Serrano
- Year: 1963
- Dimensions: 100 cm × 61 cm × 94 cm (40 in × 24 in × 37 in)
- Location: Indianapolis Museum of Art; Indianapolis, Indiana; 39°49′34.43″N 86°10′59.23″W
- Owner: Indianapolis Museum of Art

La Hermana del Hombre Bóveda is a public artwork by Spanish artist Pablo Serrano, located at Newfields, the museum campus that houses the Indianapolis Museum of Art near downtown Indianapolis, Indiana. The artwork is an abstract bronze piece which tops a granite fountain.

== Description ==
La Hermana del Hombre Bóveda is an abstract, figural, cast bronze artwork. The form wraps around a central cavity, which is the focal point when viewed from the front. Jutting edges that look as though they were ripped or chopped face the front, surrounding the circular cavity and contrasting with its smooth, hollowed surface.

The highly textured surface curves around the back to create a rounded form that evokes a woman's backside. The texture is consistently applied, with sporadic scratches creating emphasis and texture throughout. The artwork was originally patinated a medium brown color, unevenly applied to emphasize texture and form. The highly polished central cavity originally had a bright, golden sheen – the natural color of the bronze. The polished and patinated surfaces were intended to play off of each other; the edge of the polished circle was slightly feathered into the rich brown.

The artwork is currently mounted on a granite base which is part of a fountain; the fountain rests on a limestone base. The artwork is secured to the top of the fountain by means of a custom-made piece of steel which is hooked to the edges of the hollow bottom of the artwork. This steel piece has fittings so that it and the bronze can be rotated and then lifted off of the fountain. The bronze element itself weighs approximately 450 lbs.

=== Identifying marks ===
The artwork is signed at the bottom proper left edge “Serrano”.

== Historical information ==
La Hermana del Hombre Bóveda was hollow cast in a multi-part mold in Madrid in 1963.

=== Location history ===
La Hermana was installed as the central attraction of one of the IMA's most prominent accessibility projects - the Garden for Everyone. This garden made its debut in 1993, located at the east end of the Sutphin Mall in front of the museum. It was designed specifically for people with disabilities, and it creates a full sensory experience with fragrant flowers, various textures of stone and landscaping, and a gentle fountain, upon which La Hermana rests. This has been the artwork's display location since its accession into the museum's collection.

=== Acquisition ===
La Hermana was donated to the IMA from the Joseph Cantor Collection in 1987. It was accessioned in the same year.

== Condition ==
The Smithsonian American Art Museum's Inventories of American Painting and Sculpture surveyed La Hermana del Hombre Bóveda, and the sculpture was deemed to be well-maintained.

== See also ==
- List of Indianapolis Museum of Art artworks
- Save Outdoor Sculpture!
