= Memories of Prague =

- Artist: David Louis Rodgers
- Year: 1983-1985
- Type: Limestone
- Dimensions: 130 cm × 110 cm × 110 cm (50 in × 44 in × 44 in)
- Location: Indianapolis Museum of Art; Indianapolis, Indiana; 39°49′33.88″N 86°11′11.35″W
- Owner: Indianapolis Museum of Art

Memories of Prague is a public artwork by American artist David Louis Rodgers, the Indianapolis Museum of Art at Newfields (IMA), which is near downtown Indianapolis, Indiana.

== Description ==
This artwork is composed of two limestone elements, each being hand-carved by the artist. The upper element is a three-sided openwork triangular that sits on the second element, a cylindrical pedestal. The top form looks twisted as it loops over the open space like a handle. The bottom part of the “handle” which contacts the pedestal is flattened out into an oval.

The artwork is carved out of a very porous and stratified Indiana limestone. The colors range from mute grays to browns.

== Historical information ==
In 1981 Rodgers was chosen to create Memories of Prague as a memorial to Louisa K. Valentine. Valentine was born in Prague but moved to escape the war in 1945. She met her husband, Joseph Valentine, while he was stationed overseas, and when the war was over they moved to the Indiana. Mrs. Valentine loved the Indianapolis Museum of art, volunteering regularly. In 1978 she died, and in her honor her family commissioned an artwork that was to be displayed in the IMA's collection. The specifications were for the artist to be a Hoosier, it was to be made from Indiana limestone, and the title must have to do with Prague.

When Rodgers was selected to make the artwork, he was faculty member of the Interior Design Program at IU of Pennsylvania in Indiana, Penn. He communicated directly with Robert Yassin during the planning stages of the commission. In 1981 Rodgers was hoping to make a sundial, but the design had to be scrapped because the funds provided were not enough to cover the complexities involved in the construction of such an object. A few years later his dream of making a sundial became possible with a large commission by Crown Hill Cemetery as the Equatorial Sundial. For the Valentine commission, Rodgers ended up carving a Mobius strip-styled arch which recalled the arched doorways and bridges common in Prague.

According to Rodgers, “the Valentine Memorial emerged as an expression of continuity and fulfillment as those of involved in it attempted to grasp the understanding that death completes life and that we as survivors retain within us something of the essence of the people with whom we spend our lives. The creation of a memorial provides the occasion for people to join together, if they choose to, to begin a search for an expression that will in the end be a celebration of many distilled remembrances, which are the essence of intimate contact.”

=== Location history ===
The artwork has been on constant view at the top of the landing of the outdoor amphitheater since 1985.

=== Acquisition ===
Memories of Prague was received at the IMA in May 1985. It was accessioned the same year, and in November the artwork was given a dedication ceremony, also in honor of Mrs. Valentine.

== Artist ==
Rodgers is an Indiana native who went to IU to become an astronomer. Partway through earning his degree, he switched to art (painting) and it wasn't until he was in graduate school that he set his mind on becoming a sculptor. In 1968 Rodgers earned his MFA, and he then moved to New Mexico to teach art. In 1971 he returned to Indiana, teaching stone-carving workshops including a class at Bedford-North Lawrence High School. Throughout his career, he designed, created, installed, and otherwise assisted in the making of site specific artworks.

He has taught at many universities in the United States, and was faculty at Valdosta State University until 2008.

== See also ==
- List of Indianapolis Museum of Art artworks
- Save Outdoor Sculpture!
