= Orange Curves =

Public sculpture by Brent Gann

- Artist: Brent Gann
- Year: 2000; 26 years ago
- Type: Painted Steel
- Dimensions: 120 cm × 91 cm × 120 cm (4 ft × 3 ft × 4 ft)
- Location: Indianapolis, Indiana, United States; 39°46.385′N 86°10.515′W
- Owner: Indiana University-Purdue University Indianapolis

Orange Curves, a public sculpture by American artist Brent Gann, is located on the Indiana University-Purdue University Indianapolis campus, which is near downtown Indianapolis, Indiana. Orange Curves is an abstract metal sculpture consisting of three steel curves that have been welded together at angles creating a three-dimensional composition. The entire sculpture has been painted orange. It is located on the north side of the lecture hall which is located at 325 University Blvd.

== Description ==
Orange Curves consists of three cast steel curves welded together. When looking at the proper front of the sculpture the middle curve appears to be the link between the bottom and top curves. This middle curve resembles a backward "c" with the top curve looped through the top of the inverted "c" and the bottom curved looped through the bottom middle portion of the same middle curve. Both the bottom and the middle curves are attached to the base with additional pieces of steel which have been bolted into the concrete base. The composition does not appear to suggest anything representational. Each curve is similar in size in shape but are not identical. The entire sculpture, except the attaching bolts, has been painted orange. An image on the artist's website indicates that this sculpture was exhibited inside in another context sometime before it was installed in its present location.

Metal is often cast, welded or both to create a sculpture. Orange curves shows evidence of both. To cast metal it must be heated in a forge to a temperature above melting point, then it is taken from the forge and poured into a mold. This mold can be made of a variety of materials ranging from metal to ceramic, but the mold must be carefully reinforced to prevent it from breaking or leaking as the metal cools and hardens. Welding is a process that joins two pieces of metal in a strong joint by applying heat and sometimes pressure that cools to form the joint. After the joint cools there is a joint line consisting filler metal and the metal of the two pieces that have been joined. Steel is an alloy, that is, it is a composite of more than one metal. The specific proportions of the different types of metal in steel can make it a very challenging material to work with.

== Artist ==
Brent Gann is an American artist who obtained B.F.A.'s in both visual communication and sculpture from Herron School of Art and Design in 2000. He also received a certificate in computer science in 2002. He has worked as a graphic designer on many projects for Pathology Multimedia Education Group, Hedges and Associates, Beauty and Beasts and Shock Therapy TV among others since 1999.

== Documentation ==
A Museum Studies course at IUPUI recently undertook the project of researching and reporting on the condition of 40 outdoor sculptures on the university campus. Orange Curves was included in this movement. This documentation was influenced by the successful Save Outdoor Sculpture! 1989 campaign organized by Heritage Preservation: The National Institute of Conservation partnered with the Smithsonian Institution, specifically the Smithsonian American Art Museum. Throughout the 1990s, over 7,000 volunteers nationwide have cataloged and assessed the condition of over 30,000 publicly accessible statues, monuments, and sculptures installed as outdoor public art across the United States.

== See also ==
- Abstract Art
- Minimalism
- Vault
