= Dora Gordine =

Estonian-British artist (1895–1991)

- Born: 8 June 1895; Liepāja, Courland Governorate, Russian Empire
- Died: 29 December 1991 (aged 96); Kingston upon Thames, London, England
- Known for: Painting, sculpture, interior design
- Notable work: Happy Baby, Mother and Child, head sculptures, Dorich House
- Awards: Fellow of Royal British Society of Sculptors (FRBS), Society of Portrait Sculptors

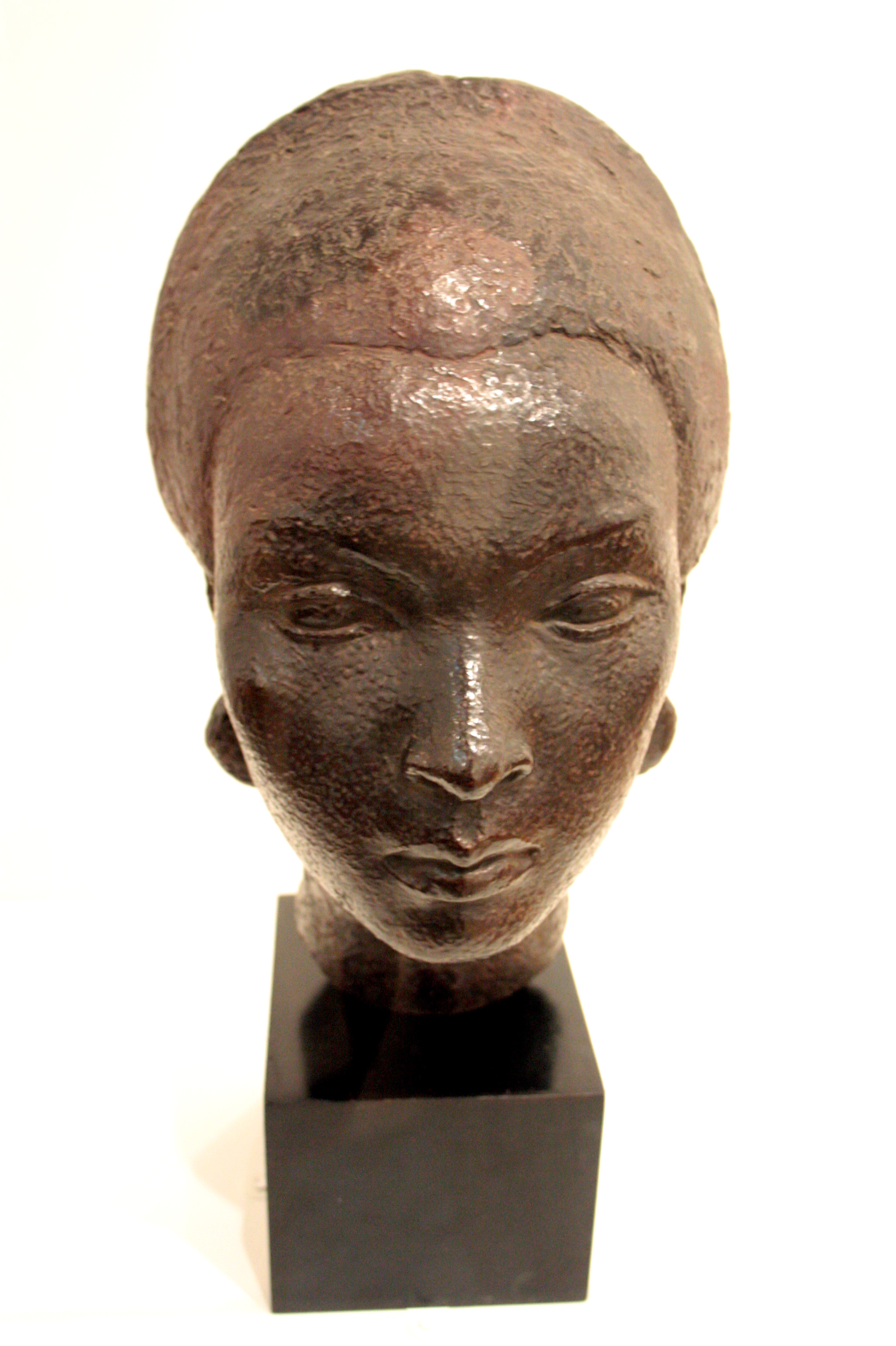
Guadaloupe Head by Dora Gordine, 1928, Tate

Dora Gordine (8 June 1895 – 29 December 1991) was an Estonian Jewish Modernist figurative and portraitist sculptor, who from the 1920s on mostly worked in France and England. Her early career was influenced by the Noor Eesti (‘Young Estonia’) group of artists who favoured Art Nouveau. She moved to Paris and on her third marriage, to Hon. Richard Hare (1907–66), her career expanded to the extent that some critics regarded her as amongst the finest sculptors of her generation. She specialized in portrait sculptures attracting international admirers from the political, social, artistic, literary and theatrical worlds. Her legacy also includes a number of public space pieces. Her latter career was not as prolific or as fêted and Gordine was relatively unknown at the time of her death. Major exhibitions in London in 2006 and 2009 have revived her standing and her former home, Dorich House, just outside Richmond Park, is now a museum.

== Early life ==
Dora Gordine's childhood has not been well documented. There is confusion over her date of birth with various dates 1895 (likely), 1898 and 1906 mentioned. She was the youngest of four children born to Morduch ("Mark") Gordin and Emma Ester Schepshelewitch, both Russian Jews, in Liepāja, Latvia, at a time when it was still part of the Russian Empire. Two of her siblings, Nikolai and Anna, died at the hands of the Nazis in Tallinn, Estonia in 1941. Another brother, Leopold, moved to London, where he lived until his death. The Gordin family evidently belonged to a comfortable middle class. There was money available to pay Gordine's elder brother, Leopold, to study engineering at Edinburgh University. Later, it seems that Gordine's father was also prepared to pay for Gordine's elder sister, Anna, to study at one of Tallinn's leading art schools.

By 1912 the Gordin family had moved to Tallinn, Estonia. It is clear that Gordine's approach to sculpture was considerably shaped by the example of the pre-First World War Noor Eesti (‘Young Estonia’) a group of artists who championed Art Nouveau in the country. She exhibited bronze sculptures in Tallinn in 1917, 1920 and 1921. In the autumn of 1924 she went to Paris to study a course in French civilisation, improving her knowledge of contemporary French sculptural practice. Then, surrounded by galleries and salons, she "instinctively felt a correlation between the rhythms of music and sculpture" and developed her sculptural vision. Gordin gallicised her surname by adding an "e" perhaps in an effort to make it sound more Russian and always denied or deflected suggestions that she was Jewish.

In 1925 she worked as a painter on a mural for the British Pavilion at the International Exhibition of Modern Decorative and Industrial Arts, in Paris. It provided the means to cast a bronze for exhibition at the Beaux Arts Society. The following year she was invited to exhibit at the Salon des Tuileries where her design of the head & torso of a Chinese philosopher earned enthusiastic reviews; The Straits Times (1932) wrote: "Like Byron, one morning Dora Gordine woke up famous". Between 1929 and 1935 she sculpted bronzes for the City Hall, Singapore. Leicester Galleries in London presented Gordine's sculpture in a solo show in 1928. It was a huge success and all her work was sold, amongst which was Javanese Head bought by Samuel Courtauld for the Tate Gallery collection.

== Marriage ==
After a brief marriage to a Wladimir Rolow in Estonia, in 1930 she married Englishman Dr George Herbert Garlick in Singapore. In 1936 she married her third husband, the Hon. Richard Gilbert Hare (5 September 1907 – 1966), son of Richard Granville Hare, 4th Earl of Listowel and Freda Vanden-Bempde-Johnstone on 21 November 1936. Through her marriage she became part of a liberal aristocratic cultural elite. The independent income from Hare allowed Dora to build Dorich House in Kingston Vale, her studio and a showcase for her work. As well as, a showcase for their collections of Indian, Chinese and nineteenth-century Russian art and furniture.

== Career ==
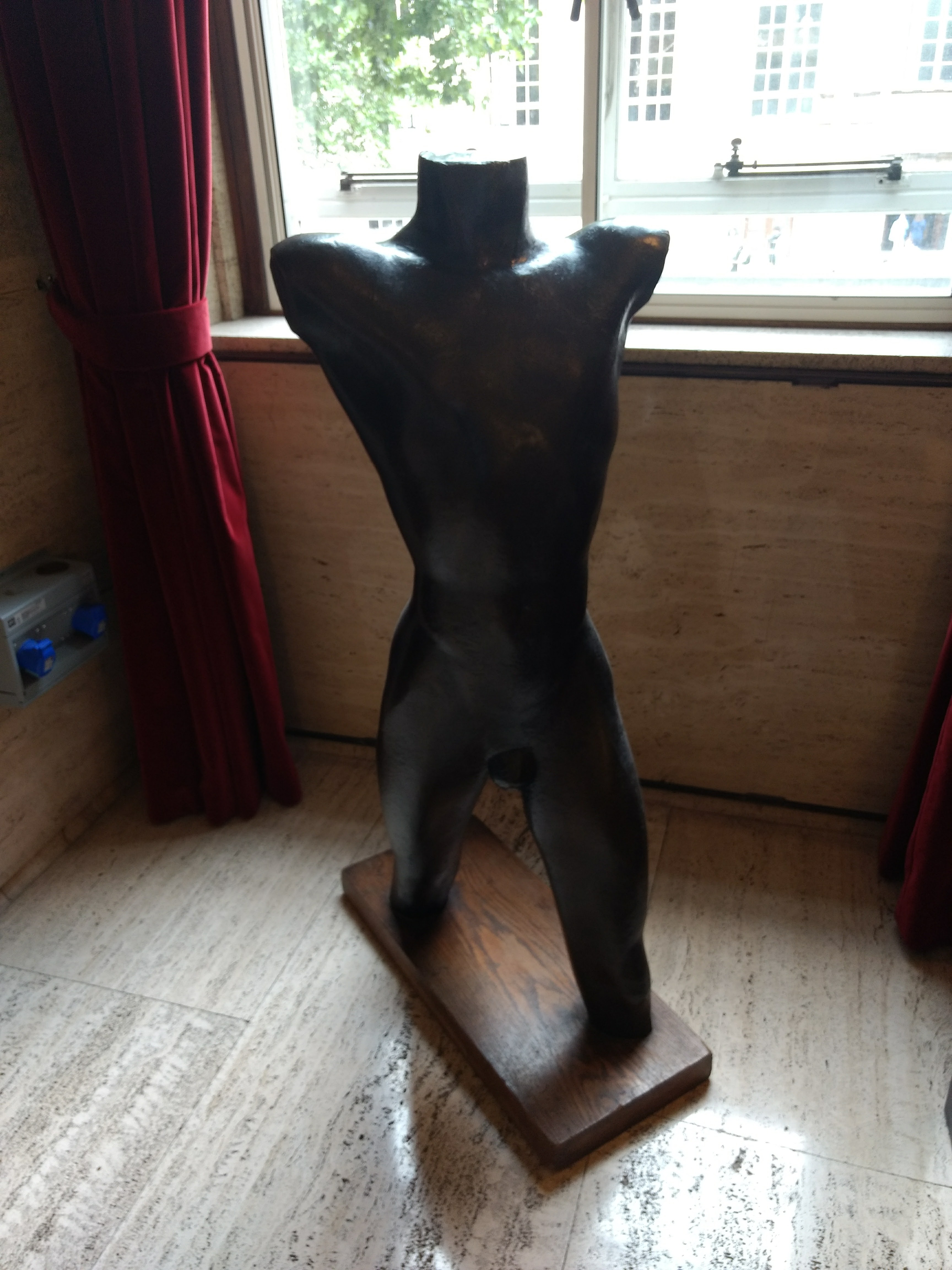
Male Torso, Dora Gordine, Senate House, University of London.

Her husband introduced her to London society figures, many of whom sat for her, Dame Edith Evans, Dame Beryl Grey, Dorothy Tutin, Siân Phillips, Emlyn Williams, Sir Kenneth Clark, John Pope-Hennessy and Professor F. Brown, Head of the Slade School of Art. There were also overseas commissions including the Kwa Nin, whose head sculpture Gordine called The Chinese Lady of Peace and a low-relief at Gray's Inn to Sun Yat-Sen, the former leader of China.

Each portrait head had its own patina according to Gordine's vision of her sitter. When interviewed by the BBC in 1972 Gordine commented that, "when you do portrait busts of somebody you do their noses and mouth – but it is nothing. You have to imagine what they are like inside and bring out their inner feeling and then put it in a form".

At the outbreak of World War II, Gordine's career was brought to a halt. She no longer had access to Valsuani's in Paris, her favourite foundry, and bronze quickly became rationed. All foundries in Britain were ordered stop all non-essential activity and concentrate on war production. It was not until late 1943 or early 1944 that she found a new foundry and was able to have some of her latest bronze work exhibited in the Royal Academy in 1944. During the 1940s/50s Gordine's work was exhibited regularly at the Royal Academy, the Society of Portrait Sculptors and elsewhere. In October 1945 she had a solo exhibition at the Leicester Galleries, in which The Times described her as having ‘much ability, though she is eclectic in her inspiration, being influenced by works from many schools and periods – Indian and Egyptian among others. Her best works are her portrait heads in bronze which are convincing and straightforward.’ Bronzes from this time have ironic or humorous titles, relating to the pose, such as Great Expectations or Mischief and, of an RAF officer, Above Cloud. She was elected a Fellow of the Royal British Society of Sculptors in 1949. She occasionally did exotic or erotic pieces (e.g. for Elizabeth Choy). She travelled and lectured in America, working in Hollywood, art lecturing and designing film sets in 1947 and revisited the US in 1959.

In 1948 she was commissioned to produce a sculpture to stand in the new mother and baby unit at Holloway Prison in north London, paid for by the City financier and former suffragette Gordon Holmes. Happy Baby was largely forgotten by 2009, languishing in an administration block at the prison for many years. Now regarded as an important piece in 'La Gordine's' professional history it formed the centre piece of an exhibition of her work at Kingston University in February–March 2009. Her work was also part of the sculpture event in the art competition at the 1948 Summer Olympics.

In 1960 Esso commissioned a 2.1 m x 1.5 m (7' x 5') low-relief Power for their new Milford Haven Refinery, which was unveiled by the Duke of Edinburgh. Gordine's last public commission, the 2–5 m (8') long Mother and Child was made for the entrance hall of the Royal Marsden Hospital, Surrey, in 1963.

== Widowhood and death ==
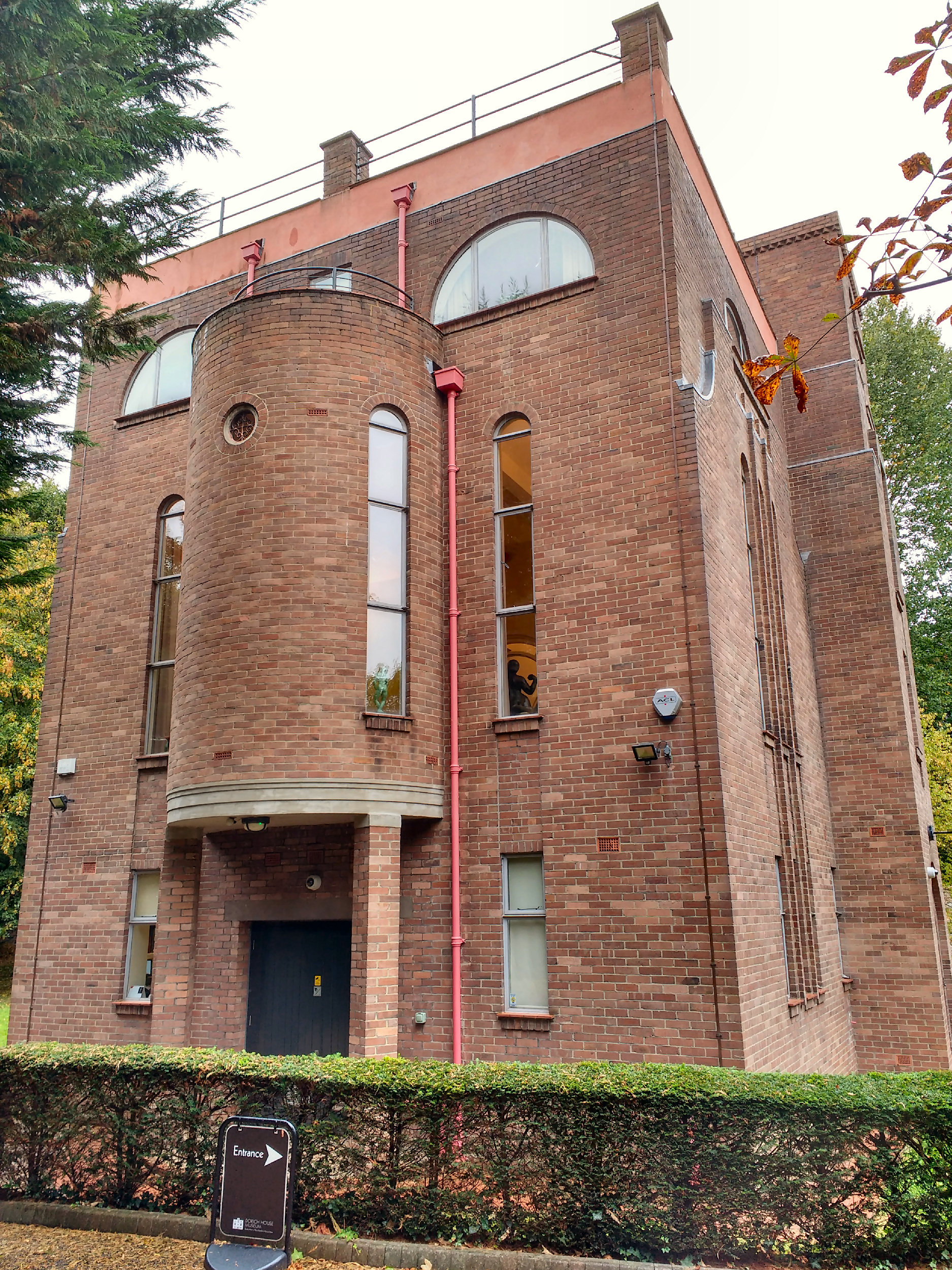
Kingston Hill, Dorich House Museum

Her husband's sudden death in 1966 from a heart attack left Gordine to live out her life alone in Dorich House. She had no children. As Gordine's client base became smaller and health problems undermined her ability to work to the standard she had during the 1920s, her eyesight deteriorated and she had arthritis in her shoulders and arms causing her career to end in the 1970s. She had a great interest in her garden and, in particular, herbs and plants used for medicinal purposes, such as Tansy. Adrian Howes and Robert Ruthven were her part-time gardeners for nearly two years in the mid-1970s. She often invited the members of the Royal Ballet School to Dorich house to pose for her. She died in Dorich House in December 1991, aged around 96.

In subsequent years her work was to be revived by major exhibitions in London in 2006 at the Ben Uri Gallery in the Jewish Museum London, and in 2009 at Dorich House and Kingston University.

== Dorich House ==
Dorich House was designed by Gordine and completed in 1936. The name chosen for the house was a portmanteau of Dora and Richard's names. The house is spread across three floors; the ground and first floors devoted to the production and display of Gordine's work, with the upper floor forming the couple's private apartment. In 1994, it was acquired by Kingston University and was refurbished and formally opened as a museum in 1996, housing Gordine's collection of bronze and plaster sculptures and many of her paintings and drawings. There are also items from Hare's Imperial Russian art collection, which includes icons, paintings, ceramics, glassware, metalwork, folk art and furniture dating from the early 18th century to the early 20th century.

== Major exhibitions ==
- Salon de Tuileries, Paris (1926, 1933)
- Leicester Galleries, London (1928, 1933, 1938, 1945, 1949)
- Royal Academy of Arts (1937–1941, 1944–1950, 1952–1960)
- Battersea Park Arts Council (1948)
- Fine Art Society, London (1986)
- Jewish Museum London (2006)
- Kingston University, London (2009)
