= Willard Dryden Paddock =

American artist (1873–1956)

Willard Dryden Paddock (October 23, 1873 – November 25, 1956), was an American painter and sculptor. Born in Brooklyn, New York, he studied at the Pratt Institute in Brooklyn under the tutelage of sculptor Herbert Adams, before traveling to Paris to study at the Académie Colarossi under the painters Gustave-Claude-Etienne Courtois and Louis Auguste Girardot. Paddock is perhaps better known for his sculptural work, which garnered national attention, and included memorial structures, fountains, busts, figures, and sundials.

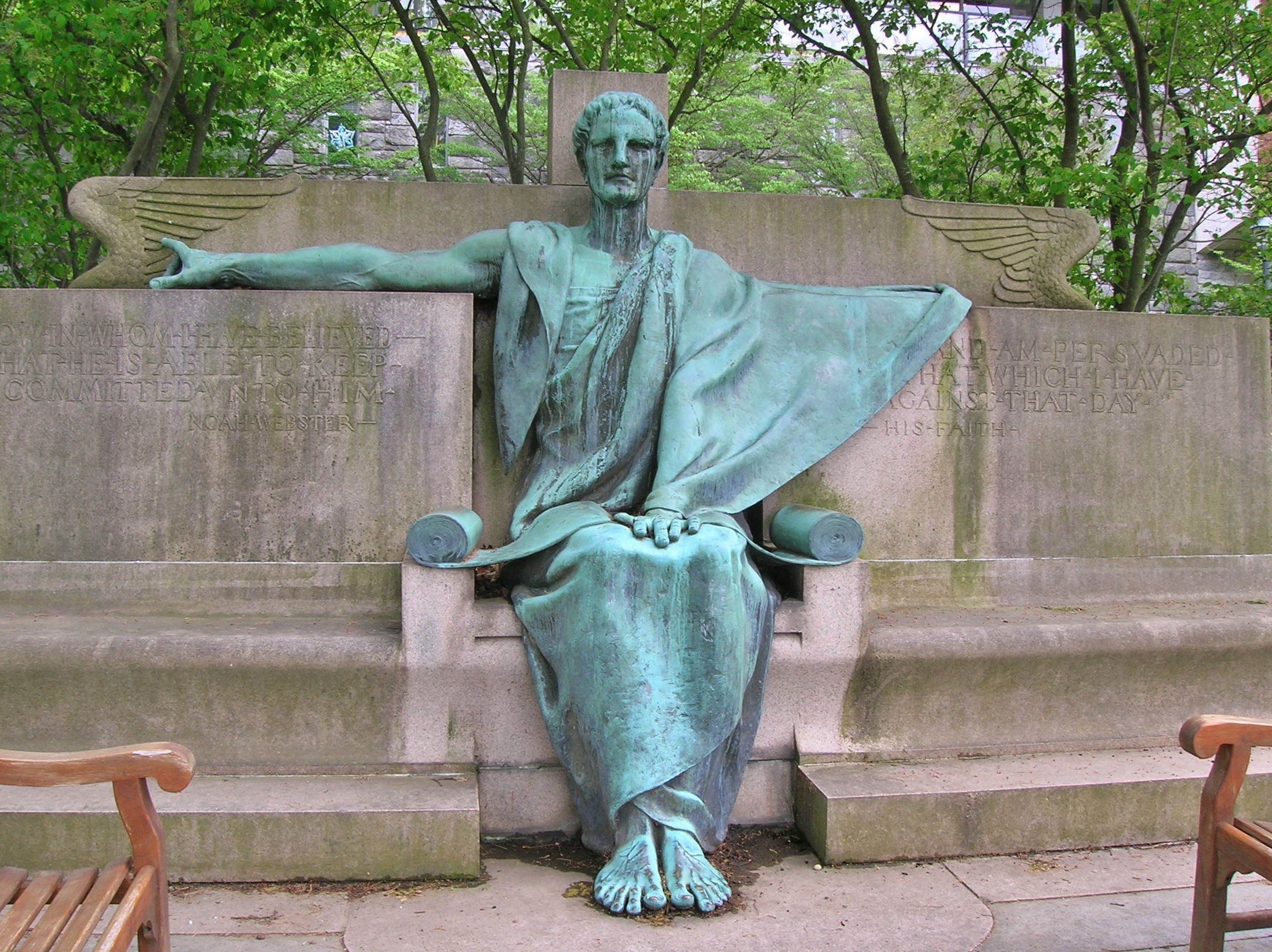
Noah Webster (1914), Amherst, Massachusetts

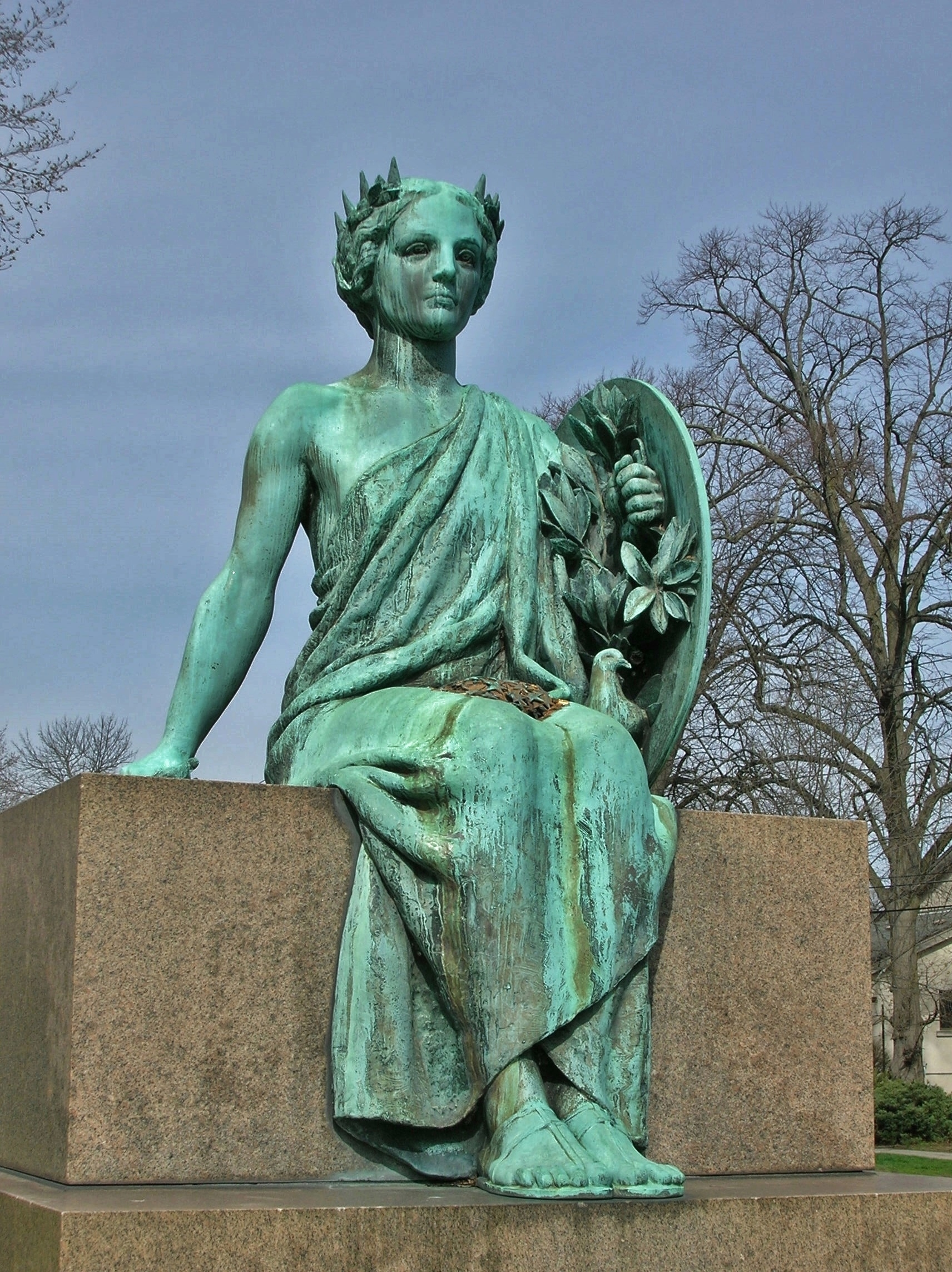
War Memorial (1931), Stratford, Connecticut

== Selected works ==
Sundial, Boy With Spider, bronze sundial, 1916–1918; Owner: Indianapolis Museum of Art

Certain other sculptures by Paddock were surveyed and documented by the "Save Outdoor Sculpture!" project.
