= Obos (fountain) =

- Artist: George Tsutakawa
- Year: 1971
- Type: Fountain
- Dimensions: 610 cm (240 in)
- Location: Seattle, Washington
- Owner: John Braseth

Obos is a sculptural fountain that was commissioned for the Jefferson Plaza in front of the Jefferson National Life Building at 3 Virginia Avenue in downtown Indianapolis, Indiana. The hammered silicon bronze fountain was designed by George Tsutakawa and dedicated on September 9, 1971, but removed in 2008. In 2012 it was purchased by John Braseth, a Seattle art dealer, who has restored it in preparation for public display in the Seattle, Washington area.

== Description ==
The bronze fountain consists of multiple elements that appear to be stacked to form a tall abstract form with multiple water jet elements to create a fountain. The fountain has five main components, each of which are in an abstracted, lotus-like forms: a four-legged base, two rectilinear middle sections, an inverted four-legged base element with a smaller four-legged element in the center. It originally had a water capacity of 6,000 US gallons (23,000 L; 5,000 imp gal) and recirculated 2,000 US gallons (7,600 L; 1,700 imp gal) a minute. The name "obos" relates to formations or stacks of rocks made by travelers in the Himalayas.

== Historical information ==
The sculptural fountain was commissioned by E. Kirk McKinney, who was at the time the president of Jefferson National Life Insurance. The fountain was on display in Jefferson Plaza for more than 40 years, until the building was sold to Allen Commercial Group, and the fountain was ultimately removed in 2008 to make room for outdoor seating of a new restaurant. The sculpture was purchased in 2012 by John Braseth, who hired Fabrication Specialties of Seattle to begin restoring and re-plumbing the fountain. It has not yet been re-installed by Braseth.

== See also ==
- Quaestio Librae
- Snowplow (di Suvero)
