= Sutphin Fountain =

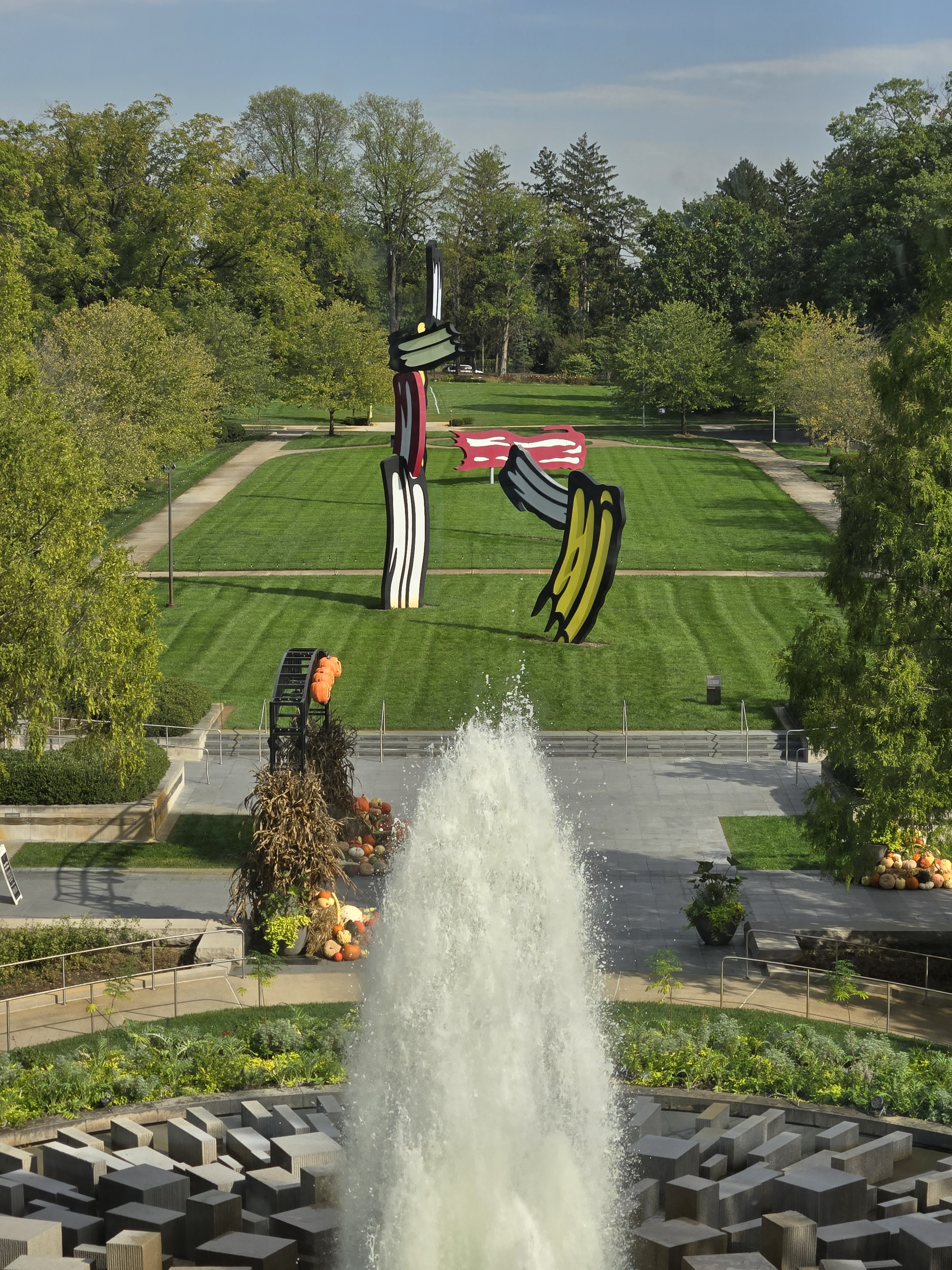
- Artist: Stuart O. Dawson (Sasaki, Dawson, DeMay Associates, Inc.)
- Year: 1972
- Location: Indianapolis Museum of Art; Indianapolis, Indiana; 39°49′33.29″N 86°11′5.54″W
- Owner: Indianapolis Museum of Art

The Sutphin Fountain is a fountain located at the Newfields campus, directly adjacent to the Indianapolis Museum of Art (IMA), which is near downtown Indianapolis, Indiana. The granite and concrete fountain was designed by Stuart O. Dawson of Sasaki, Dawson, DeMay Associates, Inc. (now Sasaki Associates) in 1972.

== Description ==
The Sutphin Fountain is a year-round fountain located just north of the IMA's main entrance, heading off the stretch of landscaping called the Sutphin Mall.

Its large circular basin contains a poured concrete platform upon which sit 352 blocks of handcrafted, white granite of varying sizes, some weighing over a ton. Each block is flat on top and narrow, vertical ridges have been carved into the sides. The platform is raised slightly higher than ground level, and slopes slightly upward towards the center. A drainage basin surrounds the platform and serves as a barrier for the garden.

In the center of the platform 27 high-powered jets of water are fed from a central pipe and spray straight up into the air at a height anywhere between eight and 15 feet. Approximately 10,000 gallons of water are pumped through the jets every minute.

Color-shifting LED lights illuminate the column of water at night, and colorful lights are also installed underneath the ledge of the platform.

== Historical information ==
The Sutphin Fountain was made following the IMA's move from 16th to 38th Street. It was completed in 1972 in celebration of the IMA's second birthday at its new location. The museum held an open dedication ceremony in October 1972, complete with a brass band, fireworks, and ballerinas who danced across the fountain itself. At the moment of unveiling, the fountain sent one narrow jet of water 50 feet into the air.

The original incarnation of the fountain had 448 blocks of Indiana limestone, a limestone rim surrounding the central platform, and 22 floodlights which lit the fountain from within the column of water at night.

First located at the bottom of the steps leading up to the IMA's main entrance, the Sutphin Fountain was the visual focal point of the front view of the museum complex. Its design was intended to recall the age-old sunburst design and also suggest the layout of Indianapolis, nicknamed the “Circle City.” The IMA's logo for its first few decades was a simplified version of an aerial view of the fountain.

When the IMA reopened in 2005 following its major renovation, the role of the Sutphin Fountain was altered. Where it used to be a stark gateway to the museum, it now was nestled in a more landscaped setting – although still prominently visible from the main entrance. It is now comfortably situated between the museum café's outdoor seating and the Sutphin Mall, an allée-style sculpture yard which contains some of the IMA's most well-known outdoor artworks.

In 2009 the floodlights within the fountain were replaced with LED lighting. Seventeen different hues can be seen as the colors rotate at night, and specific color cycle requests may be displayed during special events.

=== Acquisition ===
The Sutphin Fountain is dedicated in memory of Samuel Brady Sutphin.

The fountain was officially accessioned into the IMA's non-art collection in 2003.

== Designer ==
Stuart O. Dawson is a prominent landscape architect and urban designer with Sasaki Associates, formerly Sasaki, Dawson, DeMay Associates, Inc. He has contributed to numerous local and international design projects and has won multiple awards for his work.

== Condition ==
Because of the soft nature of limestone, the fountain eventually had to be renovated to replace the existing blocks which by 1998 had worn away to the point of being at risk of sliding. A limestone-colored type of granite from China was chosen as the replacement material, being a much more durable stone. Granite is also much heavier than limestone, so the foundation was recast to withstand the additional pressure. The rim of worn limestone which edged the platform was removed. With these improvements, the lifespan of the fountain was expected to gain several decades. A rededication took place following the renovation in December 1998.

== See also ==
- List of outdoor artworks at Newfields
- Save Outdoor Sculpture!
