= Snowplow (di Suvero) =

Abstract outdoor sculpture by Mark di Suvero

- Artist: Mark di Suvero
- Year: 1968
- Type: Steel, rubber tire
- Dimensions: 3.7 m × 3.4 m × 2.1 m (12 ft × 11 ft × 7 ft)
- Location: Indianapolis Museum of Art, Indianapolis, United States; 39°49′30.03″N 86°10′57.71″W
- Owner: Indianapolis Museum of Art

Snowplow is an abstract outdoor sculpture by American artist Mark di Suvero located on the grounds of the Indianapolis Museum of Art. The sculpture was purchased in 1975 by the Indianapolis Sesquicentennial Commission and first installed in Indianapolis, Indiana in 1977.

== Description ==
The sculpture is composed of a re-used, painted steel plow blade; a large rubber tire; and an unpainted, industrial steel I-beam base which connects the separate elements. The I-beams, a recurring element of di Suvero's work, are cut and welded into a series of low-lying crossed bars with vertical projections in place to support each suspended element.

The plow blade is positioned in such a way that the bottom edges run horizontally and the upper edges slope up and away from their crux at an angle nearly 30 degrees above horizontal. The front faces and top edges of the blade are painted safety yellow, evoking the tradition of public works. The back of the blade is painted dark gray. The plow head is suspended from the I-beam frame with a steel chain, giving it freedom to swing gently up and down. The tire is attached to the support structure with steel bolts.

The artwork is supported by a pink-colored concrete pad, which is covered by a wide circle of gravel surrounding the artwork.

== Historical information ==
In the late 1960s and 1970s, di Suvero began working in a truly monumental scale, using I-beams as a consistent aesthetic and structural element in his work, as displayed in Snowplow. He drew upon the dynamism of an urban environment for inspiration, as opposed to many Minimalists of the time whose artwork reflected the alienation of modern cities and machinery. Di Suvero believed art to be an integral part of city life, considering both the artwork's surroundings and the viewer's experience as contributing to the artwork; thus, he created many of his artworks to have parts that could swing or rotate in the wind in order to enhance the interactive aspect.

After successfully celebrating Indianapolis 150th anniversary in 1971, and raising funds through the sale of various items (posters, coffee mugs, cookbooks, medallions, etc.) the Indianapolis Sesquicentennial Commission sought to use its funds to acquire a work to commemorate this Anniversary. Upon the selection of Snowplow, $20,000 of funding was obtained from the National Endowment for the Arts (NEA) Art in Public Places program. In 1975 the artwork was purchased for $42,600. For much of that year the artwork was on loan to the Whitney Museum of American Art, finally arriving in Indianapolis in the fall of 1976.

Di Suvero would have been a very well known artists working in the public sphere at this time, having had a display of 5 of his pieces in spring of 1975 at the Tuileries Garden in Paris. At the same time di Suvero's work was known to be controversial as that same year the Oakland city council voted to remove his work, "Mother Peace" from the plaza in front of the René C. Davidson Courthouse.

=== Location history ===
Snowplow was originally on display at the Illinois Center in Chicago, Illinois, and from there the sculpture was shipped to New York for a major di Suvero exhibition at the Whitney before its delivery to Indianapolis.

Snowplow’s original Indianapolis installation in 1977 was prominently located outside the downtown Convention Center. Although the artistic community appreciated its presence, many local board members and private citizens were dissatisfied with its design, and in 1981 it was moved to a less-busy site west of the pump house at White River State Park downtown. The White River Commission was excited about this location, and it fit the criteria of a location suitable for the NEA Art in Public Places Program. The Indianapolis Museum of Art helped move the sculpture and place it appropriately. "Snowplow" was moved again less than three years later, this time out of downtown to the entrance of Central Equipment Management Division on 30th & Riverside Drive.

The artwork was sold to the Indianapolis Museum of Art in 1993 for $120,000. Then Mayor, Stephen Goldsmith declared that "Nationally, it's a respected piece of art. It just hasn't been very much appreciated here in Indianapolis." Funds from the sale of the artwork were set aside in a public art fund to be used to create other artworks in the city.

Once the artwork had arrived at the museum it was installed next to the main entrance driveway from 38th Street that led up towards the Sutphin Fountain.

After the renovations of the IMA in 2005, Snowplow was put on display on the south eastern edge of the grounds.

=== Acquisition ===
When Snowplow first arrived in Indianapolis in 1976, the IMA was bestowed with the unofficial responsibility of maintenance of the artwork. Its purchase by the IMA and entrance into the museum's collection took place in 1993, after which it was moved to the museum property. The resources for the acquisition were provided by the Dan and Lori Efroymson Fund. As terms of the purchase agreement, the city of Indianapolis agreed to use proceeds from the sale to establish a permanent endowment for commissioning artworks for neighborhoods and other public spaces.

== Condition ==
This sculpture was surveyed in 1993 by the Smithsonian's Save Outdoor Sculpture! program.

Between 2001 and 2003 an additional survey was conducted by Save Outdoor Sculpture! to determine the fates of sculptures funded by the NEA Art in Public Places project, which ended in 1992. 91% of funded artworks were able to be surveyed, including Snowplow, totaling approximately 460 pieces. Among these, Snowplow was counted as one of the better-off. According to the survey, eleven percent of the artworks had been destroyed, nearly half were in need of conservation, and one-third were considered well-maintained.
