= Oldfields =

Historic estate in Indianapolis, Indiana, U.S.

- Oldfields (Josiah Kirby Lilly Jr. House)
- U.S. National Register of Historic Places
- U.S. National Historic Landmark District
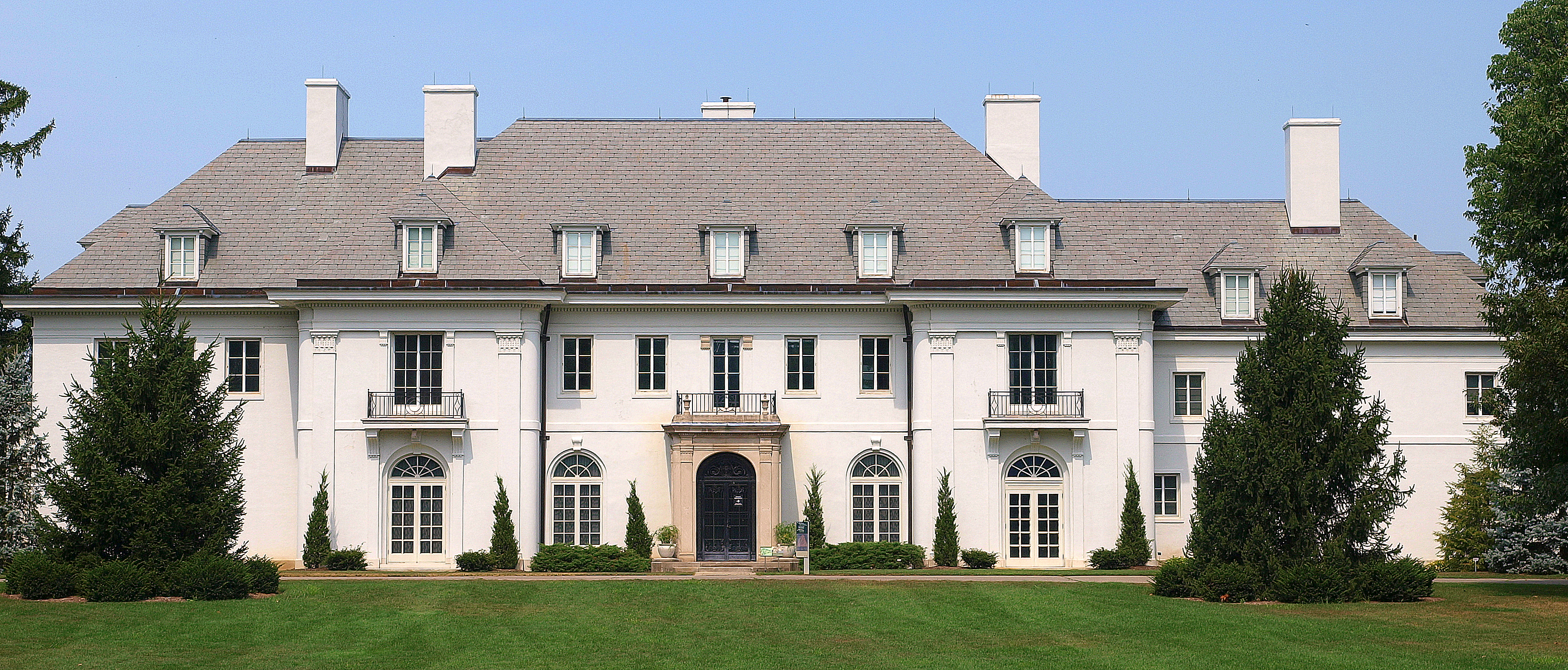
- Oldfields in 2011

- Location within Indianapolis Location within Indiana Location within the United States
- Location: 1200 W. 38th St., Indianapolis, Indiana, U.S.
- Coordinates: 39.8284°N 86.1855°W
- Area: 32 acres (13 ha)
- Built: 1913
- Architects: Davis, Lewis Ketcham; Olmsted Brothers
- Architectural style: Late 19th and 20th Century Revivals
- NRHP reference No.: 00000676 and 03001041

Significant dates
- Added to NRHP: June 15, 2000 (original); July 31, 2003 (increase)
- Designated NHLD: July 31, 2003

Oldfields, also known as Lilly House and Gardens, is a 26-acre (11 ha) historic estate and house museum at Newfields, the campus of the Indianapolis Museum of Art (IMA), in Indianapolis, Indiana, United States. The estate, an example of the American country house movement of the late nineteenth and early twentieth centuries, was designated a U.S. National Historic Landmark in 2003.

Oldfields was built between 1909 and 1913 by architect Lewis Ketcham Davis for the family of Hugh McKennan Landon, who occupied the home from 1913 until 1932 when it was sold to Josiah K. Lilly Jr. Lilly, the late Indianapolis businessman, collector, and philanthropist, renovated and expanded the estate throughout the 1930s and 1940s, updating interiors as well as adding a number of new buildings to the grounds.

Now known as Lilly House, the 22-room mansion has undergone historic restoration and is now open to the public. The historic house is currently interpreted to reflect the 1930s era when the Lilly family occupied the residence. The rest of the Oldfields estate, which was given to the Art Association of Indianapolis by Lilly's children in 1967, now makes up a major portion of the Newfields campus. In addition to the home's significance as a representation of the American country house movement, Oldfields' gardens and grounds are a rare example of a preserved estate landscape designed by Percival Gallagher of the Olmsted Brothers firm.

== History ==
Oldfields was established as part of the Town of Woodstock, a tract of land purchased and developed by Hugh McKennan Landon and Linnaes C. Boyd around 1910 as a suburban neighborhood north of Indianapolis. The area was adjacent to the 555-acre (225 ha) Crown Hill Cemetery and the White River, and included residential lots, a reservoir, and a country club. Landon reserved 26 acres (11 ha), or about half of the land, for the construction of Oldfields, which was completed around 1913.

In 1932, in the midst of the Great Depression, Josiah K. Lilly Jr. purchased the estate. In spite of the economic times, Lilly undertook a number of renovation and expansion projects on the property, including an extension to the south for a new library, renovation of the stair hall and front entrance, and the addition of a vestibule that aligned the entrance with the allée at the front of the property.

In the 1950s, Lilly redecorated several rooms in keeping with the tastes of the time. Bookshelves were removed and walls repainted in order to make room for an expanding portrait collection. Additionally, muralist Douglas Riseborough was employed to update the stair hall and the loggia with murals depicting the surrounding grounds and gardens. While most of these renovations were changed in subsequent decades, the mural illustrating views of the allée can still be seen in the loggia.

In 1967, following the deaths of Lilly and his wife, the Lilly children, Ruth Lilly and J.K. Lilly III, gave the estate to the Art Association of Indianapolis to serve as the new art museum. Called the "Lilly Pavilion of Decorative Arts", the house served as an exhibit space at the time that the association changed its name to the Indianapolis Museum of Art in 1969. In the years that followed, the exhibits focused more on decorative arts and less on the historic aspects of the home and garden. Beginning in the 1980s and 1990s, planning began to restore Oldfields to its former condition. In 2002 the historic home reopened to the public, and in 2003 it was designated as a national historic landmark. The property is considered a historic district and includes 10 buildings and 28 other contributing resources.

=== Country house movement ===
Oldfields is an exemplary representation of an estate constructed during the Country Place Era, or the American country house movement, which took place from approximately 1885 to 1939. The country house movement was a reaction to the expanding industrialization and urbanization of America following the Civil War. As industrialists and businessmen became wealthier at the turn of the twentieth century, it became increasingly popular to invest in large, country estates located outside of cities. It was a way to return to a simpler life, far from the increasingly crowded, dirty, industrialized city. As more families began to own automobiles it became even more feasible to live in the country while remaining involved in city life.

Country houses during this era were often palatial, with expansive estates and architecturally designed gardens. Many estates were self-sufficient farms as well. While the Biltmore Estate in Asheville, North Carolina is considered to be the first and most grand example of the Country Place Era, estates as small as twenty acres could also be reflective of the movement. Oldfields is one such example.

== Structure ==
Lilly House was designed by Landon's brother-in-law, Lewis Ketcham Davis, in French Châteauesque style. The house is positioned on a bluff overlooking the White River, taking advantage of expansive views to the west.

The house includes a service wing, pavilions on the east and west with access to balconies from the second floor, and a large terrace atop a garage and service area. While occupied by the Landon family, the main floor originally included a music room, library, sunroom, living room, dining room, kitchen, and porch. The second floor was made up of private suites, bedrooms, bathrooms, the servants' suite, and a study. A third-floor ballroom was also present in the Landon home and was used for storage during the Lilly's occupancy. At that time the estate also included a formal garden, greenhouse, tennis court, and several outbuildings.

Following the renovations of J.K. Lilly Jr., components of the main level included a great hall, game room, library, drawing room, loggia, dining room, kitchen, and servants quarters as well as an altered stair hall and entrance.

== Grounds and gardens ==
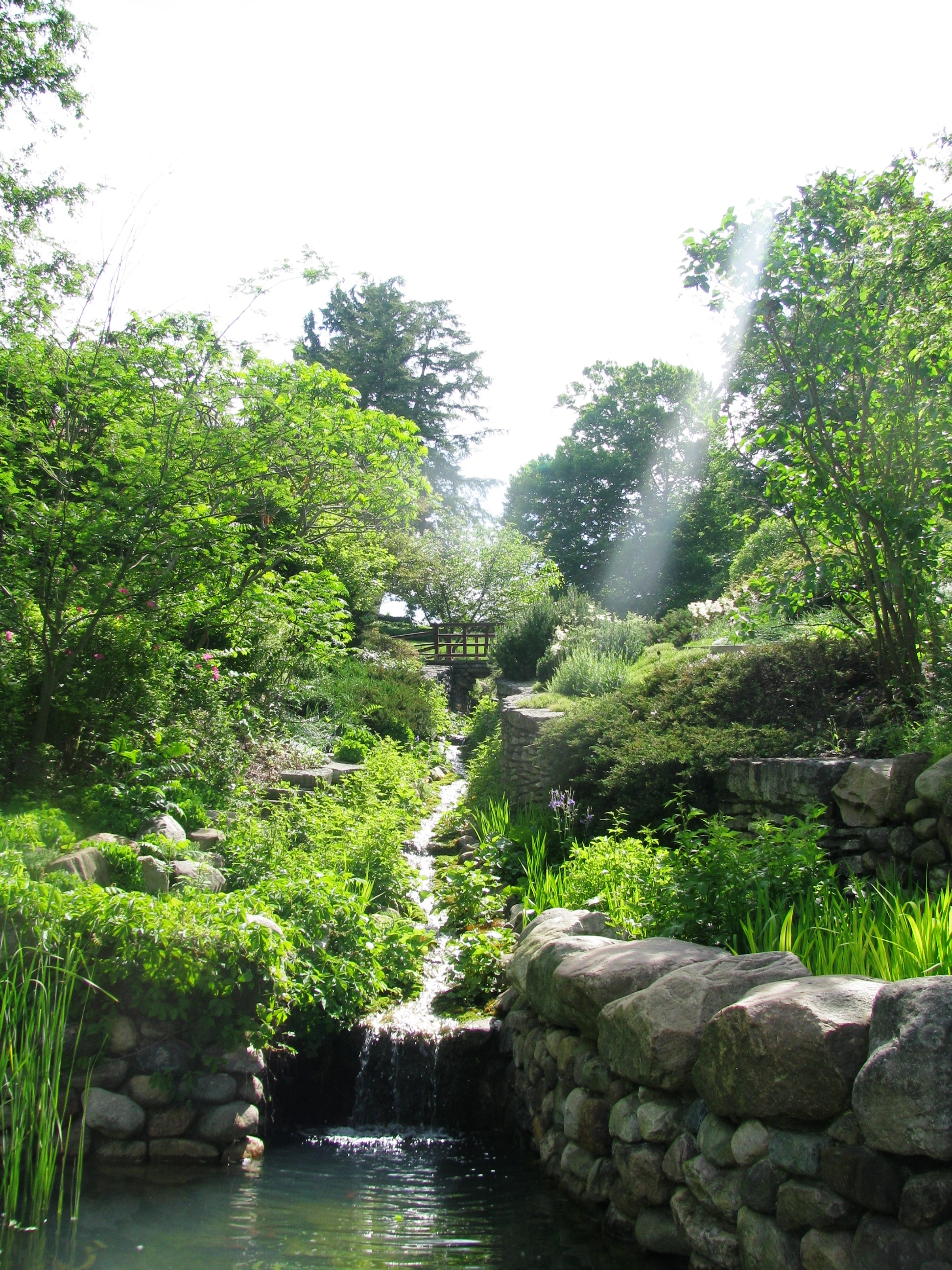
Present-day view from the lower portion of the ravine garden designed by Percival Gallagher.

The first garden on the estate was included as part of the initial design by architect Lewis Ketcham Davis. This formal sunken garden was located to the south of the home and was connected by a series of pathways, flights of steps, and a limestone bridge. The focus of the garden was a circular fountain, surrounded by arbor trellises, two Hermes sculptures, and a shaded bench. The garden has been restored and remains true to its former design.

The landscape remained largely unchanged until Percival Gallagher of the Olmsted Brothers Firm was hired in 1920 by Landon's second wife, Jessie. Gallagher's plans for the property balanced formal components, such as the extravagant allée, and more informal components such as the ravine garden. The ravine garden consists of a watercourse lined with an extensive pattern of rocks, flowers, shrubs, and trees, as well as a meandering path and bridge.

The Grand Allée, or vista, at the front of the property, added an increased sense of formality to the estate, while also serving the more practical function of blocking unwanted sounds and views of Michigan Road. A circular fountain and sculpture of The Three Graces were installed at the end of the allée, positioned in front of a line of evergreens that block the road. Double rows of Dutch elms were planted along each side of the allée, framing the view of the house and drive. Behind the elm trees on both sides of the allée, Gallagher designed border gardens with meandering paths, a multitude of flower beds, and additional sculptures. The border gardens were meant to entice visitors to explore the paths before emerging at the far end of the allée.

When the Lillys purchased the property in 1933 the gardens and grounds were just beginning to mature. The family left the gardens largely unaltered other than the addition of several sculptures throughout. Lilly also constructed a number of new buildings on the grounds, expanding the greenhouse significantly. In 1939, Newfield was constructed as a residence for Joe Lilly and his family. In 1940, a recreation building was built in the south pasture that housed an indoor pool, game room, and exercise room. Outside of the recreation building was an outdoor pool, tennis court, and Four Seasons garden.

An antique wellhead from Europe is located there.

== Today ==
Oldfields is one of three components of Newfields, with Lilly House located adjacent to the main Indianapolis Museum of Art building and the Virginia B. Fairbanks Art & Nature Park. The house features eight furnished historic rooms on the main level, including the stair hall, great hall, game room, library, drawing room, loggia, dining room, and kitchen, the majority of which reflect the 1930s period of the Lilly family's occupancy. Nearly 90 percent of the furnishings and objects are original to the house and were used by the Lilly family. The upper level of Lilly House features historical and interactive exhibits detailing the American Country Place era, Oldfields' development as a country estate, and Indianapolis in the early twentieth century. The second level also includes a sampling of Lilly's collections of books, gold coins, military miniatures, and nautical items. Oldfields' gardens and grounds are preserved and maintained by the museum and are interpreted to reflect the intentions of Percival Gallagher's design.

== See also ==
- Indianapolis Historic Preservation Commission
- List of attractions and events in Indianapolis
- List of botanical gardens and arboretums in Indiana
- List of National Historic Landmarks in Indiana
- List of outdoor artworks at Newfields – Includes some on the grounds of Oldfields
- Miller House (Columbus, Indiana) – another house operated by the Indianapolis Museum of Art
- National Register of Historic Places listings in Marion County, Indiana
