= George Henry Alexander Clowes =

American Physician

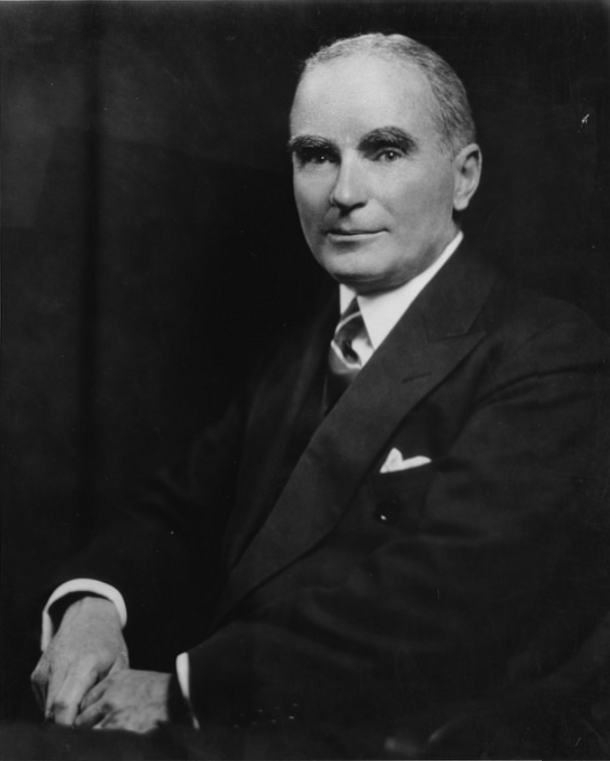
George Henry Alexander Clowes (1877-1958)

George Henry Alexander Clowes (1877–1958) was a chemist who worked as the first research director at Eli Lilly and Company. He was responsible for mobilizing Eli Lilly resources to mass-produce insulin, making it available for diabetics beginning in 1923. He was president of the American Association for Cancer Research in 1938-1939. The AACR Clowes Award for cancer research was named in his honor. He and his two sons established The Clowes Fund in 1952 to fund art, education, and social services.

He was also an art collector whose collection of paintings by European Old Masters was donated to the Indianapolis Museum of Art.

His grandson, Alexander Whitehill Clowes, wrote The Doc and the Duchess, a book about his grandfather's life and legacy.
