= Orly Genger =

American sculptor

Orly Genger (born 1979, New York, NY) is a contemporary American sculptor. She currently lives and works in New York. Genger received a Postbaccalaureate degree from the Art Institute of Chicago in 2002 and graduated from Brown University with a BA in 2001.

== Work ==
Known for her large scale installations, Genger most commonly uses discarded rope to painstakingly hand knot monumental sculpture. She describes the process as physically challenging and an important part of making her work.

Genger's largest installation to date Red, Yellow and Blue was installed in Madison Square Park in New York City in May 2013. Other large scale work has been exhibited at Massachusetts Museum of Contemporary Art and the Indianapolis Museum of Art.

In 2012, Genger began working in casting aluminum and bronze pieces. The works are more intimate in size. The cast sculptures reference both of her large scale rope pieces as well as her very detailed drawings and collages of superhero limbs.

== Collections ==
Genger's work can be found in many private and public collections including MoMA, The Whitney Museum of American Art, Hood Museum of Art, Albright-Knox Art Gallery, Indianapolis Museum of Art, Yale University Art Gallery, Hammer Museum of Contemporary Art and SFMoMA among others.

=== Selected solo exhibitions ===
- Muscle Memory, Tel Aviv, Israel (2025)
- Red, Yellow, and Blue, Madison Square Park, New York, NY (2013)
- Iron Maiden, Larissa Goldston Gallery, New York, NY (2013)
- Big Open Empty, Larissa Goldston Gallery, New York, NY (2011)
- Gavlak, West Palm Beach, FL (2011)
- Move, Larissa Goldston Gallery, New York, NY (2011)
- Whole, Indianapolis Museum of Art, Indianapolis, IN (2008)
- Devin Borden Hiram Butler Gallery, Houston, TX (2008)
- Cornell Fine Arts Museum at Rollins College, Winter Park, FL (2008)
- Posedown, Lemberg Gallery, Ferndale, MI (2007)
- MASSPEAK, Larissa Goldston Gallery, New York, NY (2007)
- The Aldrich Contemporary Art Museum, Ridgefield, CT (2005)
- Locust Projects, Miami, FL (2005)
- Elizabeth Dee Gallery, New York, NY (2004)

=== Selected group exhibitions ===
- Makeup on Empty Space, Larissa Goldston Gallery, New York, NY (2012)
- Sentimental Education, Gavlak Gallery, Palm Beach, FL (2011)
- Energy Effects: Art and Artifacts from the Landscape of Glorious Excess, MCA Denver, Denver, CO (2010)
- MATERIAL WORLD: Sculpture to Environment, Massachusetts Museum of Contemporary Art, North Adams, MA (2010)
- Brucennial, New York, NY (2010)
- The Fields Sculpture Park at Omi International Arts Center, Ghent, NY (2009)
- Dritto Rovescio, Triennale di Milano, Milan, Italy (2009)
- Collector's Choice III Audacity in Art, Orlando Museum of Art, Orlando, FL (2007)
- Queens International 2006, Queens Museum of Art, Queens, New York, NY (2006)
- Studio in The Park, New York, NY. Curated by Karin Bravin (2006)
- EAF04: 2004 Emerging Artist Fellowship Exhibition, Socrates Sculpture Park, Long Island City, New York (2004)
- Haifa Second International Installation Triennale, Haifa Museum of Art, Haifa, Israel (2003)
- The Reconstruction Biennial, Exit Art, New York, NY (2003)
