= Aristotle (Ribera) =

1637 painting by Jusepe de Ribera

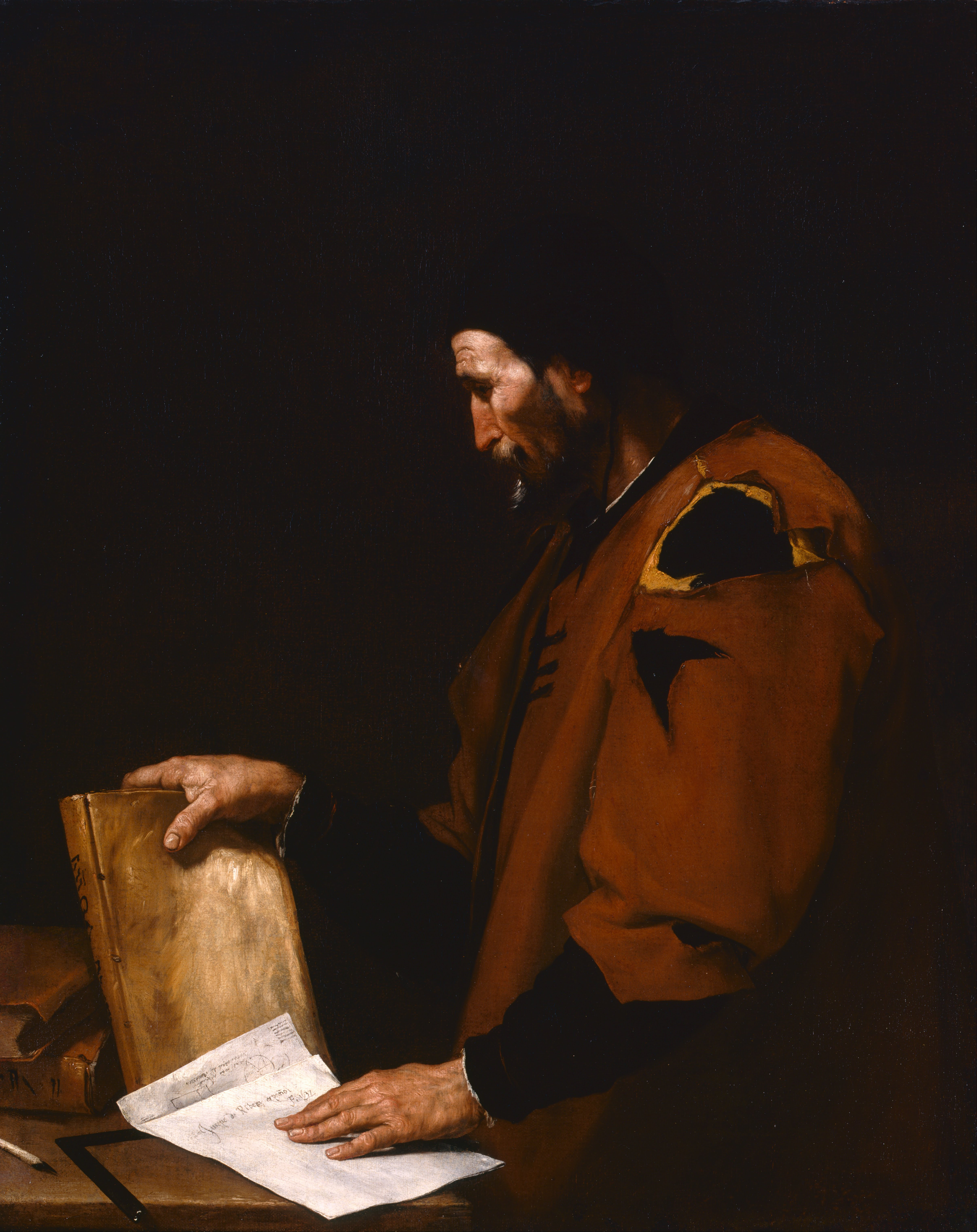
- Artist: Jusepe de Ribera
- Year: 1637
- Type: Oil painting on canvas
- Dimensions: 120 cm × 99 cm (49 in × 39 in)
- Location: Indianapolis Museum of Art, Indianapolis

Aristotle is a 1637 oil painting by Spanish artist Jusepe de Ribera, located in the Indianapolis Museum of Art, which is in Indianapolis, Indiana. It is part of a series of six portraits of ancient philosophers commissioned by the Prince of Liechtenstein in 1636.

== Description ==
Aristotle is here portrayed as a beggar-philosopher, a popular conceit in the seventeenth century. His asceticism is well in keeping with Spanish Catholicism, and is a hallmark of the saints Ribera also painted. He is surrounded by light reminiscent of Caravaggio, with whom Ribera is often associated. That, and his direct, naturalistic style (also courtesy of Caravaggio) make this a powerful image of a philosopher and his profound contemplations. Aristotle is painted in a very tactile manner, with deep creases in his worn face and hands. Ribera proudly signed the painting across the papers in Aristotle's hand, appending "español" to his name to assert his nationality.

== Historical information ==
When Karl Eusebius, Prince of Liechtenstein originally commissioned this series in May 1636, the request was for a full dozen paintings. However, only the first six were ever delivered. These were listed in a 1767 inventory as Aristotle, Plato, Crates, Anaxagoras, Protagoras, and Diogenes. The set was sold and scattered in 1957, although briefly reunited by the Metropolitan Museum of Art in 1992 for a Ribera exhibition.

The identification of this particular image has been somewhat problematic over the years. Although the 1767 inventory was clear enough, only Diogenes, Anaxagoras, and Crates are identified by inscriptions on the paintings. The current consensus is that the doctor's robe and scholar's skullcap mean this image must be Aristotle. However, for years, the IMA identified the subject as Archimedes due to the geometric drawings in his hand, although that particular philosopher was not mentioned in the inventory.

=== Location history ===
From 1637 until 1957, the Princes of Lichtenstein retained possession of the painting. Then it was purchased by Dr. G.H.A. Clowes, who generously lent it to the IMA. The IMA officially acquired Aristotle in 2000, courtesy of the Clowes family, and gave it the accession number 2000.345. It hangs in the Clowes Pavilion with many other donations from that family.

== See also ==
- Caravaggisti
