= Belinda Tate =

American art museum administrator

- Education: Yale University, Wake Forest University, and Yale Graduate School
- Occupation: Museum administrator of Indianapolis Museum of Art

Belinda Tate is an American art museum administrator who previously served as the director of the Indianapolis Museum of Art, having started the role on November 6, 2023.

== Early life and education ==
Tate is a native of Winston-Salem, North Carolina. She attended Yale University, receiving a bachelor's degree in art history, with a focus on museum studies. She received a master's degree in liberal studies from Wake Forest University. She has also studied at Yale Graduate School for art conservation and connoisseurship, and British art and architecture at the Paul Mellon Center for British Art.

== Career ==
In 1999, Tate was appointed the director of the Diggs Gallery, a major African-American art gallery at Winston-Salem State University. Tate served in the position for 15 years, making increases to the gallery's permanent collection and increasing its use among the student population.

In 2014, Tate was named the new executive director of Kalamazoo Institute of Arts, starting on September 8. Her appointment made her the institution's first Black director.

In 2023, Tate was named the director of the Indianapolis Museum of Art. https://www.artforum.com/news/belinda-tate-executive-director-of-ima-newfields-leaving-1234761138/
