= Indianapolis Museum of Art =

Art museum in Indianapolis, Indiana, US

Indianapolis Museum of Art at Newfields

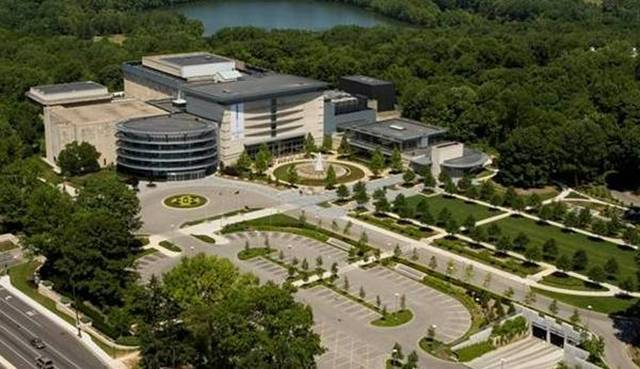
- An overhead view of the Newfields campus, located in Indianapolis, Indiana, United States.
- Established: 1883; 143 years ago
- Location: 4000 Michigan Road, Indianapolis, Indiana, U.S.
- Coordinates: 39°49′33″N 86°11′08″W
- Type: Art museum
- Collection size: 54,000
- Visitors: 442,500 (2019)
- Director: Belinda Tate
- President: Le Monte Booker
- Public transit access: 34, 38; Indiana Pacers Bikeshare
- Website: discovernewfields.org

The Indianapolis Museum of Art (IMA) is an encyclopedic art museum located at Newfields, a 152-acre (62 ha) campus that also houses Lilly House, The Virginia B. Fairbanks Art & Nature Park, the Garden at Newfields and more. It is located at the corner of North Michigan Road and West 38th Street, about three miles north of downtown Indianapolis, Indiana, United States. There are exhibitions, classes, tours, and events, many of which change seasonally. The entire campus and organization was previously referred to as the Indianapolis Museum of Art. In 2017 the campus and organization were renamed "Newfields" as part of a rebranding campaign while the "Indianapolis Museum of Art" now specifically refers to the main art museum building that acts as the cornerstone of the campus, as well as the legal name of the organization doing business as Newfields.

The Indianapolis Museum of Art is the ninth oldest (Note: The nine oldest museums in the US are Peabody Essex Museum, 1799; Wadsworth Atheneum, 1842; Metropolitan Museum of Art, 1870; Museum of Fine Arts, Boston, 1870; Philadelphia Museum of Art, 1876; Columbus Museum of Art, Ohio, 1878; Art Institute of Chicago, 1879; Cincinnati Art Museum, 1881; Portland Museum of Art, 1882; and Indianapolis Museum of Art, 1883.) and eighth largest encyclopedic art museum in the United States. (Note: At 669,484 square feet (62,197.1 m^{2}), the IMA is eighth largest in the United States in Main Museum Building space among the 130 respondents in the Association of Art Museum Directors 2010 Statistical Survey.) The permanent collection comprises over 54,000 works, including African, American, Asian, and European pieces. Significant areas of the collection include: Neo-Impressionist paintings; Japanese paintings of the Edo period; Chinese ceramics and bronzes; paintings, sculptures, and prints by Paul Gauguin and the Pont-Aven School; a large number of works by J. M. W. Turner; and a contemporary art and design collection. Other areas of emphasis include textiles and fashion arts as well as a focus on modern design.

Founded in 1883 as the Art Association of Indianapolis, the first permanent museum was opened in 1906 as part of the John Herron Art Institute. In 1969, the Art Association of Indianapolis changed its name to the Indianapolis Museum of Art, and in 1970 the museum moved to its current location. Among the Art Association's founders was May Wright Sewall (1844–1920), known for her work in the women's suffrage movement. Other supporters have included Booth Tarkington (1869–1946), Eli Lilly (1885–1977), Herman C. Krannert (1887–1972), and Caroline Marmon Fesler (1878–1960). The associated John Herron Art Institute was established with the help of notable Hoosier Group artists T. C. Steele and William Forsyth.

The museum is widely recognized as innovative in its development of open source technologies, institutional transparency, and collaboration between museums. In 2008, the IMA became the first fine art museum to be named an Energy Star partner due to its greening initiative and efforts to reduce energy consumption. In 2009, the IMA was awarded the National Medal for Museum and Library Service for public service, specifically the museum's free admission policy and educational programming. The free admission policy began in 1941 and remained in place until 2007, when an admission fee for non-members was instated. Free admission returned a year later and remained until 2014, when a fee was reinstated for non-members.

== History ==
=== Early days (1883–1969) ===
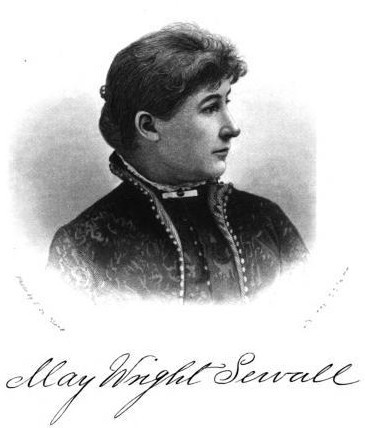
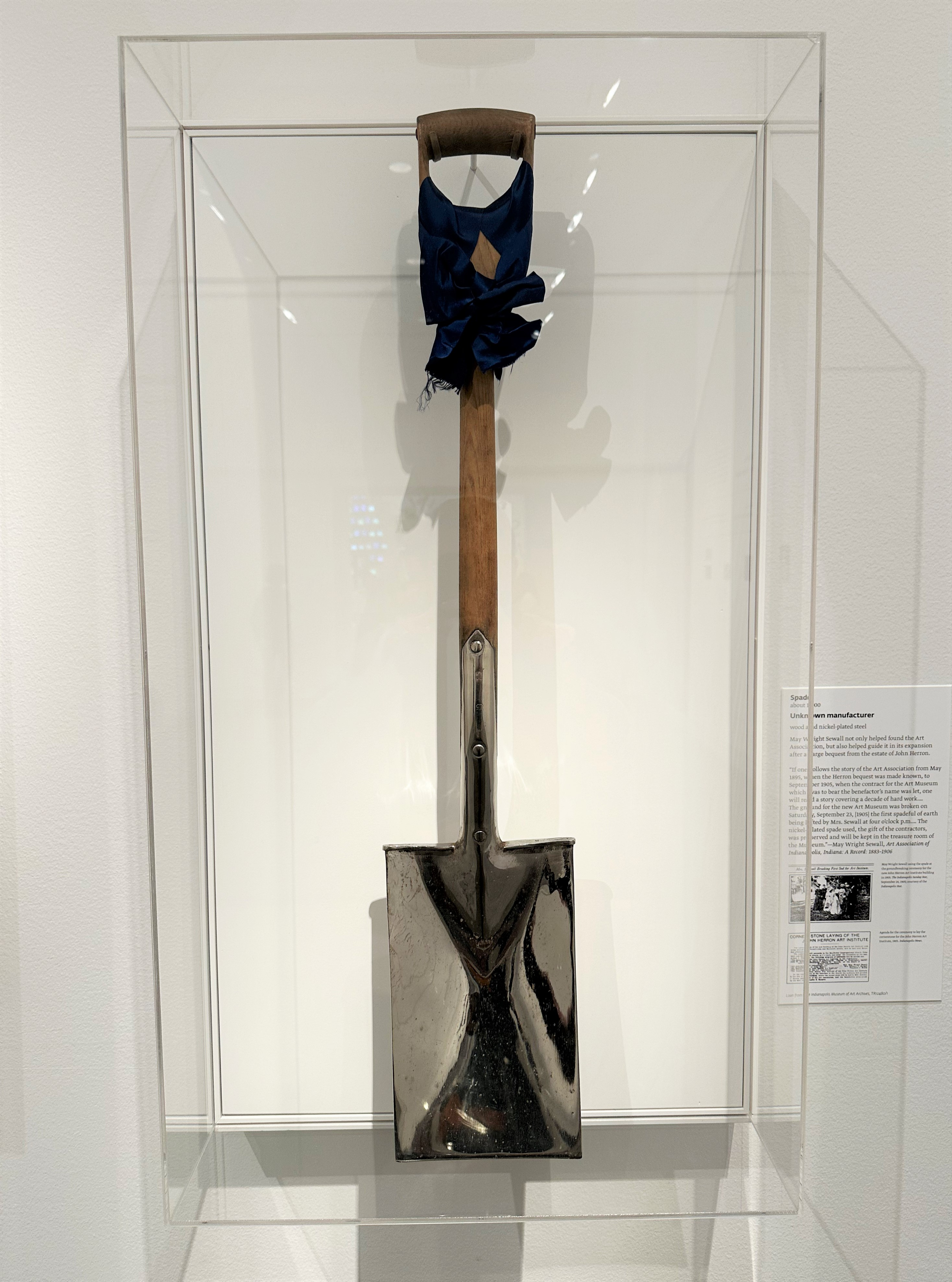
Suffragist May Wright Sewall helped found the Art Association in 1883. In 1905, she used this spade to break ground on the John Herron Art Institute's Museum of Art.

The Indianapolis Museum of Art was founded as the Art Association of Indianapolis, an open-membership group led by suffragist May Wright Sewall. Formed in 1883, the organization aimed to inform the public about visual art and provide art education. The Art Association's first exhibition, which opened November 7, 1883, contained 453 artworks from 137 artists. The death of wealthy Indianapolis resident John Herron in 1895 left a substantial bequest with the stipulation that the money be used for a gallery and a school with his name. The John Herron Art Institute opened in 1902 at the corner of 16th and Pennsylvania street, with the Herron Art School and the Herron Museum of Art opening in 1906. Emphasis on the Arts and Crafts movement grew throughout the early years of the school, with a focus on applied art. William Henry Fox was hired in 1905 as the Herron Museum of Art's first director. From 1905 to 1910, Fox managed both the museum and the school while constructing two new buildings on the 16th Street site.

From the 1930s until the 1950s, the John Herron Art Institute placed an emphasis on professionalism and growth in collections. Wilbur Peat, director of the museum from 1929 until 1965, acquired significant portions of the collection. Peat also made connections with benefactors such as George H. A. Clowes, Booth Tarkington, and Eli Lilly. Caroline Marmon Fesler, president of the Art Association of Indianapolis, gave a number of artworks in the 1940s, including 20th-century modern artworks and Post-Impressionist works by Cézanne, Van Gogh, and Seurat. After years of debate surrounding expansion and relocation of the museum and school, the great-grandchildren of Eli Lilly, J.K. Lilly III and Ruth Lilly, donated the family estate, Oldfields, to the Art Association of Indianapolis in 1966. One year later the Art Association decided that the Herron Art School would be ceded to Indiana University's Indianapolis campus in an effort to assist with accreditation. That same year the Association confirmed that the museum would relocate to Oldfields, with the new Krannert Pavilion opening to the public in October 1970. In 1969, prior to moving to the new site, the Art Association of Indianapolis officially changed its name to the Indianapolis Museum of Art.

=== Move to current location (1970–2011) ===
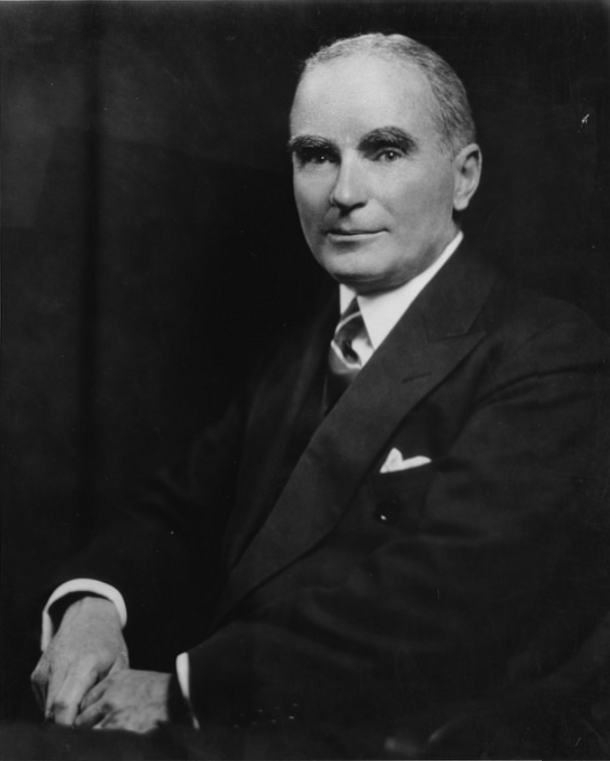
George Henry Alexander Clowes, who, alongside his wife Edith, donated their art collection to the IMA.

In 1960, Art Association of Indianapolis board members began discussing the idea of placing the museum at the center of a new cultural campus. Inspired by University Circle in Cleveland, Ohio, board chairman Herman Krannert proposed building an "Acropolitan Area" that would combine a number of cultural institutions in a natural setting. The museum's location on the grounds of Oldfields allowed architect Ambrose Madison Richardson to build on the idea of an acropolis while also utilizing the natural features of the site. Krannert Pavilion opened in 1970 as the first of four buildings located on the museum's grounds. Following the opening of Krannert, the expansion continued with the Clowes Pavilion in 1972, which housed the Clowes' collection of Old Masters. Construction on the Showalter Pavilion and Sutphin Fountain was completed in 1973. In 1986, the IMA's board members chose Edward Larrabee Barnes to design the Hulman Pavilion, a new wing of the museum which housed the Eiteljorg collection of African and South Pacific art. The pavilion opened in 1990 and increased the exhibition space to more than 80,000 square feet (7,400 m^{2}). The expansion aimed to provide clearer chronological continuity and a more coherent flow as visitors moved from one gallery to the next.

Bret Waller became the director of the IMA in 1990, and was succeeded by Anthony Hirschel in 2001. From the mid-1990s until 2005 the IMA focused on the next phase of development, the "New Vision", or what became known as the "New IMA". After four years of restoration, the Oldfields mansion reopened to the public in June 2002 and was designated a National Historic Landmark in 2003.

Lawrence A. O'Connor Jr., a former CEO of Bank One Indiana, was named the interim director of the IMA in November 2004 when the previous director Hirschel unexpectedly resigned. In 2005 the museum completed a three-year, $74 million renovation and expansion project that added three new wings and 50 percent more gallery space to the building. In all, the construction added 164,000 square feet (15,200 m^{2}) to the museum, in addition to the renovation of 90,000 square feet (8,400 m^{2}) of existing space. Renovations included the Hulman and Clowes Pavilions, which house the museum's European collection, as well as the addition of the Allen Whitehill Clowes Gallery. The expansion aimed to unify the building and campus while creating a more welcoming atmosphere for visitors. As one of three new wings and as a new entry to the building, the Efroymson Pavilion helped to transition visitors between the museum and the surrounding grounds. The Wood Gallery Pavilion added three levels of gallery space as well as a dining area and education suite, while the Deer Special Events Pavilion added additional space for private and public events. The architectural focus on welcoming visitors coincided with a new advertising campaign that reached out to a broader, more diverse audience.

Maxwell L. Anderson was hired as the permanent director and CEO of the IMA in 2006. While director, Anderson oversaw the opening of the Virginia B. Fairbanks Art & Nature Park: 100 Acres and a conservation science-focused laboratory, as well as the acquisition of the mid-century modern Miller House and Garden estate. In 2008, the museum changed its main entrance and address from 1200 West 38th Street to 4000 North Michigan Road. Anderson left the museum in 2011.

=== Time under Charles L. Venable (2012–2021) ===
Charles L. Venable was hired as the director and CEO of the IMA in October 2012. The Indianapolis Star stated that while the previous six years under Anderson had seen impressive and well-received art world achievements, such as the acquisition of the Miller House and securing the bid for the Venice Biennale, liberal spending had led to a decrease in the endowment and the alienation of some big donors. The IMA was struggling with finances at the time, at least in part due to the Great Recession, as well as the departure of two fundraising chiefs from the museum and a top donor from the board of governors. A few months before Venable's arrival, the Moody's credit rating agency changed the IMA's rating from "stable" to "negative", due to the IMA's outstanding debt and reliance on investment income. From the beginning, Venable's financial conservatism and increase in paid events characterized as populist were a major part of his directorship, a direction that was alternately praised and lambasted by art critics, the local art community, and the media. In February 2013, art journalist Tyler Green criticized the approach, stating, "a mission-driven art museum is not a theme park [and] mere attendance is not a meaningful end." However, Venable defended the approach as pragmatic, stating, "Arts audiences over the last 50 years are getting smaller, so you've got to appeal to more people."

In March 2013, the IMA cut eleven percent of its staff in order to save $1.7 million annually. Following these layoffs, several high-profile staff members left, including curators of contemporary art Lisa Freiman and Sarah Urist Green. In April 2015, IMA leadership ended the organization's policy of free admission to all visitors, a move which was largely criticized by the media and patrons, but that the museum maintained was needed for financial stability. This change came with the addition of free parking. Subsequently, paid membership rose from about 5,000 when the museum was free, to more than 17,000 in October 2017.

In mid-2016 and 2017, the IMA offered outdoor minigolf. The program was created by Scott Stulen, the curator of audience experiences at the time. The holes were designed by a variety of artists to have a Hoosier theme. The intent of the project was to use the museum's outdoor space to display interactive art that might attract those who might not usually feel comfortable in an art museum.

In October 2017, the museum continued this movement towards appealing to a wider audience with the announcement of a new branding initiative in which both the campus and the organization itself was renamed "Newfields". The initiative formally changed the names of the IMA, The Gardens, The Virginia B. Fairbanks Art & Nature Park, and Lilly House to include the phrase "at Newfields" appended to the end of each. The rebranding was preceded by the exodus of several curators, including the curator of contemporary art Tricia Paik and Scott Stulen. The effort included a number of new outdoor events including Winterlights, starting in 2017, and Harvest, starting in 2019.

In early 2018, the organization's new direction was heavily criticized by art critic Kriston Capps writing for CityLab, stating the changes were, "the greatest travesty in the art world in 2017" and that, "Venable [had] turned a grand encyclopedic museum into a cheap Midwestern boardwalk." The criticisms were widely discussed in the art community and Indianapolis media.

Around 2018, the museum spent $5.6 million per year to store and maintain the art, and with the museum's growing collection, its storage space needed to double at what would have been a cost of $12 million. However, in 2019, Venable sought to improve the quality of the IMA's art collection and reduce the amount of money the museum spent on art storage. A seven-year review of all 55,000 art objects in the collection began, asking curators to rank them in terms of quality from a high “A” to low “D”. This exercise allowed the institution to identify and promote its masterpieces, while slating lower quality pieces for deaccessioning in accordance with national museum standards. Venable's thoughts on the unsustainability of rapid collection growth and building expansions to accommodate more and more art brought him national attention, but proved controversial to some, including the IMA's staff.

The museum was temporarily closed from March 17, 2020, to June 23, 2020, in response to the COVID-19 pandemic in Indiana. After reopening, only the outdoor areas were accessible until July 18, when the galleries and other indoor facilities reopened.

In 2021, the institution opened a remodeled fourth floor with 30,000 sq. ft. of digital art exhibitions called the Lume. The exhibit, considered a pet project of Venable, replaced the contemporary art exhibit at the museum, which provoked further controversy. The first exhibit was a Van Gogh immersive experience.

=== Job posting controversy and continued turmoil (2021-present) ===
In February 2021, the organization and Venable received national attention regarding a job posting for a new director. The Board of Trustees had elevated Venable to the new position of President of Newfields as part of a transition strategy that included Venable's planned retirement and the appointment of a new art museum director. In consultation with the San Francisco-based executive search firm m/Oppenheim Associates, a job description was created that stressed the desire for Newfields to diversify its audience over time without losing supporters who made up its current "core, white art audience".

The phrase attracted significant criticism from the press and art community, and sparked a larger discussion of what was described by some former employees as a "toxic" and "discriminatory" culture at Newfields. Ganggang, an Indianapolis-based cultural development firm, had been planning an exhibition with the museum featuring the 18 Black artists behind the city's Black Lives Matter street mural, known as The Eighteen Art Collective. The nonprofit announced they would not go forward with the exhibition. Open letters calling for Venable's removal were created by 85 Newfields employees and members of the board of governors, as well as another from more than 1,900 artists, local arts leaders and former employees of the museum. Venable resigned from his position as president of Newfields on February 17, 2021, and the company released a statement announcing chief financial officer Jerry Wise would serve as interim president and committing to a series of changes.

In November 2021, Newfields announced plans to revamp their galleries, with "global thematic displays" that reorganize works by theme, rather than time period or artistic movement.

In December 2021, Darrianne Christian was voted the first Black chairwoman on the museum's board. Colette Pierce Burnette was announced as the new president in May 2022, and she began leading the museum in August of that year. Burnette was previously the university president of the private historically Black Huston–Tillotson University and was the first Black woman to lead the museum.

In September 2022, a reworked version of The Eighteen Art Collective's art exhibition began, titled "We. The Culture". The works covered themes of hip-hop culture, queer identity and social justice.

In September 2023, after the position had remained empty since Venable's ascension to President of Newfields two-and-a-half years prior, Newfields announced the hiring of Belinda Tate as the new Director of the Indianapolis Museum of Art at Newfields, with Tate slated to start in November 2023.

In October 2023, the Indiana State Fair announced Newfields would be the presenting sponsor for the 2024 edition of the fair, with the selection of "the art and nature of fun" as the fair's theme.

The same month Tate began her role, the museum announced Burnette was leaving her role as President and CEO after only fifteen months on the job. Michael Kubacki, a former member of the board of trustees, was named as the interim head of the museum. No explanation was given for Burnette's departure. The Indiana Black Expo and Indianapolis Urban League paused their partnerships with Newfields and released a joint statement reading, "Due to the nature of the announcement and the negative perception it has created, the Newfields board leadership owes the community an explanation about the resignation of Dr. Colette Burnette." Additionally, three board members resigned leading up to and immediately following Burnette's departure. One of the members, Gary Hirschberg, stated his resignation was due to an "imposed direction", while another, chief human resources officer at IU Health Adrienne Sims, stated that, "Recent leadership decisions were not made in an inclusive and consultative manner". Several protestors picketed the first day of Newfields' annual Winterlights festival, as many Black community groups demanded an explanation for the departure. Kubacki served as interim president until October 2024, when Le Monte G. Booker took over. Booker previously served as chief financial officer at the Field Museum in Chicago.

== Newfields components ==
=== Indianapolis Museum of Art (IMA) ===
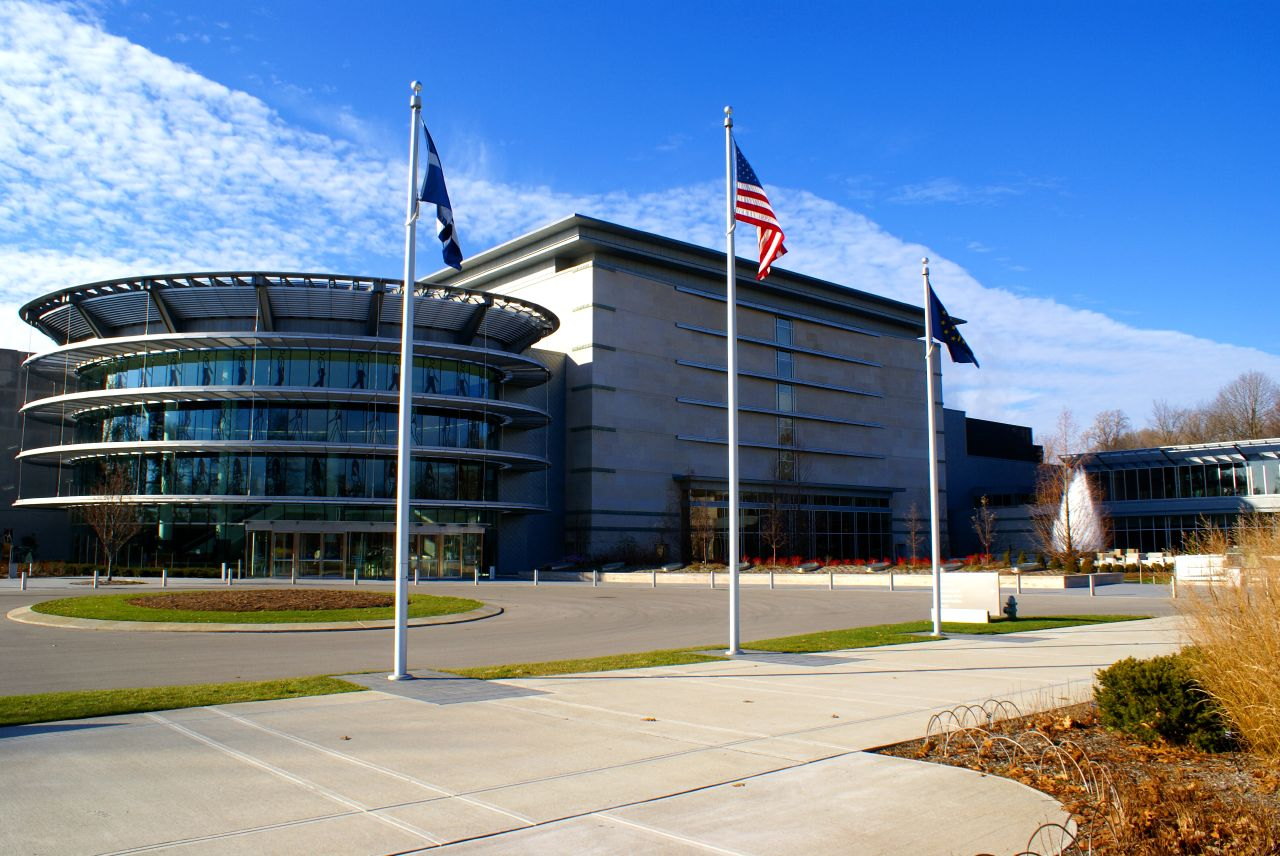
Front entrance of the museum and Sutphin Fountain in 2006

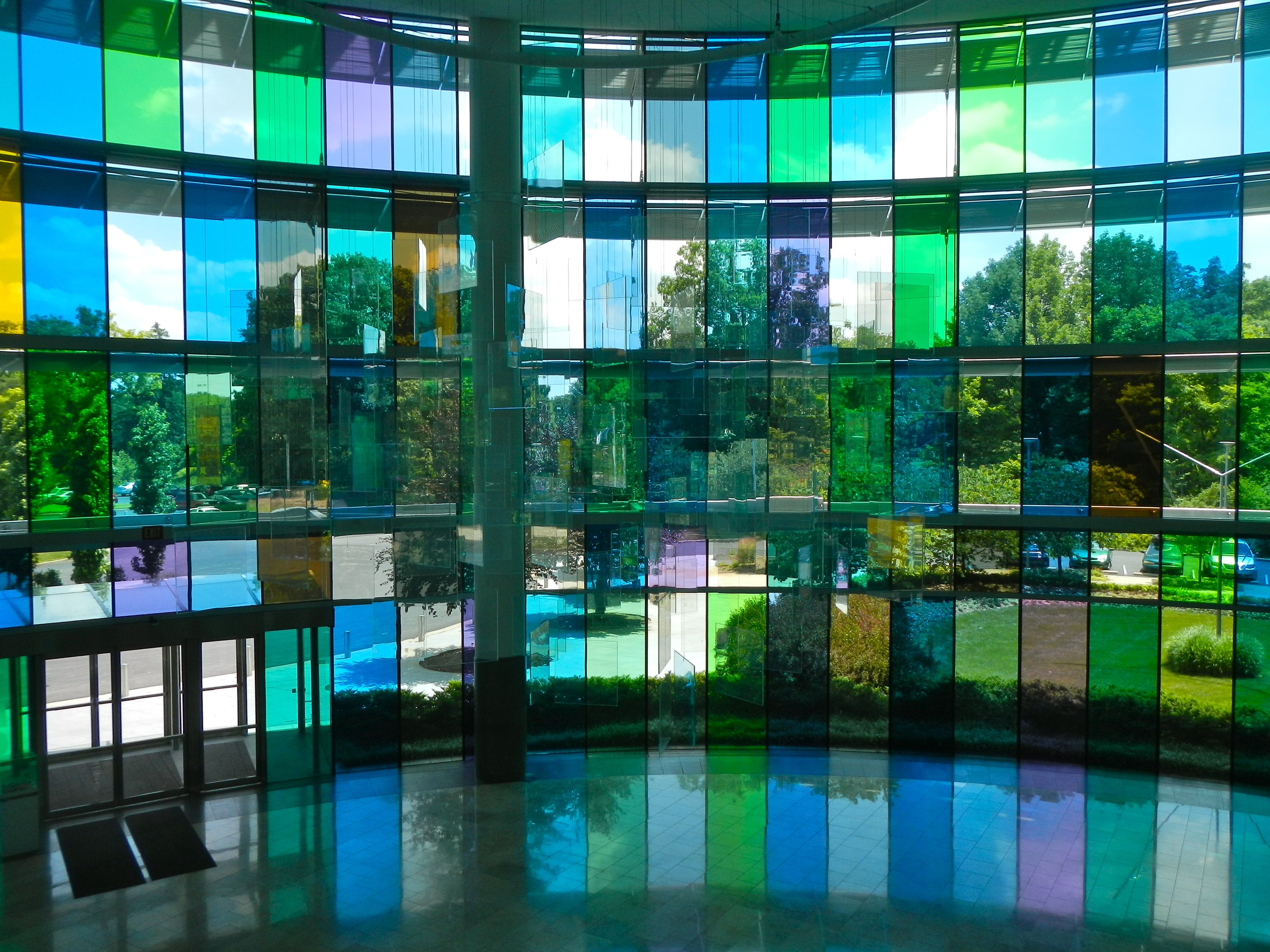
View from inside the front lobby of the museum in 2013 with Following Nature by Spencer Finch installed

The IMA is the building that acts as the cornerstone of Newfields. The museum is the ninth oldest (Note: The nine oldest museums in the US are Peabody Essex Museum, 1799; Wadsworth Atheneum, 1842; Metropolitan Museum of Art, 1870; Museum of Fine Arts, Boston, 1870; Philadelphia Museum of Art, 1876; Columbus Museum of Art, Ohio, 1878; Art Institute of Chicago, 1879; Cincinnati Art Museum, 1881; Portland Museum of Art, 1882; and Indianapolis Museum of Art, 1883.) and eighth largest encyclopedic art museum in the United States. (Note: At 669,484 square feet (62,197.1 m^{2}), the IMA is eighth largest in the United States in Main Museum Building space among the 130 respondents in the Association of Art Museum Directors 2010 Statistical Survey.) In addition to housing the museum's extensive collection, the building contains the ticket office, main entrance to the Newfields campus, the museum and garden gift shop, and the basement café. In recent years, the museum has supplemented its food offerings with pop-up restaurants, such as a noodle shop in June 2019. The museum also offers event and performance spaces in the DeBoest Lecture Hall, Pulliam Family Great Hall, the Randolph H. Deer Special Events Pavilion, the Tobias Theater (known as "The Toby"), and the outdoor Amphitheater.

==== The Lume ====
Formerly the museum's contemporary art exhibition, the IMA's fourth floor is dedicated to the Lume, stylized THE LUME Indianapolis, a 30,000 square feet (2,800 m^{2}) area that displays digital projections of art. When it opened in July 2021, the Lume displayed images inspired by Vincent van Gogh, which remained until May 2022. It was announced at that time that the exhibit would feature displays inspired by Claude Monet and other Impressionists starting in July 2022 and running until May 2023. Access to the Lume is an additional fee on top of admission, with a reduced price for members.

==== Pulliam Family Great Hall ====
Art in the Pullman Family Great Hall of the IMA

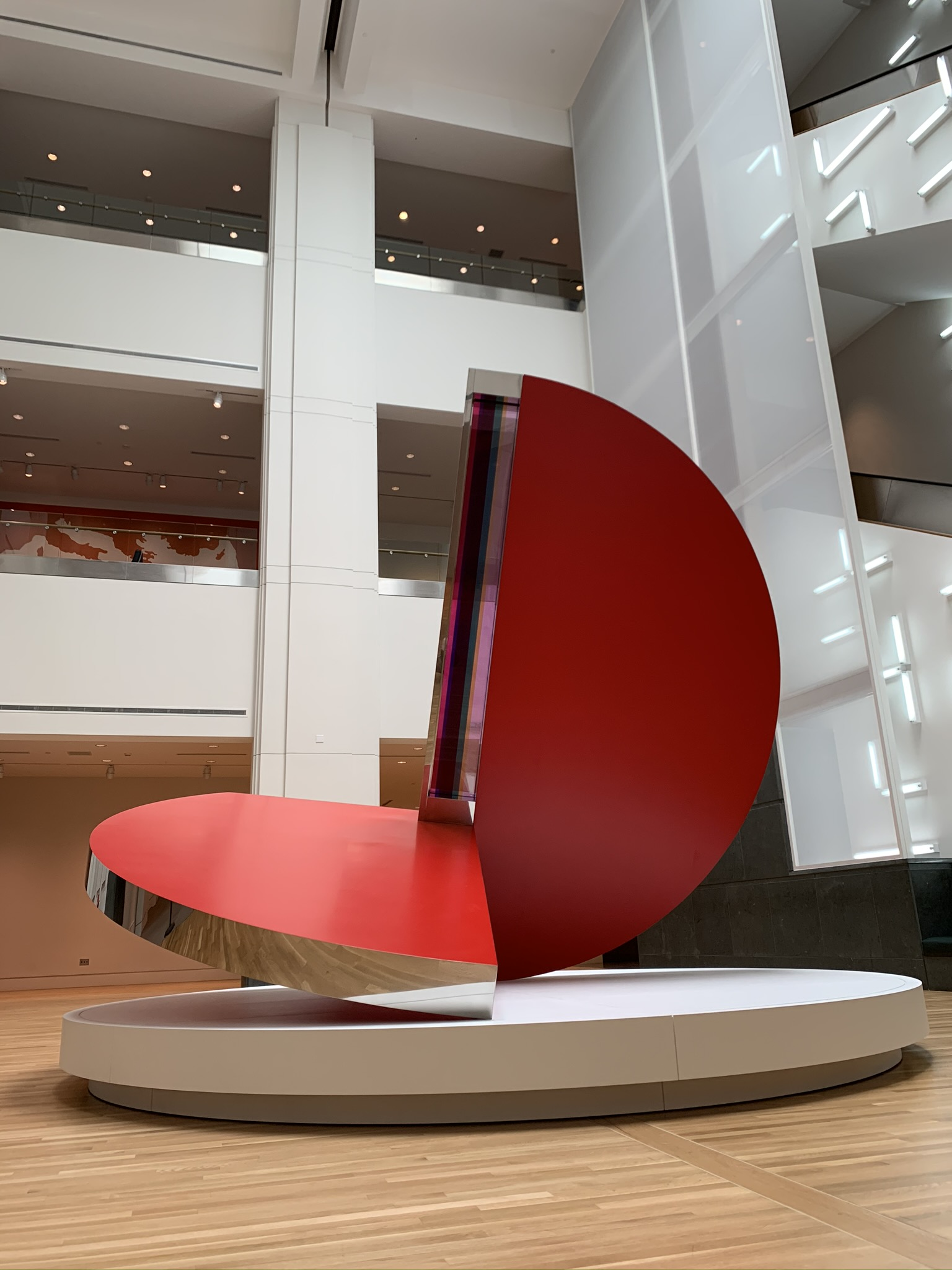
Folded Circle Dynamics Red Phase III (1976) by Fletcher Benton in the foreground and part of Light and Space III (2008) by Robert Irwin in the background

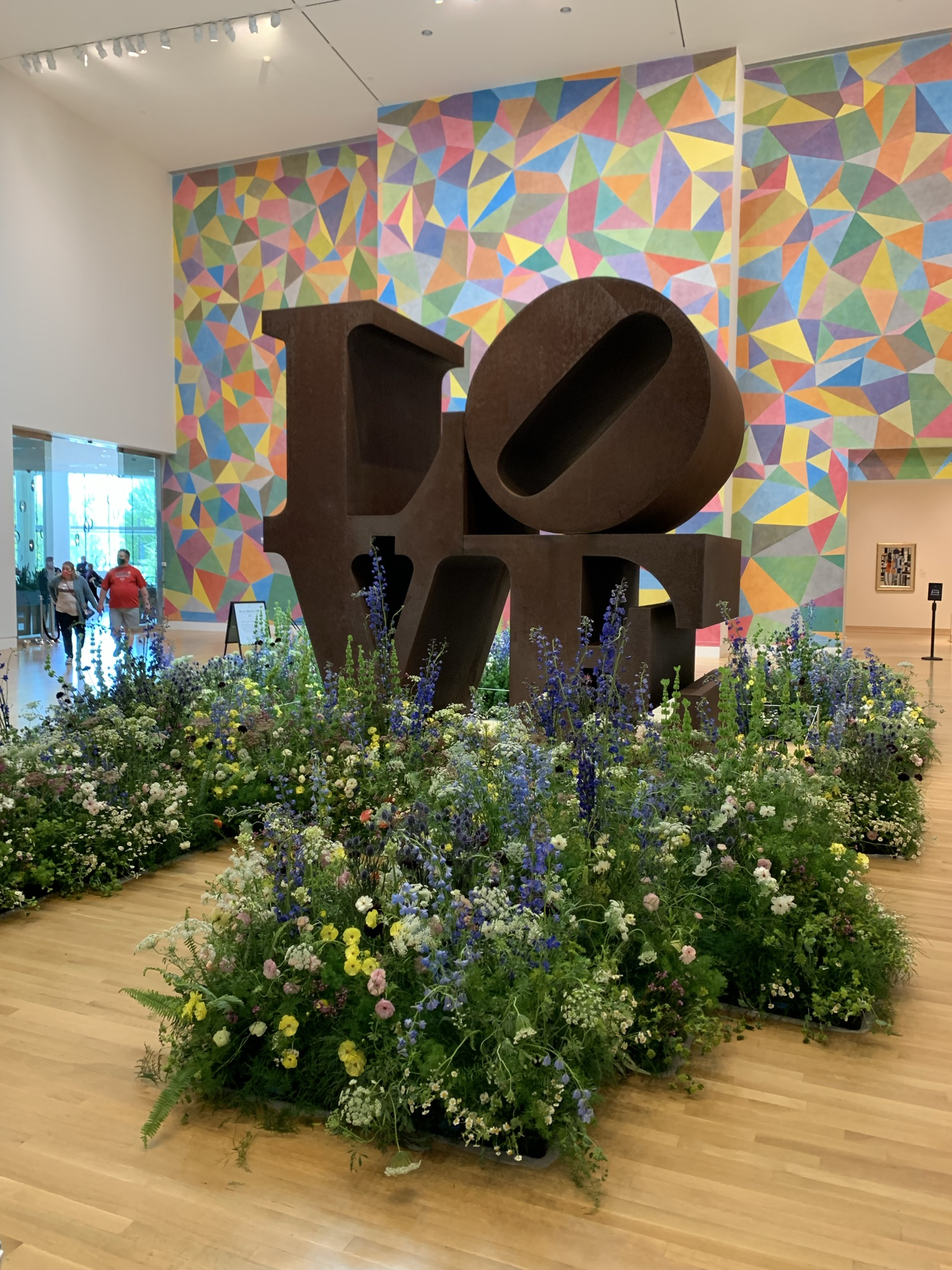
The original LOVE statue (1970) by Robert Indiana during Newfields' "Art in Bloom" show in the foreground and Wall Drawing No. 652 (1990) by Sol LeWitt in the background

The Pulliam Family Great Hall houses several large scale works of art and is the main access point to the majority of the museum's galleries. The hall is used for events, including chamber music performances and weddings.

The hall is the home of the original, 12-foot-tall (3.7 m) LOVE sculpture by artist Robert Indiana. This is the largest of these sculptures in the world and a popular destination for visitors.

==== Clowes Pavilion ====
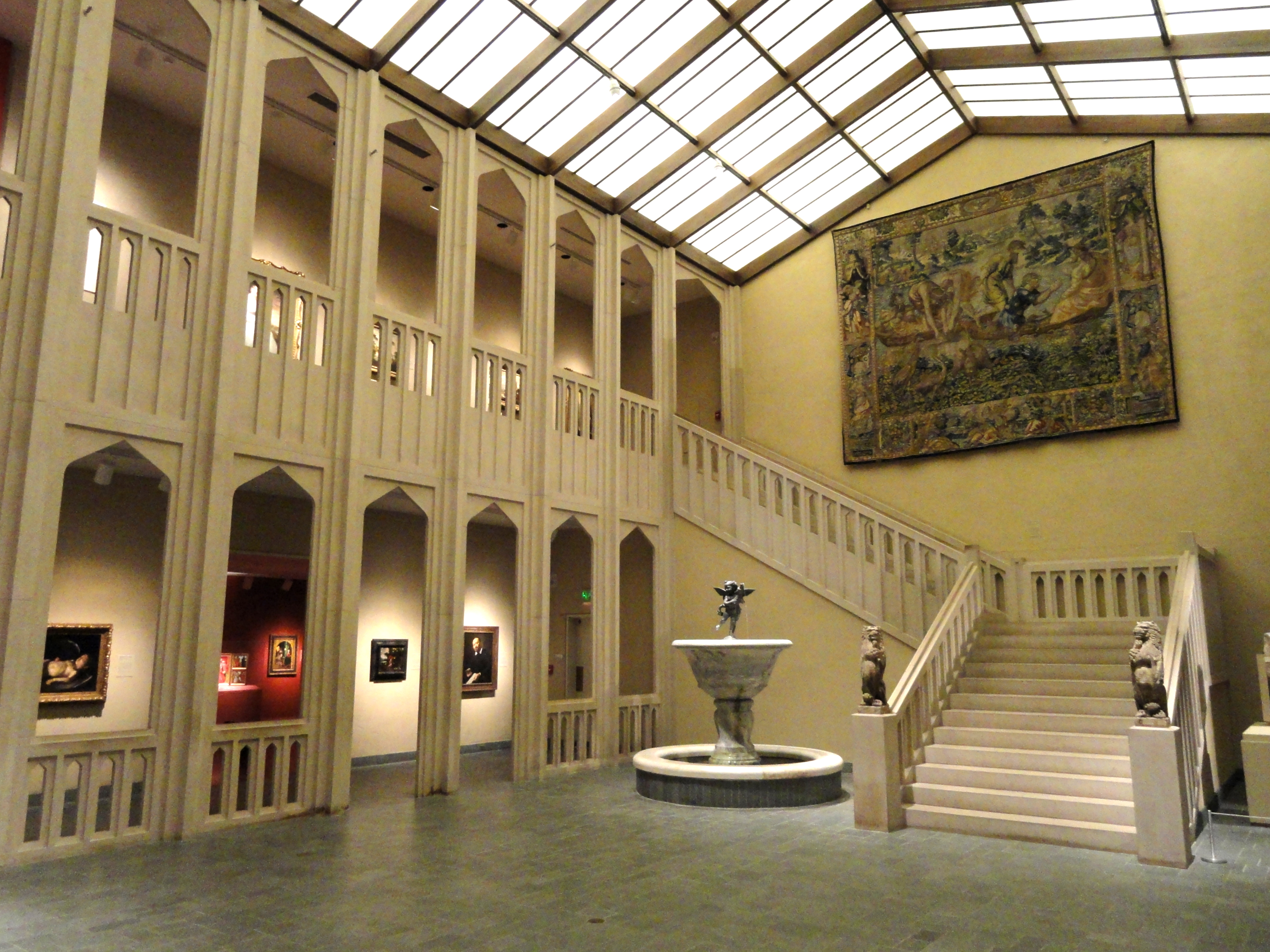
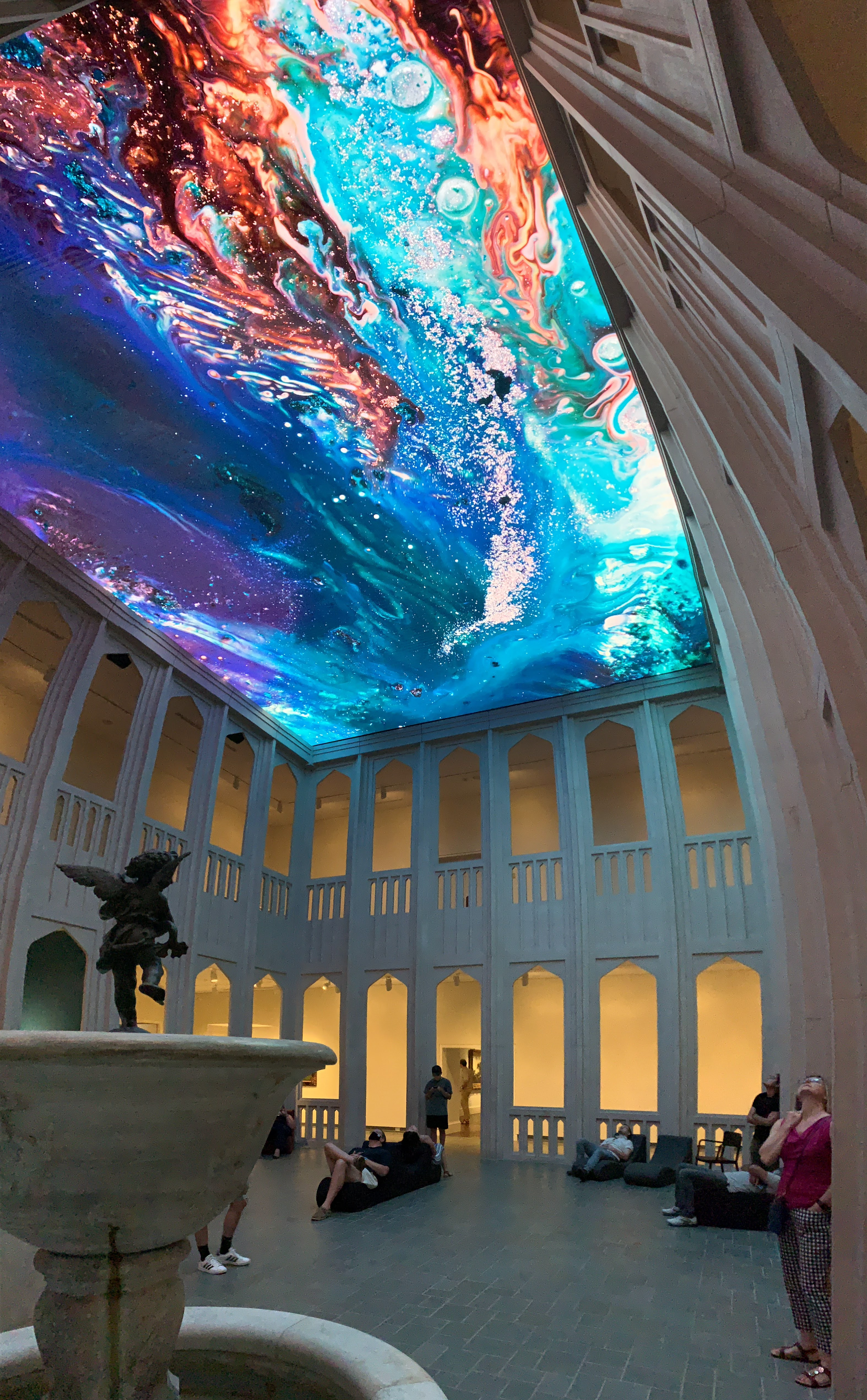
Interior views of the Clowes Pavilion (left) in 2011 and (right) after renovations in 2022.

Opened in 1972, the Clowes (/kluːz/) Pavilion is dedicated to the collection of the Clowes family, which includes many of the Old Masters, and contains several of the IMA's most notable works, including Rembrandt's Self-portrait (1629) and three of El Greco's saint portraits (Saint Matthew, Saint Luke, and Saint Simon). The area is divided into small rooms lining a limestone indoor courtyard. The pavilion was closed from 2019 to March 2022 for renovations including updating electrical capabilities, redoing the floor and ceiling, and performing conservation work on the art. This also included the addition of a second entrance and the installation of a 47-foot (14 m) by 31-foot (9.4 m) LED screen that covers the entire ceiling above the courtyard.

=== The Virginia B. Fairbanks Art & Nature Park ===
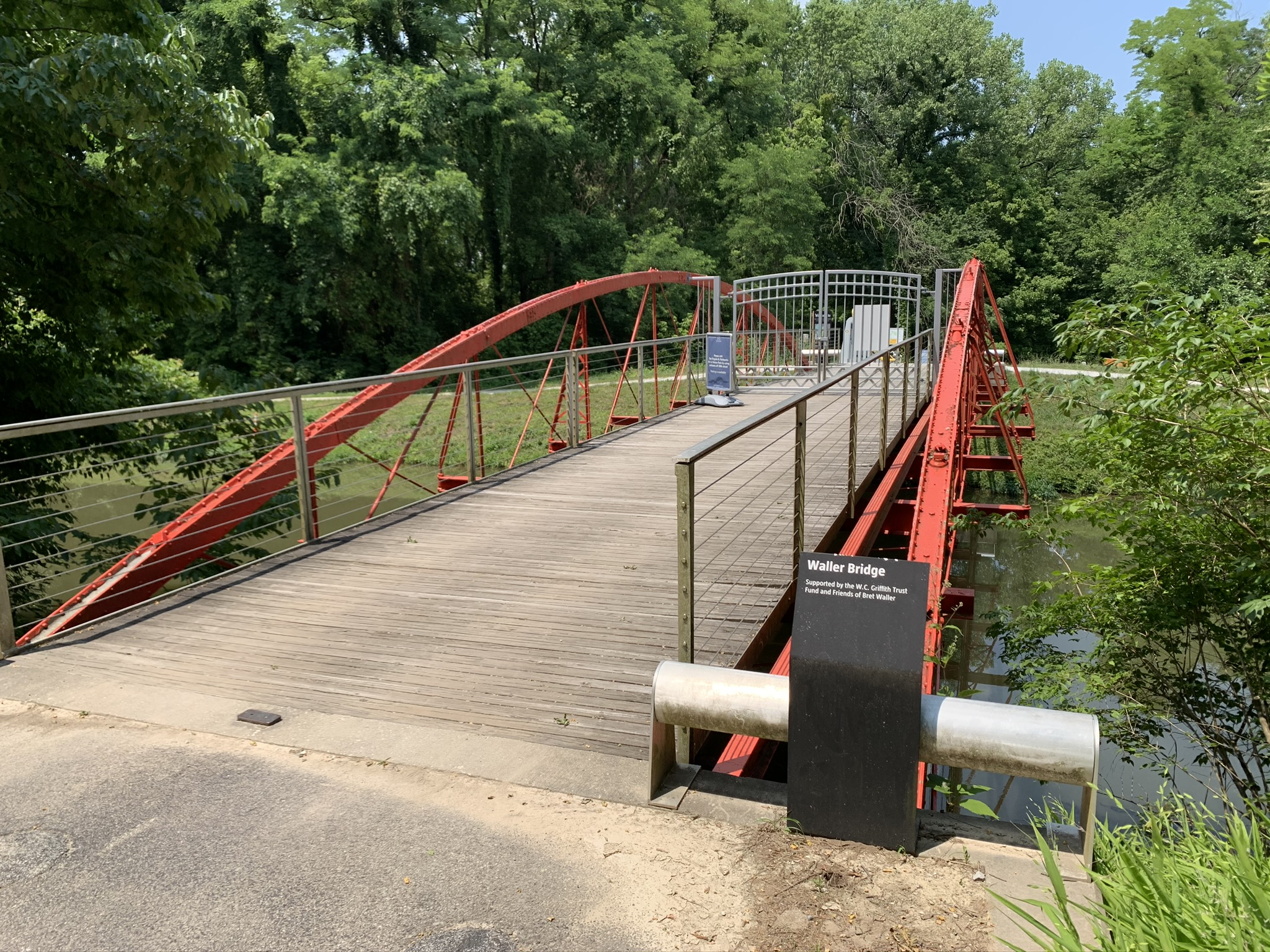
Waller Bridge, which connects the Virginia B. Fairbanks Art & Nature Park to the rest of the Newfields campus.

Formerly a gravel pit, the Virginia B. Fairbanks Art & Nature Park officially opened on June 20, 2010. The large-scale outdoor project now encompasses a diverse landscape, including wooded areas, wetlands, open fields, a lake and a series of hiking trails that guide visitors past site-specific works of contemporary art. It is surrounded by the White River to the north and west, 38th Street to the south, and the Indiana Central Canal to the east. Waller Bridge spans the canal, connecting the park to the rest of the Newfields campus. Fairbanks Park is one of the largest art parks in the country and is the only park to feature an ongoing commission of temporary works.

The first eight artists selected to create site-responsive pieces were Atelier Van Lieshout, Kendall Buster, Alfredo Jaar, Jeppe Hein, Los Carpinteros, Tea Mäkipää, Type A, and Andrea Zittel. Lieshout's contribution was Funky Bones, a large sculpture consisting of twenty white and black bone-shaped fiberglass benches. The sculpture was featured in the book The Fault in Our Stars by Indianapolis-based author John Green, as well as the movie adaptation. Los Carpinteros' contribution, Free Basket marks the secondary entrance to Newfields on the south side of the park. These artists' works, along with an LEED certified visitor center, are linked by a number of walking trails.

=== Lilly House ===
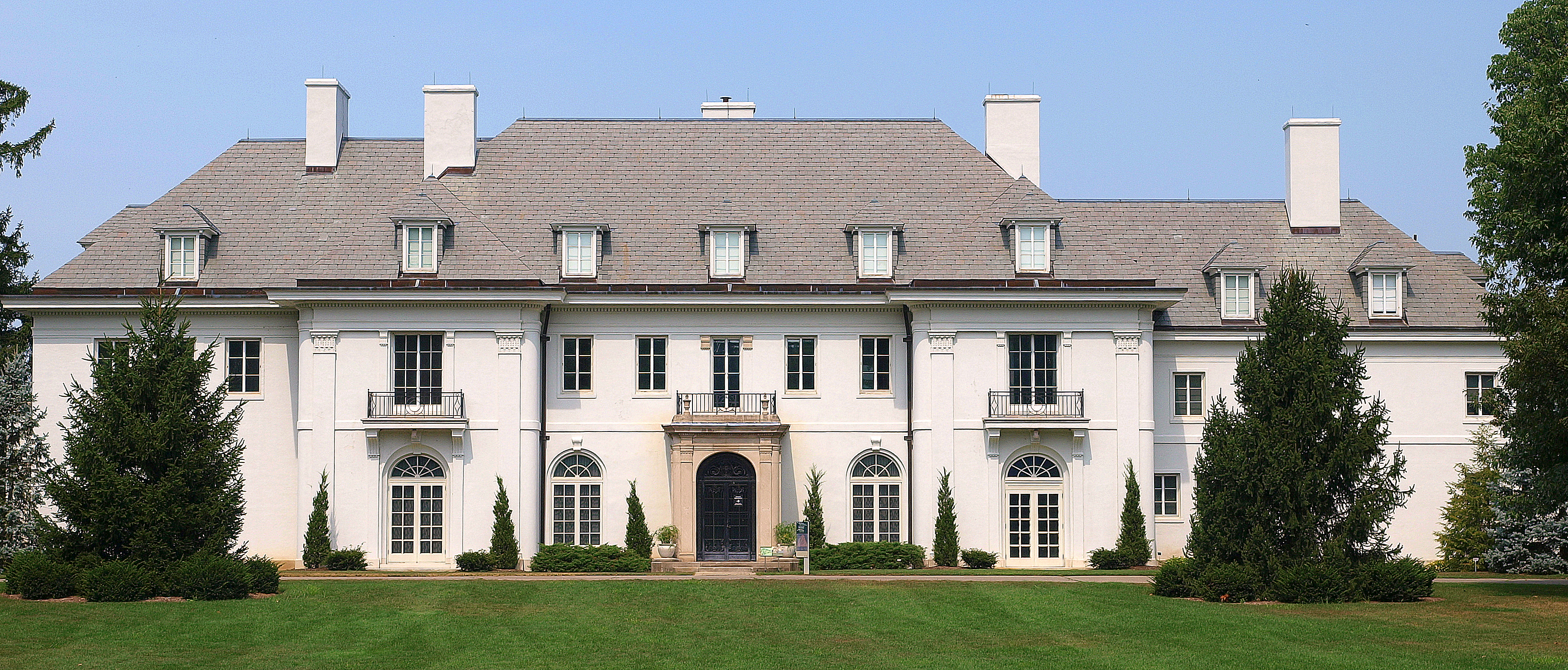
Main facade of Lilly House

Lilly House, also referred to as Oldfields, is a 26-acre (11 ha) historic estate and house museum on the Newfields campus. The gardens and grounds were restored by the museum in the 1990s. Together with the restoration of the mansion in 2002, Oldfields is now a rare example of a surviving American Country Place Era estate. The estate was designated a U.S. National Historic Landmark in 2003 and has been described as a Gesamtkunstwerk, a unified work of art that combines the arts of landscape design, gardening, architecture, interior design, and decorative arts. Oldfields was built between 1910 and 1913 by architect Lewis Ketcham Davis for the family of Hugh McKennan Landon, who occupied the home from 1913 until 1932 when Landon sold it to J. K. Lilly Jr. Lilly, the late Indianapolis businessman, collector, and philanthropist, renovated and expanded the estate throughout the 1930s and 1940s, updating interiors as well as adding a number of new buildings to the grounds. The 22-room mansion has undergone historic restoration and is currently interpreted to reflect the 1930s era when the Lilly family occupied the residence. In addition to the home's significance as a representation of the American country house movement, Oldfields' gardens and grounds are a rare example of a preserved estate landscape designed by Percival Gallagher of the Olmsted Brothers firm.

=== The Garden at Newfields ===
The outdoor areas east of the Indiana Central Canal are collectively known as The Garden at Newfields. The campus contains distinctive features that have been modified over time to create a greater connection between the museum building and The Garden. Immediately outside the museum is the Sutphin Mall and Fountain. The Sutphin Mall previously featured the original rendering of the iconic pop art sculpture Love designed by Robert Indiana. The sculpture has since been moved inside for preservation reasons. It is now the site of Five Brushstrokes by Roy Lichtenstein. At the end of mall, opposite the IMA building, is the wheelchair accessible Garden for Everyone. A bronze sculpture, La Hermana del Hombre Bóveda (Sister of the Vault Man) is displayed in the center of the garden.

The Richard D. Wood Formal Garden, the Rapp Family Ravine Garden, the Allée, and the Border Gardens are historical gardens bordering the Lilly House. The Formal Garden features a fountain, arbors, and plantings. Modified by Percival Gallagher from the original landscape design of Oldfield, its current name is in honor of Newfields trustee and former CEO of Eli Lilly and Company, Richard D. Wood. The Ravine Garden was designed by Gallagher, and connects the Lilly estate to the Indiana Central Canal, which divides the Gardens from the Virginia B. Fairbanks Art & Nature Park. The Lilly Allée is a 775-foot (236 m) lawn directly in front of the Lilly House, lined with 58 red oak trees, that ends in a circular pool and fountain. On either side of the Allée are the Border Gardens, a heavily shaded area with winding paths.

Other nature areas include the Tanner Orchard, the Dickinson Four Seasons Garden, Nonie's Garden, and the Rain Garden.

=== Madeline F. Elder Greenhouse, the Playhouse, and the Garden Terrace ===
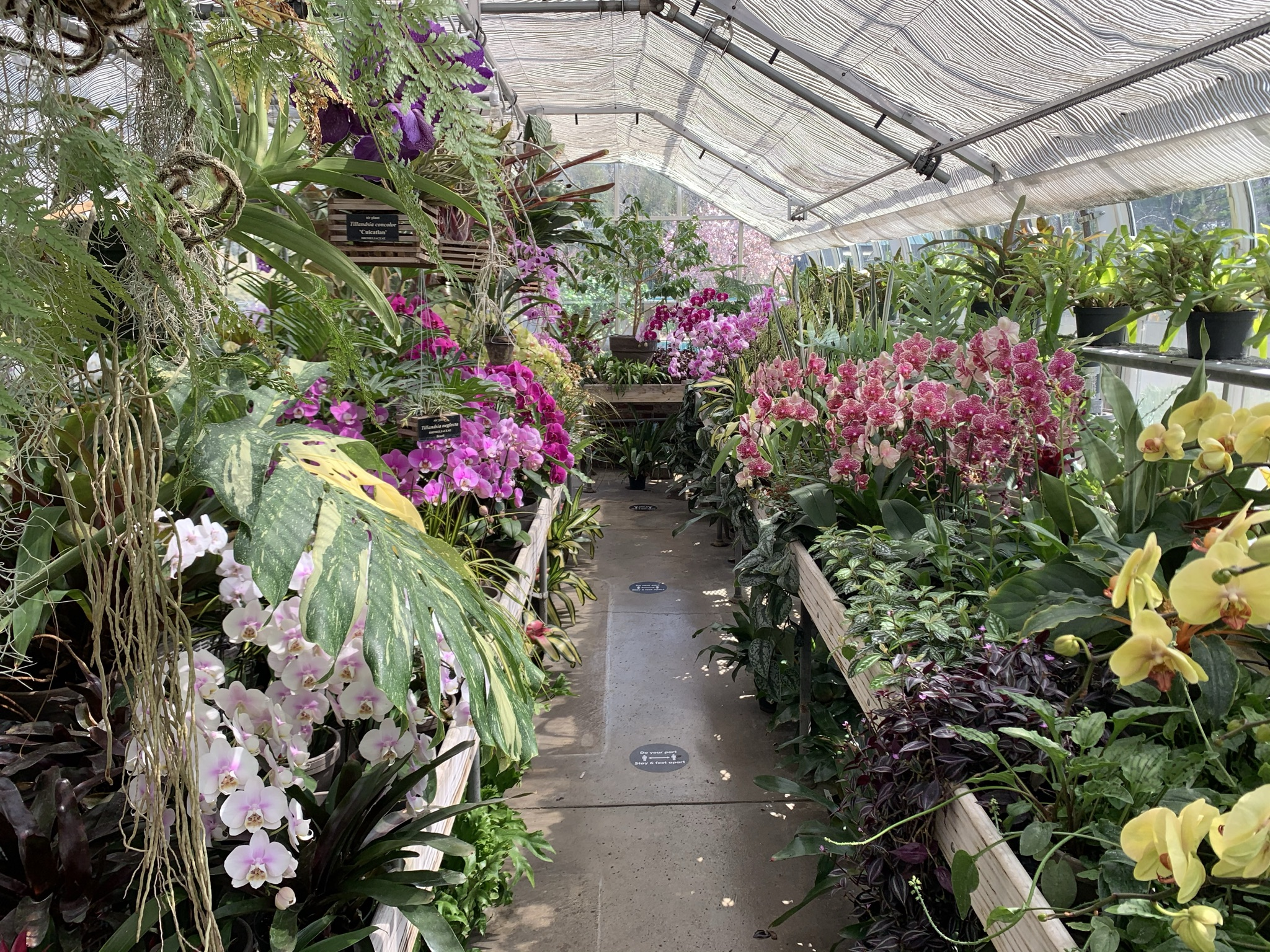
Looking down an aisle at the Madeline F. Elder Greenhouse in 2021

The Madeline F. Elder Greenhouse originally provided plants and produce to the residents of the Oldfield estate. The present structure was constructed in the late 1940s. In addition to the plants, the greenhouse was also the site of the Beer Garden starting in March 2017. In 2022, the Beer Garden was moved to the Playhouse, a larger location closer to the main museum building, next to what the Lilly's had called the Recreation Building. The move also coincided with the Beer Garden being renamed the "Garden Terrace". The Garden Terrace features rotating taps of seasonal beers and ciders, including Among the Leaves, a custom beer from Indianapolis-based Sun King Brewing Co. only available at Newfields.

=== Sites off the main campus ===
==== The Miller House and Garden ====
The Miller House is a Mid-Century modern home designed by Eero Saarinen and located in Columbus, Indiana. The residence was commissioned by American industrialist, philanthropist, and architecture patron J. Irwin Miller and his wife Xenia Simons Miller in 1953. Design and construction on the Miller House took four years and was completed in 1957. The home was declared a National Historic Landmark in 2000. In 2009, the home and gardens, along with many of the original furnishings, were donated to the Indianapolis Museum of Art by the Miller family. In addition to Eero Saarinen, the house and gardens showcase the work of leading 20th-century figures such as interior designer Alexander Girard, landscape architect Dan Kiley, and principal design associate at the Saarinen office, Kevin Roche.

==== Westerley House and gardens ====
Located just south of the museum at 3744 Spring Hollow Road in the Golden Hill neighborhood, Westerley House is the former home of George H. A. Clowes and wife Edith, and their son, Allen Clowes. Designed by architect Frederick Wallick and built in 1922, the four-story home consists of 20 rooms as well as a carriage house, a greenhouse, and the surrounding grounds. Allen Clowes died in 2000 and bequeathed the estate to the museum, intending it to serve as an event space and the home for the IMA director. In 2006, the estate underwent a US$2 million renovation, with a major gift of $800,000 by the Allen Whitehill Clowes Foundation and an anonymous donor. The renovation was headed by Indianapolis-based architects Rowland Design, construction company Shiel Sexton, and interior designer Jacqueline Anderson, who is married to former IMA director Maxwell Anderson. In 2007, the first floor and grounds were a space for museum events, while the IMA director and family lived on the second and third floors. Westerley historically served as a venue for the Clowes family to showcase their fine art collection, which eventually became the foundation for the IMA's early European collection. Upon the renovation, Jacqueline Anderson chose to continue the display of selected Clowes' pieces alongside the couple's collection of contemporary art.

Charles L. Venable lived in the house during his directorship at Newfields until he left in 2021. Before leaving, he had stated a desire to move out of the house as part of an effort from Newfields to save money and for the director to have a less public-facing residence. In May 2022, about a year after his departure, the house was put on sale for $2.2 million and sold over list price within a week.

== Collections ==
Newfields has a permanent collection of over 54,000 works that represent cultures from around the world and span over 5,000 years. Areas of the collection include: European painting and sculpture; American painting and sculpture; prints, drawings, and photographs; Asian art; art of Africa, the South Pacific, and the Americas; ancient art of the Mediterranean; Design Arts; textile and fashion arts; and contemporary art. The museum holds a significant collection of Neo-Impressionist paintings and prints, many of which were given in 1977 by local industrialist W. J. Holliday. Combined with the Neo-Impressionist collection is the Samuel Josefowitz Collection of Gauguin and the School of Pont-Aven, which includes highlights such as Bretons in a Ferryboat by Émile Bernard. The IMA also holds a large collection of works by J.M.W. Turner, containing highlights such as the 1820 watercolor, Rosslyn Castle. The collection, which was formed by a substantial donation by philanthropist Kurt Pantzer in 1979, includes over fifty watercolors, as well as oil paintings, prints, and etchings.

The European collection, which is organized into works before 1800 and works from 1800 to 1945, includes highlights such as Aristotle by Jusepe de Ribera and The Flageolet Player on the Cliff by Paul Gauguin. Rembrandt's Self-Portrait is part of the Clowes Fund Collection, which comprises a number of significant Old Masters pieces. Part of the Neo-Impressionist collection, The Channel of Gravelines, Petit Fort Philippe by Georges Seurat was one of the first works to be donated by Caroline Marmon Fesler in the 1940s. Fesler would go on to donate a number of important works, including her bequest in 1961 of notable 20th-century modernism pieces that included Pablo Picasso, Chagall, and Matisse. Pieces in the American collection represent American Impressionism and Modernism, including works by Georgia O'Keeffe and George Inness. Significant pieces include Hotel Lobby (1943) by Edward Hopper and Boat Builders by Winslow Homer.

The museum has a substantial Asian art collection, with more than 5,000 pieces spanning 4,000 years. Most notable is the IMA's acclaimed collection of Japanese Edo Period paintings, scrolls, and screens. Highlights include A Thousand Peaks and Myriad Ravines, a Ming Dynasty work by Wu Bin, and Buddhist, Daoist, and Confucian Patriarchs, an Edo period panel by Kano Sanraku, in addition to a number of Chinese ceramics and bronzes that were donated by Eli Lilly in 1961, such as a fine Shang bronze guang.

The collection is also made up of more than 2,000 pieces of African art and artifacts, 1,200 of which were donated by Harrison Eiteljorg in 1989. The IMA has expanded the collection to include both historical and contemporary objects from every major region of Africa, including Egypt. The museum is unique in its inclusive display of Islamic and ancient Egyptian works within the African gallery, rather than with Greek or Roman antiquities. Significant pieces include a female ancestor figure of the Senufo people and Magbo helmet mask for Oro association by master carver Onabanjo of Itu Meko. Also notable within the African art collection is one of the thousands of Benin Bronzes stolen from the Nigerian Kingdom of Benin during a British colonial raid in 1897. The plaque was purchased by Harrison Eiteljorg in 1977 and donated by him to the museum in 1989. While the museum acknowledged in public signage on display in October 2022 that the plaque was stolen from Benin, and as of May 2022 reported to be in talks with Nigerian cultural institutions, no formal plans for its restitution have been announced.

The museum's textile and fashion art collection is made up of 7,000 items, including 20th-century, custom-designed costumes by Givenchy, Chanel, and Balmain. The collection includes a number of the world's fabric traditions, including African textiles donated by sisters Eliza and Sarah Niblack between 1916 and 1933 and a significant collection of Baluchi rugs. Based on the museum's early history of collecting textiles, items range from couture to silks and antique laces spanning 500 years. Some notable pieces include an Imperial Russian court dress by designer Charles Frederick Worth and Bodhisattva of Wisdom (Mañjusri), a Ming Dynasty silk panel. The museum's Design Arts collection is made up of European and American pieces from the Renaissance to the present. The collection includes Eliel Saarinen's sideboard designed in 1929 for The Metropolitan Museum of Art exhibition The Architect and the Industrial Arts: An Exhibition of Contemporary American Design and the Bubbles chaise longue designed by Frank Gehry in 1979 for the Experimental Edges Series. In 2018, the museum added a Sevres lunch service to its decorative arts collection.

Starting in the late 2000s the IMA began to focus on developing its contemporary art collection, which includes works such as Two White Dots in the Air by Alexander Calder and Light and Space III, a permanent installation by Robert Irwin located in the Pulliam Great Hall. Since 2007 the museum has featured site-specific contemporary installations in the Efroymson Pavilion, rotating the temporary works every six months. The Efroymson Pavilion has featured works by artists such as William Lamson, Ball-Nogues Studio, Orly Genger, and Heather Rowe. Contemporary art is also featured in 100 Acres: The Virginia B. Fairbanks Art and Nature Park, which is unique in its inclusion of commissioned works by emerging mid-career artists.

Since 2007, the IMA has built a modern design collection that illustrates the artistic merits of utilitarian objects. The focus on international contemporary design, combined with the opening of the Miller House in 2011, has positioned the museum as an authority on design, with the museum's design gallery being the largest of its kind.

=== Transparency ===
Former director and CEO Max Anderson spoke of the need to shift away from museums that "collect, preserve, and interpret", encouraging the IMA and other institutions to instead "gather, steward, and converse" in a way that increases accountability and responsiveness. The IMA's collecting and deaccessioning practices have reflected this perspective, utilizing technology to provide public access, openness, and transparency in museum operations. Unveiled in March 2009, the museum's online deaccession database lists every object being deaccessioned and links new acquisitions to the sold objects that provided funds for their purchase. The IMA has been praised for being the first among museums to openly share their deaccessioning practices and for including the ability to post public comments on entries in the searchable database. The IMA also developed the Association of Art Museum Director's (AAMD) Object Registry, a database that helps museums more easily abide by the 1970 UNESCO ruling that prevents illicit trafficking of antiquities. Since 2003, the IMA has systematically researched the provenance of artworks created before 1946 and acquired after 1932.

=== Selected collection highlights ===
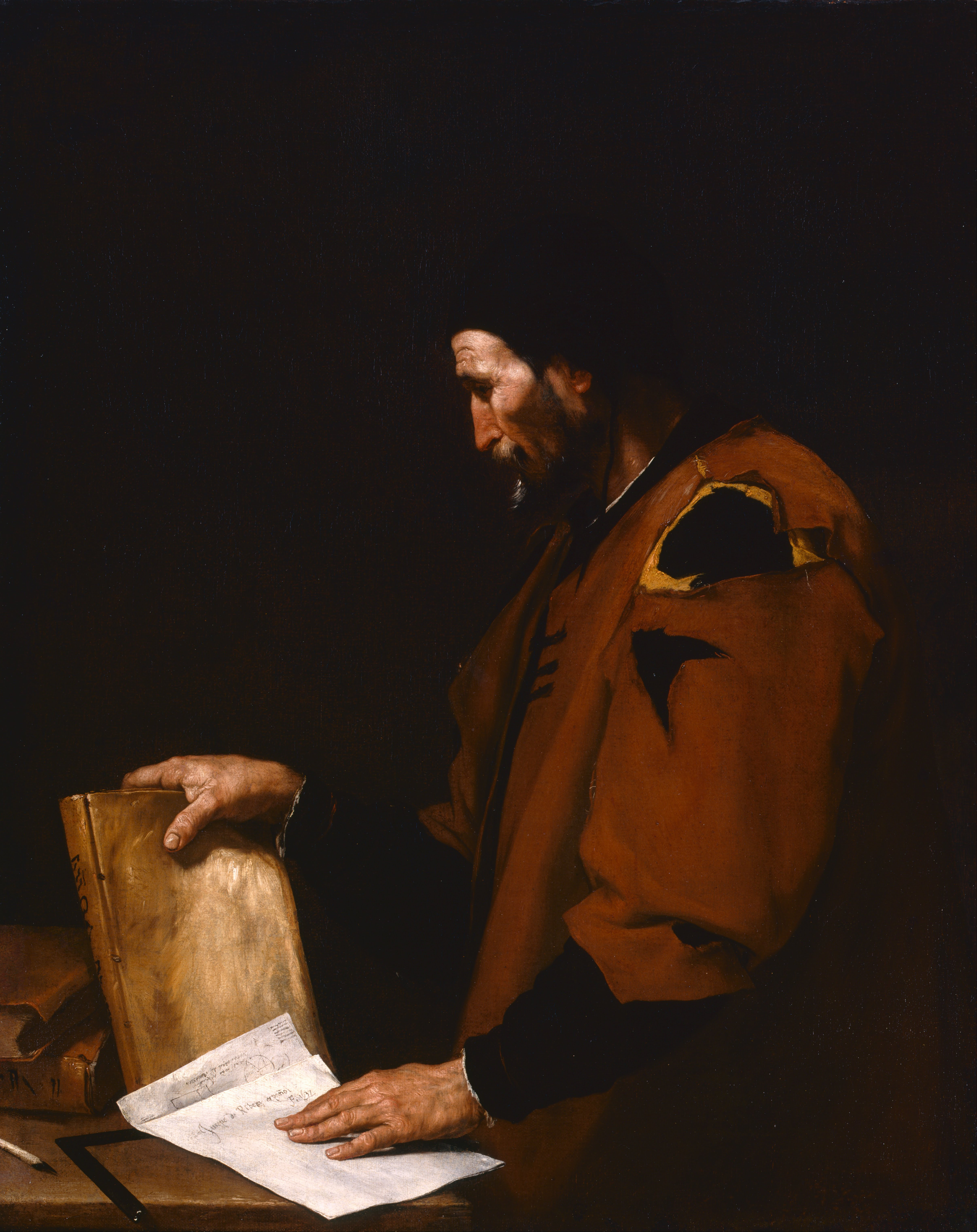
Jusepe de Ribera, Aristotle (1637)

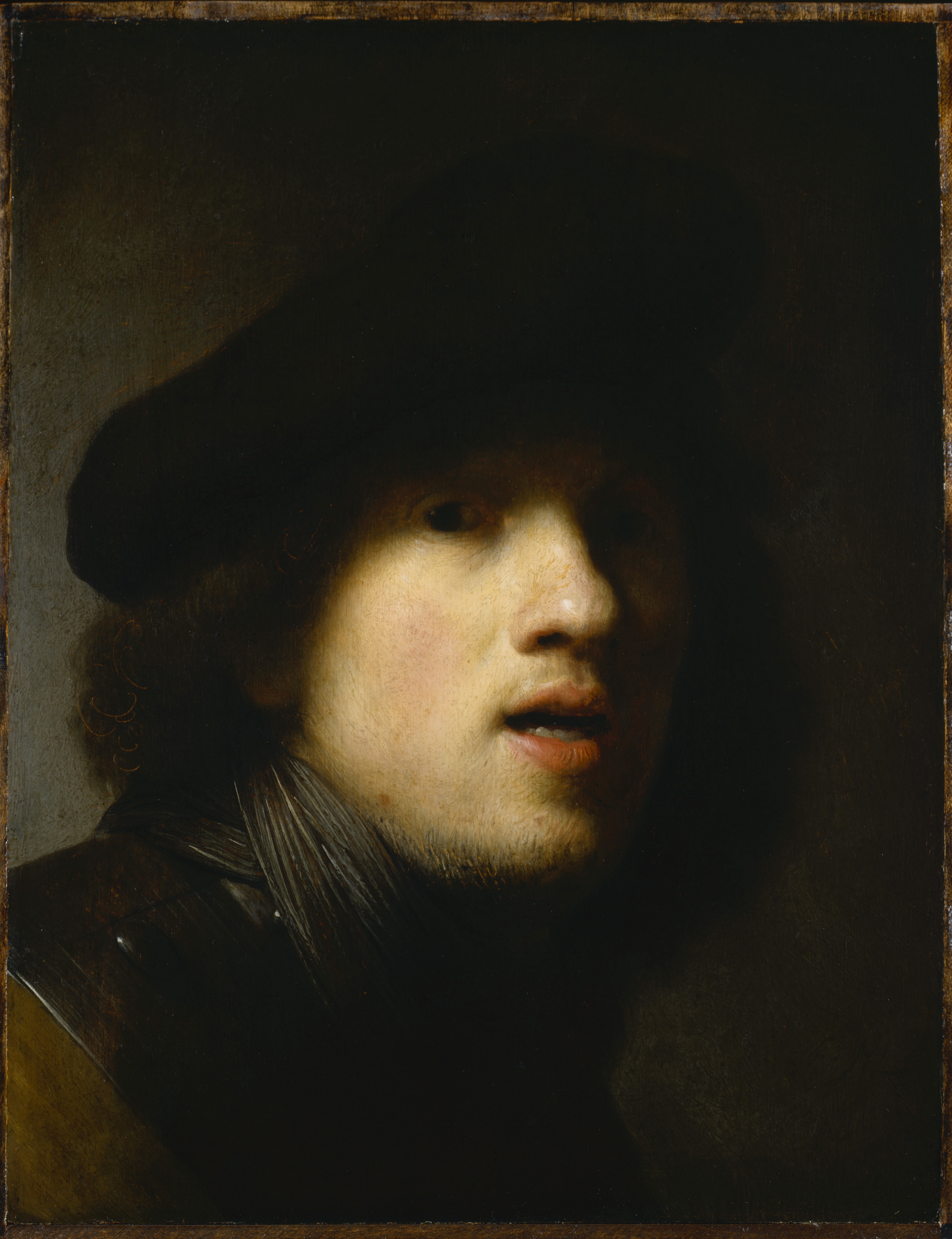
Rembrandt van Rijn, Self-portrait (1629)

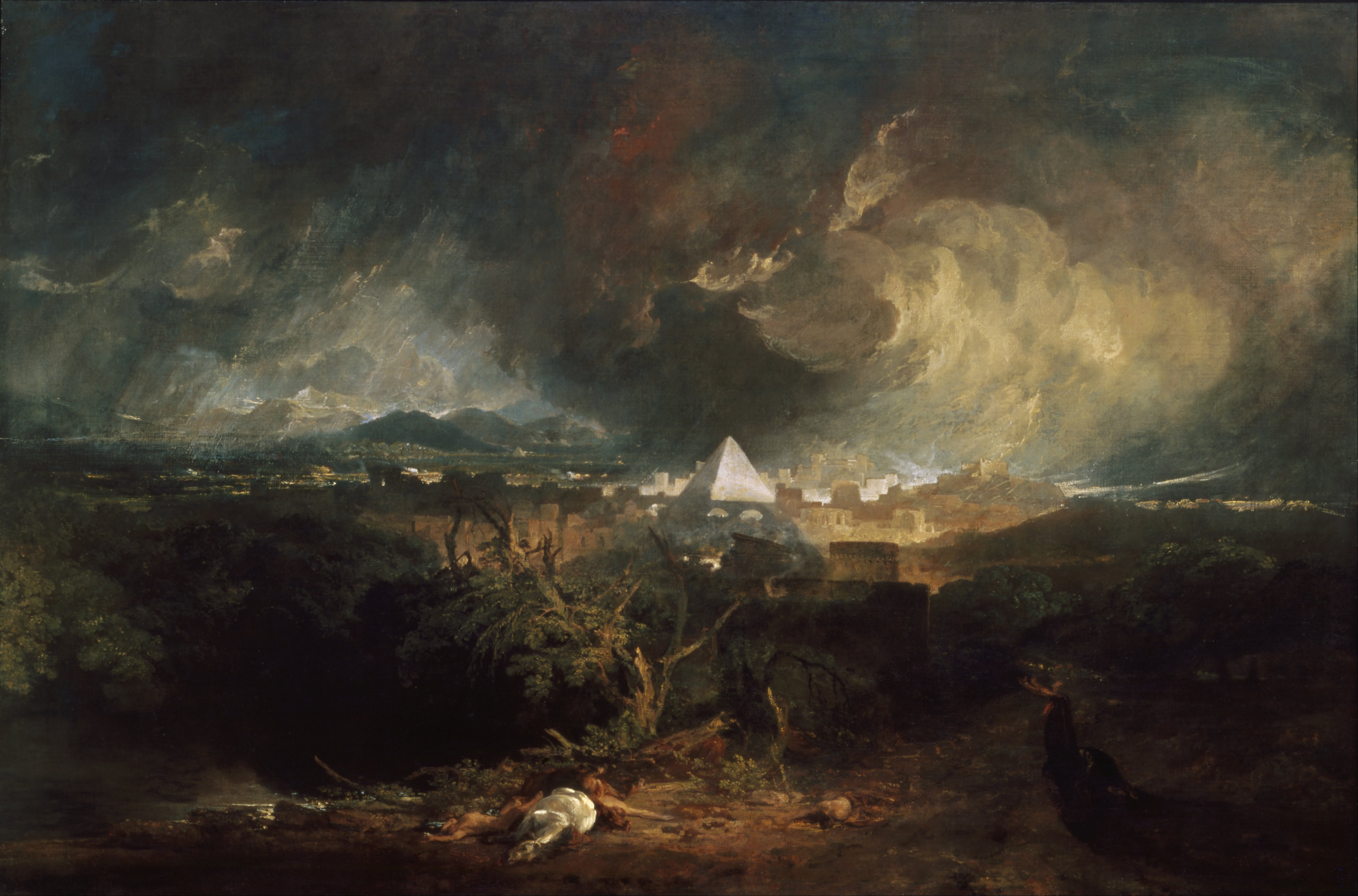
J. M. W. Turner, The Fifth Plague of Egypt (1800)

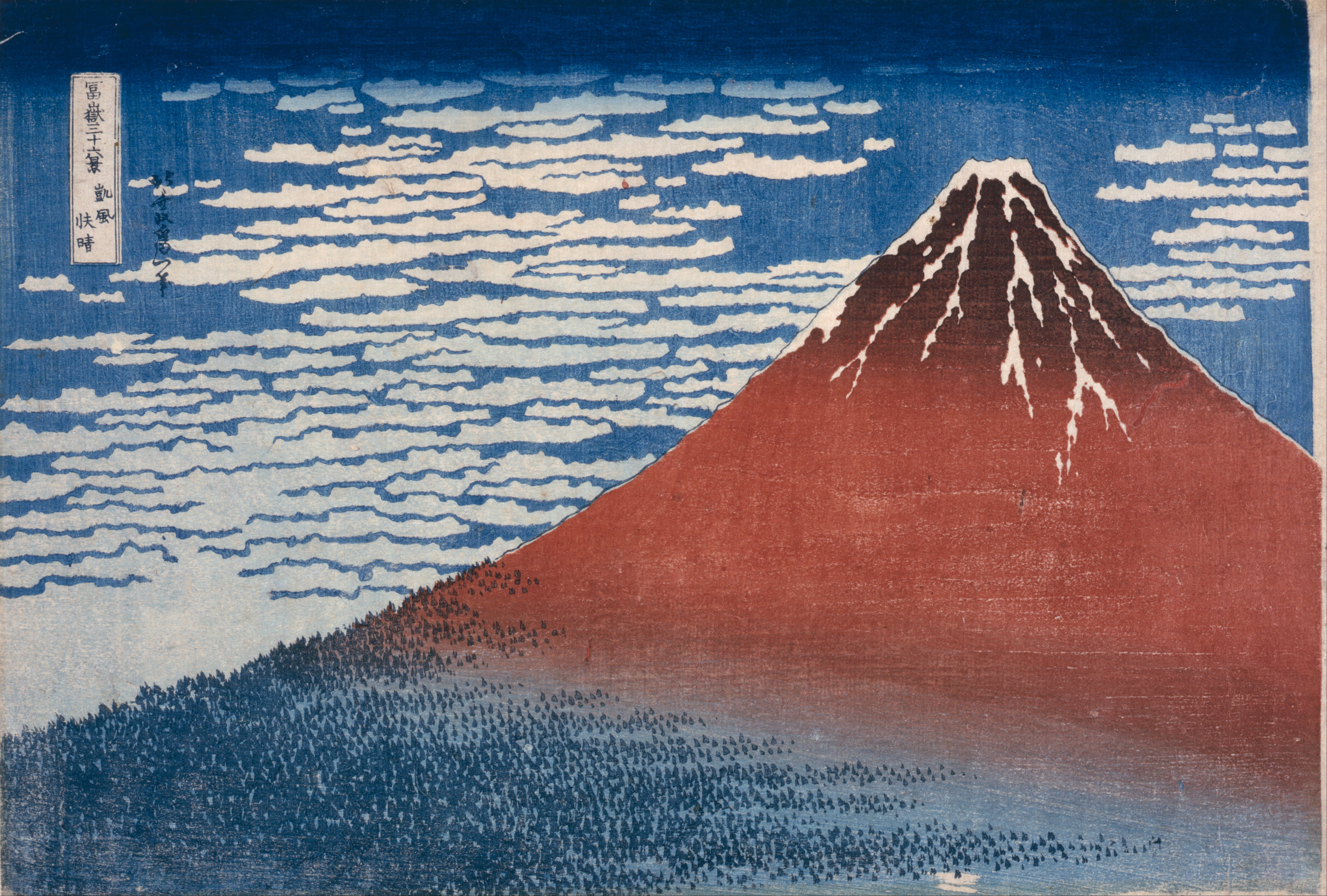
Katsushika Hokusai, Fine Wind, Clear Morning (c. 1830–1832)

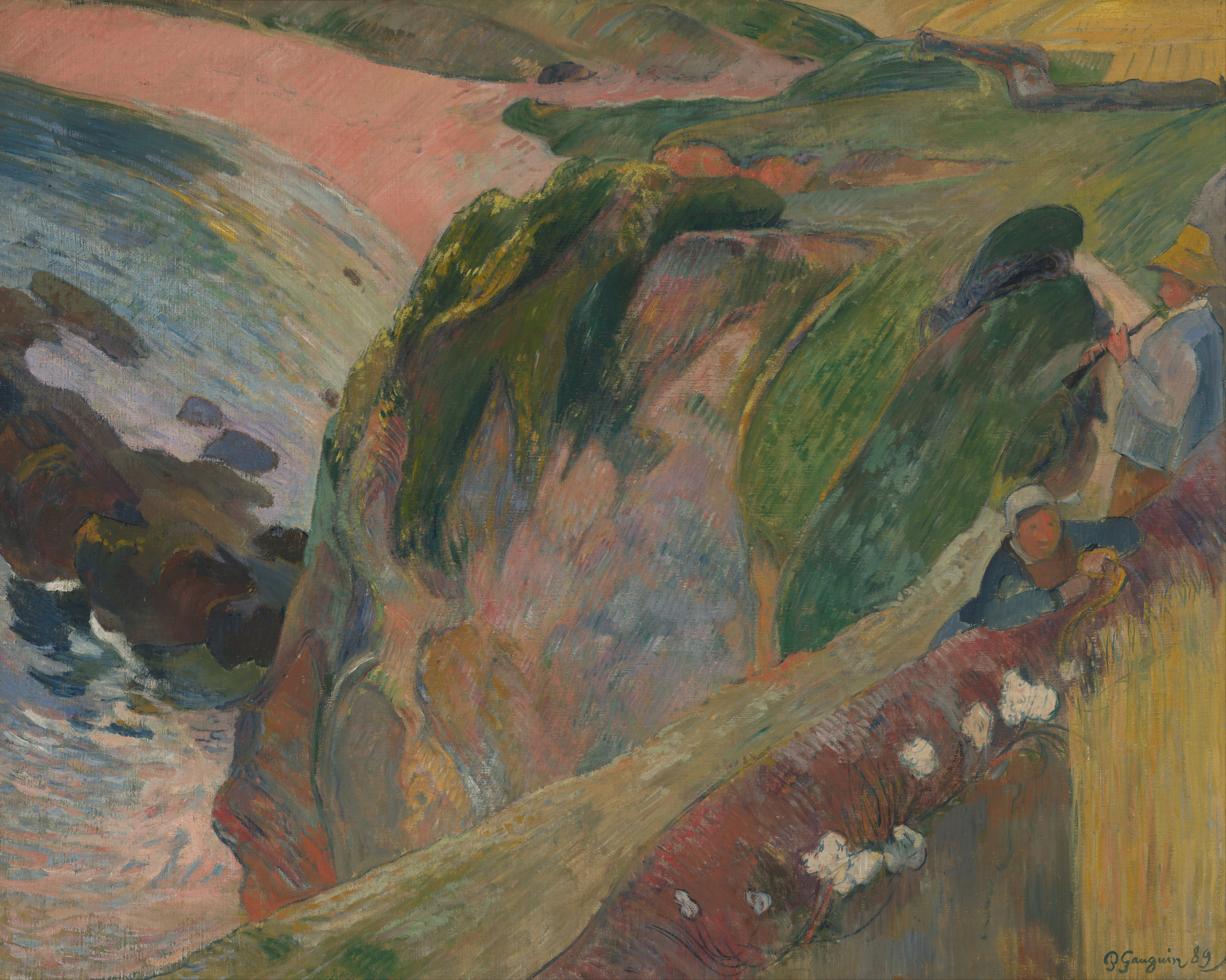
Paul Gauguin, The Flageolet Player on the Cliff (1889)

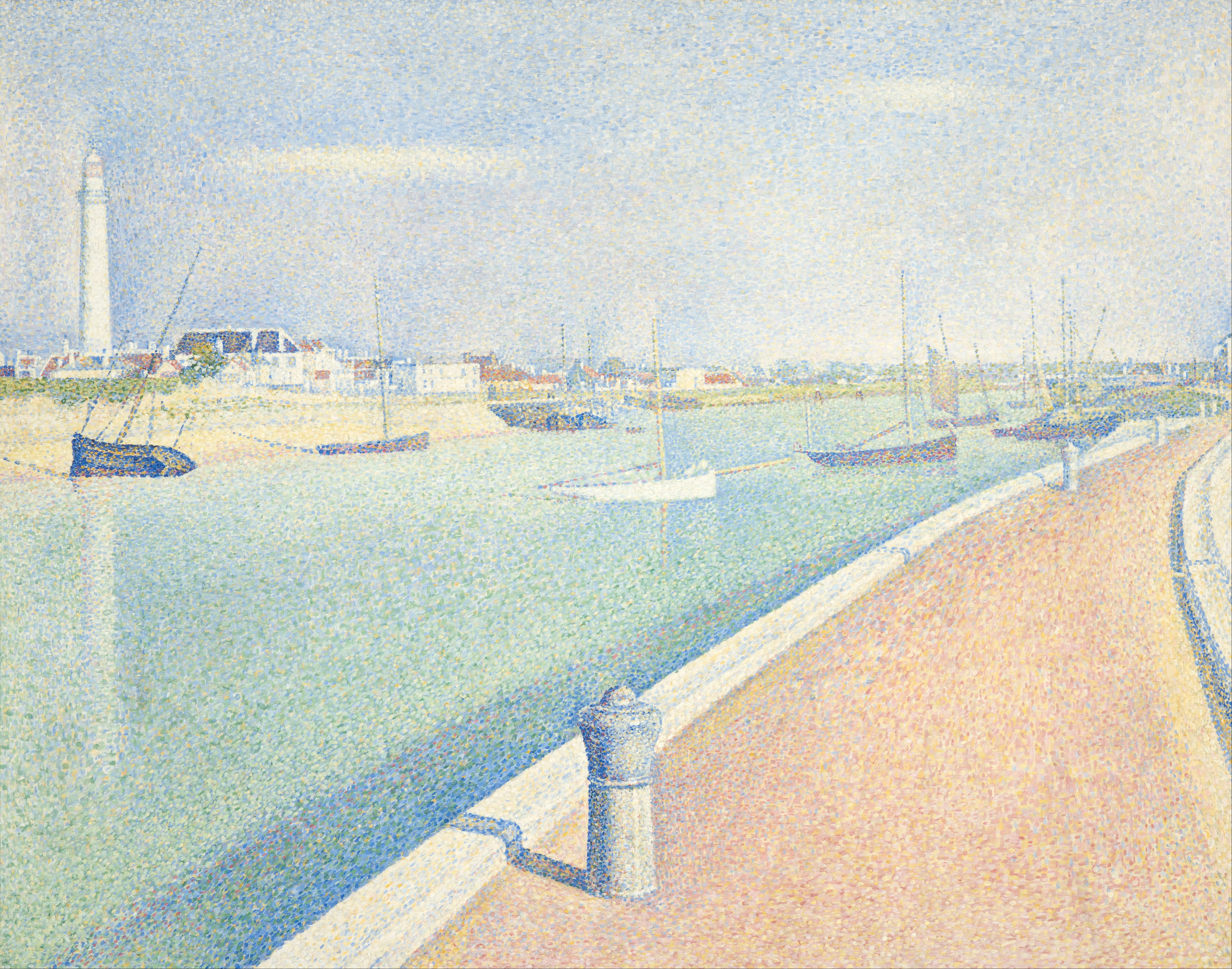
Georges Seurat, The Channel of Gravelines, Petit Fort Philippe (1890)

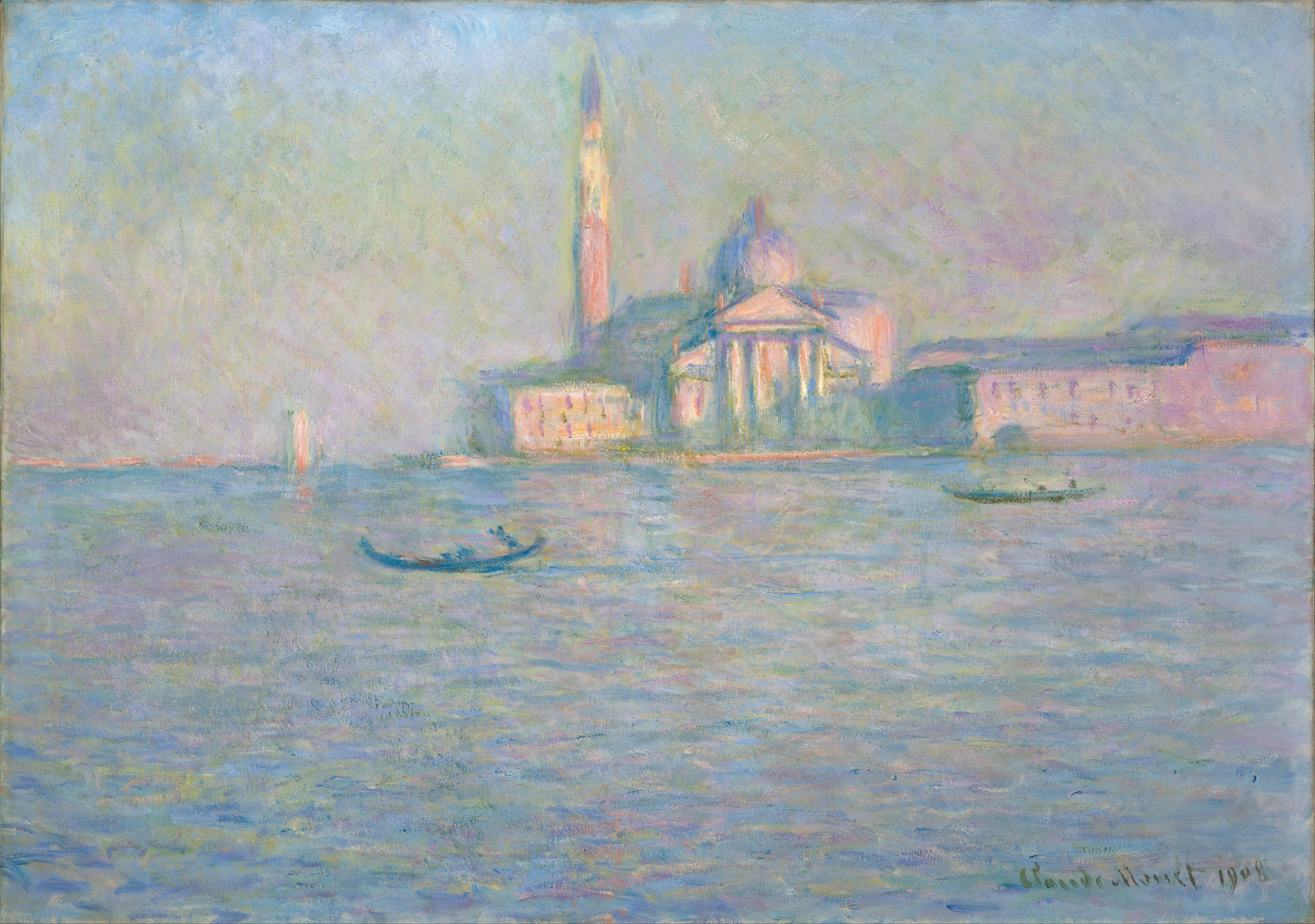
Claude Monet, The Church of San Giorgio Maggiore, Venice (1908)

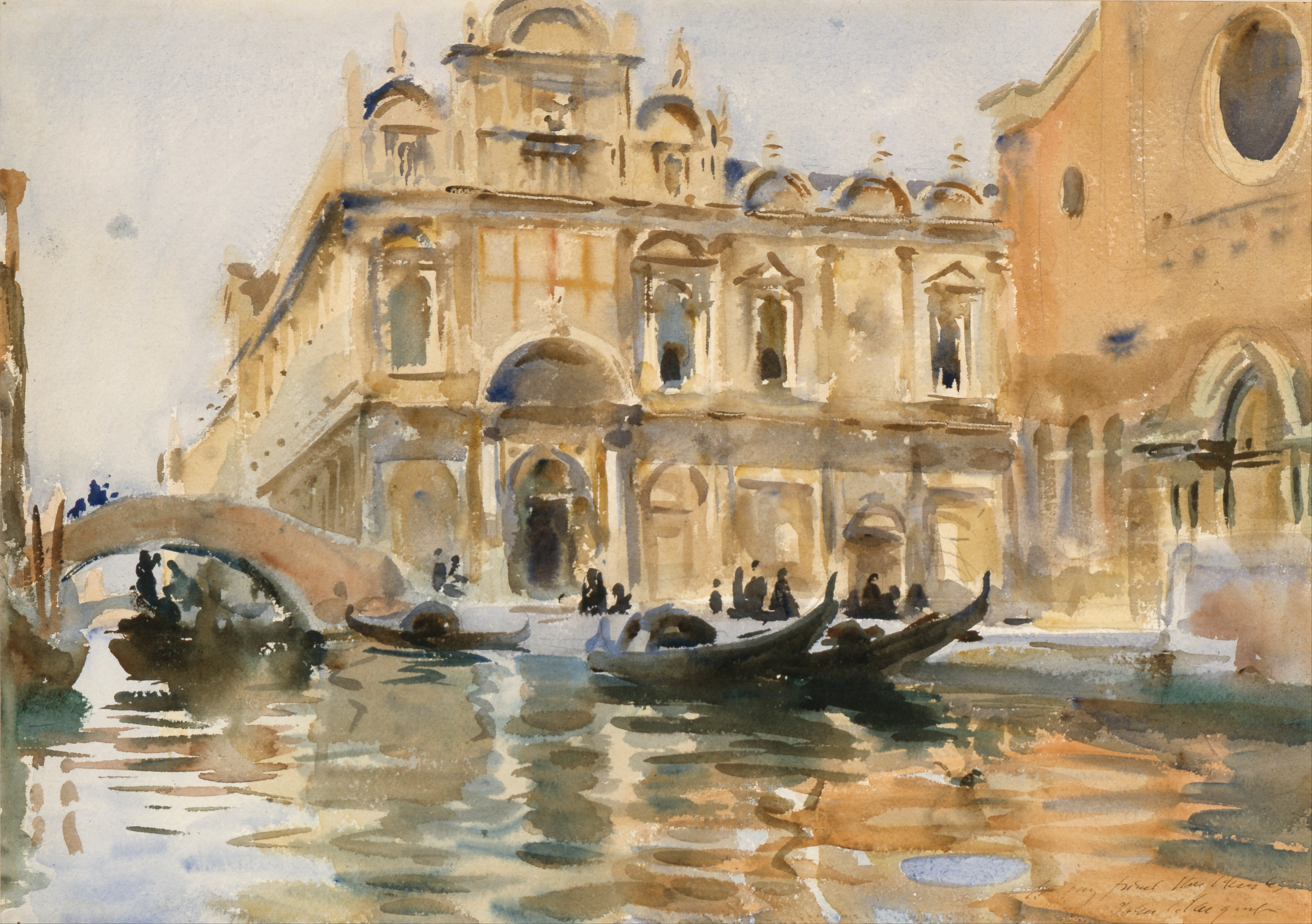
John Singer Sargent, Rio dei Mendicanti, Venice (c. 1909)

Pablo Picasso, Ma Jolie, Nature Morte (Musique) (1913–14)

== Exhibitions ==
In 1909 the Art Association campaigned for a major retrospective, the Augustus Saint-Gaudens Memorial Exhibition, to be brought to Indianapolis. The exhibition, also referred to as the Saint-Gaudens Memorial Exhibition of Statuary, attracted 56,000 visitors during its three-month run, well beyond the board's goal of attracting 50,000 visitors. A 1937 exhibition, Dutch Paintings of the Seventeenth Century, included loans from the Cincinnati Art Museum, the Metropolitan Museum of Art, and the Rijksmuseum in Amsterdam. The six-week exhibition presented 65 pieces, including several Rembrandts, and was considered the beginning of the museum's rise to connoisseurship.

In 1977, the IMA acquired a collection of Neo-Impressionist paintings from Indianapolis industrialist W.J. Holliday, which was presented in an exhibition in 1983 titled The Aura of Neo-Impressionism: The W.J. Holliday Collection. From 1986 to 1988, the exhibit traveled to seven cities in the United States and made one stop in Europe at the Van Gogh Museum in Amsterdam. Opening in the summer of 1987 to coincide with the Pan American Games, Art of the Fantastic: Latin America, 1920–1987 presented 125 works by artists from a variety of nations. Well-known artists such as Frida Kahlo and Roberto Matta were featured, as well as artists who had never exhibited outside their native country. The show was the first large-scale presentation of 20th-century Latin American art in the United States in over 20 years and was the museum's first contemporary exhibition to travel.

In 1992, the IMA hosted The William S. Paley Collection, a traveling exhibition organized by the Museum of Modern Art that included Impressionist, Post-Impressionist, and modern pieces collected by the late CBS news chairman William S. Paley. The exhibit helped establish the IMA as a prominent museum venue in the Midwest and brought in a record-setting 60,837 visitors. In 2001, the IMA collaborated with the Armory Museum in Moscow to organize Gifts to the Tsars, 1500–1700: Treasures from the Kremlin. The show helped the IMA form partnerships with local arts organizations, gain international exposure, and attracted a record 70,704 visitors. Another important exhibit to travel to the IMA was Roman Art from the Louvre, which attracted 106,002 visitors during its 2008 run. The exhibition featured 184 mosaics, frescoes, statues, marble reliefs, and vessels loaned from the permanent collection of the Louvre in Paris, France. It was the largest collection ever loaned from the Louvre to date, and only stopped in three U.S. cities before returning to France.

In 2009, Sacred Spain: Art and Belief in the Spanish World brought together 71 works of art from a wide variety of lenders, including Peru, Mexico, and the Prado in Spain. The exhibit was composed of a rare collection of pieces, many of which had never been on view in the United States. It featured paintings, sculpture, metalwork, and books by artists such as El Greco, Diego Velázquez, and Bartolomé Esteban Murillo. Andy Warhol Enterprises was displayed at the IMA from October 2010 to January 2011 and featured more than 150 works of art by Andy Warhol, as well as archival materials. The exhibition was the largest to illustrate Warhol's fascination with money and feature consumerism as a central theme. Visitors were able to view the progression of Warhol's career, from his beginnings as a commercial artist to his multimillion-dollar empire.

In April 2013, the IMA hosted the first full-scale retrospective of the work of Chinese activist and artist Ai Weiwei in the United States. Named Ai Weiwei: According to What? after a painting by Jasper Johns, the exhibit was curated by Sarah Urist Green, and was the largest ever at the IMA by footspace.

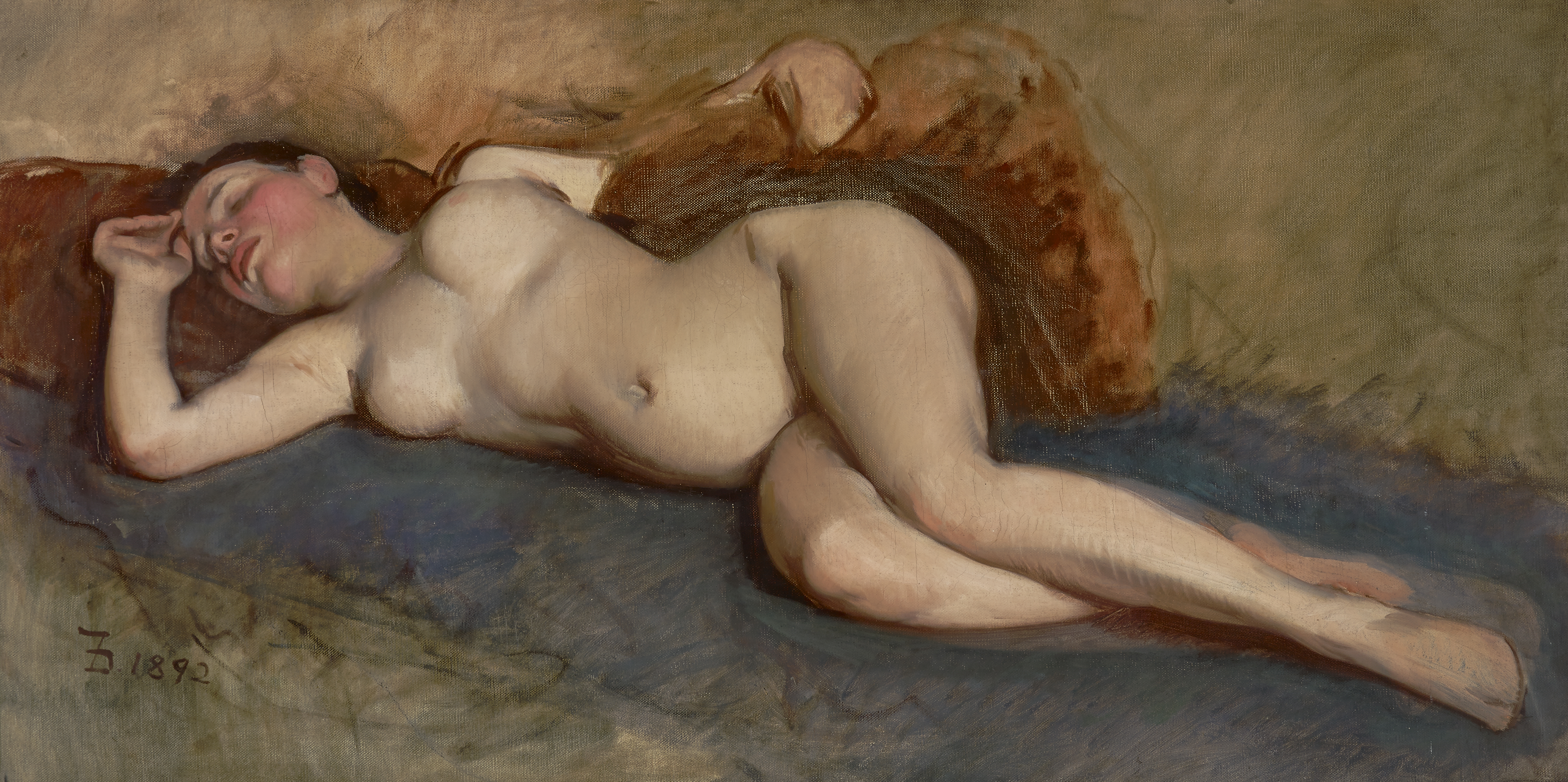
Reclining Nude (1892) by Frank Duveneck, a piece featured in the "Embodied: Human Figures in Art" exhibition in 2022.

In November 2021, Newfields announced plans to begin organizing galleries into "global thematic displays" that group works by theme, rather than time period or artistic movement. The first of these exhibitions was titled Embodied: Human Figures in Art, and began in December 2021.

=== Traveling exhibitions ===
European Design since 1985: Shaping the New Century was displayed from March 8 to June 21, 2009, and was the first major survey of contemporary European Design. The exhibition contained a collection of nearly 250 pieces by Western European industrial and decorative designers such as Philippe Starck, Marc Newson and Mathias Bengtsson. Three prominent modes of design emerged from 1985 to 2005 and could be seen in the exhibition: Geometric Minimal design, Biomorphic design and Neo-Pop design. Among the themes addressed throughout the exhibition was the question of what makes something "art" and how to distinguish a museum quality piece in a world full of mass-produced products. Rather than organizing the exhibition by designer or country, the pieces were organized based on the intellectual or philosophical precept under which they fell. After leaving the IMA, the exhibition traveled to the High Museum of Art in Atlanta and the Milwaukee Art Museum.

Hard Truths: The Art of Thornton Dial, on display from February to September 2011, included over 70 large-scale artworks and is the largest assemblage of Thornton Dial's work ever mounted. The exhibition contextualized Dial as a relevant, contemporary artist rather than a folk artist or outsider artist as many have portrayed him in the past. The pieces on view in Hard Truths covered a range of social and political themes, many of which address rural life in the south and the treatment of African Americans. After departing Indianapolis, the exhibition traveled to New Orleans, Charlotte, North Carolina and Atlanta.

=== Venice Biennale ===
In 2010, the IMA was selected to be the commissioning organization for the United States pavilion at the Venice Biennale (Biennale di Venezia). The IMA's selection over numerous other top American museums was seen as a distinguished honor for the organization as they represented the United States in the "world's most prestigious contemporary art exhibit". Lisa Freiman, senior curator and chair of the IMA's department of contemporary art at the time, organized the exhibition and served as the commissioner of the U.S. pavilion. The IMA's proposal to create an exhibition featuring the work of Puerto Rican artists Jennifer Allora and Guillermo Calzadilla was accepted by the Bureau of Educational and Cultural Affairs at the U.S. State Department. Allora and Calzadilla were the first collaborative team to be exhibited at the Venice Biennale, and 2011 was the first time American artists from a Spanish-speaking community were selected. Six new works of art were developed by the pair, who often explore geopolitical themes through their work. The pieces they created for the 2011 U.S. Pavilion formed an exhibition entitled Gloria and highlighted competitive institutions such as the Olympic Games, the military, and international commerce. Allora and Calzadilla also brought bring elements of performance into their multimedia pieces through the participation of Olympic athletes. Three of the six pieces, entitled Body in Flight (Delta), Body in Flight (American), and Track and Field, featured Olympians Dan O'Brien, Chellsie Memmel, and David Durante.

== Festivals and events ==
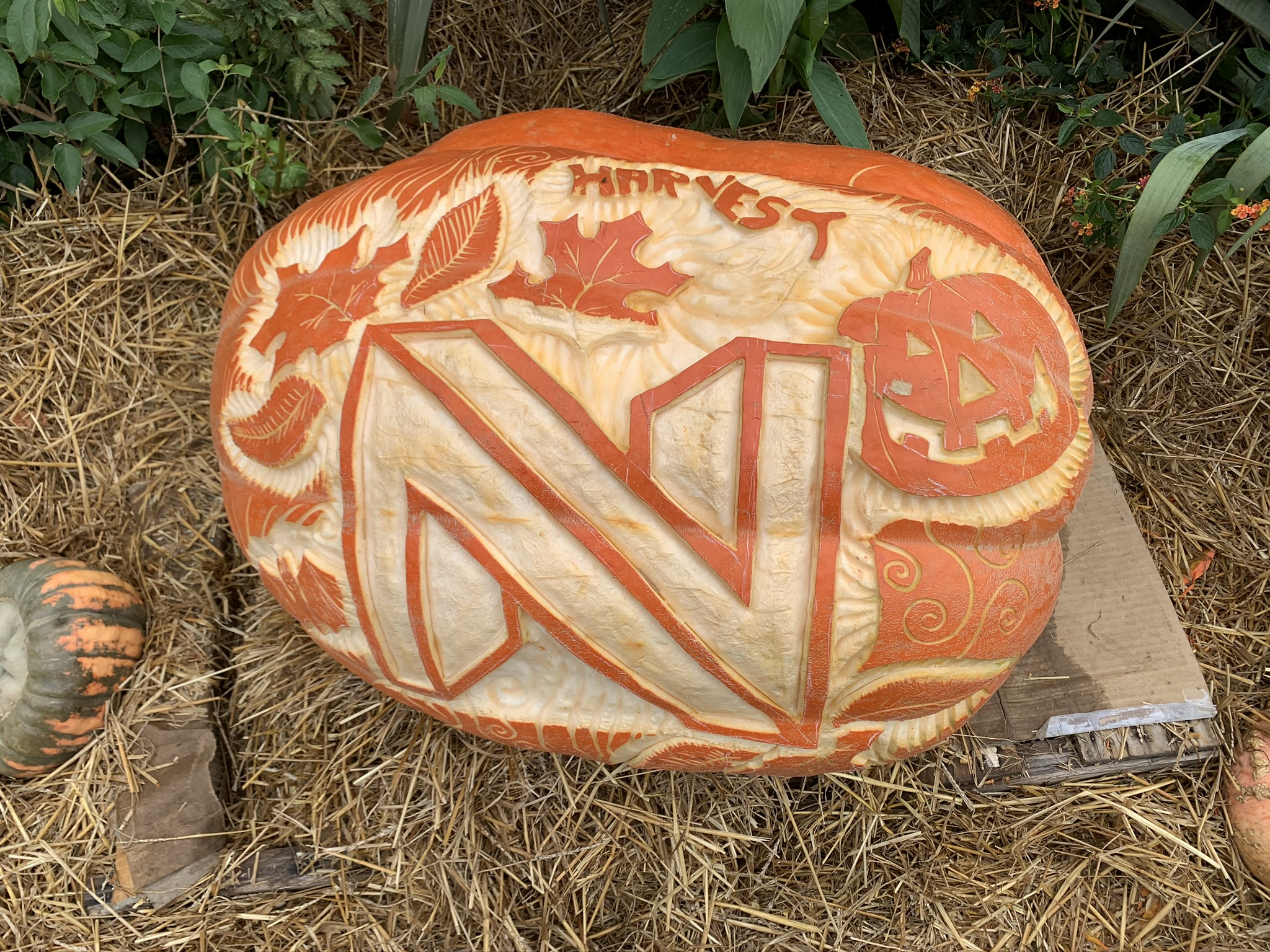
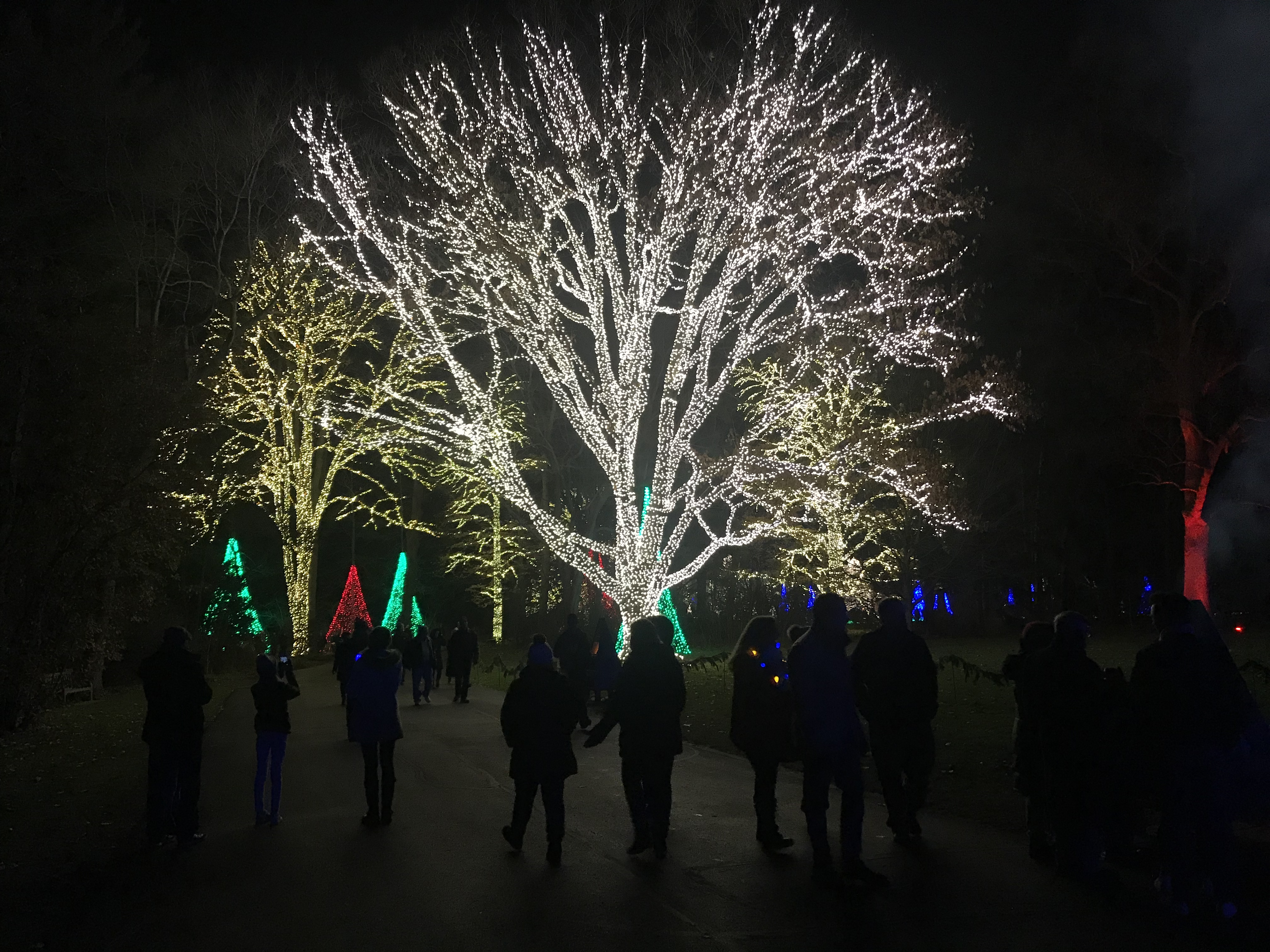
(Left) A carved pumpkin with the Newfields logo during the 2019 Harvest festival and (Right) several lit trees during the 2018 Winterlights festival.

=== Winterlights ===
Winterlights began in 2017, in which 1.2 million Christmas lights were strung across the Newfields campus, as well as a musically coordinated light show. The 2018 and 2019 had increasing number of lights both years, and the festival is now held every year. The festival is a paid event, with a reduced price for members.

=== Harvest Nights ===
In October 2019, an autumn-themed festival was introduced titled "Harvest", which ran for one weekend. The event included an infinity mirror room by Yayoi Kusama titled, "All the Eternal Love I have for the Pumpkin", pumpkin painting, beer and food tents, and a petting zoo. Subsequent editions of the event lasted most of October and included "Harvest Days", which ran during normal museum hours, and "Harvest Nights", which ran in the evenings. Harvest Nights featured a Halloween-themed path of Jack-o-lanterns and sound effects that led to the Lilly House, where a ghost story of the mansion's past was projected onto its facade. Harvest Nights is a paid event, with a reduced price for members, while Harvest Days is included with admission.

=== Penrod Art Fair ===
The all-male Penrod Society was formed in 1967 to boost membership for the Art Association of Indianapolis. The society has hosted an event, now known as the Penrod Art Fair, annually at Newfields since 1968. The first iteration of the event, called "An Afternoon at Oldfields", was a celebration of the recently donated Oldfields land. The event drew more than 4,000 people and included a performance by the Indianapolis Symphony Orchestra. The current Penrod Art Fair, nicknamed "Indiana's Nicest Day", is the United States' largest single-day art fair, and attracted more than 20,000 patrons and 300 artists in 2016. The event did not take place in 2020 due to the COVID-19 pandemic, but returned the following year.

== Conservation ==
The IMA's conservation department was established in 1970 by the museum's first full-time conservator, Paul Spheeris, and quickly became known as a regional center for conservation. In 1978, the department began providing consulting services to regional institutions, taking on contracts from across the Midwest. An early high-profile contract involved the preservation of 45 governors' portraits over the course of 15 months. The 1979 exhibit, Portraits and Painters of the Governors of Indiana, was held at the IMA from January to March before the portraits were placed on permanent display at the Indiana Statehouse. Other major regional projects have included the conservation and restoration of the Thomas Hart Benton murals, first created for the Indiana Hall at the 1933 Chicago World's Fair and now located at Indiana University, the Wishard Memorial Hospital murals, the Otto Stark and Clifton Wheeler murals in Indianapolis Public School 54, and most recently the restoration of the May Wright Sewall Memorial Torches at Herron High School, the former site of the John Herron Art Institute.

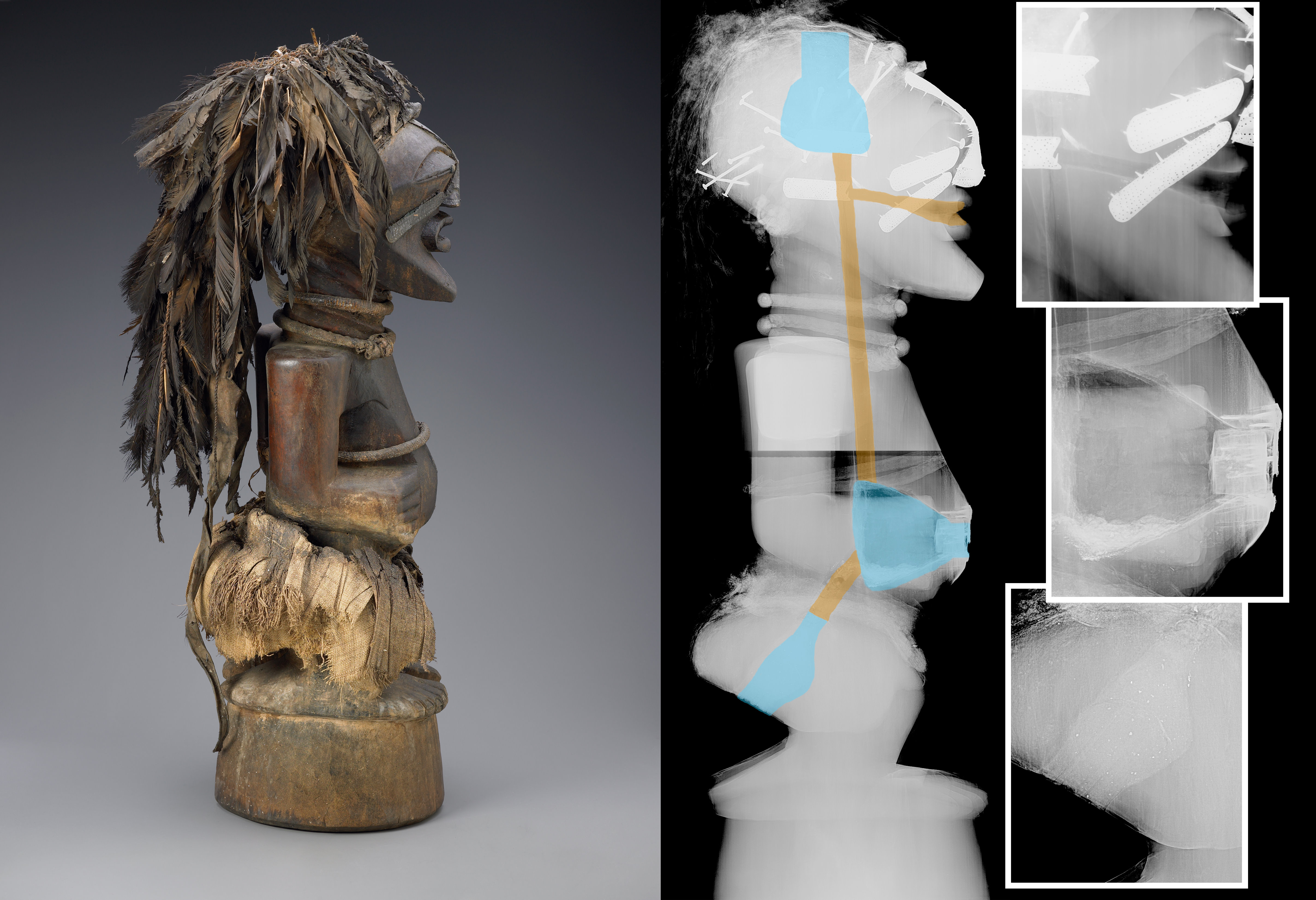
Radiographic image of an African Songye power figure

Currently, the conservation department serves the needs of the museum through the expertise of specialists in paintings, textiles, works on paper, frames, and objects conservation. The department has grown in both size and staff throughout the years, with the most recent expansion occurring in 2007. As of 2007, the IMA owned one of the few computer-based X-ray units in the United States, continuing a trend in X-ray technology that the department began in the 1970s. In 1980, the department helped organize and establish the Midwest Regional Conservation Guild, which includes conservators and conservation scientists from Indiana, Ohio, Illinois, and Michigan. In the mid-1980s, the department received attention when head conservator Martin Radecki assisted local authorities in uncovering over two dozen forged T.C. Steele and William Forsythe paintings worth more than $200,000. The high-profile forgery case led Radecki to organize an exhibit in 1989, Is it Genuine? Steele, Forsythe and Forgery in Indiana. The exhibit highlighted conservation techniques and examined how forgeries can be discovered. Another public presentation of conservation took place in 2007 with Sebastiano Mainardi: The Science of Art, a Star Studio exhibit that allowed visitors to watch conservators as they worked on the 16th-century altarpiece. The IMA's Star Studio is an interactive gallery that enables visitors to learn, through the process of art-making and observation, about the museum's collections.

In February 2010, the IMA shifted from current environmental control standards within their exhibition spaces, allowing temperature and humidity fluctuation of a few degrees on either side of the suggested standard. The IMA relinquished the standard after concluding that the majority of artworks could sustain a greater range of humidity, so permitting the museum to save on the cost of energy bills and reduce its carbon footprint.

=== Conservation science ===
In October 2008, the IMA announced a $2.6 million grant from the Lilly Endowment to be used toward the creation of a state-of-the-art conservation science lab. Through a grant from the Andrew W. Mellon Foundation, Gregory Dale Smith, was hired in October 2009 to lead the lab as its senior conservation scientist. A main focus of the lab is researching the IMA's collection, including couture fashion in the textile collection and objects made of synthetic materials in the design collection. Another focus is scientific research on materials found in the collections, such as resins and dyes on African art pieces and glazes on Asian ceramics. Through the addition of the lab, the IMA aims to establish itself as an internationally recognized conservation center and to increase its potential as a training and professional development resource in conservation science.

== Administration ==
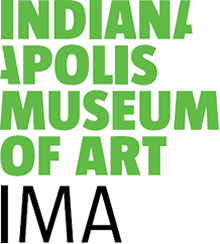
Logo used until 2017.

The Indianapolis Museum of Art is a 501(c)(3) corporation d/b/a Newfields. It is governed by President and CEO Le Monte Booker, three vice chairmen, a treasurer, secretary, and 21 additional board members. The museums endowment consists of approximately 120 individual funds devoted to building operations, bond costs, personnel expenses, legal fees and other purposes. As a consequence of the 2008 financial crisis, the endowment fell from $382 million at the start of 2008 to $293 million at the end of November. The endowment had returned to approximately $350 million by March 2021.

=== Affiliates ===
The IMA has relied on affiliates to support and raise awareness about the museum's collections since the early 20th century.

In 1919, the Friends of American Art was founded to support purchases for the Art Association of Indianapolis and Herron Museum. For two decades the Friends purchased 22 works of art for the collection, funded by members' annual donations. The Alliance of the Indianapolis Museum of Art was founded in 1958 and planned lectures, black tie balls, and related activities in order to raise funds for the museum. Major gifts included a $350,000 contribution in 1979 toward the $40 million centennial endowment campaign and a $500,000 contribution toward the IMA's 1990 expansion. By 2007 the Alliance had provided purchase funds for over 300 works of art.

The Contemporary Art Society (CAS) was formed in 1962 to acquire contemporary art for the museum's permanent collection. In 1963, the first major acquisition consisted of 65 works. In October 2011, IMA Contemporary Art Society partnered with Big Car Collaborative, Indy Film Fest, and the Indianapolis Museum of Contemporary Art to present a screening of Gravity Was Everywhere Back Then, a 2010 film by artist Brent Green.

The Horticultural Society was founded in 1972 to contribute to the care and education of the museum's gardens and grounds, raising $65,000 in 1989 toward the restoration of Oldfields' gardens. In the late 1970s the Second Century Society and the Print and Drawing Society were both formed. The Second Century Society, later known as the IMA Council, was founded to celebrate donations of $1,000 or more to the museum's annual operating fund, attracting more than 200 contributors during its inaugural year. In 1979, the Print and Drawing Society exhibited 70 artworks spanning 500 years in their first exhibit, The Print and Drawing Society Collections. By the late 1980s the museum had expanded its affiliate program to include the Decorative Arts Society, the Asian Arts Society, the Ethnographic Arts Society, and the Fashion Arts Society.

=== Awards ===
After undergoing a sustainability initiative that reduced natural gas consumption by 48 percent and electricity consumption by 19 percent, the IMA became the first fine art museum to be named an Energy Star partner in 2008. As of 2010, the IMA was one of only 11 museums to receive this recognition by the Environmental Protection Agency. The museum instituted a "greening committee" to organize a variety of efforts to maintain environmental stewardship, a primary component of the institution's mission.

In 2009 the IMA was awarded the National Medal for Museum and Library Service, one of 10 institutions to receive this annual distinction by the Institute of Museum and Library Services (IMLS). The IMA was recognized for serving its community through a number of programs, including Viewfinders, a school program that serves 9,000 local students a year. IMLS also cited the IMA's free admission, greening and sustainability initiatives, efforts to reach virtual audiences, and improvements in accessibility throughout the museum.

=== Leadership ===
When the institution was founded in 1883, the leader of the organization was known as the President of the Art Association of Indianapolis. When the Association formed the John Herron Art Institute in 1902, the head of the John Herron Art Museum was given the title of Director. After the whole organization and museum became known as the Indianapolis Museum of Art in 1969, the institution had both a director of the museum alongside a president of the board of trustees. In 1987, the position of chief executive officer (CEO) was created to ease the administrative load of then-director Robert Yassin. Former board of governor's member E. Kirk McKinney served as the first CEO. When Bret Waller joined the museum in 1990, the positions were consolidated. Starting in 2007, Newfield's chief executive was referred to as the Melvin and Bren Simon Director and CEO of the Indianapolis Museum of Art (later "of Newfields") in recognition of a $10 million gift from philanthropists Bren and Melvin Simon to endow the position of the director and CEO. A new position titled the President of Newfields was created in February 2021, whom the Director of the Indianapolis Museum of Art and the also newly created Ruth Lilly Director of The Garden and Fairbanks Park at Newfields both report to.

Sources: (Note: General timelines: Individual term lengths: Albert E. Fletcher: May 1883-September 1883, November 1883-April 1884; Nathaniel A. Hyde: April 1884-April 1894; May Wright Sewall: April 1894-April 1898; Hugh H. Hanna: April 1898-November 1903; India C. Harris: November 1904-1907; William Henry Fox: March 1905-1910; Evans Woollen: 1907-February 1941; Milton Matter: 1911-1912; Frederic Allen Whiting: 1912-1913; Harold Haven Brown: 1913-1921; J. Arthur MacLean: February 1923-June 1926; Anna Hasselman, Grace A. Speer: June 1926-July 1929 (while they were never officially given the title of interim directors, they both "[shared] the duties that most usually fall to a director of an art museum". Hasselman, who held the title "curator of the museum", was later cited by IBJ as the first female director of the museum.); Wilbur D. Peat: July 1929-December 1965; Caroline Marmon Fesler: February 1941-September 1947; Anton Scherrer: September 1947-January 1960; Blanche Stillson: January 1960-June 1960; Roger S. Ashby: June 1960-November 1962; John G. Rauch, Sr.: November 1962-January 1971; Carl J. Weinhardt, Jr.: August 1965-January 1975; Henry F. Deboest: January 1971-December 1973; John R. Benbow: January 1974-September 1977; Robert A. Yassin: January 1975-June 1989 (began as an interim director, permanent starting in June 1975); Clarence W. Long: September 1977-October 1987; E. Kirk McKinney: October 1987-March 1990; Bret Waller: March 1990-December 2001; Anthony Hirschel: December 2001-November 2004; Lawrence O'Connor: November 2004-2006; Maxwell L. Anderson: 2006-2011; Charles L. Venable: 2012-February 2021 (became President in February 2021); Jerry Wise: February 2021-August 2022; Colette Pierce Burnette: August 2022-November 2023; Belinda Tate: November 2023-present; Michael Kubacki: November 2023-October 2024; Le Monte Booker: October 2024-present)

== Outreach ==
=== Admission ===
As early as 1915, the IMA (then the John Herron Art Institute) introduced free admission on Saturdays and Sundays, resulting in an increase in attendance and diversity in audience. In 1941 the museum began a free admission policy that remained in effect until 2006 when the board initiated a $7 admission fee for nonmembers. Beginning in January 2007, the museum returned to free general admission with the exception of special exhibits. Dropping the admission charge, which then director and CEO Max Anderson described as a barrier that kept people away, resulted in increased attendance, membership, and donor support. During Anderson's tenure at the museum attendance more than doubled, to 450,000 visitors annually. In 2009, the IMA was awarded the National Medal for Museum and Library Service for public service, specifically the museum's free admission policy and educational programming.

In April 2015 the IMA returned to charging the public for admittance to the museum at a price of $18 per person for nonmembers. The price was increased to $20 for nonmembers in June 2022, with the price for seniors remaining at $18.

=== Education ===
The IMA's educational initiatives include programming for the local community as well as online audiences. Viewfinders, an art-viewing program that serves 9,000 local students a year, uses Visual Thinking Strategy, an arts-based curriculum that teaches critical thinking, communication skills, and visual literacy. The museum's emphasis on online engagement has led to educational tools such as ArtBabble, a now defunct video portal for art museum content. Davis Lab, located within the museum next to the Pulliam Great Hall, is a space where visitors can virtually browse the museum's collection and experiment with new technology. In addition to its focus on technology and school outreach, the museum provides classes, lectures, and film series, as well as ongoing tours of the collections, historic properties, and grounds. Other programming includes the Star Studio, a space for drop-in art making where visitors, along with museum staff, carry out projects inspired by museum exhibitions.

From 1946 until 1981, the Indianapolis Junior League provided volunteers and monetary support for the museum's docent program. In 1981, the museum began its own docent training program, which continues to serve a large number of volunteer docents through classes and training. As of 2009 over 500 individuals volunteer at the IMA.

=== Accessibility ===
Since the 1990s the IMA has continually improved accessibility for visitors; the initiative was a contributing factor to the museum receiving the National Medal for Museum and Library Service in 2009. The IMA provides captioning on videos produced by the museum, large print binders for exhibits, accessible seating and sign language interpretation in Tobias Theater, and wheelchair-accessible trails in 100 Acres. The museum also maintains partnerships with the Indiana School for the Deaf and the Indiana School for the Blind. In 1993 the IMA opened the Garden for Everyone, a wheelchair-accessible garden designed to emphasize multiple senses. The garden includes varieties of fragrant and textured plants as well as a number of sculptures, including La Hermana del Hombre Boveda by Pablo Serrano.

== Initiatives ==
=== Newfields Lab ===
In February 2010, the IMA announced the launch of IMA Lab, later renamed Newfields Lab, a consulting service within the museum's technology department. IMA Lab was designed to address museum-specific technology needs not currently met by software vendors and to provide consulting services to museums and nonprofit organizations that want to use technology to help solve problems and meet objectives. Newfields Lab projects include TAP, steve.museum, and the IMA Dashboard. TAP is a mobile tour application for iPod Touch that presents visitors with content related to the IMA's collection, such as artist interviews, text and audio files, and pictures. Steve.museum, for which IMA Lab is the technical lead, is a project that explores social tagging as a new way to describe collections and make them more accessible. The Lab also developed a virtual reality experience of the Miller House that allowed guests to "walk through" the house and learn about the architectural and design features.

In November 2021, Newfields Lab, in association with the Institute of Museum and Library Services, the Field Museum, and History Colorado, launched the Museums for Digital Learning. The website is a platform for K-12 educators to use digitized collection resources and resource kits in teaching. The project was initially funded by a two-year pilot project through a National Leadership Grant awarded to Newfields.

=== ArtBabble ===
In 2009 the IMA launched ArtBabble, an online art themed video website that features interviews and full-length documentaries. ArtBabble serves as a repository for art related media content created by not only the IMA but other institutions. The Smithsonian American Art Museum, San Francisco Museum of Modern Art, Los Angeles County Museum of Art, San Diego Museum of Contemporary Art, and the New York Public Library are some of the 30 worldwide partners who contribute content. ArtBabble was a showcase project for the National Summit on Arts Journalism and was chosen "Best Overall" Best of the Web winner at Museums and the Web 2010. The site has since ceased operating.

=== IMA Art Services ===
IMA Art Services is a consulting service focused around public art and modeled after the museum's other consulting arm, Newfields Lab. In January 2011, IMA Art Services signed its first contract with the Indianapolis Airport Authority. With the $100,000, one-year contract, the museum managed the Indianapolis Airport Authority's art collection, which included 40 works currently on display in the passenger terminal of the Indianapolis International Airport.

== See also ==
- List of largest art museums
- List of museums in Indiana
- List of attractions and events in Indianapolis
