= Love sculpture =

Love sculpture may refer to:

- Love (image), a 1965 pop art design by Robert Indiana which he later adapted into sculptures
  - List of Love sculptures, a list of these sculptures
  - Love (Indianapolis), the first of these sculptures, created in 1970
- Love Sculpture, a Welsh blues rock band active from 1966 to 1970
- Love Sculpture, a 2000 album by Carnation (Japanese band)
- L.O.V.E. (Cattelan), a 2010 sculpture by Maurizio Cattelan
- Love (Milov sculpture), a 2015 sculpture by Alexander Milov
