= List of Love sculptures =

Sculptures of Robert Indiana's design

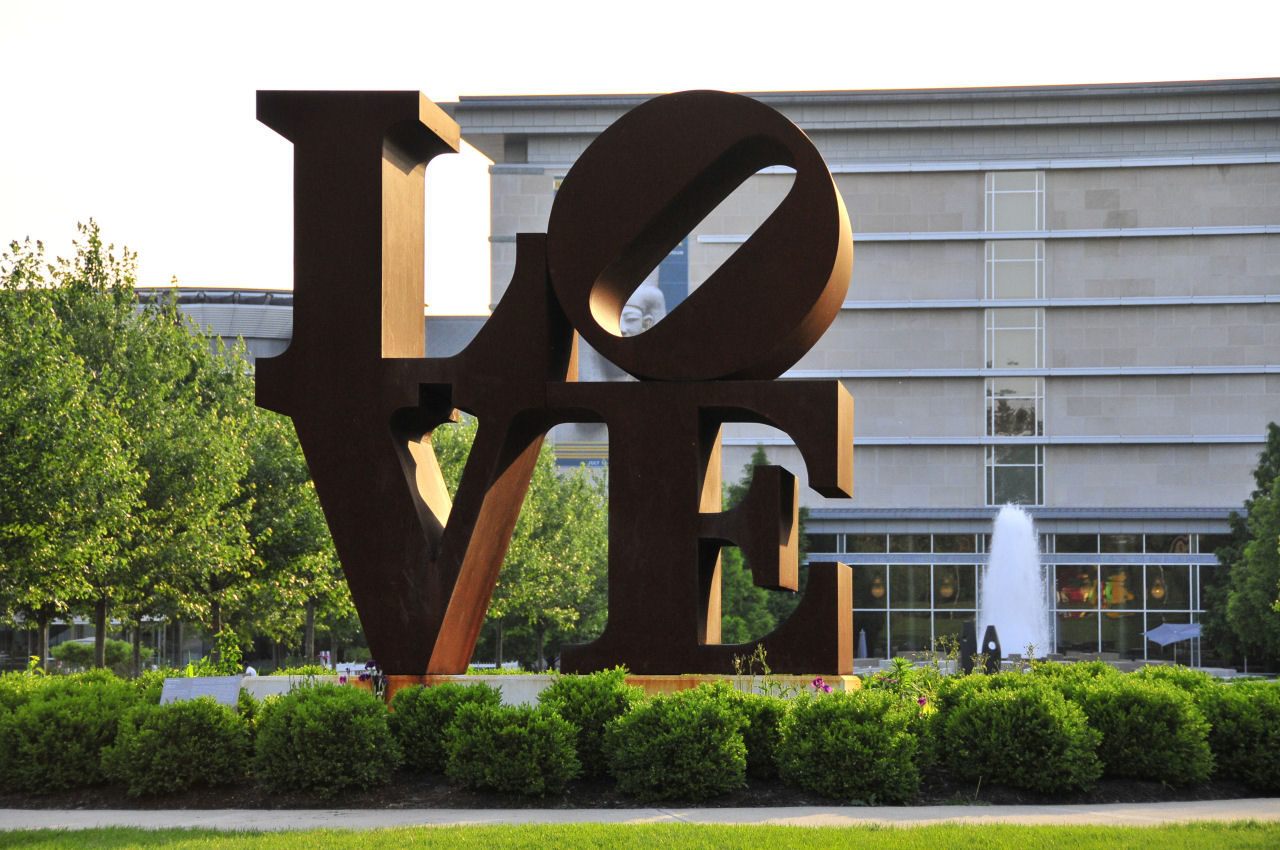
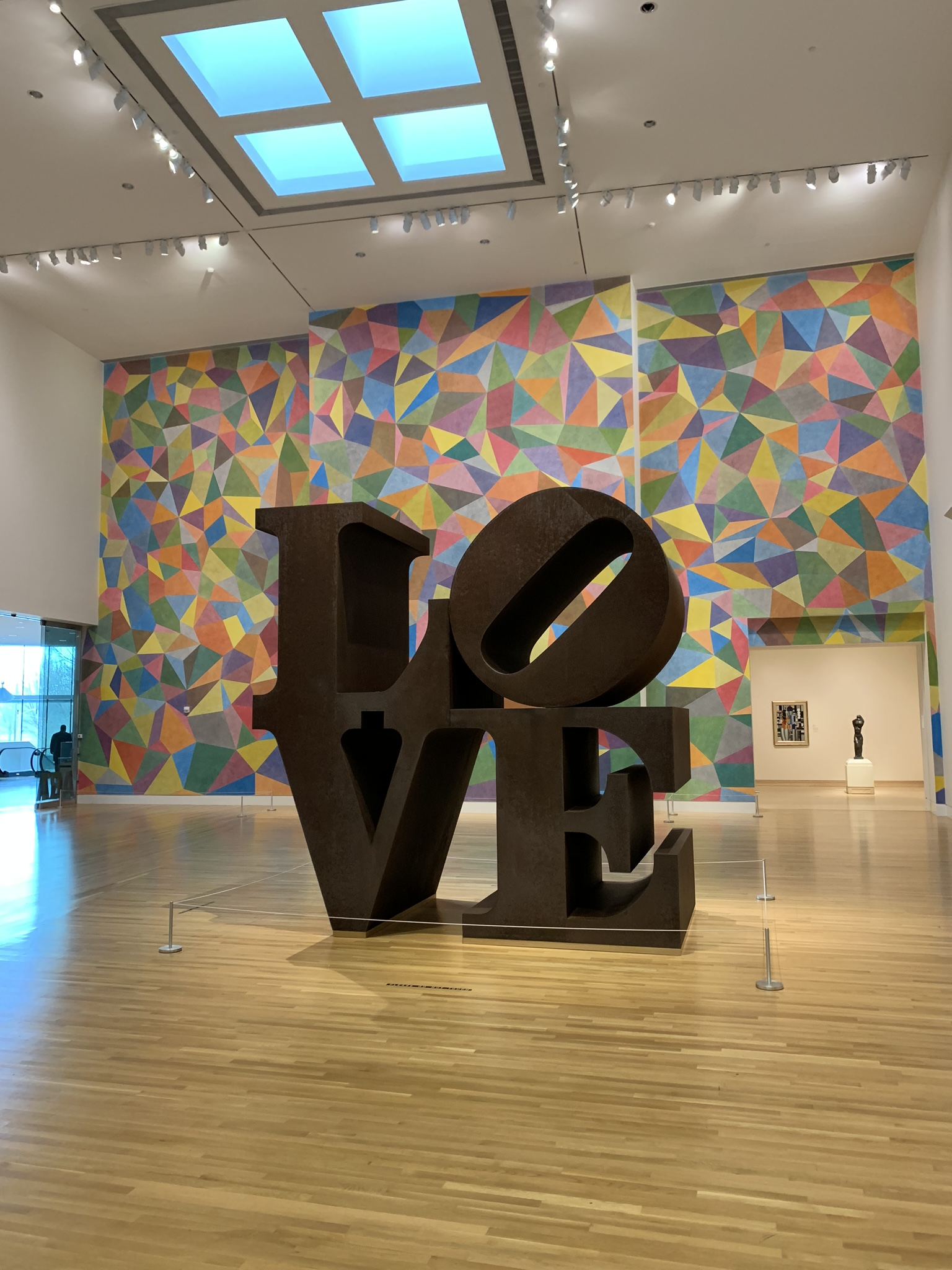
First LOVE sculpture, at Indianapolis Museum of Art, Indianapolis, Indiana, (Left) in its original place outside and (Right) where it is now displayed inside the museum.

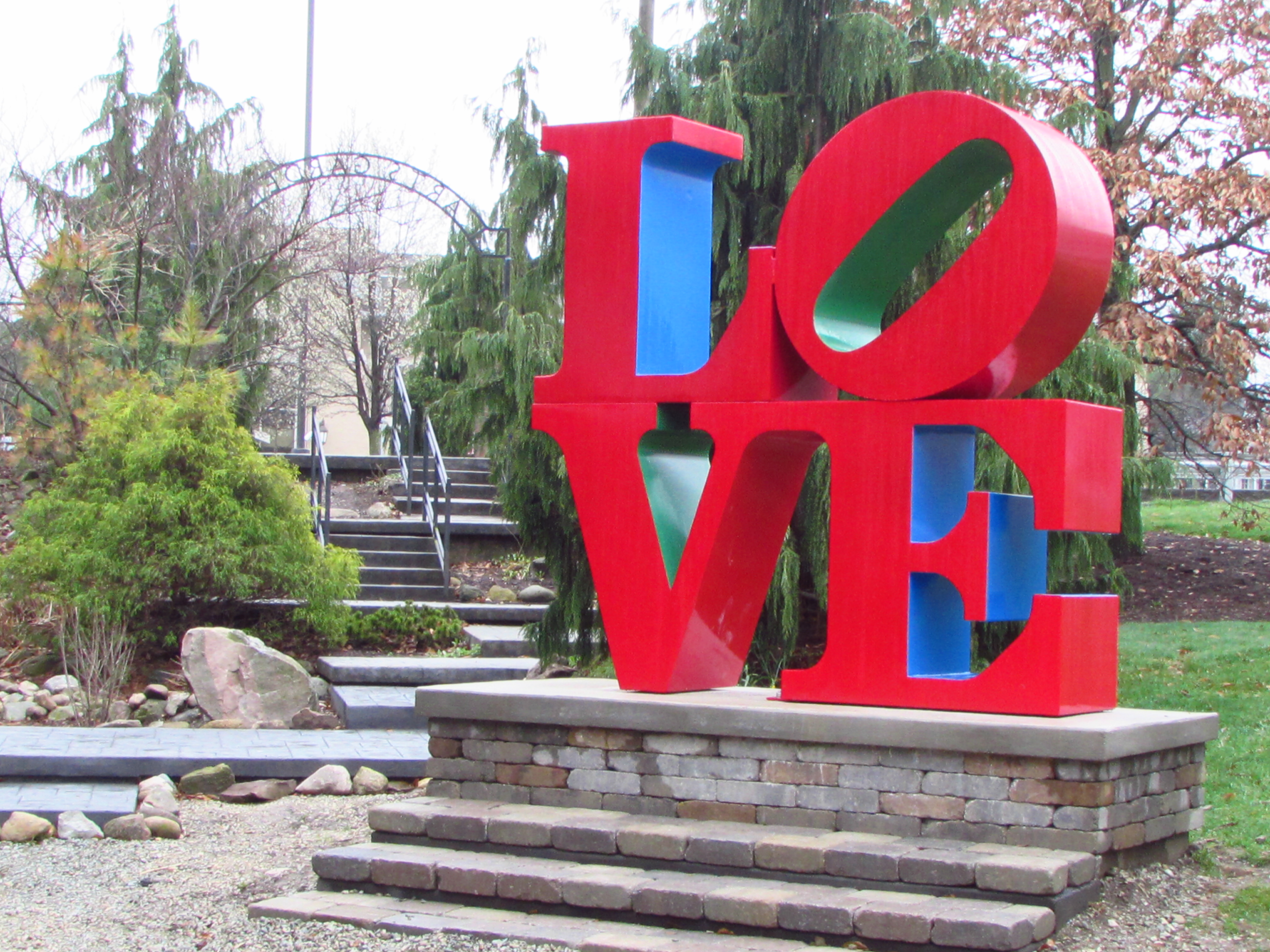
LOVE sculpture Arts Park in New Castle, Indiana

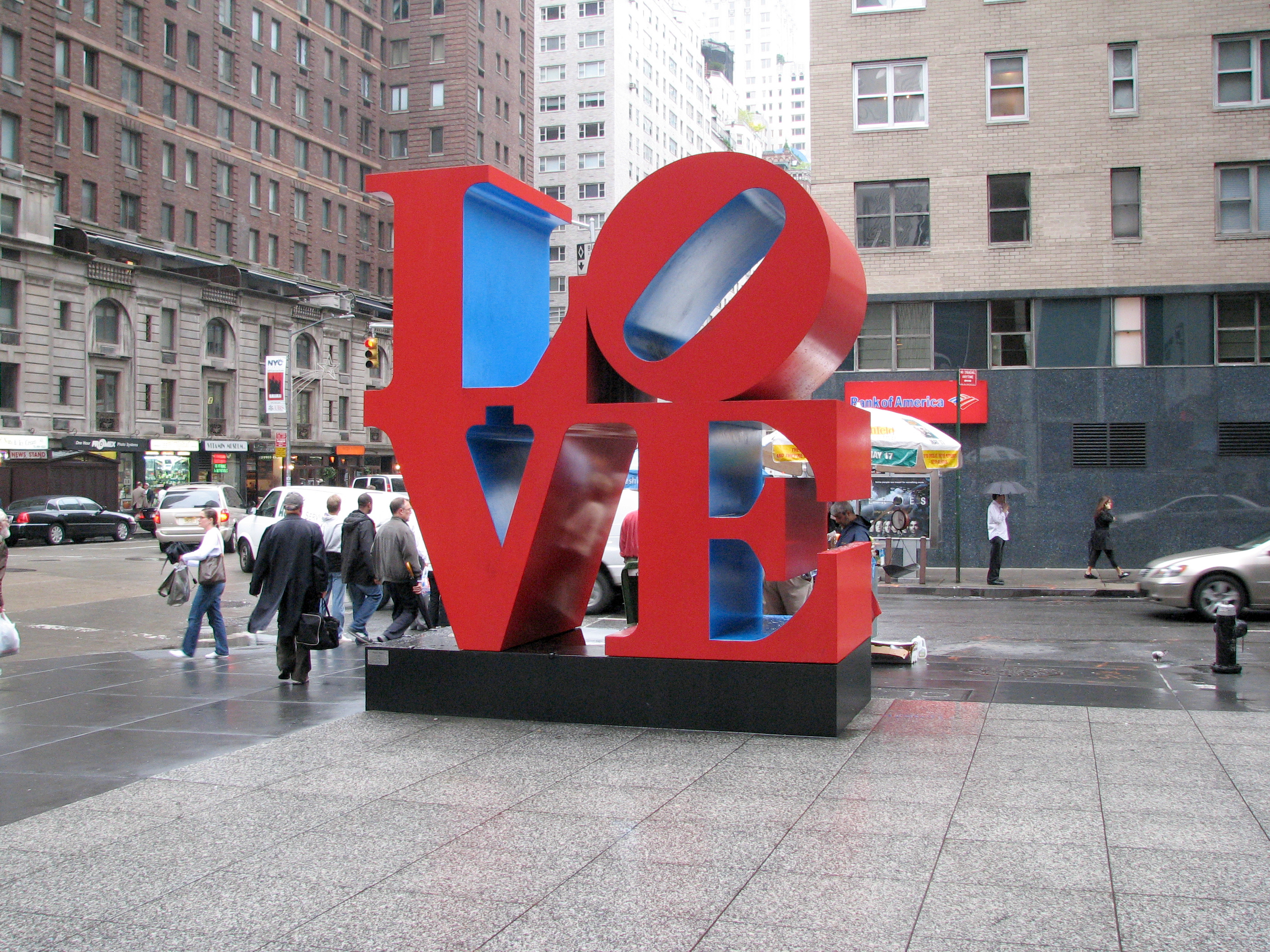
In New York City, New York

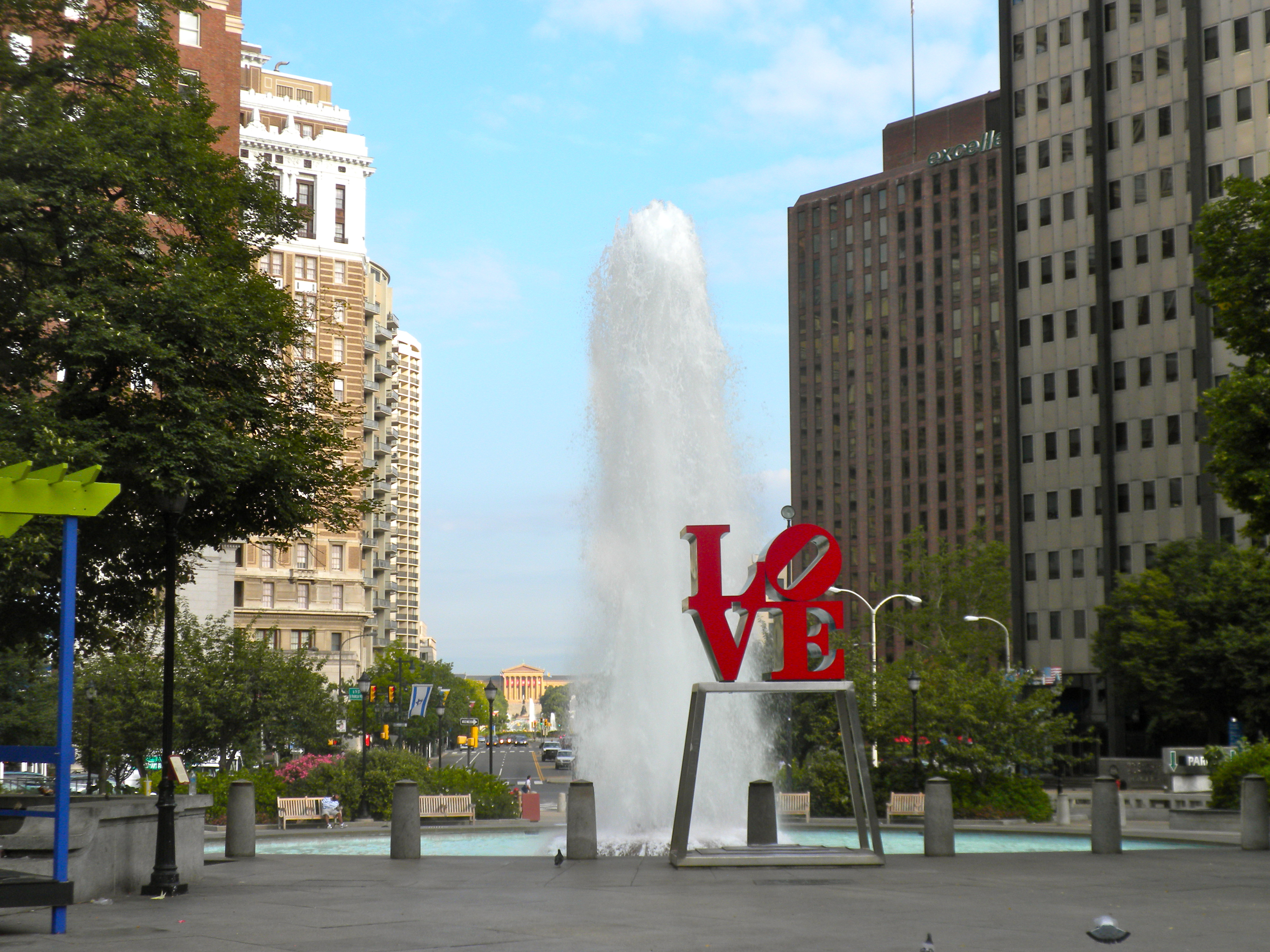
In John F. Kennedy Plaza, Philadelphia with Museum of Art in the far background

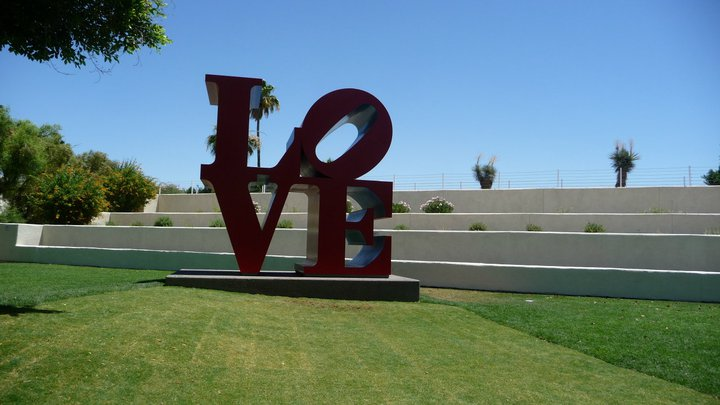
At the Scottsdale, Arizona Civic Center

Robert Indiana's pop art Love design was originally produced as a print for a Museum of Modern Art Christmas card in 1965. The first LOVE sculpture, in Indianapolis, was made in 1970. Since then, it has been released in many different incarnations and sculptural versions now appear in urban centers around the globe. Variants employ the Hebrew, Chinese, Italian and Spanish languages.

== Versions of Love in the United States ==
- AR – Bentonville – Art Trail outside the Crystal Bridges Museum of American Art in Bentonville, Arkansas
- AZ – Scottsdale – Scottsdale Civic Center in Scottsdale, Arizona
- CA – Palos Verdes Estates – Chadwick School campus in Palos Verdes Estates, California
- CA – Rosemead – Panda Restaurant Group in Rosemead, California
- CA – San Francisco – San Francisco Museum of Modern Art in San Francisco, California
- CA – San Francisco – Tennis court behind the abandoned Public Health Service Hospital at the Nike Missile Site SF-89L in San Francisco, California
- CA -- San Marino – A 1966 polychromed aluminum version is installed in the Oak Meadow near the Virginia Steele Scott Galleries of American Art at The Huntington.
- CT – Bristol - Bell City Diner location confirmed April 2021
- D.C. – AMOR in the National Gallery of Art Sculpture Garden in Washington D.C.
- FL - Tampa - The University of Tampa
- FL – Jacksonville - LOVE Sculpture in Hebrew (AHAVA) is on permanent display at Chabad of Jacksonville at the Town Center in Jacksonville, Florida
- FL – South Beach - Outside Kimpton Angler's Hotel confirmed April 2022
- FL – Town of Bay Harbor Islands – In the median of 96th Street in front of a cigar store and medical office in Bay Harbor Islands, Florida
- IA – Des Moines – Pappajohn Sculpture Park in Des Moines, Iowa
- IN – Indianapolis – Indianapolis Museum of Art, Indianapolis, Indiana – The original sculpture version is now inside the museum
- IN – New Castle – in Arts Park by the Art Association of Henry County in New Castle, Indiana (Robert Indiana's hometown) – LOVE sculpture is "likeness" only
- IN – New Castle – corner of Grand Avenue and 15th Street in New Castle, Indiana (Robert Indiana's hometown) – LOVE sculpture is "likeness" only
- KS – Wichita – on Wichita State University campus in Wichita, Kansas just in front of the Ulrich Museum of Art
- LA – New Orleans – New Orleans Museum of Art's sculpture garden in New Orleans, Louisiana
- ME – Rockland – inside Farnsworth Art Museum in Rockland, Maine
- ME – Vinalhaven – in Chinese in front of Indiana's residence, the Star of Hope, on Vinalhaven Island - No longer there
- MI – Grand Rapids – Louis Campau Promenade in Downtown Grand Rapids, Michigan
- MN – Minneapolis – Minneapolis Sculpture Garden in Minneapolis, Minnesota
- NY – Brooklyn – Pratt Institute campus in Brooklyn, New York Visited in 2016, was not on display
- NY – Buffalo – On display, (as of March 2024) in front of the AKG Gallery (Albright-Knox Gallery) at 1285 Elmwood Avenue-
- NY – NYC – Kasmin Gallery displaying three blocks: AHAVA, LOVE, AMOR on top of a building along the High Line at 27th Street and one LOVE block with lights inside the gallery - No longer there
- NY – NYC – Sixth Avenue, on the southeast corner of West 55th Street in New York City, New York Relocated to the Utah Museum of Fine Arts
- OK – Norman – sculpture sits outside in front of the Visitor Center building on the campus of University of Oklahoma in Norman, Oklahoma
- OR – Portland – temporary installation at Lewis & Clark College, adjacent to Howard Hall. Courtesy of the Zarnegin Family Foundation.
- PA – Bethlehem – E.W. Fairchild-Martindale Library, Lehigh University Asa Packer Campus in Bethlehem, Pennsylvania – LOVE sculpture is "likeness" only - No longer there
- PA – Collegeville – sculpture sits in front of Wismer Center on Ursinus College campus in Collegeville, Pennsylvania – the large (comparable to the sculptures in NYC and Indianapolis) LOVE sculpture is a "likeness" only, authorized by Robert Indiana, but not built by him, as confirmed by the assistant curator
- PA – Philadelphia – corner of Love Park (John F. Kennedy Plaza) in Philadelphia, Pennsylvania
- PA – Philadelphia – AMOR sculpture is on the corner of Sister Cities Park (a part of Logan Circle), across from the Catholic Cathedral Basilica of Saints Peter and Paul in Philadelphia, Pennsylvania
- PA – Philadelphia – sculpture sits on a pedestal near 36th Street and Locust Walk on the University of Pennsylvania campus in Philadelphia, Pennsylvania
- TX - The Colony - in front of the Austin Square sign by Saintsbury Drive in The Colony, TX
- TX – San Antonio – McNay Art Museum in San Antonio, Texas
- TX – University Park – sculpture is near a small pond at Williams Park (located on Turtle Creek, east of Preston Road on University Boulevard) in University Park, Texas
- UT – Provo – Brigham Young University Museum of Art in Provo, Utah
- UT - Salt Lake City Utah Museum of Fine Arts in Salt Lake City, Utah
- VT – Middlebury – sculpture is outside the college art museum near a small pond on Middlebury College campus in Middlebury, Vermont
- WI – Milwaukee – installed on the outdoor east patio of the Milwaukee Art Museum facing Lake Michigan, in downtown Milwaukee, Wisconsin

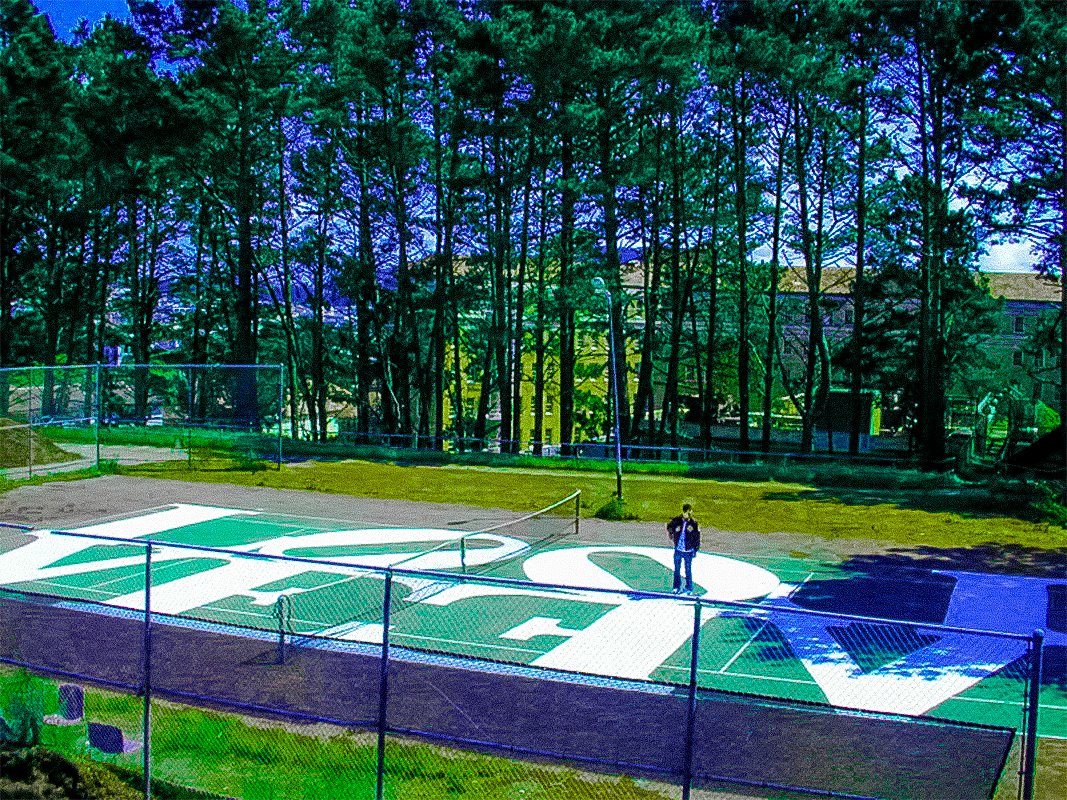
In the Presidio, San Francisco, California.

== Versions of Love in Canada ==
- Hamilton – Ontario – Near "Central Park" development on Rymal Road in Hamilton, Ontario
- Montreal – Quebec – sculpture is encircled by a two-foot tall plexiglass panel – Old Montreal in front of Lhotel 262 Saint Jacques Street West in Montreal, Quebec
- Montreal – Quebec – Galerie LeRoyer 41
- Vancouver – British Columbia – Outside 1445 West Georgia Street in Vancouver, British Columbia – this gallery has closed and the sculpture moved

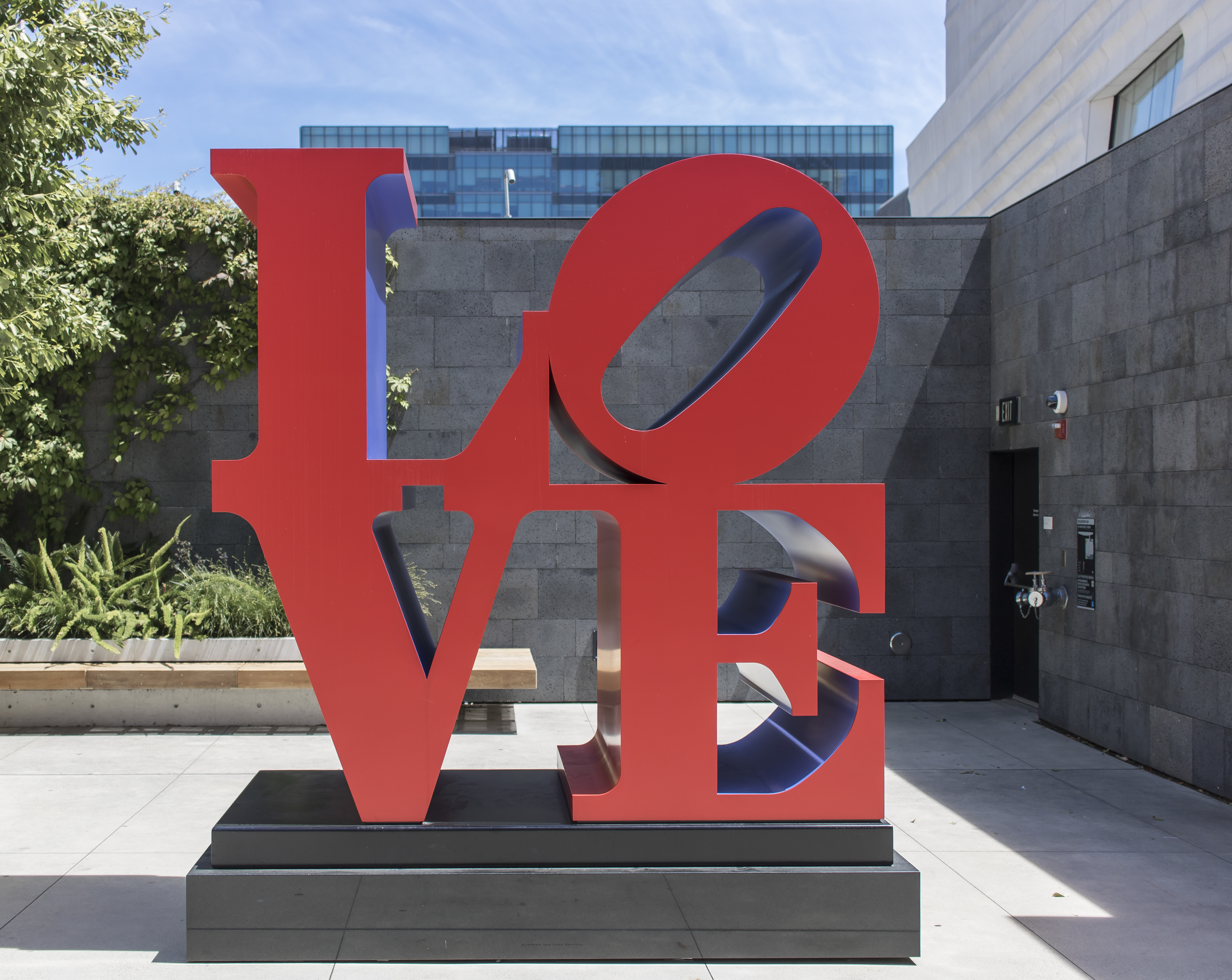
In San Francisco, California

== Versions of Love in Europe ==
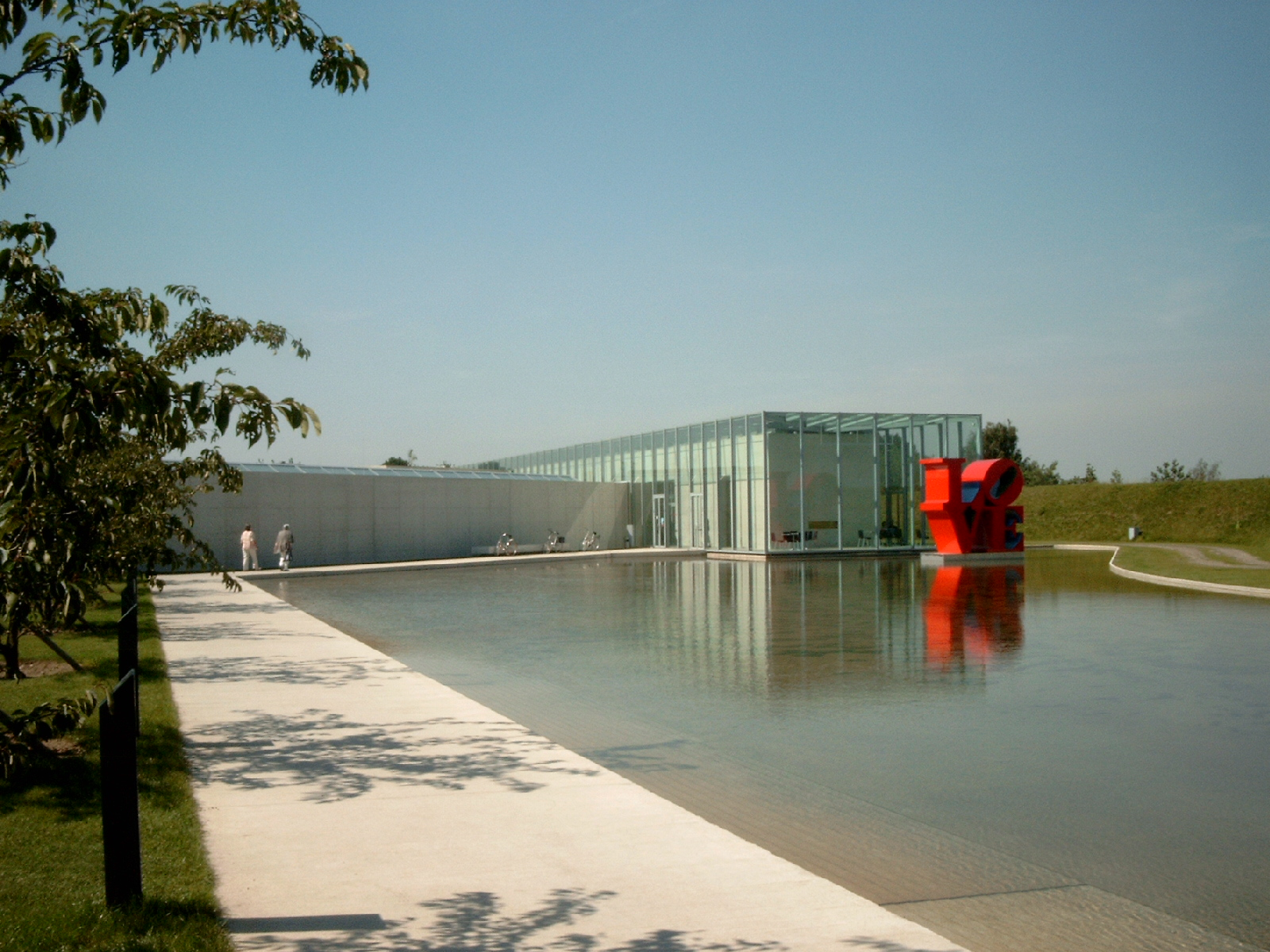
At Langen Foundation in Neuss-Holzheim, Germany

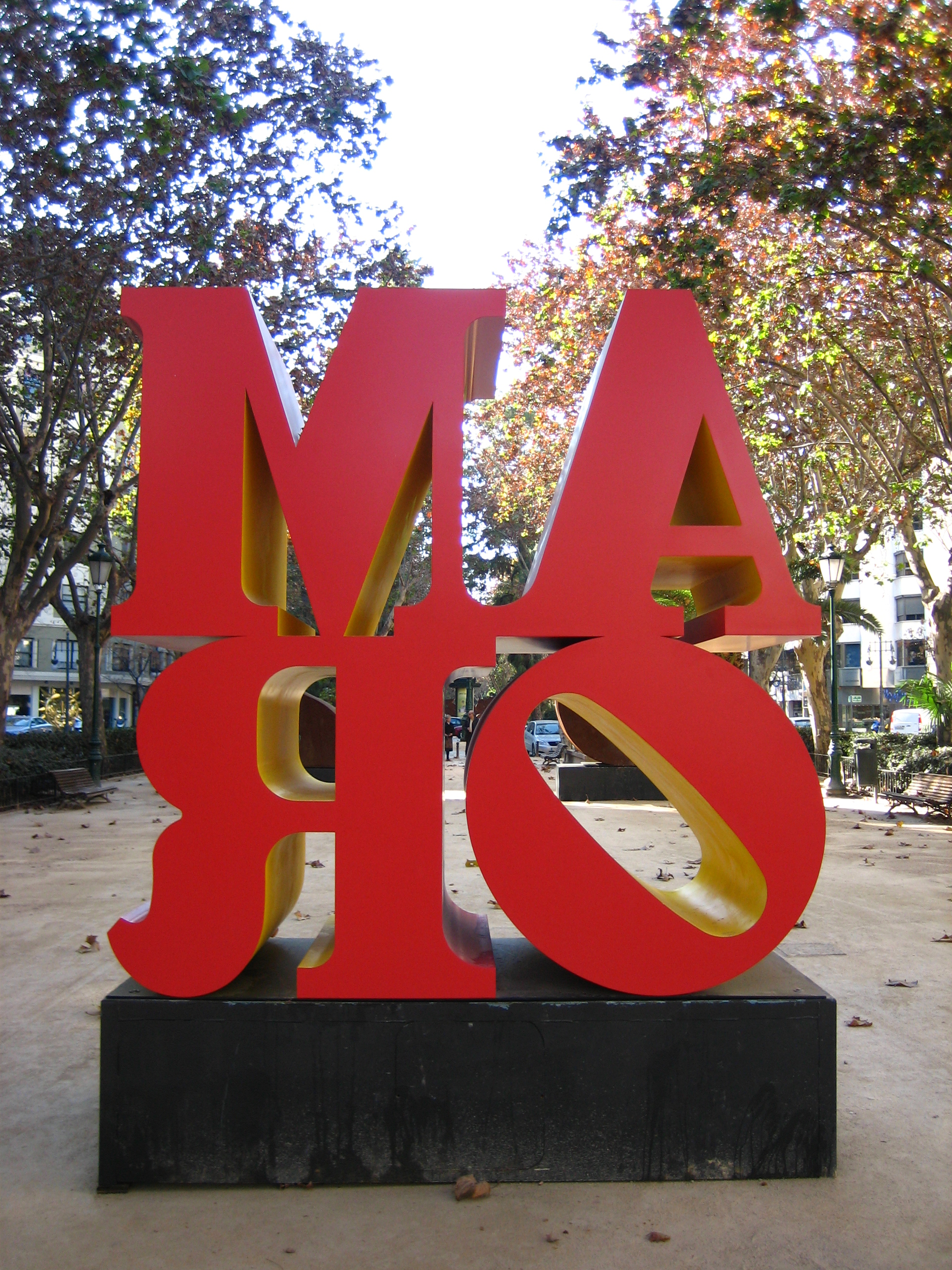
AMOR at exhibition in Valencia, Spain (2007)

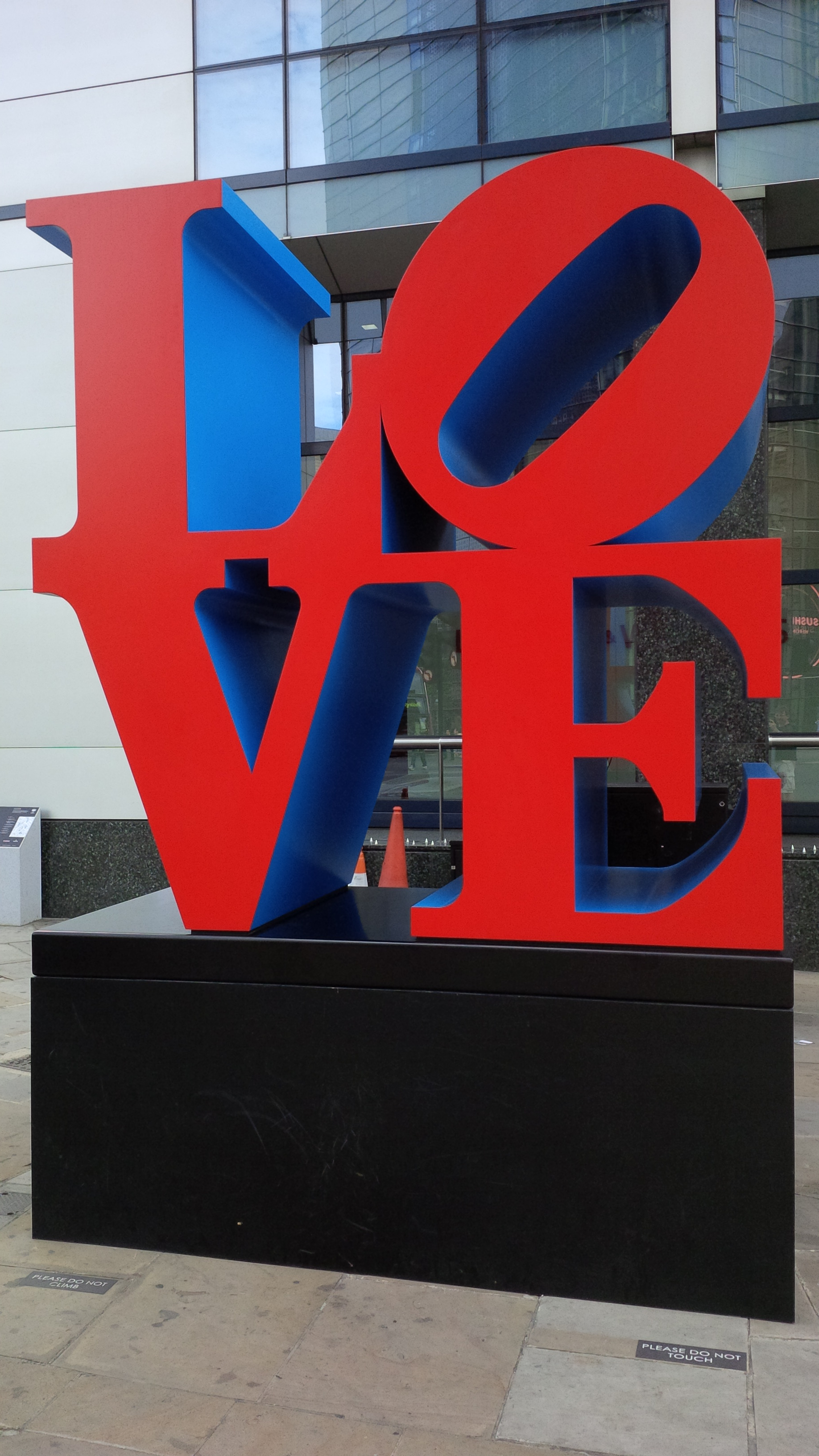
Love in City of London

- Armenia – Yerevan – Yerevan Cascade in Yerevan, Armenia - No Longer There
- England – Derbyshire – Chatsworth in Derbyshire, England, as part of the Sotheby's Beyond Limits exhibition, 2008 - No Longer There
- England – London – Bishopsgate and Wormwood Street, City of London, England (southwest corner) –– temporary exhibit, May 2013 – June 2014 - No Longer There
- England – London – inside Tate Modern Art Gallery
- England - Yorkshire Sculpture Park - West Bretton, UK
- Georgia – Tbilisi – Bidzina Ivanishvili palace in Tbilisi, Georgia
- Germany - Berlin - Neue Nationalgalerie in Berlin, Germany
- Portugal – Lisbon – Rossio Square (Praça do Rossio) in Lisbon, Portugal - No Longer There
- Sicily – Terrasini – La Praiola in Terrasini, Sicily
- Spain – Bilbao – Plaza del Sagrado Corazón in Bilbao, Spain
- Switzerland – Martigny – Fondation Pierre Gianadda in Martigny, Switzerland
- Turkey – Istanbul – Nişantaşı in Istanbul, Turkey

== Versions of Love in Asia ==
- China – Hong Kong – World Trade Centre in Hong Kong, China (taken down)
- China – Shanghai – Zendai Museum of Modern Art in Shanghai, China
- India – Mumbai – Antilia in Mumbai, India (inside the private building; not open to the public)
- Indonesia – Bandung – Love Lock in Bandung City Hall, Bandung, Indonesia
- Indonesia – Jakarta – Gandaria City in Jakarta, Indonesia
- Israel - Jerusalem – Love sculpture in Hebrew is displayed at the Israel Museum
- Japan – Chiba – In a roundabout in Chiba, Chiba, Japan
- Japan – Tokyo – Shinjuku I-Land Tower in Nishi-Shinjuku office district in Tokyo, Japan
- Kyrgyzstan – Bishkek – Love Park in Bishkek, Kyrgyzstan, since July 2009
- Malaysia – Melacca City – In front of Christ Church in Melacca City, Malaysia
- Philippines – Naga City, Camarines Sur – Magsaysay Avenue in Naga, Camarines Sur, Philippines
- Philippines – Naga City, Cebu – Baywalk in Naga, Cebu, Philippines
- Philippines – Quezon City – Eastwood City in Quezon City, Philippines
- Sabah Malaysia – Kota Kinabalu – Sabah Surya in Kota Kinabalu, Sabah Malaysia
- Singapore – Winsland Plaza (between Winsland House I & II) in Singapore
- South Korea – Seoul – LOVE (Blue) in Myeong-dong, Seoul, South Korea
- South Korea – Osan – Amorepacific Corporation factory (indoor) in Osan, South Korea - No Longer there
- South Korea – Yongin – Amorepacific Museum of Art in Yongin, South Korea (LOVE installations on site, playing on the LOVE theme) - No Longer there
- South Korea – Jeju Province – Bonte Museum, on display
- Taiwan – Taipei – Taipei 101 in Taipei, Taiwan (also inside displays Indiana's 1-0)
- Thailand – Bangkok – CentralWorld shopping plaza and complex in Bangkok, Thailand (in the ZEN store; destroyed by the fire during the 2010 Thai political protests)
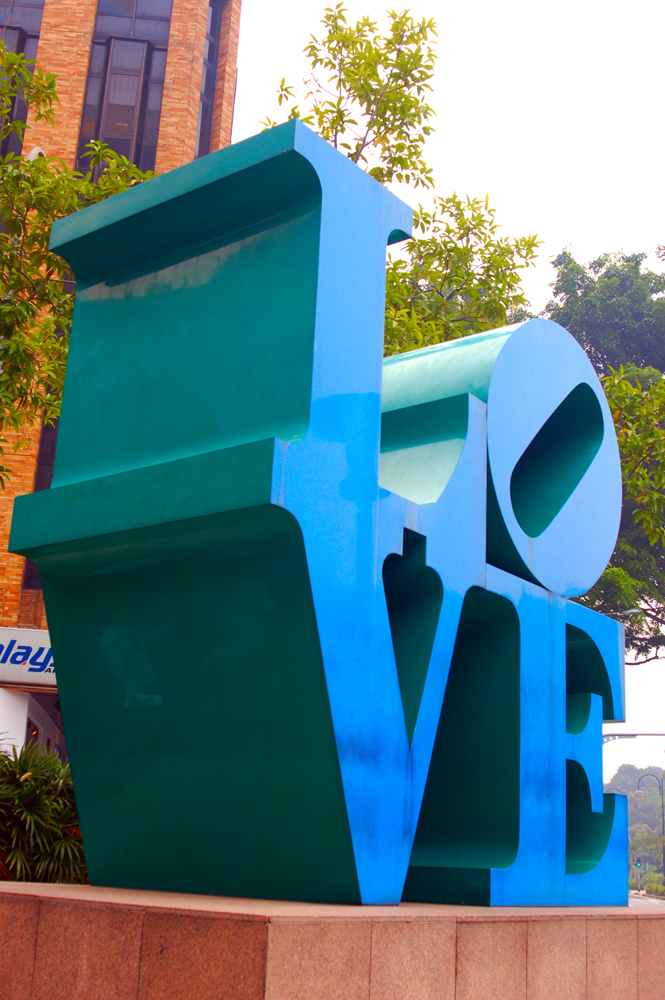
Love in Singapore

== Versions of Love in Latin America ==
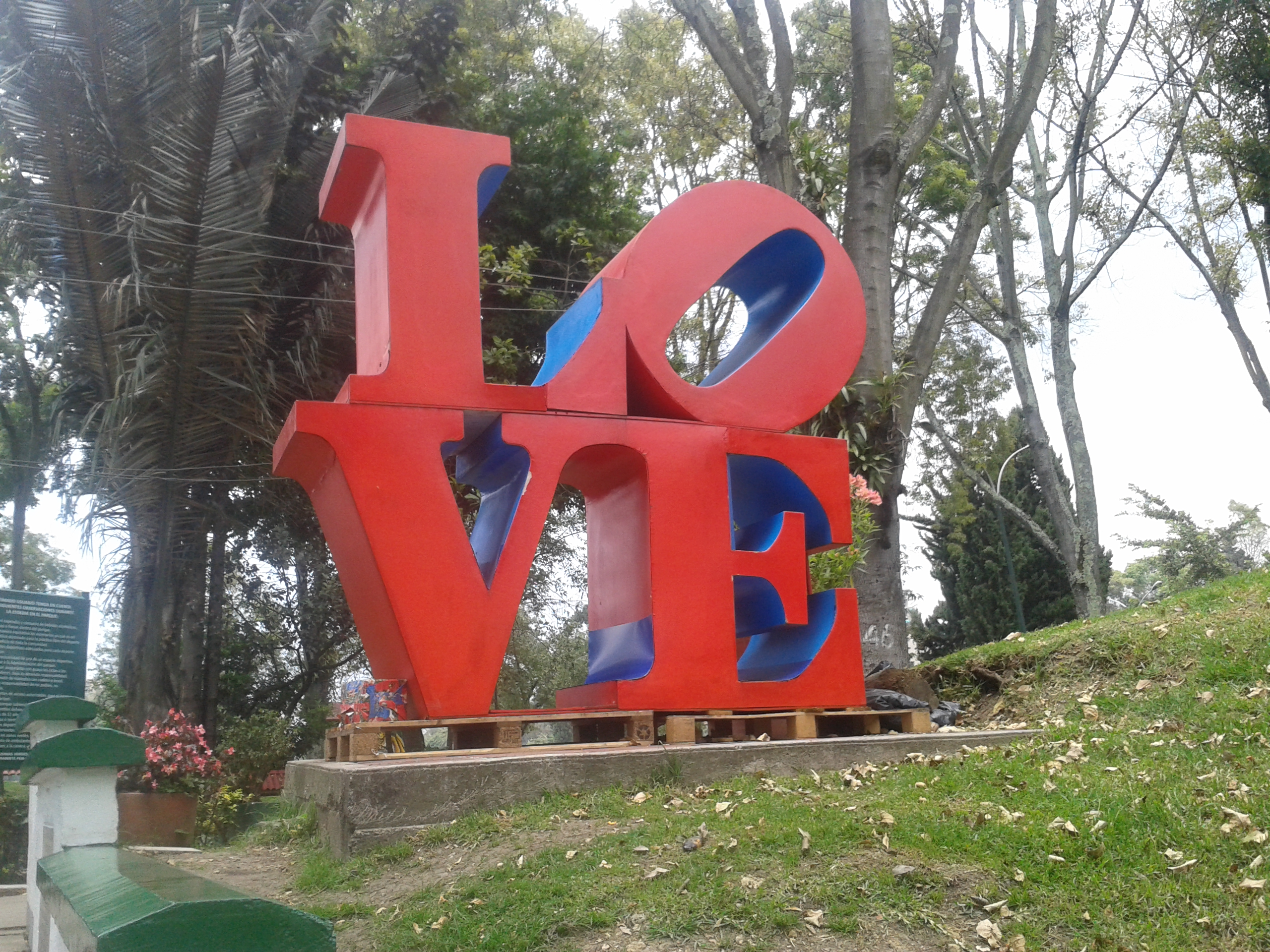
Love sculpture displayed at the Parque metropolitano El Lago in Bogotá, Colombia

- Colombia – Bogotá – Parque metropolitano El Lago in Bogotá, Colombia
- Colombia – Neiva – Neiva, Colombia
- Nicaragua – Granada – Granada, Nicaragua

== Versions of Love in other languages ==
Updated and edited as of 05/20/24

- D.C. – AMOR is displayed at the National Gallery of Art Sculpture Garden in Washington, D.C.
- FL – Jacksonville - LOVE Sculpture in Hebrew (AHAVA) is on permanent display at Chabad of Jacksonville at the Town Center in Jacksonville, Florida
- Italy – Milan – An Indiana sculpture showing the Italian word for love (Italian: amor) was displayed outside the Galleria Vittorio Emanuele II on Piazza della Scala in Milan, Italy. This sculpture is no longer there (visited 12 May 2016)
- Jerusalem – An Indiana sculpture showing the Hebrew word for love (Hebrew: אהבה, ahava) is displayed at the Israel Museum in Jerusalem
- NY – NYC – Kasmin Gallery displaying three blocks: AHAVA, LOVE, AMOR on top of a building along the High Line at 27th Street - No longer there
- PA – Philadelphia – AMOR sculpture is on the corner of Sister Cities Park in Philadelphia, Pennsylvania

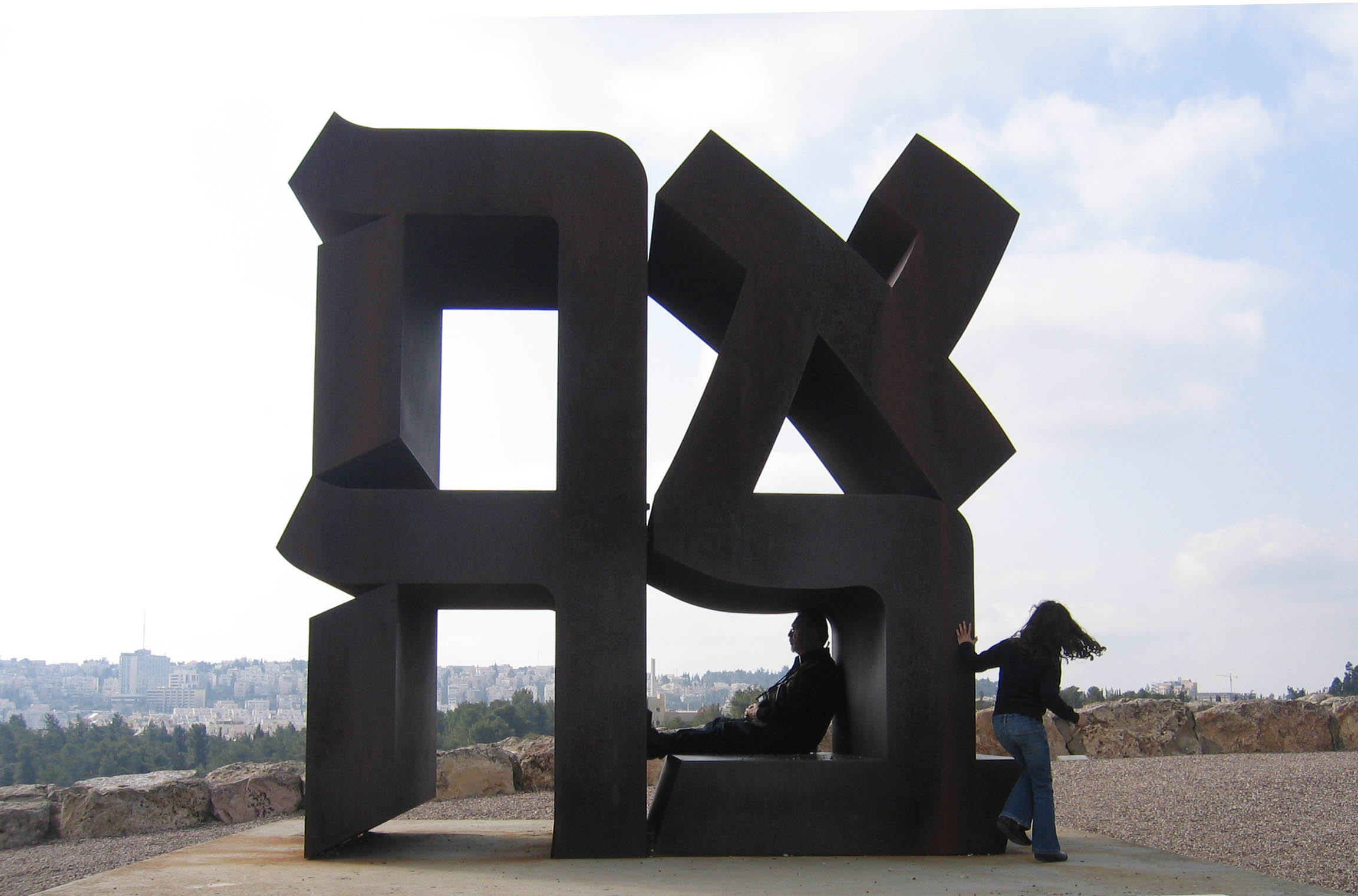
Love sculpture in Hebrew is displayed at the Israel Museum
