= List of museums in Gyeonggi Province =

There are many museums in Gyeonggi Province.

== Museums ==
Museum	Location	Tel.(Country code 082)	Site
The Amore Museum		031-285-7215	https://web.archive.org/web/20140111163435/http://museum.amorepacific.com/
Batangol Art Center		031-774-0745	http://www.batangol.com
Changjo Natural History Museum	Sincheon-dong, Siheung	031-435-1009	https://web.archive.org/web/20051201024526/http://www.cjmuseum.net/
Chunghyeon Museum	Soha 2-dong, Gwangmyeong	02-898-0505	http://www.chunghyeon.org
Dockpojin Educational Museum		031-989-8580	e-mail:dpjkim@hanmail.net
Durumea Museum		031-958-6101 ~2	http://www.durumea.org
Freedon Protection Peace Museum		031-860-2058	http://www.ddc21.net
Gail Art Museum		031-584-4700	https://web.archive.org/web/20140331160546/http://www.gailart.org/
Gimpo tea Etiquette Museum		031-998-1000	https://web.archive.org/web/20120214204814/http://www.yemyung.org/
Gwacheon National Science Museum	Gwacheon		
Gyeonggi Museum of Art	268, Dongsan-ro, Danwon-gu, Ansan		http://gmoma.kr
Gyeonggi Provincial Museum		031-288-5300	http://www.musenet.or.kr
Haegang Ceramics Museum		031-634-2266	http://www.haegang.org
Hanam Museum of History		031-790-6876	http://www.hanammuseum.com
Hankuk Art Museum		031-283-6418	http://www.hartm.com
Hanul Ancient Documents Museum		031-881-6319	https://web.archive.org/web/20090329113759/http://www.han-ul.or.kr/
Hanul Industrial Design Museum		031-881-6319	https://web.archive.org/web/20090329113759/http://www.han-ul.or.kr/
Hanul Medicine Museum		031-881-6319	https://web.archive.org/web/20090329113759/http://www.han-ul.or.kr/
Hanul Old Books Museum		031-881-6319	https://web.archive.org/web/20090329113759/http://www.han-ul.or.kr/
Hanul CameraMuseum		031-881-6319	https://web.archive.org/web/20090329113759/http://www.han-ul.or.kr/
Ho-Am Art Museum	Yongin, Gyeonggi-do	031-320-1811	http://www.hoammuseum.org
Hyundai Ceramic Museum		031-884-0940,0950	http://www.doja.or.kr
Hyundai Kia R&D Museum	Hwaseong		
Icheon City Museum		031-644-8741	
Ie-young Contemporary Art Museum		031-213-8223	https://web.archive.org/web/20161001153325/http://ie-young.org/
Jebiwool Art Museum	Galhyeon-dong, Gwacheon	02-3679-0011	http://www.jebiwool.org
Joseon Royal Kiln Museum		031-797-0623,0614	http://wocef.com
Jukpo Museum		031-881-5905	https://web.archive.org/web/20130728175449/http://www.jnp-art.com/
Korea Camera Museum	Gwacheon	02-874-8743	http://www.kcpm.or.kr
Korea Church History Museum		031-632-1391	https://web.archive.org/web/20140103050015/http://kchmuseum.org/
Korean Deung-Jan Museum		031-334-0797	https://web.archive.org/web/20140410020034/http://www.deungjan.or.kr/
Korean Folk Village Museum	Yongin	031-288-2933	http://www.koreanfolk.co.kr
Land Museum of Korea		031-738-7767	http://www.landmuseum.co.kr
Latin America Cultural Center		031-962-9291	http://www.latina.or.kr
Lighting Museum		031-820-8001	http://www.lighting-museum.com
Mok-A Museum		031-885-9952	http://www.moka.or.kr
Mok-am Museum of Art		031-969-7686	e-mail:kmy0719@kornet.net
Moran Museum of Art		031-594-8001~2	http://www.moranmuseum.org
The Museum of Face		031-765-3522	http://www.visagej.org
Museum of Maga		031-334-0365	http://www.magamuseum.co.kr
National Museum of Modern and Contemporary Art	Makgye-dong, Gwacheon, Gyeonggi-do	02-2188-6000	http://www.moca.go.kr
Oedo Botania		031-717-2200	http://www.oedobotania.com
Samsung Transportation Museum		031-320-9900	http://stm.or.kr
Sejoong Traditional Stone Museum		031-321-7001~4	http://www.stsmuseum.com
Seoul Design Museum	Gumi-dong, Bundang, Seongnam	02-740-1255	http://www.farrang.com/
Shinsegae Coomercial Museum		031-339-1234(240)	http://about.shinsegae.com
Sojeon Museum		031-313-1211	https://web.archive.org/web/20060613223234/http://www.sojeon.or.kr/
Woljeon Museum	Gwango-dong, Icheon	02-732-3777	http://www.iwoljeon.org/
The Woman's Living Museum of Korea		031-882-8100	http://www.womanlife.or.kr
Woo Seok Hoon Natural History Museum		031-572-9555	http://www.geomuseum.org
Youngeun Museum		031-761-0137	http://www.youngeunmuseum.org
Young Jip Bows and Arrows Museum		031-944-6800	http://www.arrow.or.kr

== See also ==
- List of museums in South Korea
- List of museums in Seoul
