= Numbers 1-0 =

- Artist: Robert Indiana
- Year: 1980 – 1983
- Type: Painted aluminum
- Dimensions: 2.4 m × 2.4 m × 1.2 m (8 ft × 8 ft × 4 ft)
- Location: Indianapolis Museum of Art; Indianapolis, Indiana; 39°49′33.83″N 86°11′10.76″W
- Owner: Indianapolis Museum of Art

Numbers 1-0 is a public artwork by the American artist Robert Indiana, located at the Indianapolis Museum of Art (IMA), which is near downtown Indianapolis, Indiana. This series of sculptures is composed of 10 brightly painted numerical digits, each made of aluminum and set on its own base. Their construction took place at the former Lippincott Foundry in North Haven, Connecticut from 1980 to 1983.

== Description ==
These ten objects are fabricated from sheets of cut and rolled aluminum into the forms of Arabic numerals, or “numbers.” Each number is 8' tall, 8' wide, and 4' deep, and weighs between 600 and 1000 lbs. Each number is painted with a two-color scheme: one color for the front and back sides, and then a separate color for the interior and exterior panels. The range of colors includes four shades of blue and red; three shades of green; two shades of orange, yellow, and white; and one shade of purple, grey, and black.

The numerical sequence does not follow a conventional order; the artist has intentionally organized them to symbolize dates of personal importance. Each number is affixed to a customized aluminum base, supported by a central post, and placed on a square concrete block. While all the numbers share a similar overall height and width, their linear designs differ based on the individual shapes of the numbers.

The artist's name, year of production (varies from 1980 to 1983), copyright symbol, and the foundry mark (Lippincott) have been stamped into either the right or left side of each number.

The sculpture's appeal and accessibility spring from the artist's use of everyday material—numbers, rich colors, and the typography of advertising. Though Indiana is best known as a Pop art artist, his color choices—vivid hues and contrasts between different surfaces—and how the numbers are arranged together—staggered, overlapping, nonlinear—reflect his interest in Op-Art.

== Historical information ==
The numbers were conceived as a 1980 drawing made in commemoration of the 20th anniversary of Melvin Simon & Associates (now called Simon Property Group). Indiana accepted the commission to make the drawing specifically because it was attached to the creation of a series of corresponding, three-dimensional sculptures. At the time they were the largest and most important commission of Indiana's career. They were made with the artist's stipulation that they eventually be donated to the IMA.

Indiana's original concept was inspired by a 19th-century print “The Life and age of man, stages of man's life from the cradle to the grave” which was given to Indiana in the 1970s.

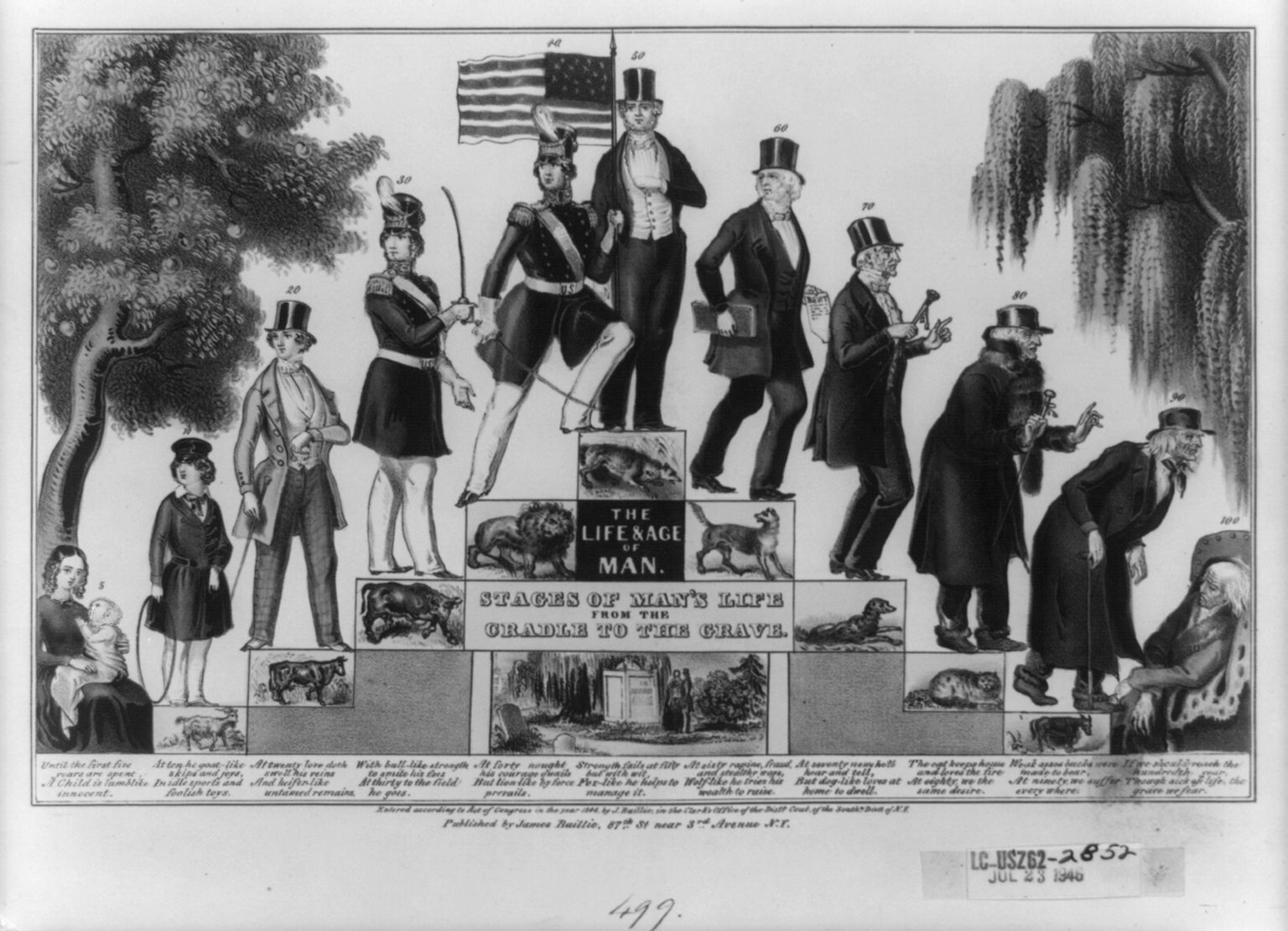
"The Life and Age of Man-Stages of Man's Life, from the Cradle to the Grave," by James Baillie

In the 2002 New York Times preview of several Indiana exhibits that took place in 2003, the numbers and their colors were identified to represent the stages of man in this way:

1, red and green: birth;
2, blue and green: infancy
3, orange and blue: youth
4, red and yellow: adolescence
5, blue and white: pre-prime of life
6, red and green: prime of life
7, blue and orange: early autumn
8, orange and purple: autumn
9, yellow and black: warning
0, shades of gray: death.

Indiana had been working with the 10 numbers two-dimensionally since the late 1950s, but Numbers 1-0 was his first opportunity to realize them in sculptural form. He sees each number as being both an abstract idea and a representation of the physical presence of numbers in life; he associates many significant memories from his own life with numbers.

=== Other versions ===
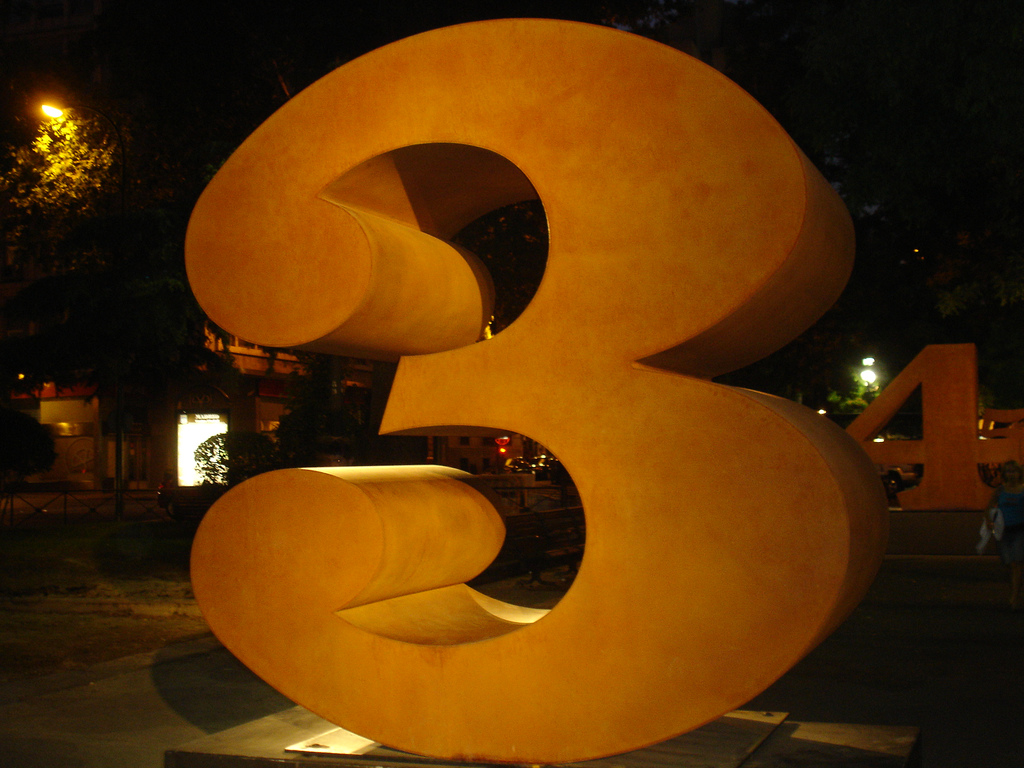
Cor-Ten version of 3 and 4 in Madrid, 2006

Indiana has fabricated at least one other version of the Numbers 1-0 that is similar in both size and color to the IMA set; however, they are slightly smaller than the originals and the colors are slightly different. A set that was fabricated in 1996, were on view in New York City (on Park Avenue between 60th Street and 70th Street) in early 2003.

⅓ scale versions of Numbers 1-0 were on view at the Paul Kasmin gallery as part of his 2008 “Hard Edge” gallery show, which was planned in honor of the artist's 80th birthday ([Planned in honor of the artist's 80th birthday reference]). The colors used for these numbers were similar to, but not exactly like the IMA's or the 1996 versions.

Indiana also fabricated another 8' tall set of the numbers with un-coated Cor-ten steel for his 2006 exhibition in Madrid.

=== Location history ===
Each of the original 10 sculptures was intended to first be displayed at a different Simon Property Group property; in fall 1981, the 1 was on view at the Simon headquarters in Merchants Place, and the 2 was soon to be on view at Two West Washington. It is also known that the 1 and 2 appeared at the Children's Museum in 1982, in honor of director Mildred Compton's 21 years of service. Also in that year the 1, 2, and 3 were used at the awards podium for the 1982 National Sports Festival, which was held in Indianapolis.

Although the entire series was accessioned into the IMA's collection in 1988, only the 6 was put on display at the museum at the time, because of an expansion project taking place. The rest of the numbers were added to the outdoor display in 1992.

In 2005, the IMA building and grounds underwent an extensive renovation, which included rearrangement of the outdoor sculpture collection. The numbers were moved to their second and current location during this time. Indiana designed the presentation of the sculptures, arranging them in pairs of personal significance which he detailed in a 2003 drawing. The series of sculptures is located just east of the IMA's main parking lot, near the intersection of Michigan Road and 38th Street in Indianapolis, Indiana.

=== Acquisition ===
The numbers were acquired by the IMA in 1988 as a gift of Melvin Simon & Associates (now Simon Property Group).

== Artist ==
Robert Indiana (born Robert Clark, September 13, 1928) is an American artist associated with the Pop Art movement.

== Condition ==
The series of sculptures Numbers 1-0 was surveyed in July 1993 as part of the Smithsonian American Art Museum's Inventories of American Painting and Sculpture database, and it was considered to be well maintained. According to the IMA's Blog, Numbers 1-0 is washed annually by the IMA Conservation Department.

== See also ==
- List of Indianapolis Museum of Art artworks
- LOVE sculpture
- LOVE (Indianapolis)
- Save Outdoor Sculpture!
