= Chunghyeon Museum =

Museum in Gyeonggi-do, South Korea

Coordinates: 37.4333°N 126.8783°E

The Chunghyeon Museum is a museum in Gwangmyeong, Gyeonggi-do, South Korea.

== Mission ==
The Chunghyeon Museum aims to preserve and promote Seonbi culture by displaying artifacts that once belonged to Ori Yi Won-ik (1547–1634), a prime minister during the Joseon Dynasty. The museum emphasizes traditional Korean culture, especially the "loyalty and filial piety from Joseon period Confucianism", and conducts educational programs incorporating museum material.

== History ==
The Chunghyeon Museum is a jongga ("house of the head family") museum, in that it enshrines the former residence of a renowned family member. As the practice of ancestral veneration for a family is continued by the eldest son, this jongga "was founded by Dr. Yi Seunggyu, Yi Won-ik's thirteenth-generation eldest son, and his wife, Ham Geumja," who are also the directors and curators.

== Exhibits ==
The museum encompasses an exhibition hall, a shrine, pavilions, and a family cemetery, as well as Yi Won-ik's original house from the late sixteenth century. Items on display include furniture, portraits, writings, and personal items that belonged to or were created by Yi Won-ik.

== See also ==
- List of museums in South Korea
