= Love Park =

Park in Philadelphia, United States

John F. Kennedy Plaza
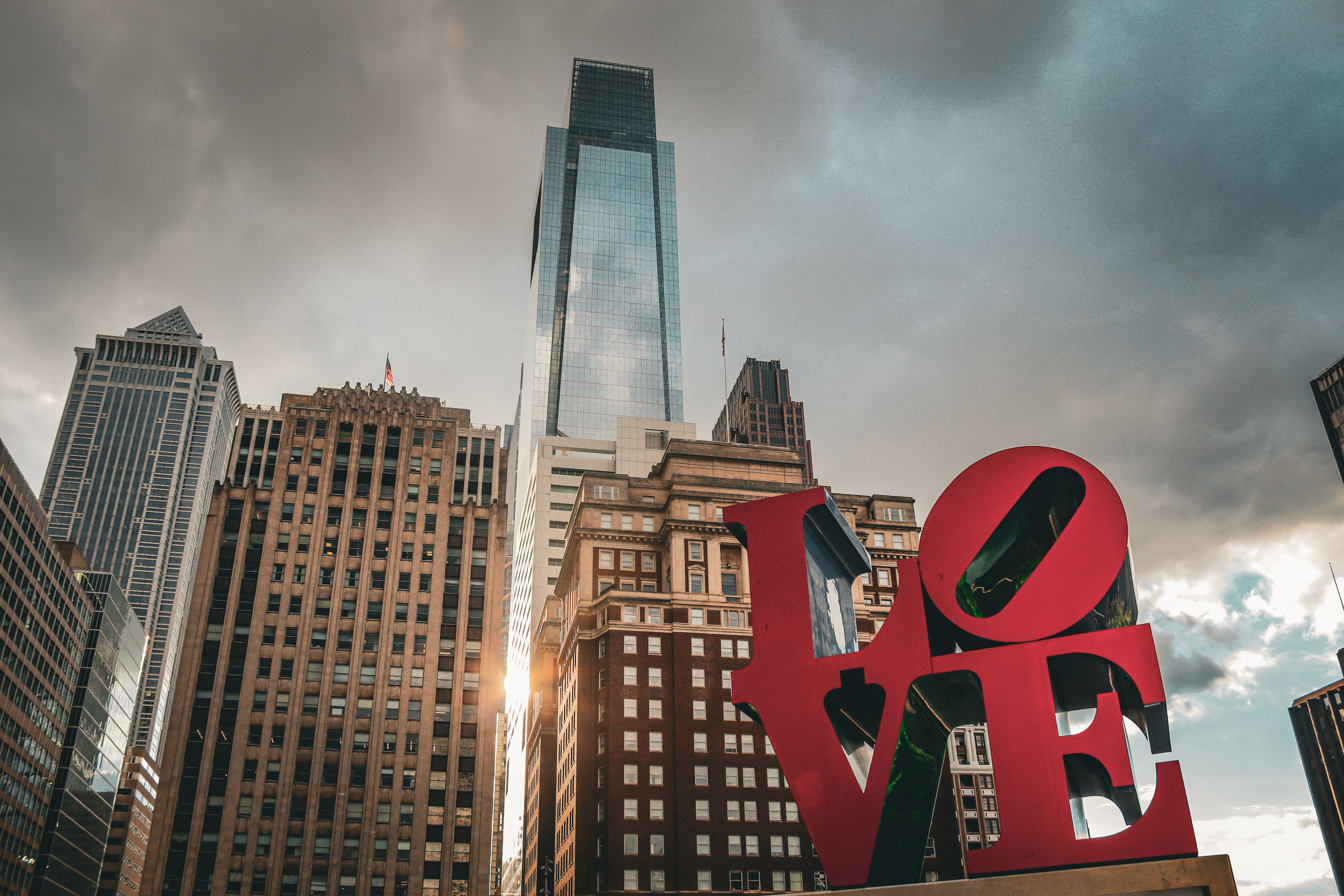
- May 2023 view of the LOVE sculpture.
- Interactive map of John F. Kennedy Plaza
- Type: Urban park
- Location: Philadelphia, Pennsylvania
- Coordinates: 39.9542°N 75.1657°W
- Area: 0.5 acres (0.20 ha)
- Created: 1965
- Operator: Philadelphia Parks & Recreation
- Status: Open

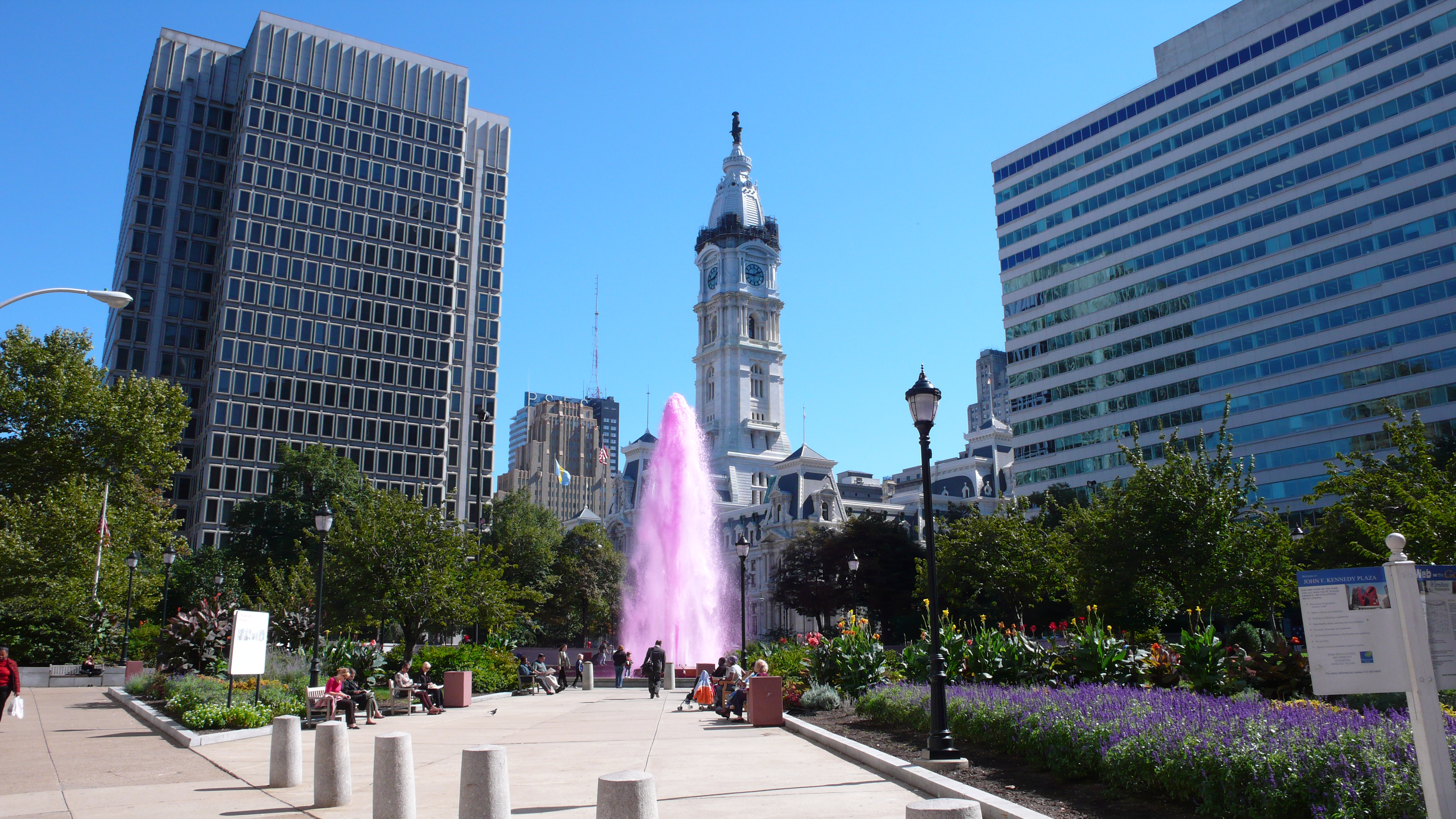
October 2006 view of LOVE Park, with City Hall in the background

Love Park, officially known as John F. Kennedy Plaza since 1967, is a public park located in Center City, Philadelphia, Pennsylvania, United States. The park is across from the Philadelphia City Hall and serves as a visual terminus for the Benjamin Franklin Parkway. The park is nicknamed Love Park for its reproduction of Robert Indiana's 1970 LOVE sculpture which overlooks the plaza, one of three located in Philadelphia.

Despite municipal bans and renovations designed to limit the activity, LOVE Park became one of the most famous and recognizable skateboarding spots in the world in the 1990s and 2000s.

== History ==
Former Philadelphia city planner Edmund Bacon and architect Vincent G. Kling planned and designed the original Love Park. The park was first proposed as part of Bacon’s Cornell architecture thesis in 1932 as a feature of a new city plan for Philadelphia. Once Bacon became Executive Director of the City Planning Commission, the architectural design of the park itself was completed by Kling.

The park was built in 1965 and covered an underground parking garage. The main feature of the plaza became a centrally located single spout fountain added in 1969. The city's visitor center (built in 1960, before LOVE Park) was closed for five years, but re-opened in 2006 as The Fairmount Park Welcome Center. The park was dedicated in 1967 as John F. Kennedy Plaza after President John F. Kennedy.

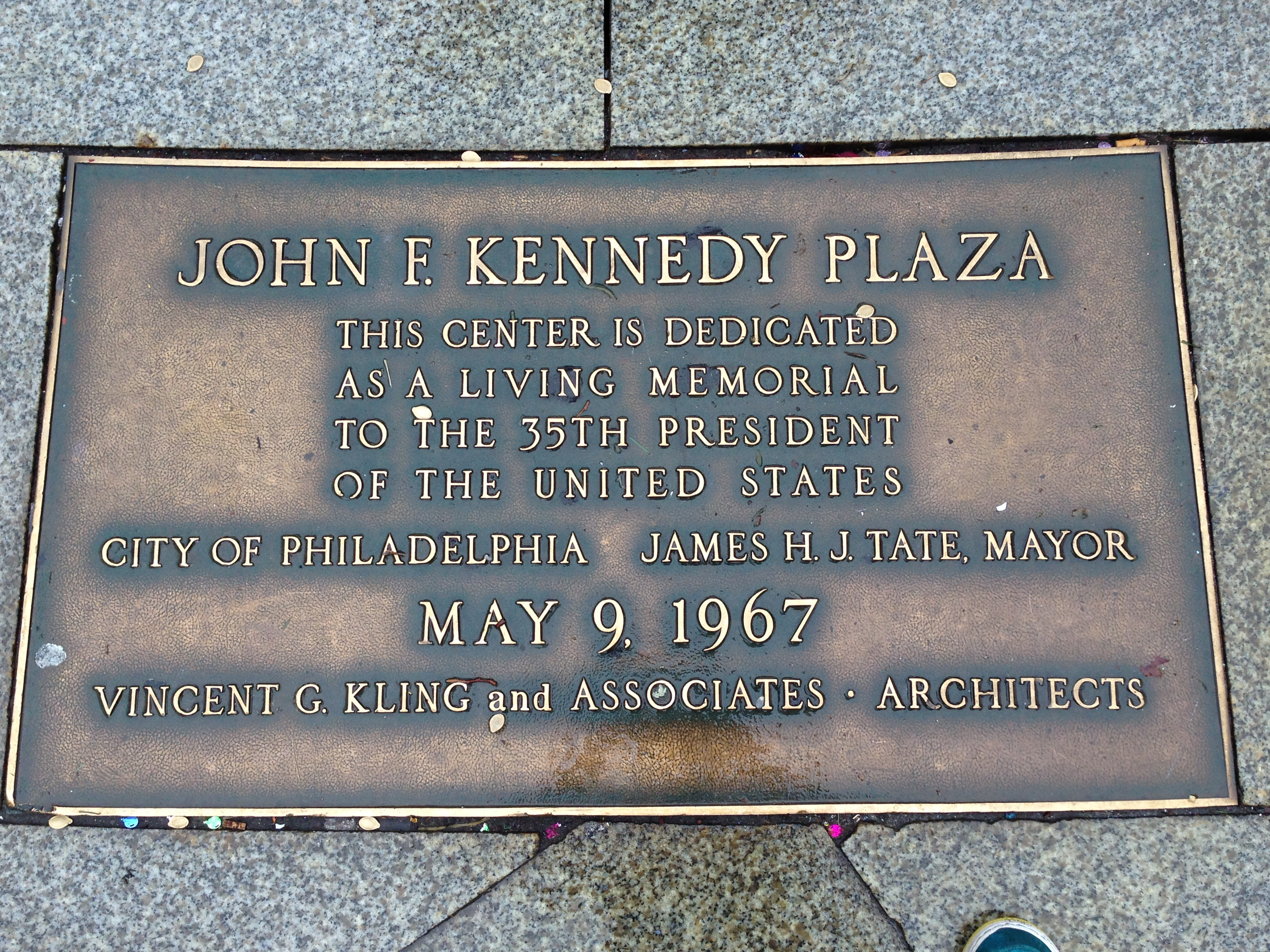
The park was dedicated in 1967 to United States president John F. Kennedy. A plaque at the park describes the dedication.

The LOVE sculpture, designed by Robert Indiana, was first placed in the plaza in 1976 as part of the United States Bicentennial celebration. The sculpture was removed in 1978 after the celebration ended. However, the chairman of Philadelphia Art Commission, Fitz Eugene Dixon Jr., was able to purchase the sculpture and to have it permanently placed it in the plaza during that year.

From 2016 to 2018, a major reconstruction project converted the largely hardscaped plaza into a greener space that contains large and small lawns for casual uses, two gardens and 2 green stormwater basins with tropical and native plantings, an open viewshed of City Hall and the Benjamin Franklin Parkway, new cafe seating, and daily recreational games. A redesigned fountain features a large central jet and a "bird's nest" of smaller jets with programmable up-lighting within a large oval paved area.

== Skateboarding ==
Skateboarders began skating Love Park in the 1980s. The first ban on skateboarding in the park was passed in 1984. In the early 1990s, during the administration of Mayor Ed Rendell, enforcement was ramped up and prioritized, with police giving $300 fines to skateboarders.

Despite the ban, throughout the 1990s skate videos and photographs featuring the park propelled it to becoming one of the most recognizable East Coast skateboarding locations. “Neither Vincent or I had the slightest premonition that our work would become world famous” Bacon said in 2004 regarding the fame skateboarding had brought the park.

In 2000, Love Park was featured as a level in the video game Tony Hawk’s Pro Skater 2.

In 2001, Mayor John F. Street’s administration announced plans to increase the level of policing and enforcement of the ban on skateboarding while simultaneously hosting the X-Games in 2001 and 2002, leading to criticism, protests, and discussion as to whether the city was wrongly wasting an asset by discouraging skateboarding in the park.

In early 2002, the city announced renovations that would intentionally destroy the skateable elements of the park. In October 2002, Bacon skateboarded across the park at age 92 in protest of both the renovations and the bans on skateboarding in an act of civil disobedience.

In 2004, DC Shoes offered to pay the city for the park’s upkeep if skateboarding would be allowed at the park, but the bans and renovations continued.

In February 2016, Mayor Jim Kenney temporarily lifted the ban on skateboarding for five days before the park was completely demolished and rebuilt, removing the iconic Fountain Gap and remaining skateable elements.

In 2024, the city of Malmo, Sweden announced they had acquired the original granite used in the park and were rebuilding a portion of the original design intentionally to attract skateboarders. The park will be open in June of 2024.

== See also ==
- List of parks in Philadelphia
