= Woljeon Museum =

Museum in Gwango-dong

The Woljeon Museum is a museum in Gwango-dong, Icheon, Gyeonggi-do, South Korea.

== See also ==
- List of museums in South Korea
