= Jebiwool Art Museum =

Coordinates: 37.40851°N 126.99590°E

The Jebiwool Art Museum is an art museum in Galhyeon-dong, Gwacheon, Gyeonggi Province, South Korea.

== See also ==
- List of museums in South Korea
