= Korea Camera Museum =

Korean photography museum

Korea Camera Museum is a photography museum in Gwacheon, Gyeonggi-do, South Korea.

== See also ==
- List of museums in South Korea
