= Love (Indianapolis) =

Artwork by Robert Indiana

LOVE
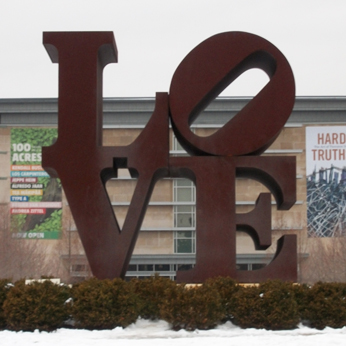
- LOVE in 2011
- Artist: Robert Indiana
- Year: 1970
- Type: Cor-ten steel
- Dimensions: 370 cm × 370 cm × 180 cm (144 in × 144 in × 72 in)
- Location: Indianapolis Museum of Art; Indianapolis, Indiana; 39°49′33.16″N 86°10′59.42″W
- Owner: Indianapolis Museum of Art

LOVE is an artwork by American pop artist Robert Indiana (1928–2018), located at the Indianapolis Museum of Art at Newfields in Indianapolis, Indiana, United States. It was created in 1970 as the first sculptural form of the artist's 1965 LOVE painting and has been on continuous exhibition at the Indianapolis Museum of Art since it was acquired in 1975.

== Description ==
This pop art sculpture consists of three separate elements fabricated from 3/8 inch-thick sheets of Cor-ten steel. They are bolted together to render the two-dimensional text design in three-dimensional form. The hollow but enclosed block letters are 72 inches deep. The largest piece consists of the L stacked on top of the V and fashioned as one unit without a seam between the letters. The O and E are separate elements that attach to the LV. Two posts are installed on the top of the E for the alignment and stability of the O, which has corresponding openings on its lowest surface.

The right upper serif of the E comes into contact with and forms a smooth continuation to the proper left upper serif of the V. The bottommost curve of the O contacts the E in line with the E's inner vertical surface, and it contacts the L at the upper edge of the L's lower left serif.

== Historical information ==
Although the word "love" contained much significance to 1960s culture, Indiana attributes his connection with the word to an earlier, more personal source. Attending Christian Science church services as a child in Indianapolis, he was impressed by a small plaque over the reader's platform bearing the inscription "God Is Love." By 1973, Indiana was no longer a practicing member of the church, but he insisted that the message of LOVE be taken as a spiritual one.

The sculpture is based on the artist's original 1965 Christmas card design for MoMA, in which the majuscule letters of the word “love” are arranged in a 2×2 square, LO atop VE, and the O tilted to align with the diagonal of the square. MoMA's commission for the card came one year after Indiana had designed similar Christmas cards for close friends.

After pirated versions of the design began to appear in excess during the late 1960s, Indiana attempted to copyright his work, but this was rejected on the grounds that a single word cannot be protected. Some art critics believed his switch to the large-scale, three-dimensional version of the artwork was an effort by Indiana to reclaim his design in monumental fashion. Generally, however, the innovation of the letters standing as an independent form is seen as an aesthetic progression from his earlier sculptures which utilized typography painted upon flat surfaces.

=== Other versions ===
The IMA's LOVE is the original sculptural rendition of the design. Many other versions have been made and are displayed worldwide, including editions in Hebrew, Chinese, Italian, and Spanish.

=== Location history ===
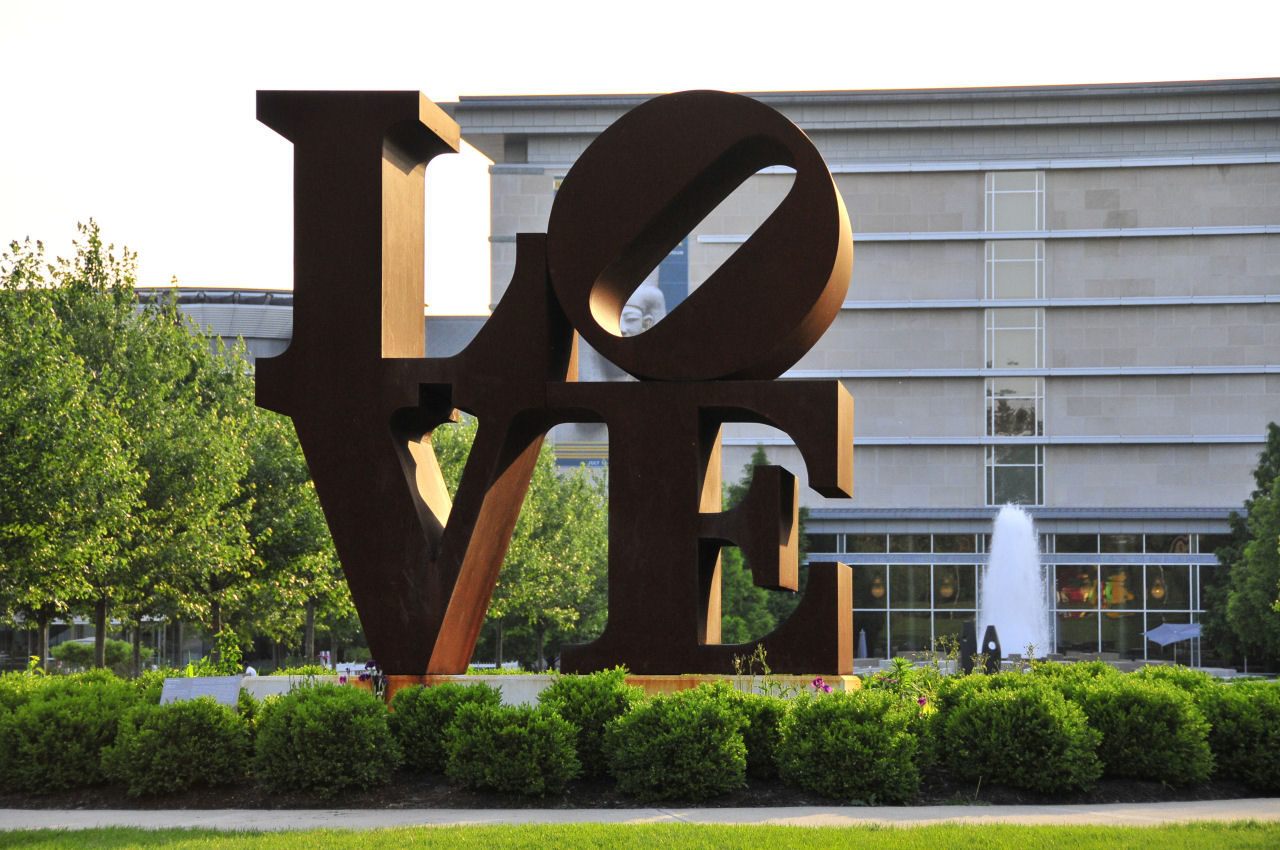
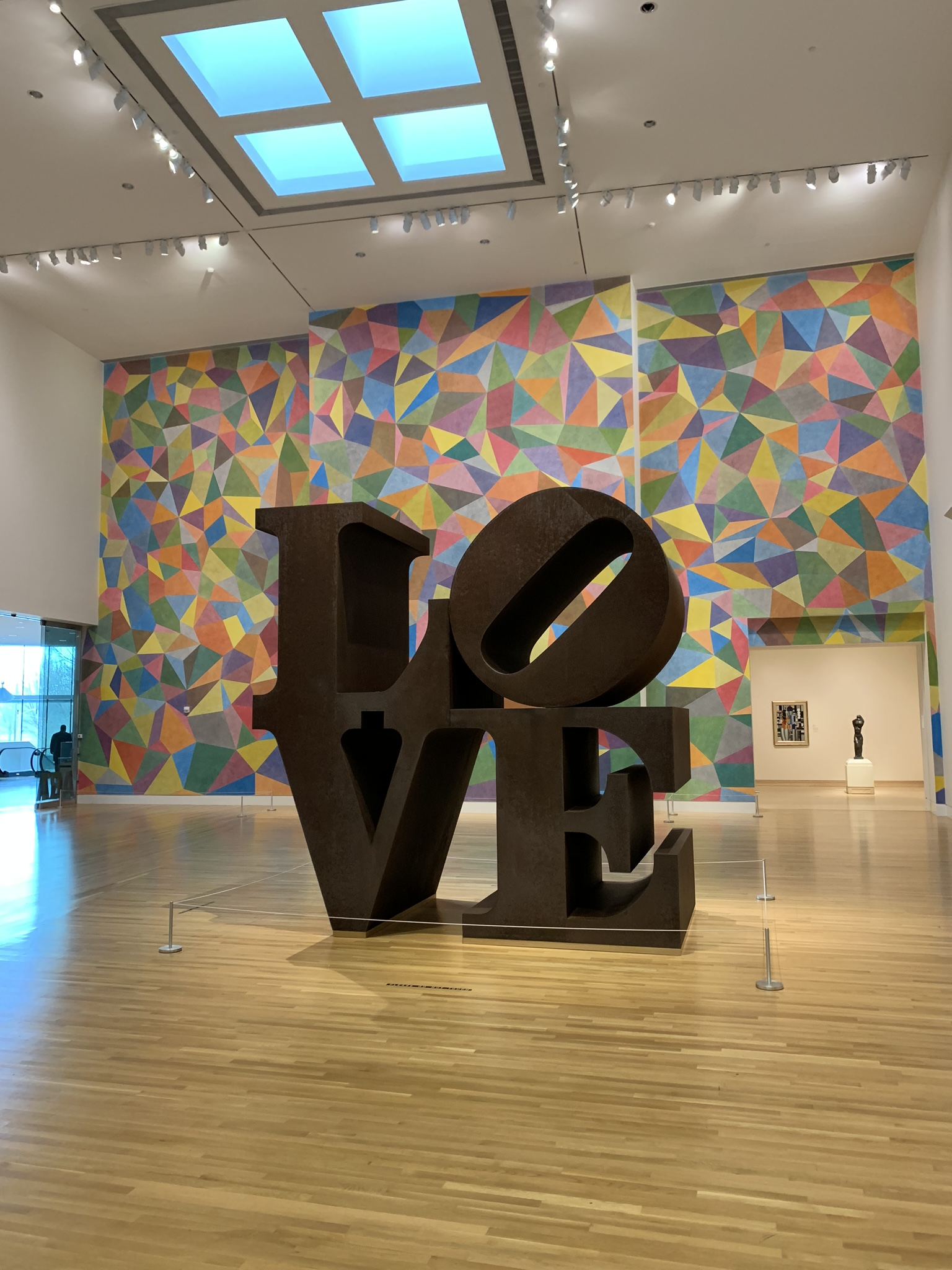
The statue at the Indianapolis Museum of Art, Indianapolis, Indiana, (Left) in its original place outside and (Right) where it is now displayed inside the museum.

LOVE was executed in North Haven, Connecticut, in 1970 by Lippincott, Inc., a fabricator of large-scale sculpture. After its move to Indianapolis, the sculpture was originally installed on the main plaza at the Indianapolis Museum of Art in 1970 for the opening of the museum's current building. It then spent nearly a year displayed on the city hall plaza in Boston before being loaned to New York City, where it was exhibited in Central Park for the 1971 holiday season.

Upon the artwork's return to Indianapolis in 1972, it was showcased for several months in front of the Indiana National Bank building and later appeared for a short time on the mall behind Eli Lilly and Company's administration building. The purpose of the latter instance was to use the sculpture as a backdrop for a TV commercial promoting the Lilly company; the ad intended to draw an analogy between the creativity of art and the creativity involved in research.

LOVE has undergone a few location adjustments as the IMA building and grounds have developed over the years. In 2005, after a major museum expansion, the sculpture was restored and temporarily placed in the museum's Pulliam Court before it was moved outdoors to the main sculpture courtyard, where it is surrounded by decorative landscaping and faced Numbers 1-0, another Indiana sculpture.

=== Acquisition ===
The sculpture was officially accessioned into the IMA's collection in 1975 through a "Gift of the Friends of the Indianapolis Museum of Art in memory of Henry F. DeBoest."

== Condition ==
As an outdoor sculpture made of a weathering iron alloy, the surface of LOVE should naturally carry an even layer of iron(III) oxide, which provides distinctive coloration and also protects the metal underneath from further corrosion. The price of being a cultural icon, however, has continuously disrupted the formation of this layer; viewers have enjoyed climbing the artwork since its first public appearances, apparent through photography and damage to the appearance of LOVE. Indiana acknowledged the inevitable appeal of his sculpture as a site of exploration for children, couples, and passerby. In a 1973 interview with Indianapolis magazine, he wished only "that people would take their shoes off first."

Various conservation efforts to reduce the amount of direct patron contact and its effects, as well as to deal with moisture within the hollow letters have taken place throughout the sculpture's lifespan. The Smithsonian American Art Museum's Inventories of American Painting and Sculpture surveyed LOVE in July 1993, and the sculpture was deemed to be well-maintained.

In 2006 the sculpture was blasted with an inert medium (aluminum oxide) to strip away uneven surface corrosion; it was then re-installed outside on an indefinite basis to produce a new patina through natural weathering. The intention is to recreate the original "crispy," purplish, and iridescent surface. The restorative work done on LOVE was made possible by donations from Patricia J. and James E. LaCrosse.

== See also ==
- Love sculpture
- Numbers 1-0
- List of Indianapolis Museum of Art artworks
- Save Outdoor Sculpture!
