= Love (image) =

Pop art image by Robert Indiana

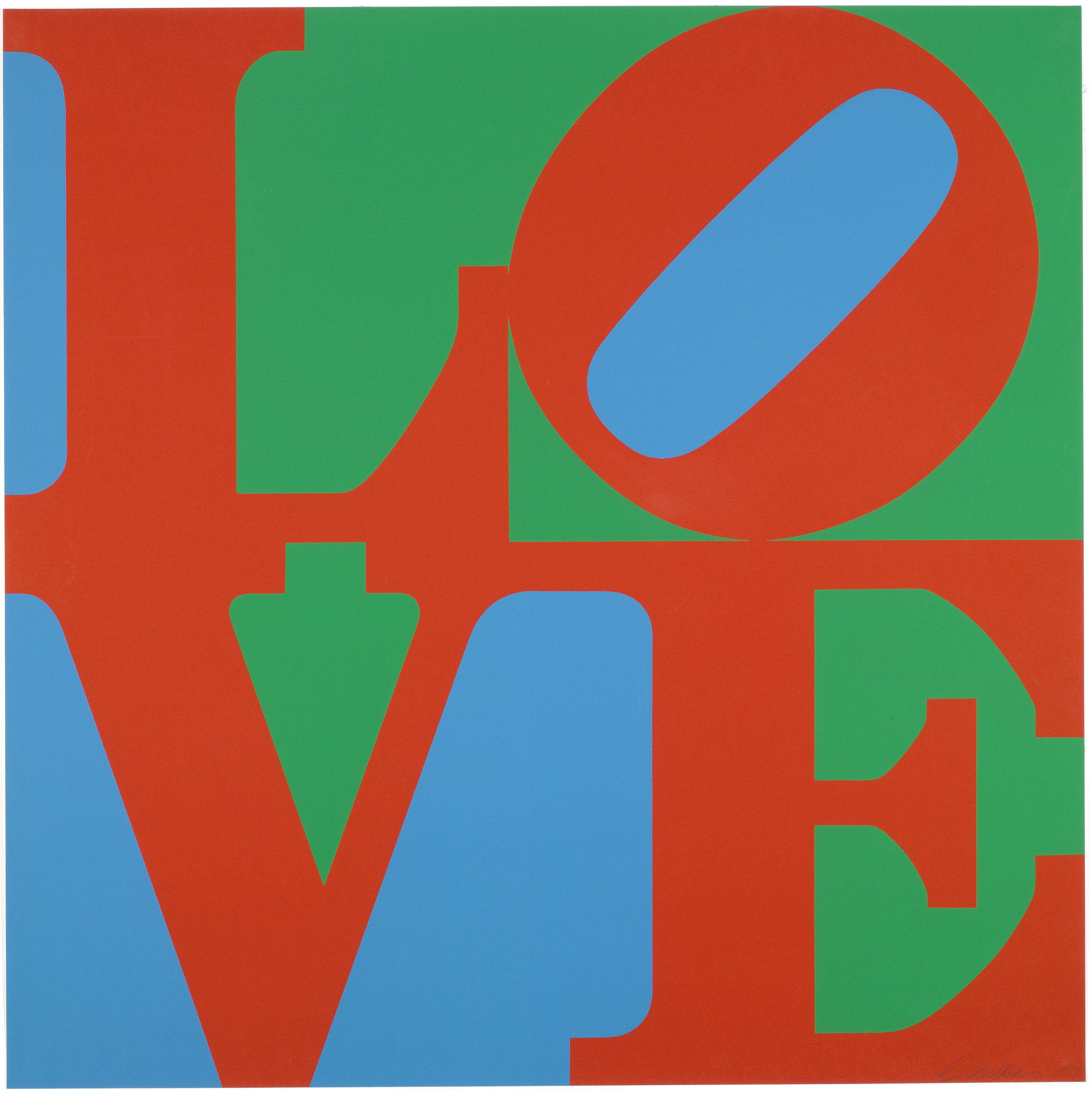
Robert Indiana's 1967 screenprint.

Love is a pop art image by American artist Robert Indiana. It consists of the letters L and O over the letters V and E in bold Didone type; the O is slanted rightward at a 45° angle.

The image LOVE was first created in 1964 in the form of a card which Robert Indiana sent to several friends and acquaintances in the art world. In 1965, he was invited to propose an artwork to be featured on the Museum of Modern Art's annual Christmas card. Indiana submitted several 12” square oil on canvas variations based on his LOVE image. The museum selected the most intense color combination in red, blue, and green. It became one of the most popular cards the museum has ever offered.

A 34" x 34" screenprint of the image (1967) is in the MoMA permanent collection. A 72" x 72" oil painting of the image (1966) is in the permanent collection of the Indianapolis Museum of Art, which also owns one of the screenprints. In 1966 Indiana worked with Marian Goodman of Multiples, Inc. to make his first LOVE sculpture in aluminum. In 1970, Indiana completed his first monumental LOVE sculpture in Cor-Ten steel, which is also in the collection of the Indianapolis Museum of Art.

== Significance ==
=== Original inspirations ===
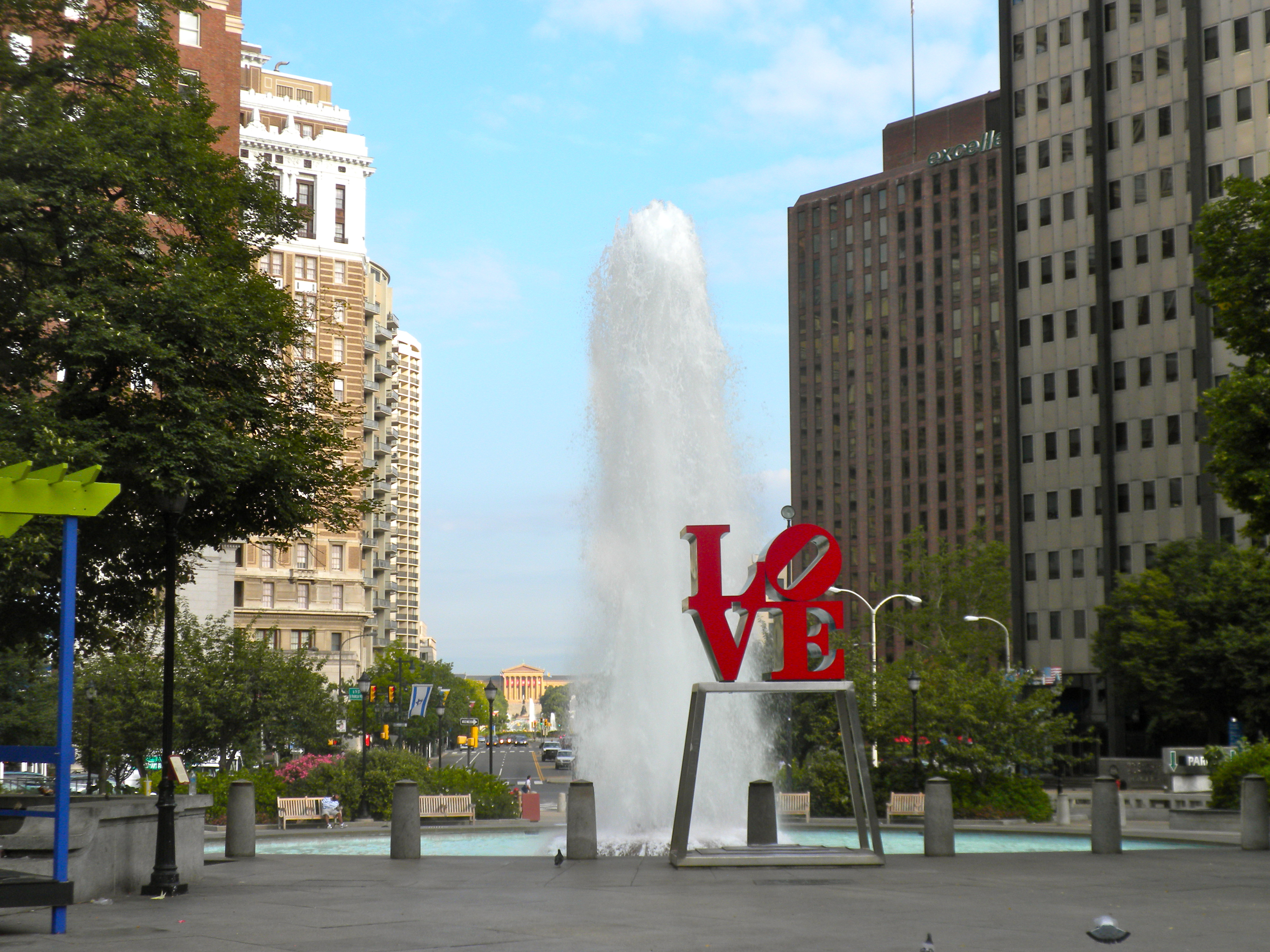
Love Park, officially John F. Kennedy Plaza, with the Philadelphia Museum of Art in the distant background

MoMA historian Deborah Wye describes Indiana's image as "full of erotic, religious, autobiographical, and political underpinnings" that make it "both accessible and complex in meaning."

The iconography first appeared in a series of poems originally written in 1958, in which Indiana stacked LO and VE on top of one another. The first paintings addressing the subject of love were 4-Star Love (1961) and Love Is God (1964).

The art historian Susan Elizabeth Ryan wrote that in 1964 LOVE had been a "more explicit four-letter word—beginning with F, and with a second letter, a U, intriguingly tilted to the right." Indiana and Ellsworth Kelly had been in a rocky relationship and Indiana had been working on word paintings. She adds "The two men were in the habit of exchanging postcard-size sketches, with Mr. Kelly laying down fields of color and Mr. Indiana adding large words atop the abstractions."

Indiana's red, blue, and green LOVE painting was then selected to appear on the Museum of Modern Art’s annual Christmas card in 1965. In an interview Robert Indiana said, "It was the most profitable Christmas card the museum ever published."

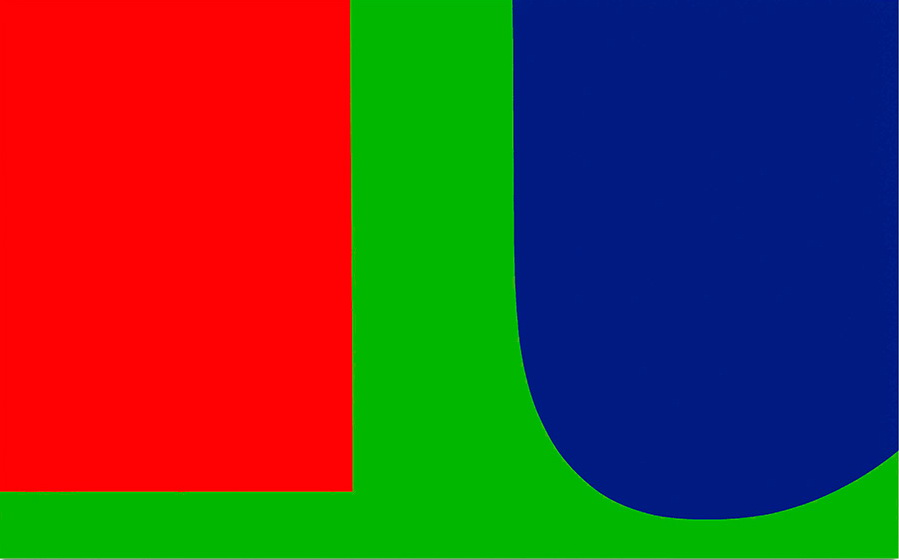
Ellsworth Kelly's 1963 painting Red Blue Green is believed to have inspired Love

Indiana said he was inspired to use these colors because his father used to work at a Phillips 66 gas station whose colors were green and red. Robert Indiana described the original colors as "the red and green of that sign against the blue Hoosier sky". Still, it is believed the colors were inspired also by the painting Red Blue Green (1963) of Ellsworth Kelly, his former partner.

Indiana said, "Ellsworth Kelly introduced me to Hard-Edge and was a great influence on my work, and is responsible for my being here".

The first serigraph/silk screen of LOVE was printed as part of an exhibition poster for Stable Gallery in 1966 on the occasion of Indiana's show dedicated to his LOVE series.

In 1973, the United States Postal Service commissioned a stamp design by Indiana and released the eight-cent LOVE stamp in advance of Valentine's Day. Unveiled in a ceremony at the Philadelphia Museum of Art, the stamp became so popular that 425 million were printed over the next two years.

== Versions ==
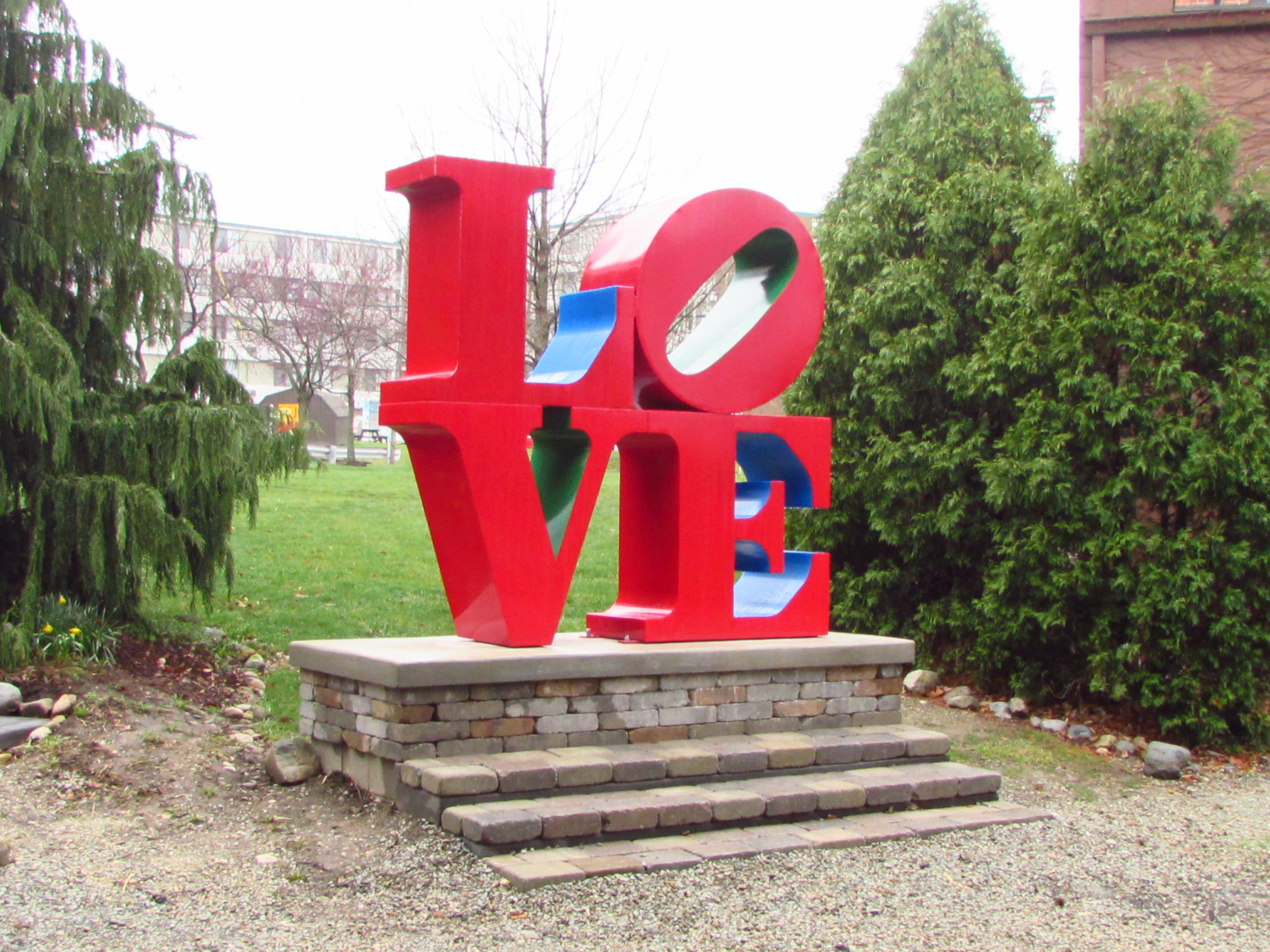
LOVE Sculpture Arts Park in New Castle, Indiana

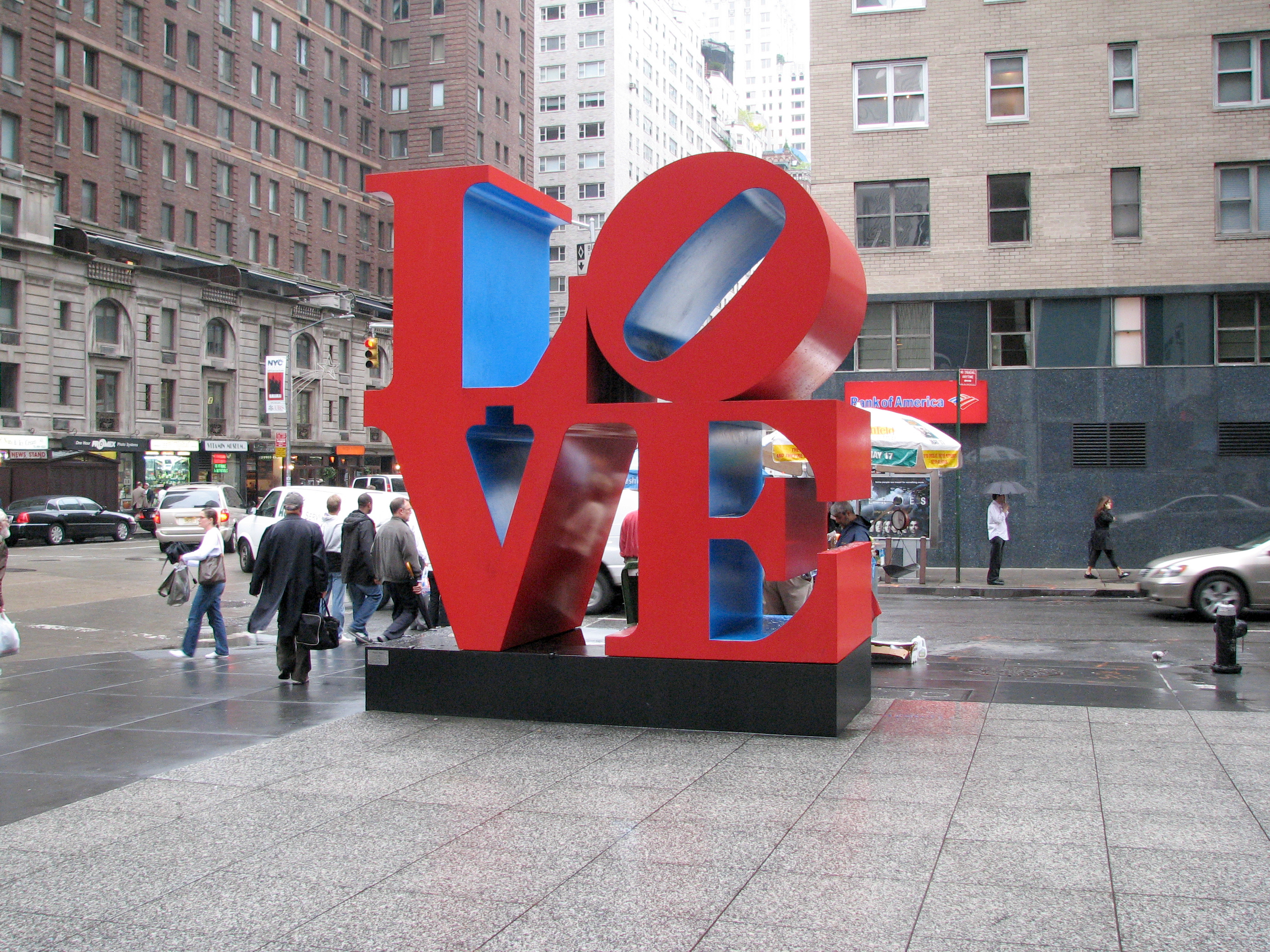
Sculpture in New York City, United States

=== Hebrew version ===
In 1977, he created a Hebrew LOVE with the four-letter word Ahava (אהבה "love" in Hebrew) using Cor-Ten steel, for the Israel Museum Art Garden in Jerusalem.

=== Variation for Google ===
For Valentine's Day 2011, Google paid homage to Indiana's LOVE, which was displayed in place of the search engine site's normal logo.

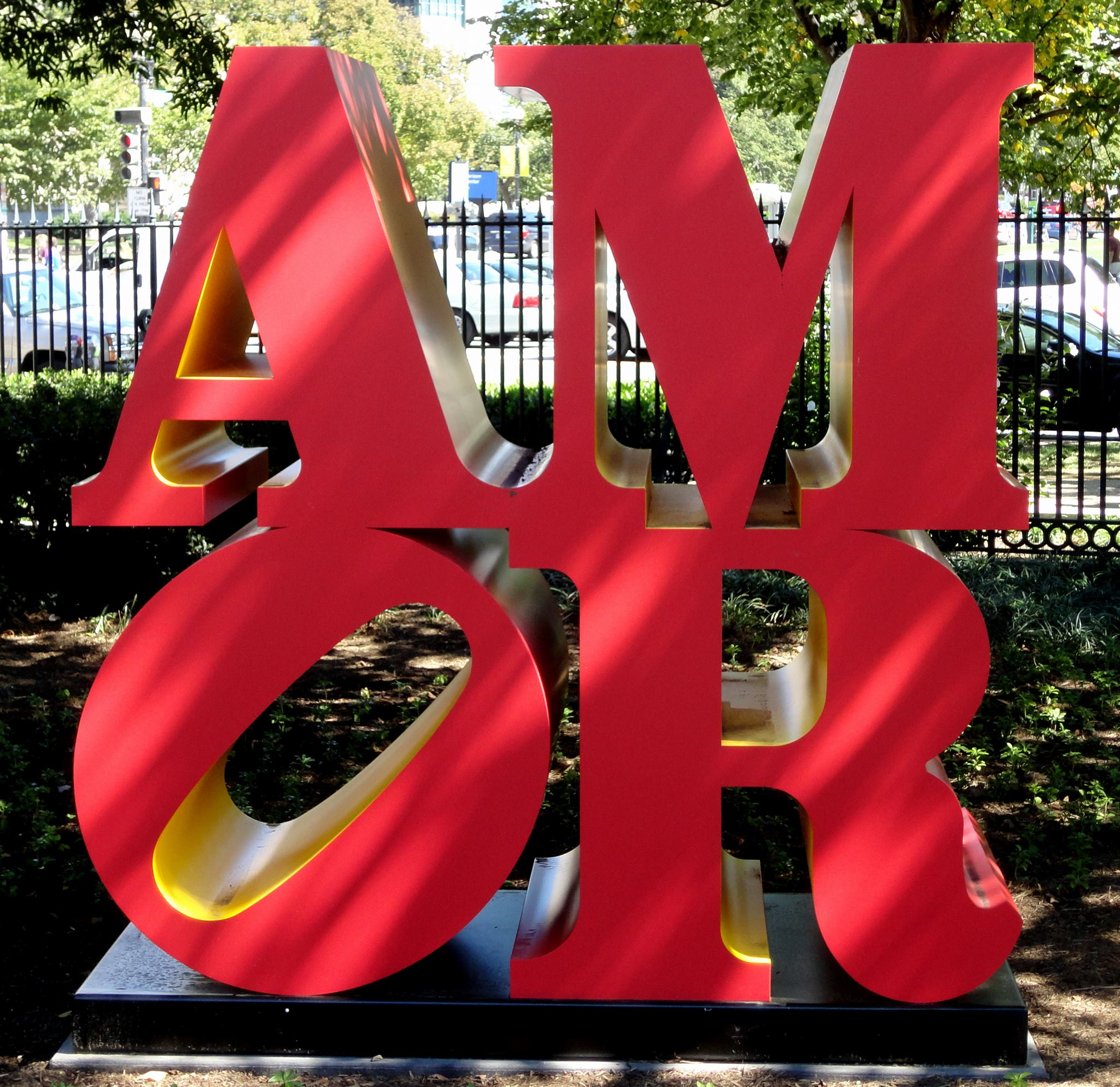
Amor, National Sculpture Garden, Washington, DC

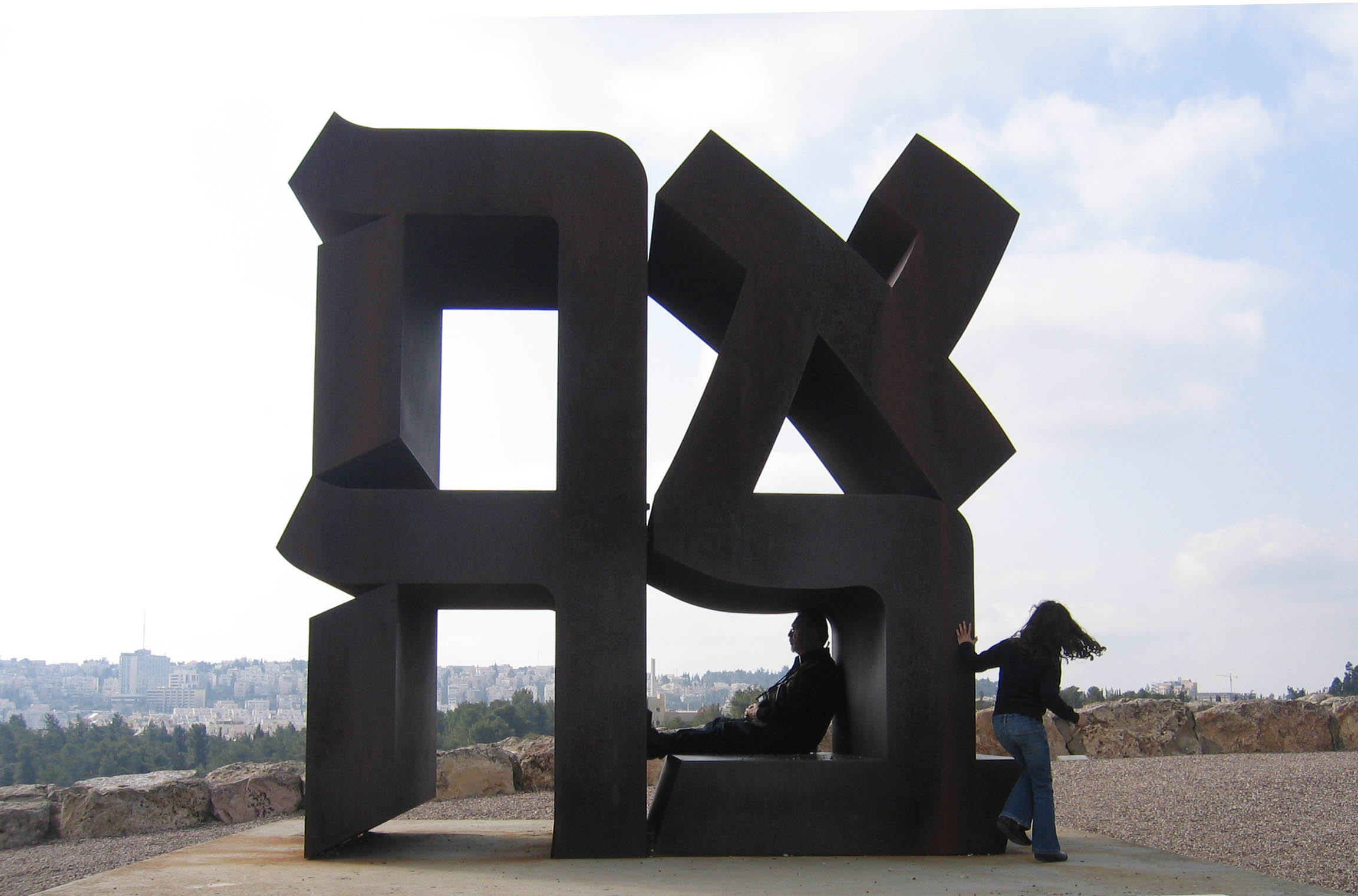
In Hebrew, at The Israel Museum, Jerusalem
