= Free Basket =

Public artwork by Los Carpinteros

- Artist: Los Carpinteros
- Year: 2010
- Dimensions: 550 cm × 1,680 cm × 3,030 cm (215 in × 663 in × 1191 in)
- Location: Indianapolis Museum of Art; Indianapolis; 39°49′31.87″N 86°11′19.75″W
- Owner: Indianapolis Museum of Art

Free Basket is a public artwork by the Cuban artist group Los Carpinteros, located in the Virginia B. Fairbanks Art & Nature Park in Indianapolis, Indiana, United States. The artwork is in the form of an international basketball court with twenty-four red or blue steel arches that travel throughout the court, mimicking the trajectory of two bouncing basketballs. Two of the arches terminate with their own regulation size basketball hoop, netting, and backboard.

== Description ==
Free Basket is located outside the formal boundaries of the Virginia B. Fairbanks Art & Nature Park on city owned property. The parking loop surrounding the artwork is situated just south of the lake and west of the Indianapolis Museum of Art. The artwork can be accessed by car via West 38th Street and footpath from the museum grounds. Free Basket is a site-specific work consisting of 24 red- or blue-painted steel tubular arches that mimic the trajectory of two bouncing basketballs. The arches travel throughout the court and are of varying heights and span widths. Two of the arches (one red and one blue) are capped at midpoint, each with their own basketball backboard fashioned with: backboard, metal rim, and nylon net. The steel arches have been mounted on a level, rectangular concrete surface that is size of an international basketball court, where they have been filled and secured with concrete cement. The concrete court has been surfaced with Rhino Guard colored plastic and has been painted to the standards of an international basketball court. The primary court color is yellow, the “goal lines” are painted white, and sections of black and green flank both sides of the court, and a black border surrounds entire court. There are also built-in lighting systems that have been sunk into the court to illuminate the sculpture.

== Historical information ==
Los Carpinteros sought to portray the juxtaposition of the practical and the imaginary with Free Basket, and drew on the history of sports in Indianapolis to merge art, sports, and culture.

The sculpture is referenced in John Green's novel The Fault in Our Stars when the main characters, Hazel and Augustus, have a picnic in the Virginia B. Fairbanks Art & Nature Park: "We drove right past the museum and parked right next to this basketball court filled with huge red and blue arcs that imagined the path of a bouncing ball."

=== Location history ===
This artwork was installed at the IMA in May 2010.

=== Acquisition ===
Free Basket has been acquired by the Indianapolis Museum of Art.

== Condition ==
In general, the artwork requires regular cleaning of both the steel and court components to discourage the buildup of damaging materials. Instrumental analysis involving the artwork's color and gloss levels has also been recorded.

== See also ==
- Team Building (Align)
- Eden II
