= Park of the Laments =

2010 public artwork by Alfredo Jaar

- Artist: Alfredo Jaar
- Year: 2010
- Dimensions: 5,500 cm × 5,500 cm (2160 in × 2160 in)
- Location: Indianapolis Museum of Art; Indianapolis; 39°49′37.73″N 86°11′18″W
- Owner: Alfredo Jaar and Galerie Lelong

Park of the Laments is a public artwork by Chilean artist Alfredo Jaar, located in the Virginia B. Fairbanks Art & Nature Park, in Indianapolis, Indiana, United States. The artwork consists of an enclosed park space in the form of a square placed within a square, the inner parameter being made from limestone-filled gabion baskets, and the outer from indigenous trees and shrubs. The park space is only accessible by a concrete enclosed tunnel. The installation has a landscape design that consists of over 3,000 individual plant species from 53 different genera.

== Description ==
Park of the Laments is situated in the woodland area southeast of the lake in 100 acres. The overall form of the park is a square within a square—one is rigid and made of limestone-filled gabion baskets, while the other consists of indigenous trees and shrubs. Natural, minimalist wooden benches, made from kiln-treated poplar, are built into the edge of an amphitheater of stairs, vines, and stones. The viewer begins their experience by walking down a concrete platform flanked on both sides with limestone-filled gabion baskets and indigenous shrubbery. During their walk, the baskets become taller in the form of a progressive step system that correlates with the actual topography of the landscape; the minimum height is approximately 2 feet (0.61 m) and the maximum is about 12 feet (3.7 m). At that point, the viewer is taken underground through a dark, pre-cast concrete box culvert tunnel (made of nine individual segments, attached and mortared together) and directed towards the sunlit area on the other end of the tunnel. The entire length of the tunnel is approximately 72 feet (22 m) in length. The visitor then proceeds up the stairs to reach the enclosed park area, where no other portion of the Art & Nature Park is visible due to both the surrounding gabion baskets and natural woodlands. There the visitor may sit or interact with the space and be surrounded by over 53 different indigenous plant species located within the installation (more than 3,000 plants total).

== Historical information ==
The artwork was installed at the Indianapolis Museum of Art in May 2010.Park of the Laments is a project that follows along the lines of Jaar's Public Intervention series in which the viewer/visitor is an active participant within the environment and contributes to the underlying theme or concept of the project. Visitors enter the work outside the park and continue through a tunnel. Moving towards the light, they approach stairs that lead them above ground into the center of the park where they are greeted by an isolated, calm, and secluded area conducive to meditation and lamentation. Like many of Jaar's Interventions, the intention of the space's design is to initiate a physical, emotional, and psychological journey within the viewer, ultimately drawing parallels between the experience of physical space and human emotion.

== Artist ==
Alfred Jaar (b. 1956) is an artist, architect, and filmmaker who lives and works in New York and was born in Santiago de Chile. He attended Instituto Chileno-Norteamericano de Cultura, Santiago (1979) and University of Chile (1981). In addition to Park of the Laments, Jaar has created more than sixty "Public Interventions" around the world. Alfredo Jaar incorporates photography, film, text, and sculpture into works that look at the relationship between ethics and aesthetics. His works draw from first-hand witness accounts and research on issues such as toxic waste in Africa, gold mining in Brazil, and genocide in Rwanda. Jaar has received many awards, including a John D. and Catherine T. MacArthur Foundation Award (2000); a Louis Comfort Tiffany Foundation Award (1987); and fellowships from the National Endowment for the Arts (1987); and the John Simon Guggenheim Memorial Foundation (1985). He has had major exhibitions at the Museum of Fine Arts (Houston), Houston (2005); Museum of Contemporary Art of Rome (2005); MIT List Visual Arts Center, Cambridge, Massachusetts (1999); and the Museum of Contemporary Art, Chicago (1992).

== See also ==
- Team Building (Align)
- Bench Around the Lake
