= Virginia B. Fairbanks Art & Nature Park =

Public art park in Indianapolis, Indiana, US

- 100 Acres, Fairbanks Park
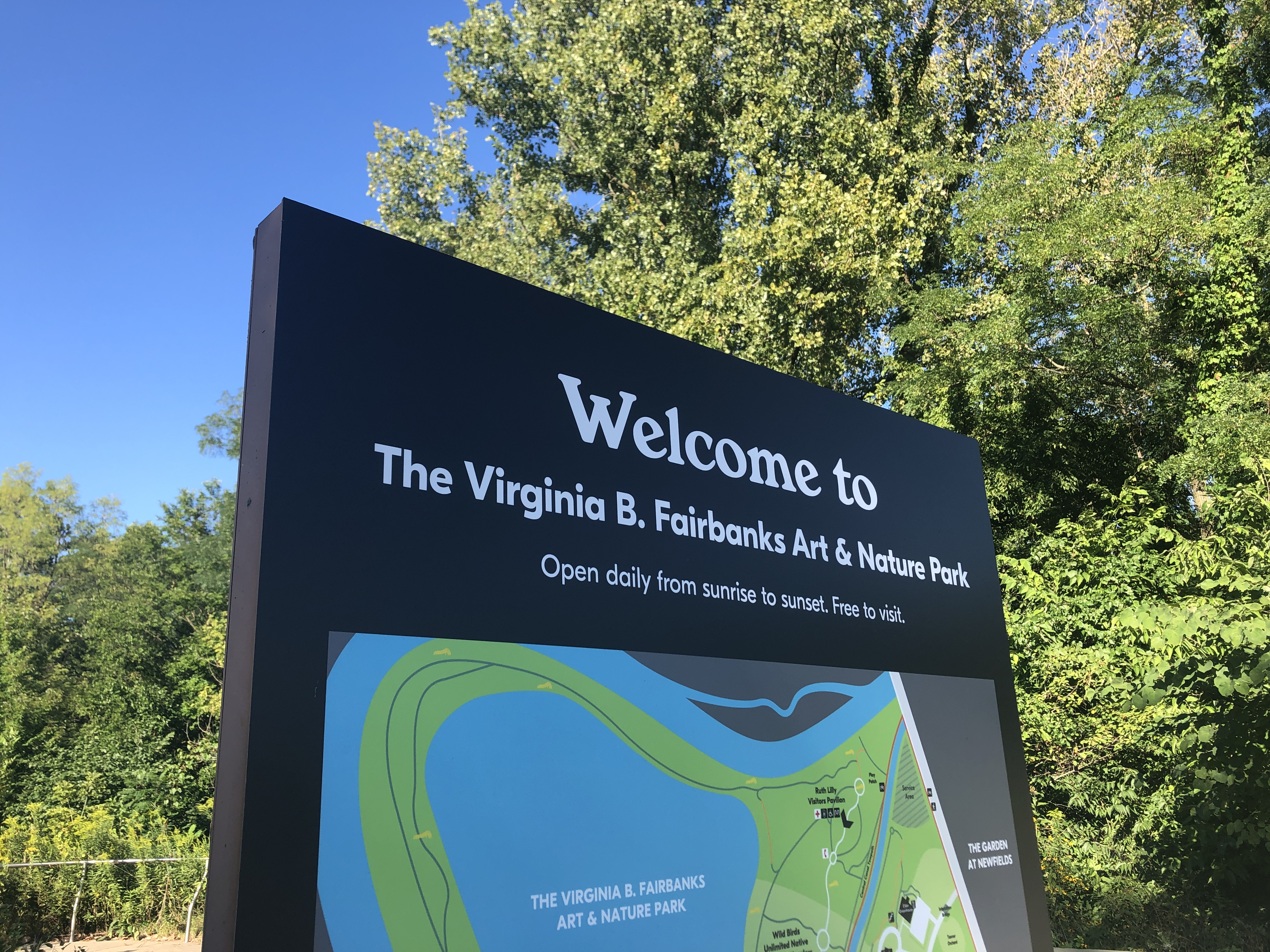
- Park entrance signage in 2022
- Interactive map of Virginia B. Fairbanks Art & Nature Park
- Type: Nature park Sculpture park
- Location: Indianapolis, Indiana, U.S.
- Coordinates: 39°49′38″N 86°11′25″W
- Area: 100 acres (40 ha)
- Opened: June 20, 2010; 16 years ago
- Designer: Edward L. Blake, Jr.
- Owner: Indianapolis Museum of Art
- Open: Daily, sunrise to sunset
- Status: Open all year
- Parking: 40-space lot
- Public transit: 38
- Bicycle facilities: Indiana Pacers Bikeshare
- Facilities: Ruth Lilly Visitors Pavilion
- Website: Official website

The Virginia B. Fairbanks Art & Nature Park, also referred to as the 100 Acres or simply Fairbanks Park, is a public interactive art park located on the Newfields (Indianapolis Museum of Art) campus in Indianapolis, Indiana, United States.

Opened in 2010, the 100-acre (40 ha) park is among the largest of its kind in the U.S., including an inaugural collection of eight site-specific art installations by national and international artists. Other features include walking paths, natural landscaping, and the Ruth Lilly Visitors Pavilion. Admission to the park is free and open from dawn to dusk.

The park is situated within a floodplain west of the Indianapolis Museum of Art and Oldfields, bordered on the east by the Indiana Central Canal and on the north and west by a meander in the White River. The park was intentionally developed to emphasize surrounding natural features, including woods, meadows, wetlands, and a 30-to-40-acre (12 to 16 ha) quarry lake. Virginia B. Fairbanks, the wife of benefactor Richard M. Fairbanks, is the park's namesake.

== History ==
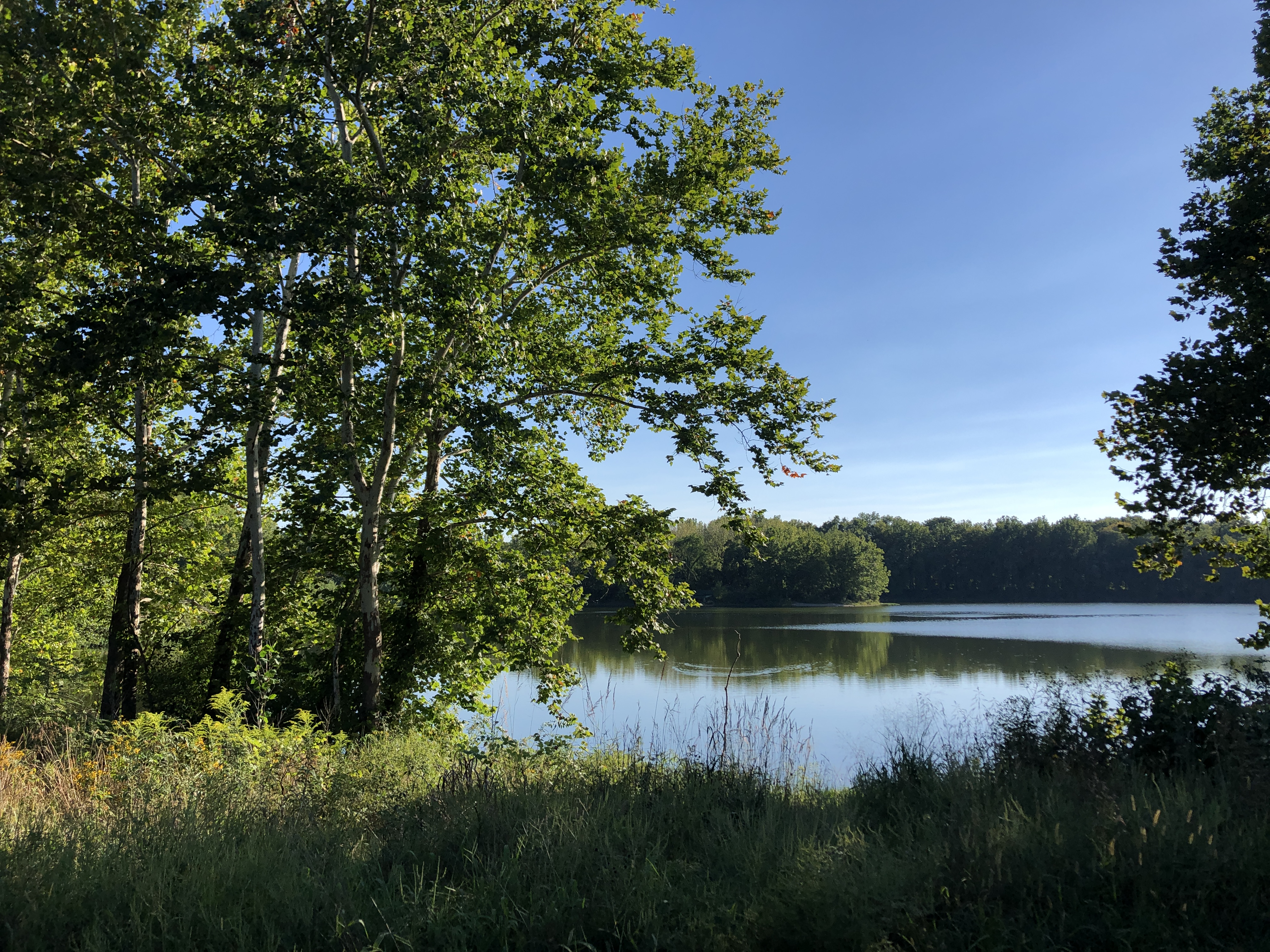
The park's lake is a remnant of the site's past use as a quarry

During the construction of nearby Interstate 65, gravel was excavated from the site by Huber, Hunt & Nichols, which later donated the land to the Indianapolis Museum of Art in 1972. In the proceeding years, the former quarry site remained largely untouched.

In acknowledgment of the site's popularity with trespassers, the museum partnered with Indianapolis Greenways and the Indianapolis Water Company to formally open the site for public use in 1999. At this time, museum officials began maintaining desire paths around the lake and clearing invasive plant species. Further, the museum adopted a US$160 million master plan that proposed developing the site into a public art and nature park. A preliminary site plan was developed by landscape architecture firm Moore Iacofano Goltsman Inc.

In 2004, the museum commissioned landscape architect Edward L. Blake Jr. and architect Marlon Blackwell to design the park with an emphasis on its natural setting. Gifts totaling US$15 million were granted to the museum from the Richard M. Fairbanks Foundation in 2001 and 2006 to offset initial operations expenses for the park. In 2007, the museum announced the selection of the first ten artists whose work would be installed in the park.

In 2008, the museum scaled back some elements of the park. A planned US$8 million, 1,500-foot (460 m) walkway designed by artist Mary Miss was canceled due to concerns of cost and the piece's impact on the surrounding natural environment. Miss was invited to contribute a piece that would be "more environmentally sensitive" and less "engineering-intense". The Ruth Lilly Visitors Center was downsized due to building constraints in the floodplain. Due to scheduling conflicts, commissioned artists Haluk Akakçe and Peter Eisenman were forced to postpone their involvement, while Jeppe Hein was added to the roster of inaugural artists.

At the park's groundbreaking on September 18, 2008, Maxwell L. Anderson, director and chief executive officer for the Indianapolis Museum of Art at the time, said:

(We are) taking a property which began in effect as an industrial site after it left the natural one, became a wasteland, and then nature reclaimed it. And today the IMA hopes to leave nature in charge to a very considerable extent.

The park was anticipated to open in September 2009 but was delayed due to impacts from the Great Recession. The completed park opened to the public on June 20, 2010. The park's primary visionary was Lisa Freiman, and it was co-developed by Sarah Urist Green.

Landscape architecture firm DAVID RUBIN Land Collective was commissioned by the Indianapolis Museum of Art to complete a 30-year land use master plan for the full 152-acre (62 ha) Newfields campus. Adopted in 2017, the master plan called for several developments to the park, including a new footbridge across the Indiana Central Canal and an allée to create a visual axis from Oldfields to the lake in 100 Acres.

In 2019, the Richard M. Fairbanks Foundation awarded Newfields a US$10 million grant to fund park upgrades, including improved pedestrian and bicyclist connectivity, additional restrooms and parking, and the creation of an endowment for continued maintenance and new art installations.

In January 2023, Newfields announced the "Home Again" exhibition, including the addition of three works to the park: Oracle of Intimation by Heather Hart; The Pollinator Pavilion by Mark Dion and Dana Sherwood; and This is NOT a Refuge by Anila Quayyum Agha. The exhibition was curated by the park's first director, Lisa Freiman, who served in various roles at the Indianapolis Museum of Art until 2013. The exhibition was underwritten by a US$3 million gift from local entrepreneur and former trustee Kent Hawryluk. The three pieces are planned to be installed in June 2023 on the Hawryluk Sculpture Green.

== Collection ==
Map of current and former artworks
1 Bench Around the Lake
2 Chop Stick
3 Eden II
4 Free Basket
5 Funky Bones
6 Indianapolis Island
7 Park of the Laments
8 Stratum Pier
9 Team Building (Align)

=== Current ===
- Bench Around the Lake (2010), Jeppe Hein
- Free Basket (2010), Los Carpinteros
- Funky Bones (2010), Joep van Lieshout
- Park of the Laments (2010), Alfredo Jaar
- Stratum Pier (2010), Kendall Buster
- Team Building (Align) (2010), Type A

=== Former ===
- Chop Stick (2012), visiondivision
- Eden II (2010), Tea Mäkipää
- FLOW: Can You See the River? (2011), Mary Miss
- Indianapolis Island (2010), Andrea Zittel
- NOTICE: A Flock of Signs (2013), Kim Beck

== Grounds ==
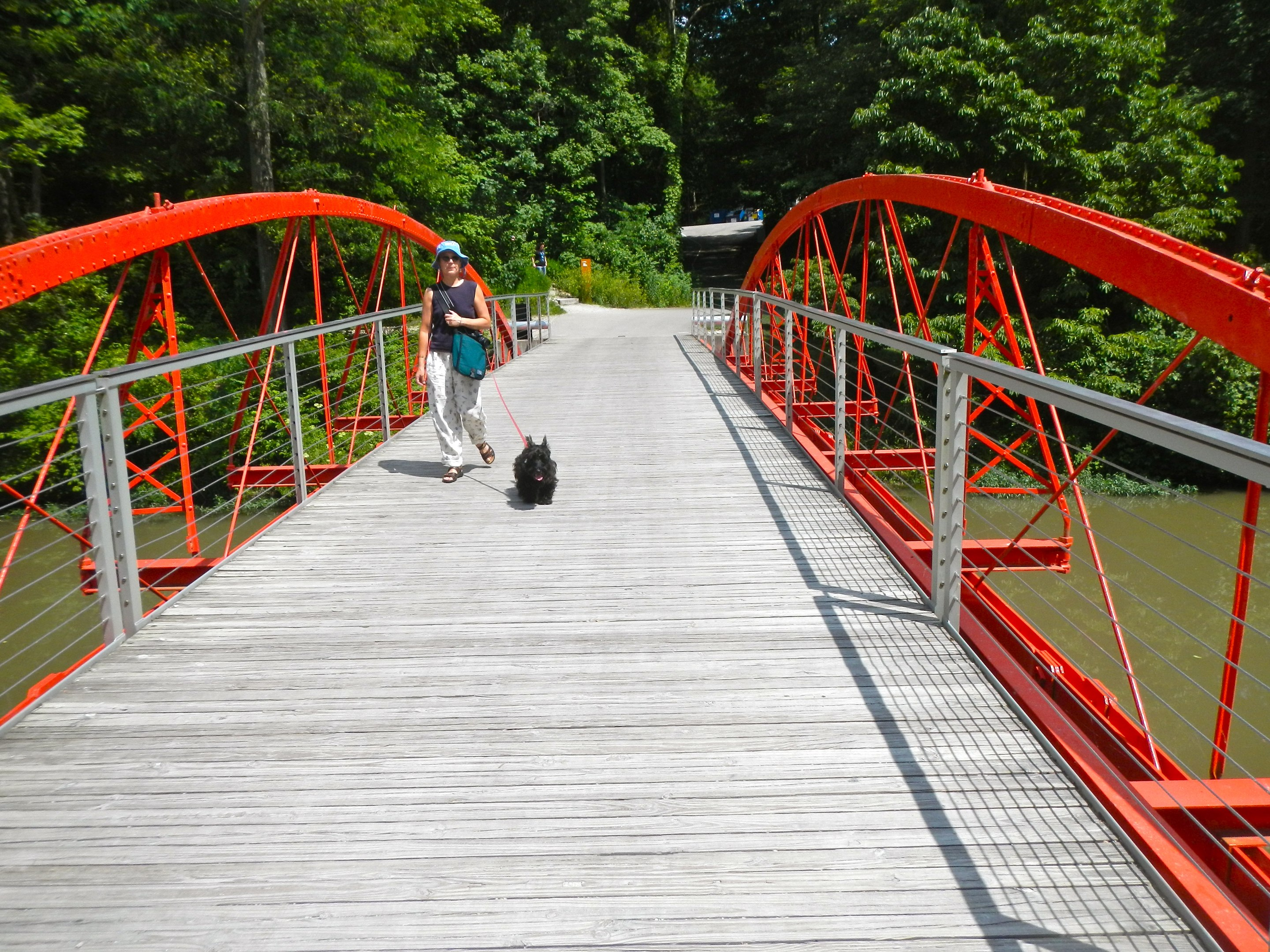
Waller Bridge over the Indiana Central Canal

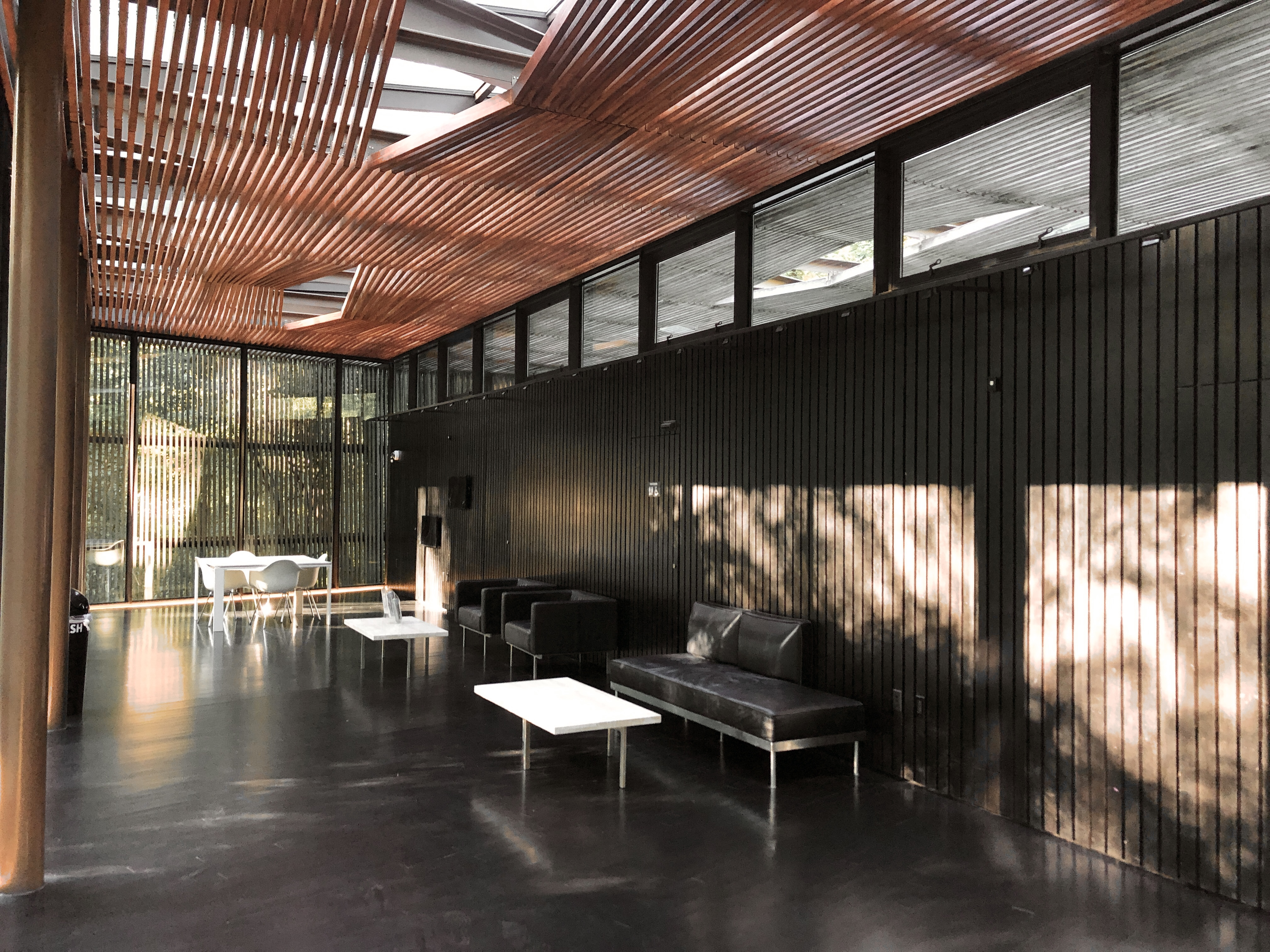
Interior of the Ruth Lilly Visitors Pavilion

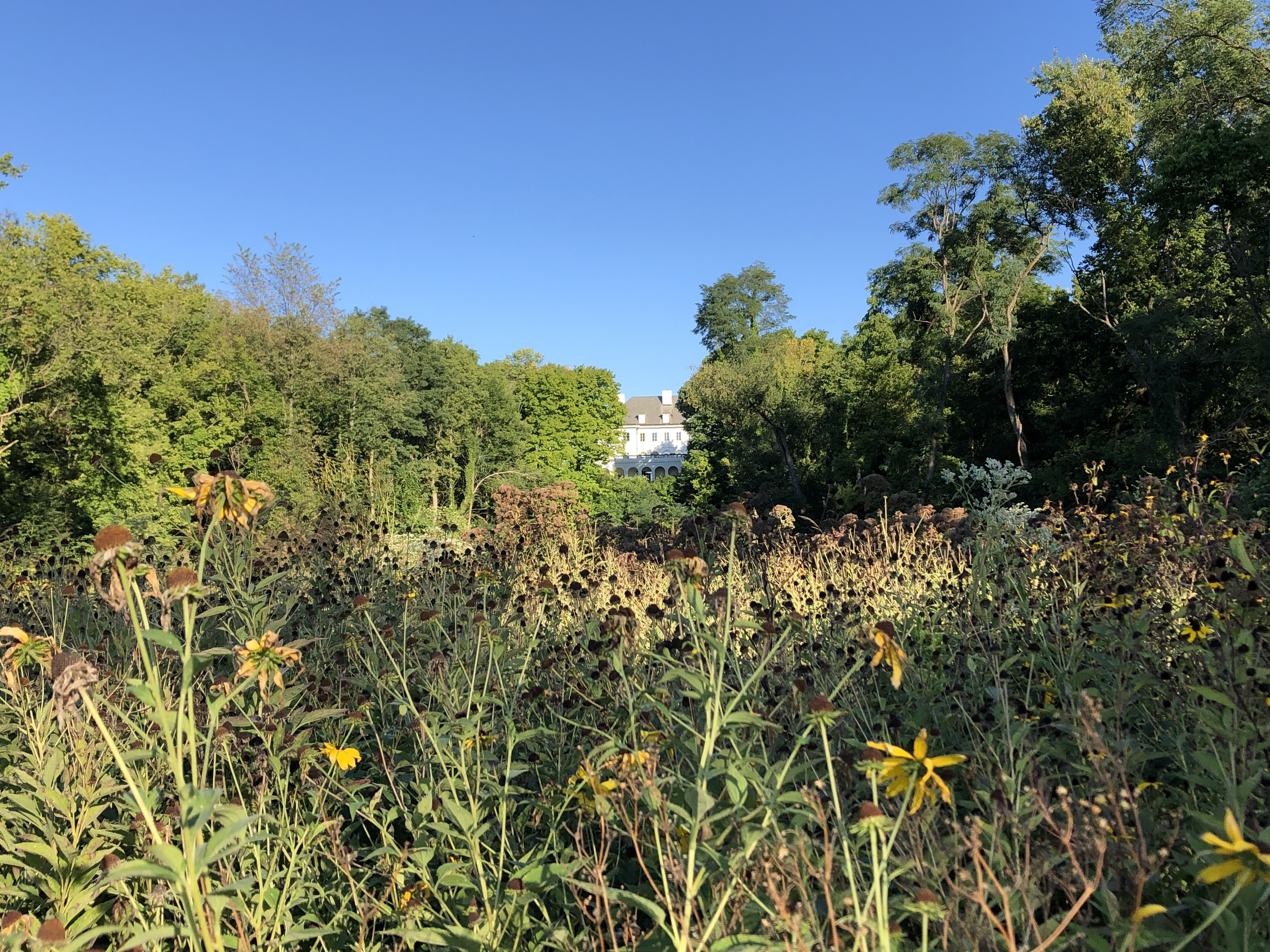
Oldfields visible from the Wild Birds Unlimited Native Pollinator Meadow

Waller Bridge, a bowstring pony truss footbridge spanning the Indiana Central Canal, allows pedestrians to travel between the park and the rest of the Newfields campus. The bridge was originally located in Montgomery County, Indiana, constructed by the King Bridge Company in 1873. The bridge was later moved to its current site and restored with some contemporary modifications.

The Central Canal Towpath, a shared-use path of crushed limestone, runs along the eastern perimeter of the park paralleling the canal. The trail serves as a regional connector for pedestrians and bicyclists, linking the park to the Monon Trail at its northern terminus in the Broad Ripple neighborhood and Fall Creek Greenway at its southern terminus. Bicycle parking racks and an Indiana Pacers Bikeshare docking station are available.

The park's 40-space surface parking lot is accessible to motorists from W. 38th St. via the N. White River Pkwy. E. Dr. exit ramp. A pedestrian crosswalk leads visitors from the parking lot to the Edgar and Dorothy Fehnel Entrance.

=== Ruth Lilly Visitors Pavilion ===
Architect Marlon Blackwell was commissioned to design the Ruth Lilly Visitors Pavilion in 2004. Inspired by a fallen leaf, Blackwell's design blends wood, glass, and steel with environmental sustainability systems focused on water and energy efficiency. The 1,290-square-foot (120 m^{2}) LEED-certified building is situated within the park's northeastern woods, containing a multipurpose room and restrooms. The pavilion has earned accolades from the American Institute of Architects (AIA), Architect Magazine, and Chicago Athenaeum, among others. In 2021, a six-person panel of AIA Indianapolis members identified the pavilion among the ten most "architecturally significant" buildings completed in the city since World War II.

=== Wild Birds Unlimited Native Pollinator Meadow ===
The pollinator meadow was announced as part of a US$10 million grant from the Richard M. Fairbanks Foundation in 2019. Former Newfields trustee Edgar Fehnel gifted the institution US$100,000 to help fund the pollinator meadow in addition to US$100,000 from the Nina Mason Pulliam Charitable Trust to help fund environmental sustainability and nature conservancy efforts.

== In popular culture ==
The park and two of its resident installations—Free Basket and Funky Bones—are referenced in author John Green's 2012 novel The Fault in Our Stars. A replica of Funky Bones was created in Pittsburgh, Pennsylvania, for the 2014 film adaptation. In 2016, the park was featured in the episode "Man Made Marvels" on the Smithsonian Channel television series Aerial America.

== See also ==
- List of sculpture parks
- List of outdoor artworks at Newfields
- List of parks in Indianapolis
- List of attractions and events in Indianapolis
