= Joep van Lieshout =

Dutch artist and sculptor

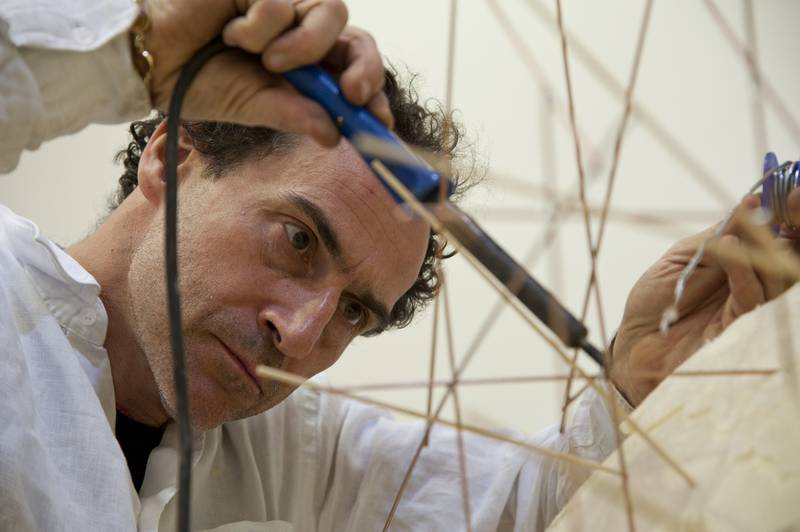
Joep van Lieshout, 2014.

Joep van Lieshout (born 1963), is a Dutch artist and sculptor born in Ravenstein, Netherlands, and founder of Atelier Van Lieshout (AVL).

== Life and work ==
Van Lieshout received his formal education and training from the Academy of Modern Art in Rotterdam (1980–1985), Ateliers '63 in Haarlem (1985–1987), and from the Villa Arson in Nice, France (1987).

In 1995 Van Lieshout formed the Atelier Van Lieshout (AVL) studio group in Rotterdam, Netherlands, where the company continues to design and fabricate their widely exhibited works. Atelier Van Lieshout has attained international recognition for objects-based projects that balance on the boundary between art, architecture and design.

Recurring themes in the work of AVL include self-sufficiency, power, politics, and the more classical themes of life and death. The name Atelier Van Lieshout emphasizes the fact that, although Joep van Lieshout founded and leads the collective, the work produced stems from the creative impulses of the entire team. One of his notable public artworks, Funky Bones, is located at the Indianapolis Museum of Art's Virginia B. Fairbanks Art & Nature Park in Indiana, United States.

== Atelier Van Lieshout ==
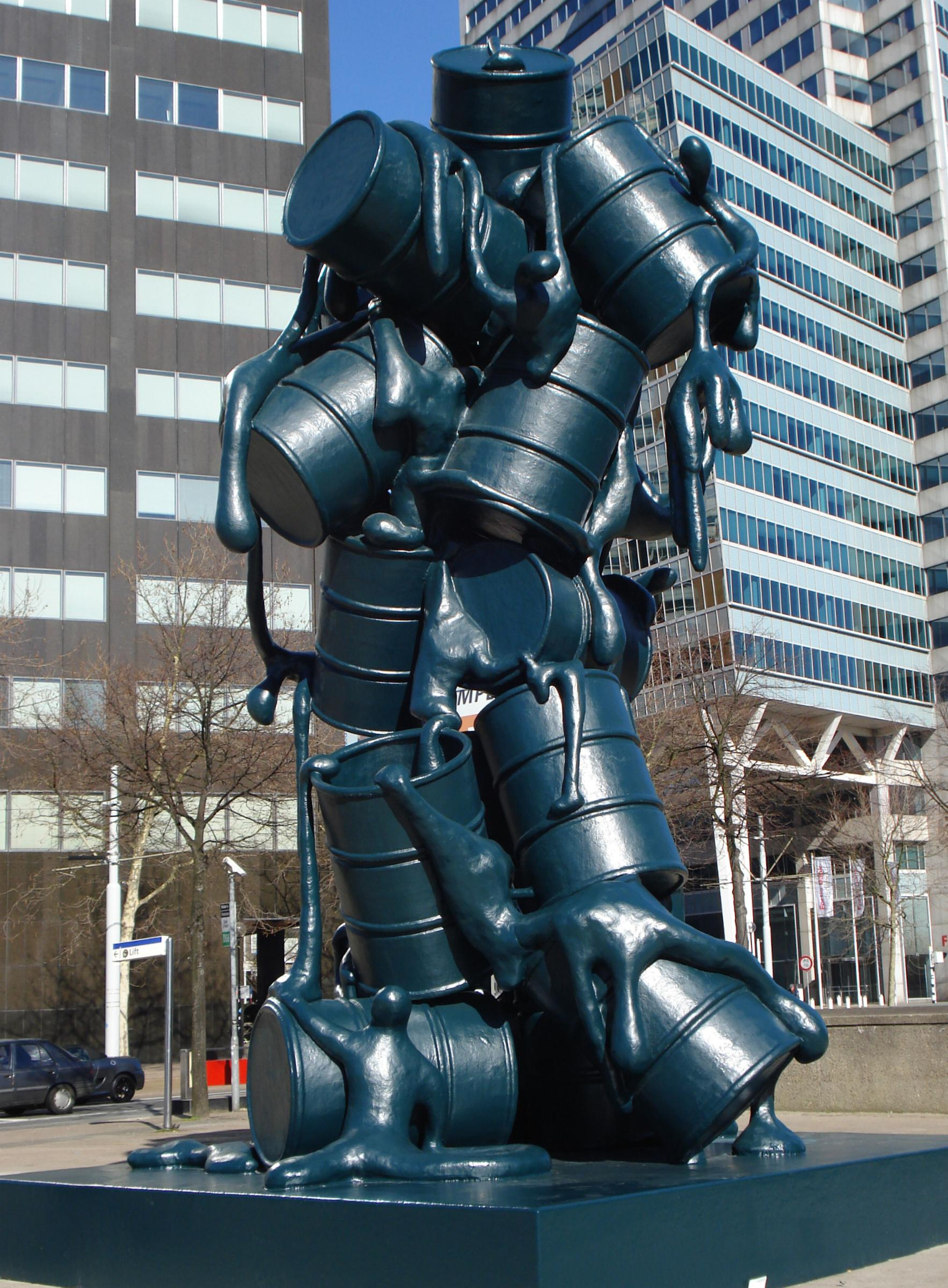
Sculpture Cascade, Rotterdam

Atelier Van Lieshout (AVL) is the studio of sculptor Joep van Lieshout founded in 1995 in Rotterdam, Netherlands, where the company continues to create and fabricate their widely exhibited works. The name Atelier Van Lieshout emphasizes the fact that, although Joep van Lieshout founded and leads the studio, the work produced stems from the creative impulses of the entire team.

Recurring themes in the work of Atelier Van Lieshout include self-sufficiency, power, politics, and the more classical themes of life and death. Atelier Van Lieshout has attained international recognition for objects-based projects that balance on the boundary between art, architecture and design.

=== Concept development ===
Atelier Van Lieshout's most relevant recurring themes are domestication, politics, complex functioning systems, and the re-contextualization of familiar, domestic objects. The Atelier van Lieshout claims to make no distinction between "real artworks" and "just building something for someone."

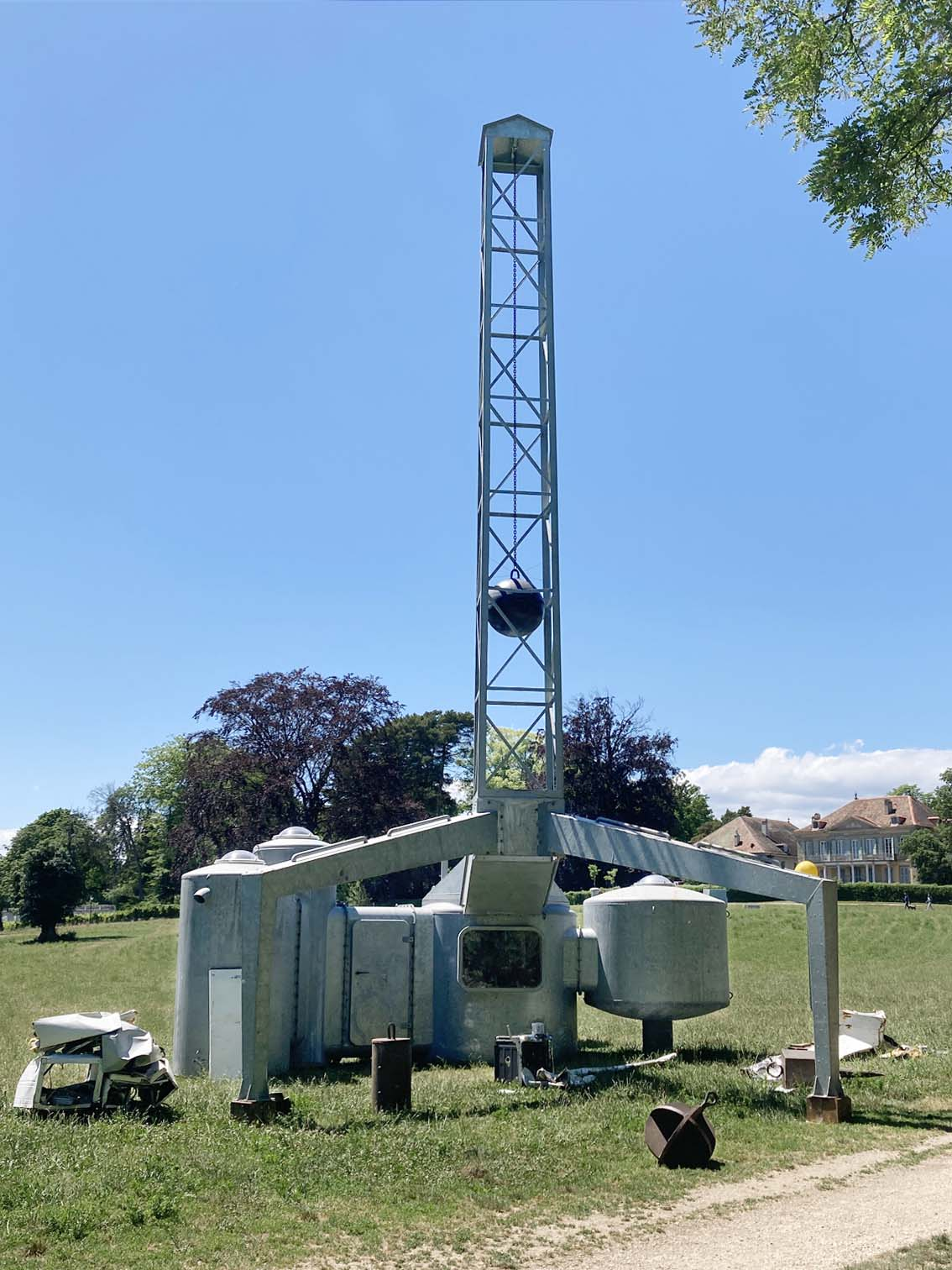
Atelier van Lieshout, Drop Hammer House, 2018 as exhibited at OPEN HOUSE, Geneva in 2022

Many projects by Atelier Van Lieshout include livable "houses" each with their own "theme", such as the "Mobile Home for Kröller Müller" (1995), "Autocrat" (1997), Dynamo (2010) or Drop Hammer House (2018), with special functions and the according materials and furniture elements.

Joep van Lieshout focuses on creating artworks whose design principles challenge conventional ideas of utility and functionality by reinventing how the viewer perceives or approaches an object and the environment in which it is placed. This is achieved by the implementation of non-traditional materials and color palettes, odd or unusual subject matter, and through the strategic positioning or locale of the artwork.

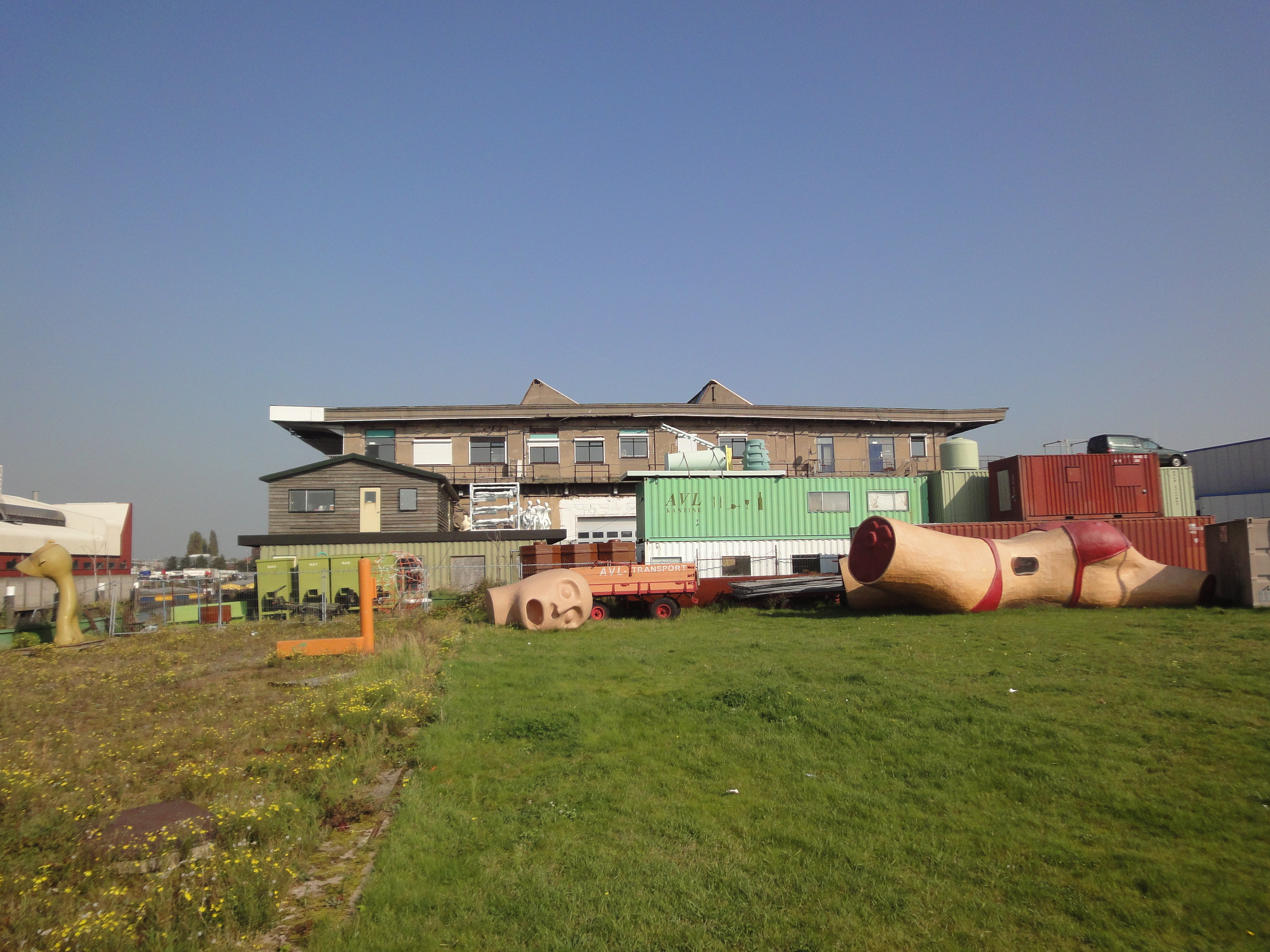
AVL-Ville, 2011

For example, in the 2010 public artwork Funky Bones it is impossible to see in its entirety except at a distance, preferably from above. Moving close enough to actually interact with it produces an entirely different perspective.

=== AVL-Ville ===
AVL-Ville is the Free State of Atelier Van Lieshout in the Rotterdam harbour during the Rotterdam Cultural Capital year 2001. Originally designed as a place for experiments and inventions for the city of Almere. After Almere rejected the proposal Atelier Van Lieshout decided to realize its pioneer city on own property in the Rotterdam harbour.

The Autocrat and Workshop for Weapons & Bombs found a home along with new works like the Pioneer Set and AVL Transport.

AVL-Ville also created its own flag, its own constitution and its own currency.

=== Domestikator Louvre controversy ===
In October 2017, an AVL work titled "Domestikator" (2015) was scheduled for inclusion in the exhibition Hors Les Murs, (Foire Internationale d'Art Contemperain's outdoor program of architectural projects, sculptures, performances, and sound pieces that runs concurrently to the fair) held in the Tuileries Garden at the Louvre in Paris. On 17 October 2017 the President of the Louvre, Jean-Luc Martinez pulled the work from the exhibition, on the grounds that the piece, in which two interlocking buildings appear to be engaged in a sexual act, would have been displayed near a playground. The work was instead displayed by the Centre Georges Pompidou in the front square outside of that art institution for a simultaneous run.

== Awards ==
- 1991: Charlotte Köhler Award
- 1992: Prix de Rome Award
- 1995: Bolidt Floor Concepts 1995, 1st prize
- 1996: 87.Katalogförderpreis 1996, Alfried Krupp von Bohlen und Halbach Stiftung
- 1997: Hendrik Chabot Award 1997
- 1998: Mart Stam 1998 Award
- 2000: Wilhelmina-ring, Sculpture Award
- 2004: Kurt Schwitters Award
- 2009: Stankowski Award

== See also ==
- The Monument (Atelier Van Lieshout)
