= Domestikator =

2015 sculpture by Atelier Van Lieshout

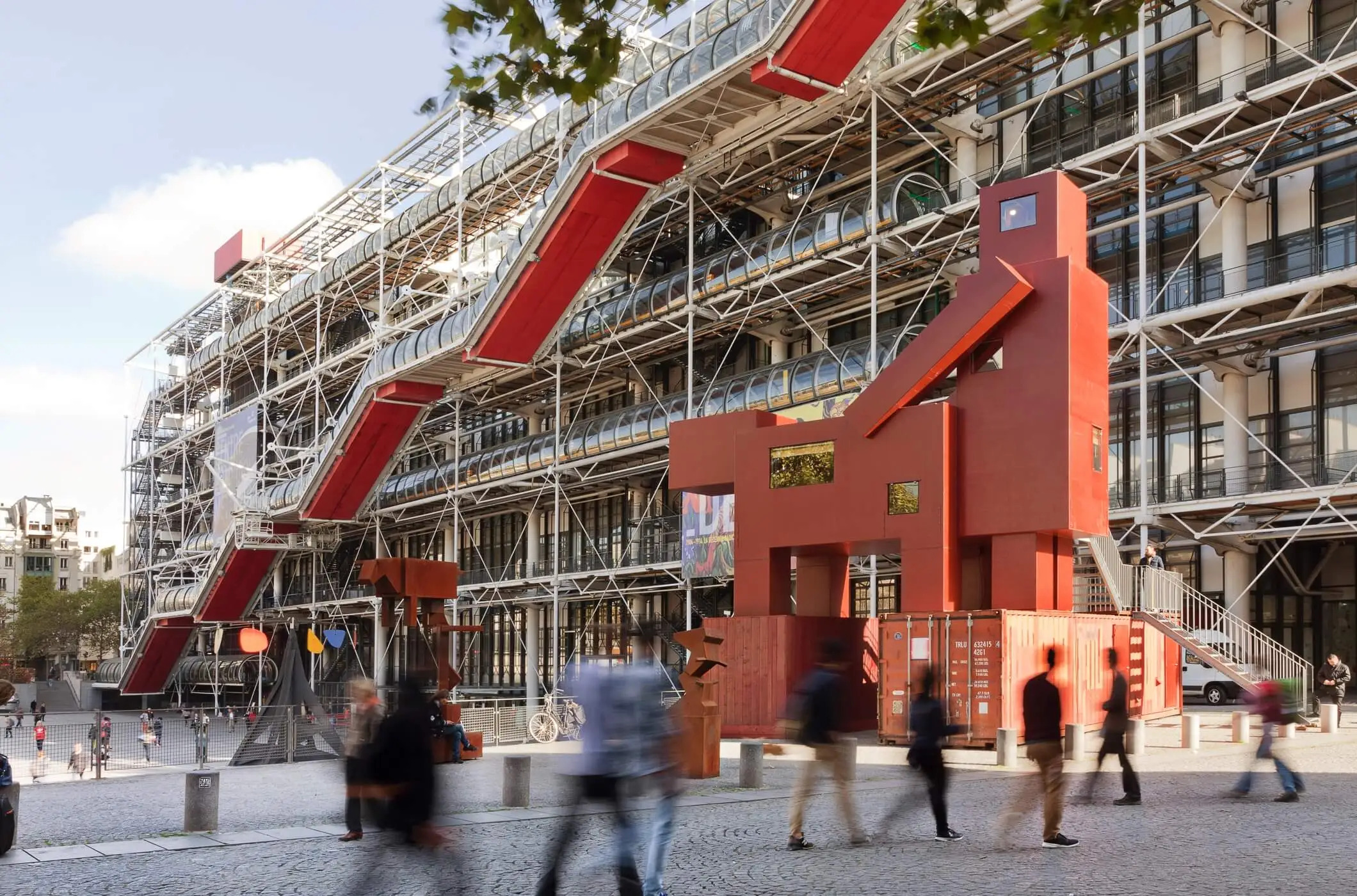

Domestikator is a 2015 architectural sculpture by Atelier Van Lieshout. The work has been the subject of considerable controversy wherein on October 7, 2017 The President of the Louvre in Paris, France, Jean-Luc Martinez objected to the work in which two interlocking buildings appear to be engaged in a sexual act and pulled it from the exhibition Hors Les Murs, (Foire Internationale d'Art Contemperain's outdoor program of architectural projects, sculptures, performances, and sound pieces that runs concurrently to the fair) held in the Tuileries Garden where it would have been displayed nearby a playground and instead the work was displayed by the Centre Georges Pompidou in the front square outside of that art institution for a simultaneous run.
