= Alain Pasquier =

French art historian

Alain Pasquier (born 1 August 1942) is a French art historian specialising in ancient Greek art, museography and conservation.

== Biography ==
Former student of the École Normale Supérieure (graduated 1962) and successful candidate of the Agrégation de lettres classiques (1966), Pasquier became a student of the French School at Athens from 1971 to 1974. After graduating, he became a curator at the Department of Greek, Roman and Etruscan Antiquities at the Louvre Museum. In 1984, he was nominated head curator and then, in 1988, the general inspector of the Musées de France (a set of nationally funded museums). He directed the Department of Greek, Roman and Etruscan Antiquities from 1999 to 2007. Jean-Luc Martinez succeeded him.

Since 1974, he has been a professor of Greek archeology, in charge of Ancient Greek sculpture, at the École du Louvre. Since 1995, he has also provided classes in ancient Greek pottery at the École Normale Supérieure. In 2003, he was named a member of the Académie des Inscriptions et Belles-Lettres.

In 2007, along with Jean-Luc Martinez, he organized the Praxitèle exhibit at the Louvre .

== Works ==
- with Jean-Luc Martinez (editors), Praxitèle, catalogue of the exhibition at the Louvre, March 23 - June 18, 2007, published by Louvre & Somogy, 2007.
- Tanagra. Myth and archeology, edition of the Réunion des Musées nationaux, 2003.
- with Bernard Holtzmann, History of Antique Art : Greek Art, collection « Manuels de l'École du Louvre », published by the École du Louvre and the Documentation Française et la Réunion des musées nationaux, 1998.
- The Louvre : Greek, Etruscan and Roman Antiques, Scala, 1998.
- The Venus de Milo et the Aphrodites of the Louvre, published by la Réunion des Musées nationaux, 1991.
