= Jessica Dunn =

Jessica Dunn may refer to:

- Jessica "Jess" Dunn, a character in the Disney Channel TV series Secrets of Sulphur Springs
- Jessica Dunn, resident of Indianapolis Island in 2010 with Michael Runge
- Jessica Dunn, co-producer of the 2019 Christian drama film Breakthrough
- Jessica Dunn, choreographer of the play Curie, Curie
