= Indianapolis Island =

Artwork by Andrea Zittel

- Artist: Andrea Zittel
- Year: 2010
- Dimensions: 300 cm × 610 cm × 610 cm (120 in × 240 in × 240 in)
- Location: Indianapolis Museum of Art; Indianapolis; 39°49′47.9″N 86°11′22.5″W
- Owner: Andrea Zittel and Andrea Rosen Gallery

Indianapolis Island is a public artwork by American artist Andrea Zittel, located in the Virginia B. Fairbanks Art & Nature Park, in Indianapolis, Indiana, United States. The artwork consists of an inhabitable, white fiberglass structure that is mounted onto a floating dock system and installed in the park's lake. Each summer season it is occupied by resident(s) who can choose to modify the island's structure and interior design according to their own individual needs.

== Description ==
The artwork is in the form of an organic, rounded pod structure that is approximately 20' in length and has a domed roof. The structure is made from expanded polystyrene foam, which is then coated with a fiberglass-resin matrix and a white Gelcoat mixture. After the Gelcoat cures, it functions as a protective shell for the initial foam layers as well as the interior living space. The artwork is complete with a wooden door, mounted with its own knob and lock hardware. The structure contains a circular front deck area where the fiberglass slopes at an angle, creating a built-in seating area. There is a rowboat that is brought out to the lake's shore seasonally to provide transportation to and from the island for the current resident(s) and his or her visitors.

The objects contained within the living space are in constant flux, in congruence with the transient nature of its inhabitants, who are seasonal, temporary residents of the island. Indianapolis Island is installed in the park's 35-acre (14 ha) lake. It is floated on a permanent dock structure that is anchored by two concrete blocks from the shoreline.

== Historical information ==
Andrea Zittel, and her A-Z Enterprise, focus on designing and fabricating artwork and installations that draw their inspiration from modern design aesthetics and functional living spaces. Zittel has been exploring the concept of creating habitable islands for years and her artwork, Indianapolis Island, correlates with her ongoing theme of blurring the lines between life and art. The artist anticipates the installation being used as a living space inhabited by temporary residents who will then modify the space according to their own individual needs. As a result, the island is capable of constantly morphing and evolving into a different space, both physically and conceptually. Andrea Zittel commented on the concept of Indianapolis Island in saying,

The idea of an island appeals to me as representation of many of the values that we strive for in our 21st-century culture: individualism, independence, autonomy, and self-sufficiency. Yet at the same time, these are the same desires that isolate us and lessen collective social and political power. I am fascinated at how the things that set us free are also the same things that oppress us; you could say that the concept of the deserted island is both our greatest fantasy and our greatest fear.

=== Island residency ===
- Give and Take, 2010, Jessica Dunn and Michael Runge.

The residency completed by Dunn and Runge focused on the interaction and exchanges between island dweller and visitor. Their mission was to embrace the "give and take" nature of the artwork and reflect the concept of adaptation and evolution within their own personal experiences as well as their interaction with the public. During Dunn and Runge's stay on the island, the public was able to access and share their experiences through a wide spectrum of interactions. These experiences included personal Island visits, Island trades, floating lectures, floating messages, and communication through blogging.

- No Swimming, 2011, Katherine Ball.

Ball's residency focused on bringing awareness to the water quality of the 100 Acres lake and included developing a system that utilizes the filtering properties of mushrooms that may help reduce the level of contaminates and E. coli bacteria in the water. Her approach employed mycofilters constructed from burlap, wood chips, and mushroom mycelium.

- Indigenous: Out of the Wild, 2012, A. Bitterman.

Bitterman spent six weeks interacting with 100 Acres and its visitors in order to explore the question "What is wild?" Using devices typically found in carefully mediated areas of wilderness like national parks, such as an informational kiosk and viewing stations, Bitterman inserted himself into the habitat and pulled viewers into the artistic experience. Bitterman crafted many methods for viewers to interact with him, such as using his invented lexicon of hand signals (Bitterman remained silent except when wearing a transcendental beaver suit), bringing him food, and tracking him via GPS. His blog, including instructional video, can be found here

- Island Fever, 2013, Rimas K. Simaitis.

During "Island Fever," Simaitis invited park visitors to communicate with the island through an on-shore radio that transmitted signals to Indy Island by way of two smaller, floating satellite islands. These smaller, outlying islands were made from Igloo coolers, and outfitted with an audio system, radio receivers and transmitters, and large keel fins to prevent the islands from tipping over. Simaitis prompted visitors to reflect on cosmic relationships and diplomacy at an onshore phone booth, and to then transmit their messages to Indy Island. On the island Simaitis would operate a ham radio station and transmit visitors messages into space by way of a UHF Microwave transmitter with a tiki torch for an antenna. He also had an HF Transceiver that he used to listen for radio signals around the world. The entire project was solar powered, with the intention of having the electronics become operable only when the sun was out. For the project Simaitis earned his General Class amateur radio license, operated under the call sign KI5LND, and kept a blog which can be found here.

=== Location history ===
This artwork was fabricated by Barnacle Bros: Sculpture & Custom Fabrication, a professional fabrication studio based out of Los Angeles, CA. The company's founder, Alessandro Thompson, and his associates transported the artwork in segments to Indianapolis, IN, and finished its fabrication on site at the IMA along with Zittel, who was also present for this process. The artwork was installed on the floating dock system and launched onto the lake in April 2010, and ready for the park's opening in May 2010.

=== Acquisition ===
Indianapolis Island is currently on temporary loan at the Indianapolis Museum of Art.

== Condition ==
Indianapolis Island is reviewed monthly from the shore to determine any major impact from its lake location and to check for any type of dock failure. The artwork is also periodically examined within close proximity, via rowboat, in order to accurately assess any major defects in the structure. These trips take place seasonally, with more frequent surveys taken place in the months directly preceding a new resident's occupancy. Documentation of the contents within the living space is considered an important component to the artwork and is an ongoing project.

== See also ==
- Team Building (Align)
- Bench Around the Lake
