= The Monument (Atelier Van Lieshout) =

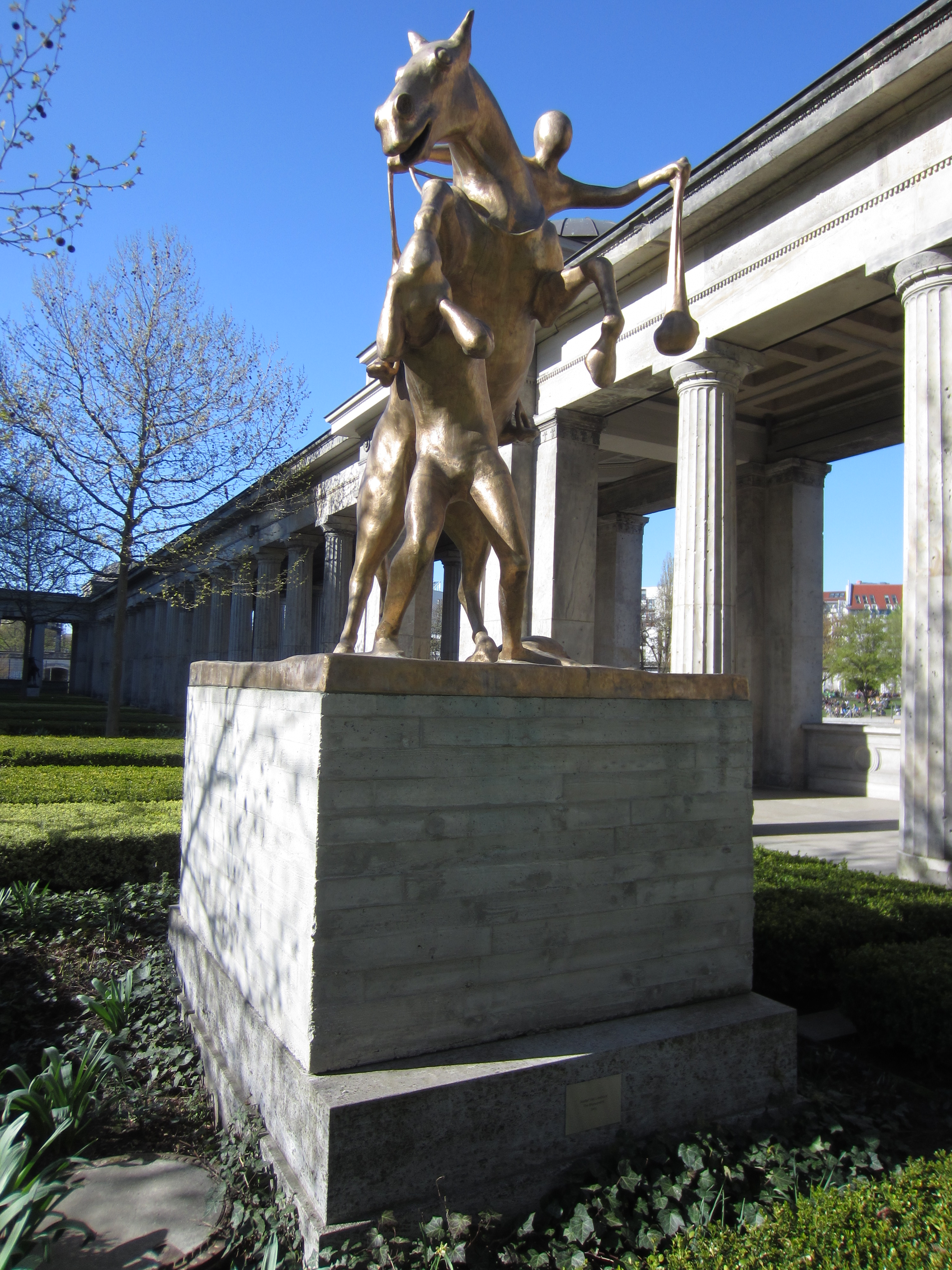
- The sculpture in Berlin in 2016
- Artist: Atelier Van Lieshout
- Year: 2015

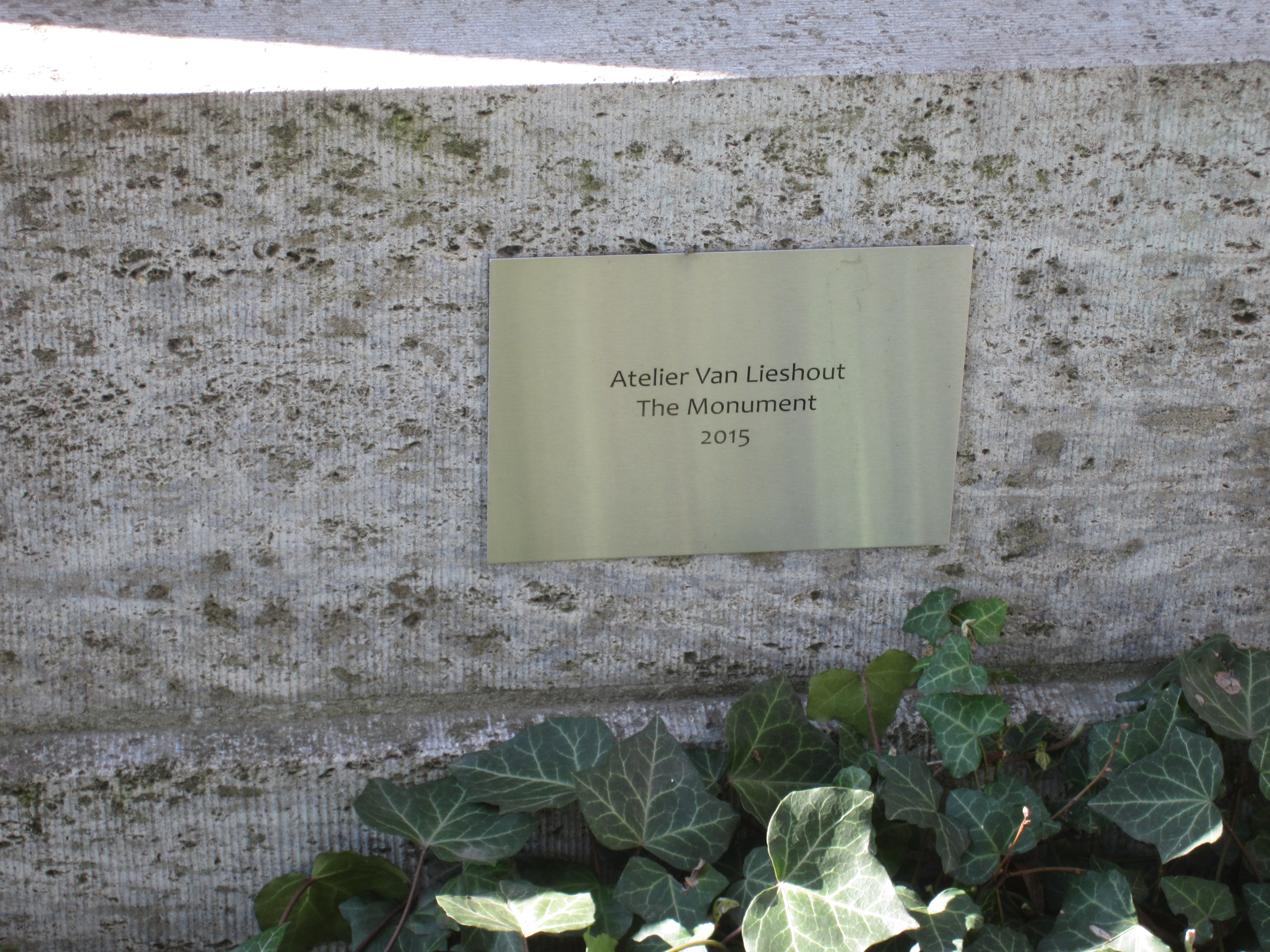
Plaque for the sculpture

The Monument is a 2015 sculpture by Atelier Van Lieshout. It is part of the collection of Alte Nationalgalerie in Berlin, Germany.
