= Type A (artist collective) =

Type A is the collaborative artistic practice of Adam Ames (born 1969) and Andrew Bordwin (born 1964). Since beginning their partnership in 1998, the pair has worked across a wide range of media, including video, performance, installation, photography, sculpture, drawing, and needlepoint. Their early projects explored how men compete, challenge, and play, as well as the resulting social and psychological tensions. Their works have often ranged from psychologically disarming to profoundly absurd.

Over time, their working process has undergone three key shifts. Their projects have increasingly involved larger collaborative circles; they have focused on situating their work outside traditional contemporary art venues; and they have engaged more directly with pressing societal issues, including territory, fear, safety, and authority — both real and perceived.

== Biography ==
Adam Ames was born in New York City. He earned a BA in Communications from the University of Pennsylvania in 1991 and worked as a studio assistant for John Coplans before receiving an MFA in Photography and Related Media from the School of Visual Arts in 1997.

Andrew Bordwin was born in Framingham, Massachusetts. He received a BA in Classical Civilizations and a BFA in Photography from New York University in 1987. After graduation, he trained as a photographer in the style of Ezra Stoller while working for Paul Warchol.

In 1998, Ames asked Bordwin, who had trained in Aikido, to assist with a video project reenacting a high school wrestling match. The resulting piece, Dance, became their first collaboration. Both artists continued their solo practices until 2004, when their joint work became their primary focus. The name “Type A” was given to them by New York gallery owner Sara Meltzer.

== Work ==
Type A's work incorporates elements of humor, absurdity, consequence and one-upmanship to explore "the ways in which men compete, challenge and play, and the resulting social and psychological imbalance."

1998–2002

Dance (1998) was followed by 4 Urban Contests (1998) and 5 Urban Rescues (1998). The former deals directly with competition, documenting performances ranging from races and obstacle course trials to literal pissing contests. The latter focuses more on collaboration, depicting highly dramatized action scenes in which Ames and Bordwin trade off playing the role of victim and savior. This role-playing lead to Twins Project (1998–1999), which explores issues of competition, regression and childhood with custom dolls that were made in their likeness by the My Twinn Company. Outstanding (1999) also incorporates performance and role-playing in an investigation of male bonding, competition and endurance. Ames and Bordwin, dressed in business attire, stand outside a corporate building shaking hands over the course of the thirty-minute video.

2002–2006

In 2002 the focus of Type A's work shifted. Continuing to use their bodies as a medium for performance, pieces such as Mark (2002), Stand (2002–2006) and Push (2004) assess their physical differences and the balance (or imbalance) in their partnership, bringing into question the role of the individual and the collective.

2006–2012

Starting in 2006 Type A began collaborating with groups both inside and outside of the art world. In 2006 they participated in a residency at the Addison Gallery of American Art in Andover, MA. There, they worked with the student body of Phillips Academy to create Cheer (2006). From 2007 to 2009 Type A worked directly with the staff of the Indianapolis Museum of Art (IMA) for Team Building (2008–2010), which resulted in a large scale sculptural installation in the Virginia B. Fairbanks Art & Nature Park entitled Team Building (Align) (2009). Hatje Cantz published a monograph featuring this collaboration with the IMA in September 2009.

From 2009 to 2011 Type A embarked on two projects exploring fear, safety and authority: Barrier (2009) and Trigger (2011). Barrier is a large scale concrete sculpture installation recreating Jersey highway barriers and Trigger explores America's obsession with guns. For Trigger, Type A created a series of photographs which are printed and sold as shooting targets by Law Enforcement Targets Inc. With this project they practice what they call "Interpropriation" or “the act of interjecting themselves and actively participating in cultures outside the art world.”

In 2012 Type A had a solo exhibition titled Guarded at the Museum of Contemporary Art Denver. The exhibition continued their exploration of fear and authority by confronting TSA guidelines.

Type A has also exhibited at The Aldrich Contemporary Art Museum (Ridgefield, CT), The Tang Teaching Museum and Art Gallery (Saratoga Springs, NY), DeCordova Museum and Sculpture Park (Lincoln, MA), The Luckman Fine Art Complex at California State University (Los Angeles, CA), The Walker Art Center (Minneapolis, MN), Art in General (New York, NY), The Addison Gallery of American Art (Andover, MA), The List Visual Arts Center at MIT (Cambridge, MA), Centrum Beeldende Kunst (Rotterdam, The Netherlands), Centro de la Imagen (Mexico City, Mexico), Contemporary Art Center (New Orleans, LA), Institute of Contemporary Art (Palm Beach, FL), UCLA Hammer Museum (Los Angeles, CA) and The Johnson Museum at Cornell University (Ithaca, NY) in addition to many galleries.

Ames and Bordwin teach at Parsons The New School for Design and have been Adjunct Faculty there since 2002.
