= Bench Around the Lake =

Public artwork by Jeppe Hein

- Artist: Jeppe Hein
- Year: 2010
- Type: Powder-coated galvanized steel
- Location: Indianapolis Museum of Art; Indianapolis, Indiana, United States; 39°49′40.5″N 86°11′25.15″W
- Owner: Indianapolis Museum of Art

Bench Around the Lake is a public artwork by Danish artist Jeppe Hein, located in the Virginia B. Fairbanks Art & Nature Park, in Indianapolis, Indiana, United States. The artwork consists of fifteen individually designed yellow interactive bench installations strategically placed throughout the park location. Some of the benches consist of multiple components or sections within one site.

== Description ==
The artwork consists of fifteen bright yellow benches of different shapes, sizes and designs made of powder coated galvanized steel. The benches are placed at specific sites, as decided by the artist, throughout the park which borders the bank of the White River. Hein describes the work as "one long bench that emerges from the ground and then twists, turns, and submerges again in several locations,".

== Historical Information ==
Bench Around the Lake is a re-interpretation of Hein's Modified Social Benches which manipulate the traditional concept of a park bench. With this artwork series Hein hopes to challenge the idea of a bench being a passive object used for sitting, as well as to promote visitors to interact with the artwork in different ways and to explore more secluded or less-used areas of the park. This series of benches also coincided with Hein's May 2010 temporary installation of Distance inside the museum.

=== Location History ===
Working with IMA staff and Indianapolis-based landscape architect Eric Fulford, Hein selected the locations for the benches which are placed throughout the 35-acre park. The benches appear along the beaches on the lake and river, a gully, by fallen trees, the park's Ruth Lilly Visitors Pavilion and other spots throughout the park's many pathways. The artwork was fabricated in Germany and shipped to Indianapolis and installed at the IMA by their Design and Installation crew. The artwork was fully installed by the park's opening in May 2010.

== Artist ==
On creating the artwork Hein states: "Once you start to experience them sequentially, you'll feel that connection between them," encouraging interaction with the artworks by visitors and the appearance of tunneling the benches have within the environment. "They are a tool for communication, and create a kind of social playroom," Hein states, referring to the functional aspects of each bench. He describes one bench as the "kissing bench" due to the sliding factor the bench has, bringing together those who sit upon it regardless of their desire to be close.

== Condition ==
Bench Around the Lake requires regular cleaning of its powder coated galvanized steel surface to discourage the buildup of potentially damaging materials. Instrumental analysis involving the artwork's color and gloss levels has also been recorded.

== See also ==
- Team Building (Align)
- Eden II
