= Funky Bones =

Public artwork by Atelier Van Lieshout

- Artist: Atelier Van Lieshout
- Year: 2010
- Type: sculpture, public art
- Medium: plywood, fiberglass
- Subject: skeleton
- Dimensions: 0.66 m × 12 m × 21 m (2.17 ft × 39 ft × 69 ft)
- Location: Indianapolis Museum of Art; Indianapolis; 39°49′38.78″N 86°11′25.15″W
- Owner: Joep van Lieshout and Tanya Bonakdar Gallery

Funky Bones is a public artwork by Atelier Van Lieshout, a Dutch artist collective led by Joep van Lieshout, located in the Virginia B. Fairbanks Art & Nature Park, which is on the grounds of Newfields in Indianapolis, Indiana, United States. The artwork, primarily made from fiberglass, consists of twenty white and black bone-shaped benches.

== Description ==
Funky Bones is situated in the Meadow region just south of the lake at the Virginia B. Fairbanks Art & Nature Park. It is a site-specific artwork consisting of 20 white bone-shaped benches inscribed with black drawings of bones that together form a large stylized human skeleton. The artwork was constructed primarily from fiberglass, plywood, and concrete. Each bench is a fiberglass shell filled with a lightweight foam material. The fiberglass surface has been impregnated with pigment, carved, and coated in polyester resin. Plywood was used only during the detailing process of the black bone segments and is not visible in the completed artwork. The concrete component for this artwork is not visible but rather serves as a structural aid, anchoring and securing the individual benches into the ground. A standard ready-mix concrete was used for this application.

The skeleton is positioned with its arms spread out horizontally while the legs point straight down. The individual benches range in both length and width, but all are approximately 26 inches in height. The artwork was fabricated in Atelier Van Lieshout's studio in Rotterdam and shipped to the Indianapolis Museum of Art where it was assembled by the design and installation crew.

== Historical information ==
Funky Bones was installed at the Indianapolis Museum of Art in May 2010 and is currently on temporary loan. The artwork arose from many disparate interests of Joep van Lieshout, the founder and head designer of AVL. These include human anatomy and the history of the site. Concerning the original concept and inspiration behind Funky Bones, Joep van Lieshout stated:

I came up with [this] design that is not only a site specific artwork referring to the history of the continent, but also provides a function and will improve the stay of the park's visitors. Even as a child I knew the state Indiana and Indianapolis as an exotic place where the 'Indians' came from and were living, and even though this is not true, it is important for my proposition. Another field of interest is the history of art and especially in early developments of art from primitive and native cultures. In early art forms, techniques and skills were not so developed and the artworks were made in a very basic way, therefore art had a direct relation to the people, its time and environment. Native American art, design, and architecture produced beautiful artifacts, religion, and lifestyle, but after the appearance of the 'more advanced' culture from the east the original inhabitants were moved around and dispersed. The very few things that remained are their cultural heritage and artifacts scattered around. At this time of rapid production and consumption, their primitive lifestyle, close to nature, seems to become a necessary utopia. The dislocated Funky Bone benches installed in the park stand symbolic for the leftovers of their sold culture and the spread of Native Americans over the continent.

In addition to resonating with the location's history, Funky Bones also has the functional purpose of providing an ideal spot for visitors to sit, picnic, lounge, or climb. Joep van Lieshout observed visitors sitting on rocks during visits to the site, and decided to provide them with more comfortable seating arrangements in order to facilitate interaction, both among viewers as well as between viewer and art. This degree of interactivity, and even fun, makes Funky Bones extremely child-friendly.

== Artist ==
Atelier Van Lieshout (AVL) is a multidisciplinary company that operates internationally in the field of contemporary art, design, and architecture. Joep van Lieshout (born 1963), founder of AVL, is a Dutch artist born in Ravenstein, The Netherlands. He received his formal education and training from the Academy of Modern Art in Rotterdam (1980–1985), Ateliers '63 in Haarlem (1985–1987), and from the Villa Arson in Nice, France (1987). Joep van Lieshout formed the AVL studio group in 1995 in Rotterdam, The Netherlands, where the company continues to design and fabricate their widely exhibited works. Atelier Van Lieshout has attained international recognition for objects-based projects that balance on the boundary between art, architecture and design. Recurring themes in the work of AVL include self-sufficiency, power, politics, and the more classical themes of life and death. The name Atelier Van Lieshout emphasizes the fact that, although Joep van Lieshout founded and leads the collective, the work produced stems from the creative impulses of the entire team.

For Funky Bones, AVL's most relevant recurring themes are domestication, politics, complex functioning systems, and the re-contextualization of familiar, domestic objects. The Atelier van Lieshout claims to make no distinction between "real artworks" and "just building something for someone." The studio group focuses on creating artworks whose design principles challenge conventional ideas of utility and functionality by reinventing how the viewer perceives or approaches an object and the environment in which it is placed. This is achieved by the implementation of non-traditional materials and color palettes, odd or unusual subject matter, and through the strategic positioning or locale of the artwork. Funky Bones is impossible to see in its entirety except at a distance, preferably from above. Moving close enough to actually interact with it produces an entirely different perspective.

== Condition ==
In general, the bones require regular cleaning in order to maintain their white color. Instrumental analysis involving the artwork's color and gloss levels has been recorded for future reference.

== Reception ==
In the 2012 novel The Fault in Our Stars, by Indianapolis-based author John Green, the sculpture is the location of a romantic picnic, having been picked by one of the characters as being the most Dutch place in Indianapolis. Funky Bones was recreated in Pittsburgh, Pennsylvania for the 2014 film adaptation. The replica was built by set designers, with help from the artist and Sarah Urist Green, wife of John Green, and former Curator of Contemporary Art at the Indianapolis Museum of Art. In 2017, PopSugar named Funky Bones to its list of "22 Public Works of Art You Have to Visit in Your Lifetime".

== See also ==
- List of outdoor artworks at the Indianapolis Museum of Art
