= Alfredo Jaar =

Chilean-born artist, architect, photographer and filmmaker

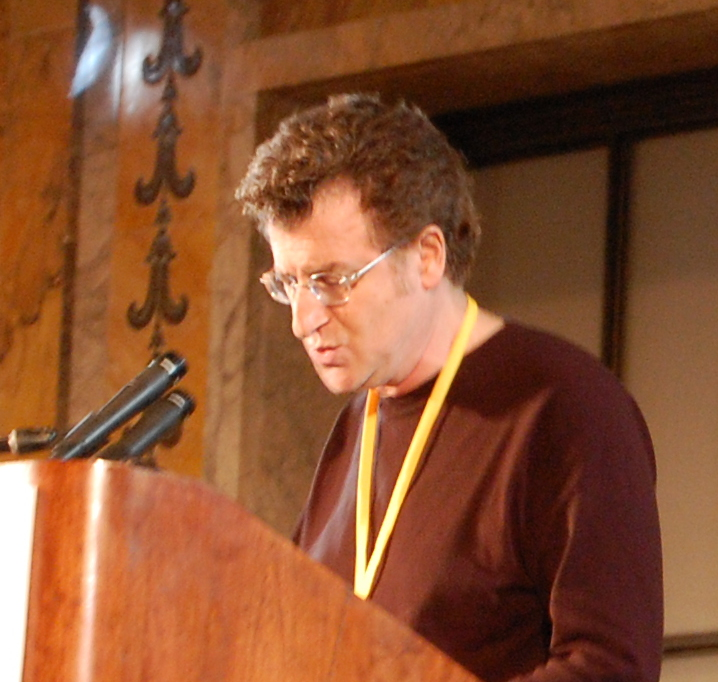
- Jaar in 2009
- Born: 1956 (age 69–70); Santiago de Chile, Chile
- Known for: Conceptual art, Installation art
- Notable work: The Rwanda Project, The Skoghall Konsthall, Studies on Happiness
- Awards: Guggenheim Fellowship (1985), National Prize for Plastic Arts (Chile) (2013), Hasselblad Award (2020)
- Website: www.alfredojaar.net

Alfredo Jaar (English: /dʒɑːr/; Spanish: [ˈɟʝaɾ]; born 1956) is a Chilean-born artist, architect, photographer and filmmaker who lives and works in Lisbon, Portugal. He is mostly known as an installation artist, often incorporating photography and covering socio-political issues and war—the best known perhaps being the 6-year-long The Rwanda Project about the 1994 Rwandan genocide. He has also made numerous public intervention works, like The Skoghall Konsthall one-day paper museum in Sweden, an early electronic billboard intervention A Logo For America, and The Cloud, a performance project on both sides of the Mexico-USA border. He has been featured on Art:21. He won the Hasselblad Award for 2020.

He is the father of musician and composer Nicolas Jaar.

== Early life ==
Jaar was born in 1956 in Santiago de Chile. From age 5 to 16, he lived in Martinique before moving back to Chile. In 1982, after graduating from university, he moved to New York City and took a job with the architect James Wines and his firm SITE. He lived and maintained a studio in New York from 1982 until 2025, when he moved to Lisbon.

== Work ==
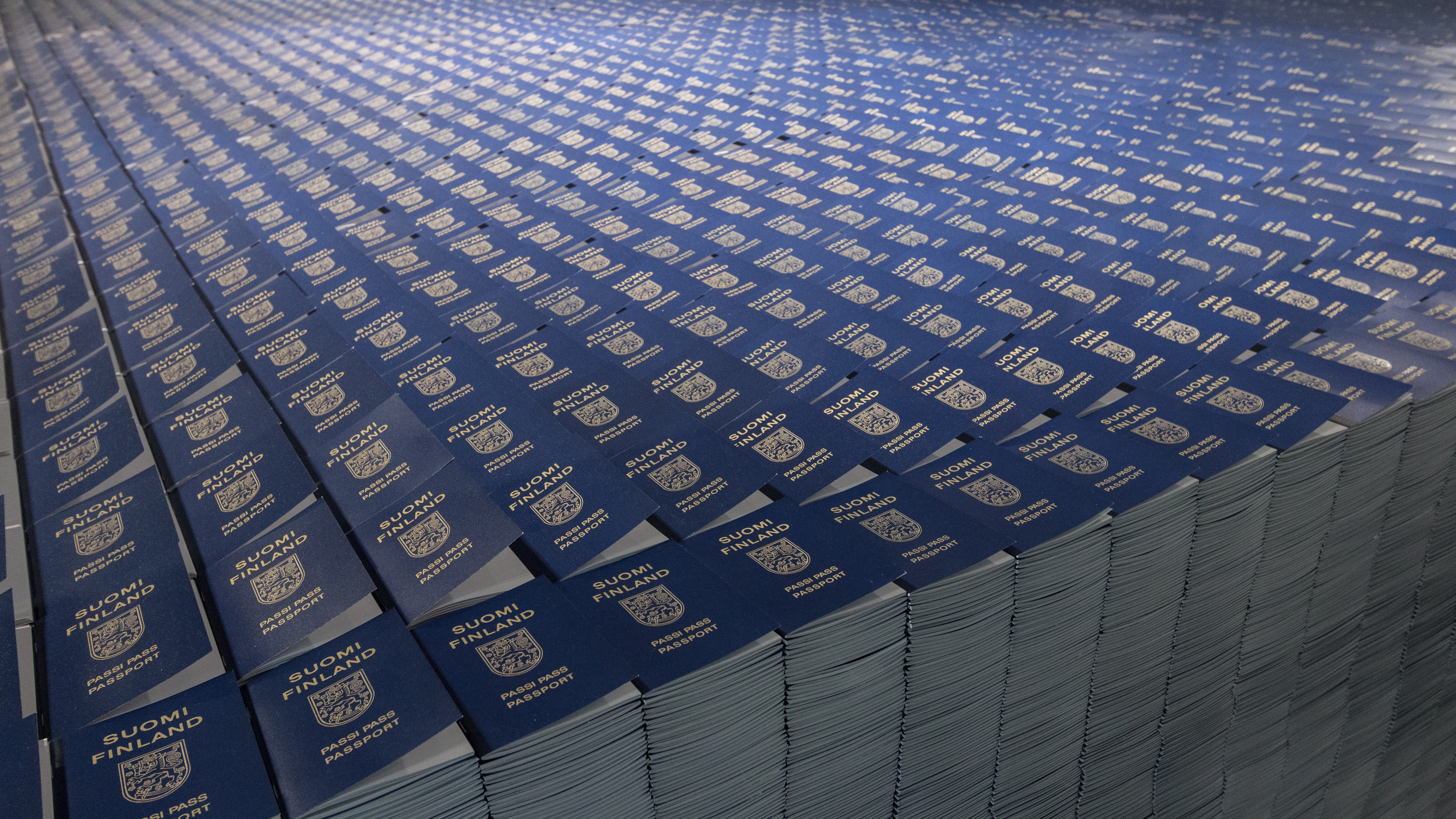
One Million Finnish Passports, Kiasma Museum exhibition, 2014

Jaar's art is usually politically motivated, with strategies of representation of real events, the faces of war or the globalized world, and sometimes with a certain level of viewer participation (in the case of many public interventions and performances). One of his famous examples, the 1987 provocative 45-second animated installation A Logo for America, challenges the patriotic spectators at Times Square about American identity by using the language of commercial advertising.

"There's this huge gap between reality and its possible representations. And that gap is impossible to close. So as artists, we must try different strategies for representation. [...] [A] process of identification is fundamental to create empathy, to create solidarity, to create intellectual involvement."

His 2010 three-channel video installation We Wish To Inform You We Didn't Know covers the 1994 Rwandan Genocide and then-President Bill Clinton's "apology" four years afterwards.

== Exhibitions ==
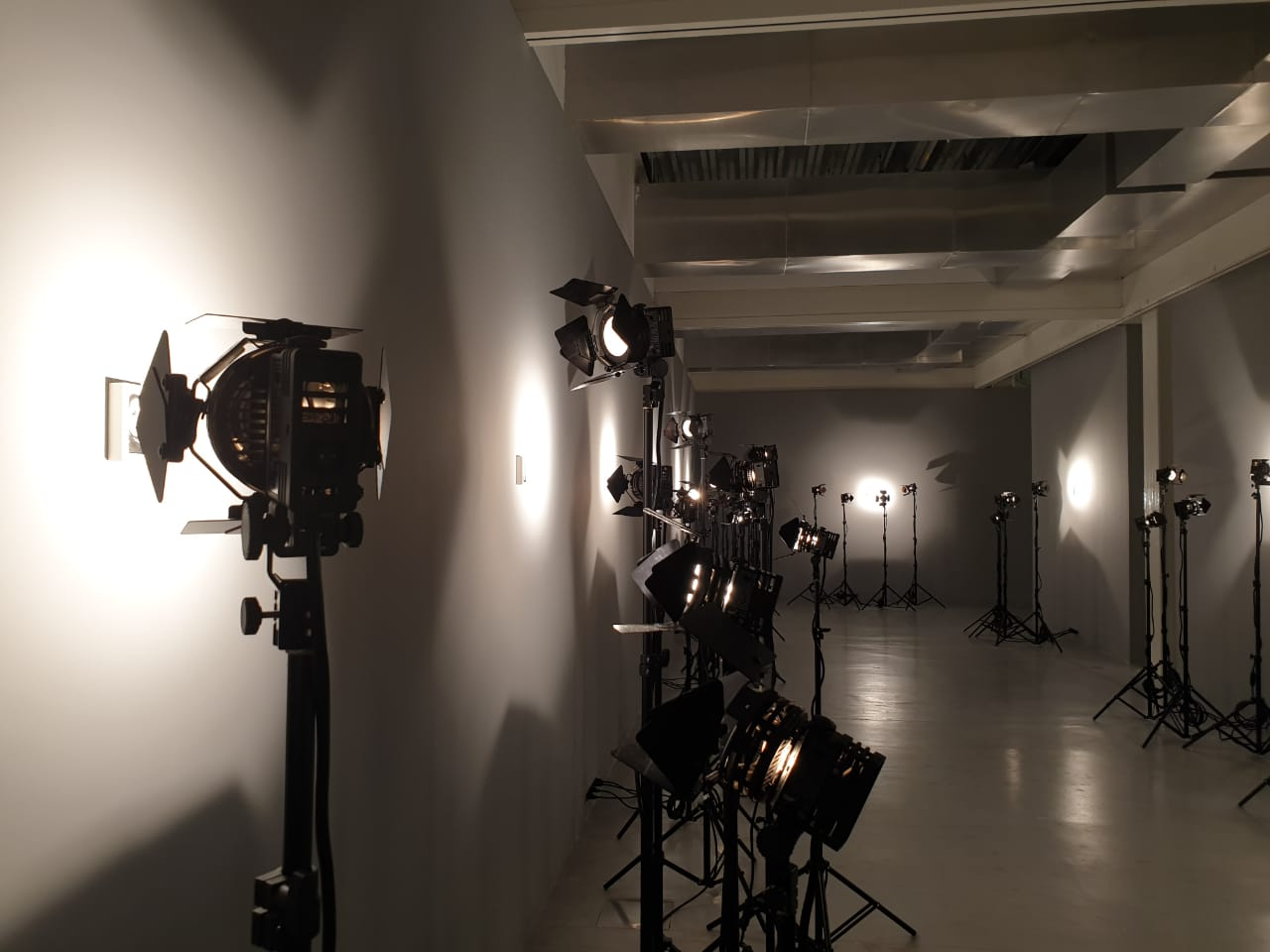
Women at Sharjah Biennale, 2019

His work has been shown extensively around the world, notably in the Biennales of Venice (1986, 2007), São Paulo (1987, 1989, 2010, 2021), Istanbul (1995), Kwangju (1995, 2000), Johannesburg (1997), Seville (2006), the Whitney Biennial (2022), and Every Sound Is a Shape of Time, Pérez Art Museum Miami (2024).

His work, Park of the Laments was part of the Virginia B. Fairbanks Art & Nature Park which opened in 2010 at the Indianapolis Museum of Art. For the "Revolution vs Revolution" exhibition held at the Beirut Art Center, he produced a new version of his photographic project 1968.

Important individual exhibitions include the New Museum of Contemporary Art, New York (1992); Whitechapel Gallery, London (1992); Museum of Contemporary Art, Chicago (1992); Moderna Museet, Stockholm (1994); Museum of Contemporary Art of Rome (2005); Fundación Telefónica, Santiago (2006); Musée des Beaux Arts, Lausanne (2007); the South London Gallery in 2008.; and Yorkshire Sculpture Park, Wakefield UK (2018).

Jaar represented Chile at the 2013 Venice Biennale.

One of his two solo exhibitions was shown in Hong Kong as part of the "Hong Kong's Migrant Domestic Workers Project" at Para Site in the exhibition "Afterwork." Hundreds of thousands of Vietnamese boat people sought refuge in British Hong Kong after the Vietnam War ended in the late 1970s and continued until the early 1990s.

In 2022, Jaar presented a major video installation titled 06.01.2020 at the Whitney Biennial, New York, commenting on the Black Lives Matter protests in 2020 in Washington DC.

Jaar's work was featured in the exhibition This Is America: Selections from PAMM's Collection, at the Pérez Art Museum Miami in 2026. The show, which drawn from the museum collection, took a critical approach to responded to the United States 250th anniversary. Alfredo Jaar's work was included alongside fellow artists such as Judy Chicago, Thomas Hirschhorn, Howardena Pindell, and Coco Fusco, among many others.

== Collections (selection) ==
His work can be found in the permanent collections of art museums around the Americas, Europe, and Asia, such as the Pérez Art Museum Miami, Centre Georges Pompidou, and the Museum of Modern Art, New York, among others.

== Awards ==
- 1985: Guggenheim Fellowship from the John Simon Guggenheim Memorial Foundation
- 2000: MacArthur Fellow
- 2006: Honorary Doctor of Fine Arts, School of the Art Institute of Chicago, USA
- 2011: Honorary Doctor of Fine Arts, SUNY Purchase, New York, USA
- 2013: National Prize for Plastic Arts (Chile)
- 2018: Hiroshima Art Prize
- 2020: Hasselblad Award, Gothenburg, Sweden
- 2022: Mercosur Konex Award, Buenos Aires, Argentina
- 2024: Mediterranean Albert Camus Prize, Menorca, Spain
- 2025: Prix Pictet Award for Photography and Sustainability

=== Memberships ===
- 2026 Member of the Academy of Arts, Berlin

== Other activities ==
Jaar was part of the jury that selected Ayoung Kim for the 2025 LG Guggenheim Award, an international art prize established as part of a long-term global partnership between LG Group and the Solomon R. Guggenheim Museum to recognize groundbreaking artists in technology-based art.

== Family ==
Alfredo's son Nicolas Jaar is a musician and composer.

== General references ==
- Alfredo Jaar, Lorenzo Fusi, TAC Collection, Exòrma Ed., Italian/English, May 2012
- Stefan Jonsson, 1989: Alfredo Jaar, They Loved It So Much, the Revolution, in A brief history of the masses: three revolutions, New York: Columbia University Press, 2008, pp. 119 ff.
- Jaar, Alfredo, Mary J. Jacob, and Nancy Princenthal. Alfredo Jaar: The Fire This Time : Public Interventions 1979-2005. Milano: Charta, 2005. Print. Alfredo Jaar: the fire this time : public interventions 1979-2005
- Jaar, Alfredo, and Willie A. Drake. Alfredo Jaar: Geography=war. Richmond, VA: Anderson Gallery, Virginia Commonwealth University, 1991. Print. Alfredo Jaar: geography=war
- Jaar, Alfredo. Let There Be Light: The Rwanda Project 1994 – 1998, Barcelona: Actar, 1998. Print.
- Solomon-Godeau, Abigail. ‘Lament of the Images: Alfredo Jaar and the Ethics of Representation’ in Aperture, Issue 181, pp 36–48
