= Eden II =

2010 public artwork by Tea Mäkipää

- Artist: Tea Mäkipää
- Year: 2010
- Type: Mixed media installation
- Dimensions: 7.6 m × 2.4 m × 15 m (25 ft × 8 ft × 48 ft)
- Location: Indianapolis Museum of Art; Indianapolis, IN; 39°49′42″N 86°11′31″W

Eden II is a public artwork by the Finnish artist Tea Mäkipää, located on the grounds of the Indianapolis Museum of Art in Indianapolis, Indiana, United States. It is a mixed-media installation, consisting of a derelict ship on the lake and a guardhouse and its equipment on the shore. It was commissioned in 2010 by the Indianapolis Museum of Art's Virginia B. Fairbanks Art & Nature Park.

== Description ==
Eden II consists of a ship made of steel, dock floats, concrete, paint, anchors, steel cable and various other mixed media, plus a guard house constructed with plywood and galvanized steel, containing LCD monitors, security cameras, a media player and an audio amplifier. The work combines real and fictional elements: the speakers play both local weather forecasts and dispatches from imaginary guards (whose voices were provided by IMA security staff), while the monitors display footage from the security camera trained on the viewer as well as simulated imagery from within the ship. It is intended as a commentary on global warming, with the refugees on board the ship driven out by "rising sea levels and the ecological impact of climate change".

== Construction ==
Although the original plan was to use a pre-existing vessel, in the end Mäkipää opted to "construct a floating structure that resembles a ship" with the assistance of the local engineering company Silver Creek Engineering, Inc. A steel frame gives the ship the necessary strength to withstand waves, wind, snow and ice. A system of pontoons and weights keep it afloat and upright, and it is moored in place with weighted anchor lines. It was constructed both onsite and at the Herron School of Art & Design by Mäkipää, the Icelandic artist Halldúr Úlfarsson, Herron students, structural engineers from Silver Creek, and the IMA Design and Installation Crew. The museum's director at the time, Maxwell Anderson, has theorized that, in spite of the effort that went into constructing it, the ship will be slowly demolished by its aquatic environment, and he sees no reason to stop it: "We can imagine leaving Tea’s piece to become a shipwreck. Why not just let it do what it needs to do?"

== Artist ==
This artwork is typical of Mäkipää in its examination of human beings and their ability to affect their environment. Much of her work is devoted to highlighting "environmental change and the role of humans in the destruction and possible preservation of the planet. ... [S]he treats humans as a unique animal species" with a unique ability to reshape the natural world.

== See also ==
- List of outdoor artworks at the Indianapolis Museum of Art
