= Tea Mäkipää =

Finnish artist

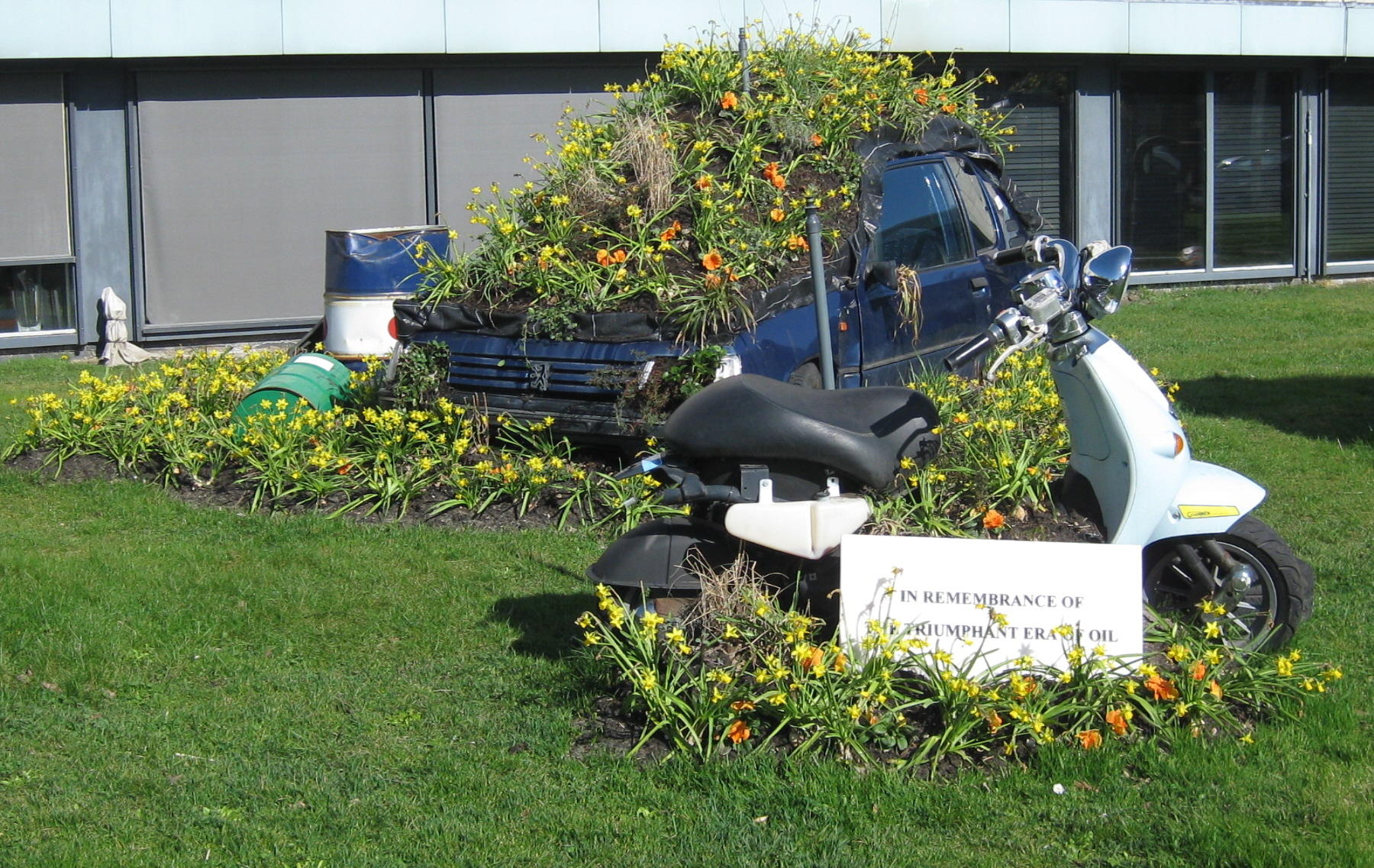
Part of the installation "Petrol Engine Memorial Park" at the Gemeentemuseum Den Haag 2013

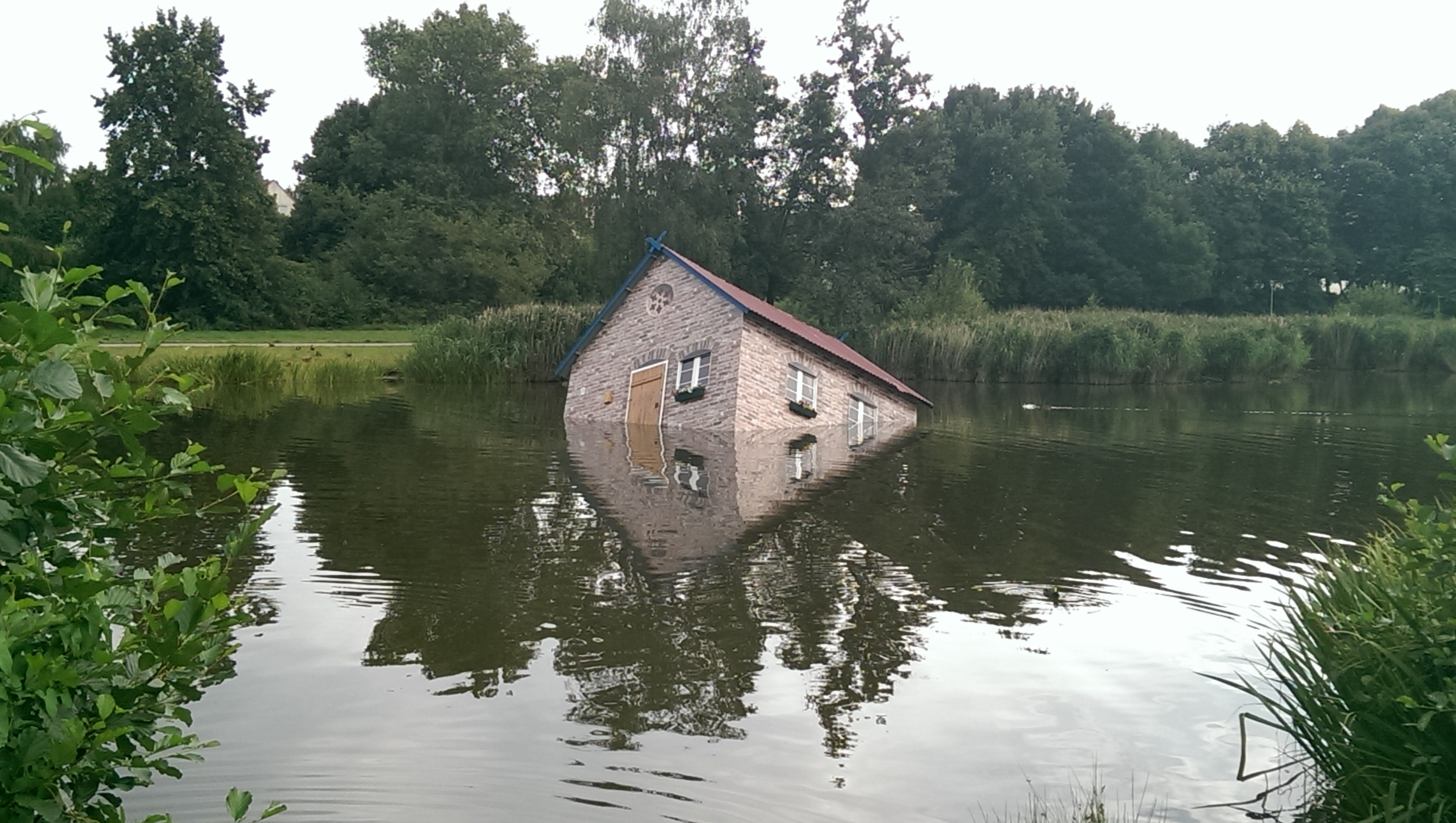
Tea Mäkipää's work in Rostock (Germany) during Hanse Sail 2014

Tea Mäkipää (born 1973) is a Finnish artist known for her installations, architectural works and videos. She earned a BA in Fine Art, from the Academy of Fine Arts (Finland), Helsinki and an MA from the Royal College of Art in London. Her works are in the collections of Helsinki Art Museum, Helsinki; the Collection Pentti Kouri; City of Helsinki, the State of Finland Central Archive of Art, Kiasma; Museum of Contemporary Art, Helsinki; Akademie Schloss Solitude, Stuttgart (Germany); Sammlung Federkiel, Leipzig (Germany). Her works often deal with ecological disaster, depicting a world afterwards, such as raised sea levels or the end of oil.

Mäkipää lives and works in Weimar, Germany.

== Solo exhibitions ==
- 2007 Motocalypse Now, Kunstverein Langenhagen, Hannover, Germany
- 2006 Catwalk, Kunstlerhaus Bethanien, Berlin
- 2005 Sexgod, Galleri21, Malmö, Sweden
- 2004 ASolitude, Akademie Schloss Solitude, Stuttgart, Germany
