= Jean-Luc Martinez =

Director of Musée du Louvre, a museum in Paris, France

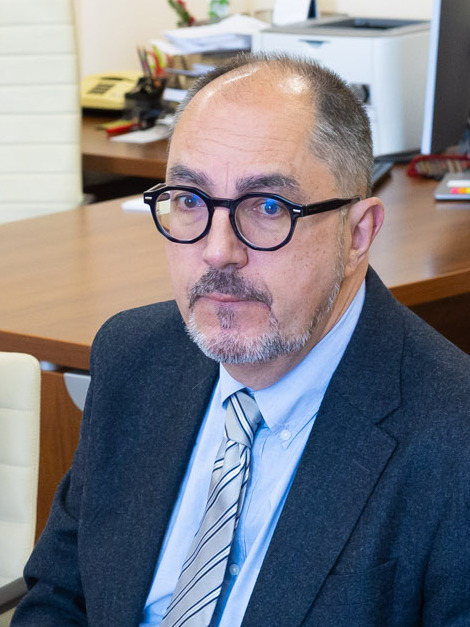
Martinez in 2025

Jean-Luc Martinez (born 22 March 1964) is a French archaeologist and art historian specialising in ancient Greek sculpture. Currently serving as a thematic ambassador responsible for international co-operation in the field of heritage, he was previously the president-director of the Louvre Museum from 2013 to 2021.

== Biography ==
=== Early life and education ===
The son of a concierge and a postman, Martinez studied at the Pablo-Picasso High School in Fontenay-sous-Bois. He graduated from the École du Louvre and obtained his agrégation in history in 1989. From 1993 to 1996 he was a member of the French School at Athens, where he conducted excavations at Delos and Delphi. Martinez taught archaeology at the Catholic Institute of Paris and later at the University of Paris X-Nanterre. In 1997 he became Chief Curator of Greek antiquities at the Louvre and taught at the École du Louvre. By a decree on 4 September 2007, he was formally integrated into the heritage curators' body effective from 1 June 2007.

From 2007 to 2013 Martinez led the Department of Greek, Etruscan, and Roman Antiquities at the Louvre.

He designed the "Galerie du Temps" at the Louvre-Lens, inaugurated in 2012.

=== Presidency of the Louvre Museum ===
In April 2013 Martinez was appointed President-Director of the Louvre, succeeding Henri Loyrette. In 2018 he was reappointed for a second term.

==== Exhibitions and Museum Attendance ====
During his tenure, the number of exhibitions decreased, though some attracted large crowds, such as the Johannes Vermeer exhibition and the 2019-2020 Leonardo da Vinci exhibition, which drew nearly 1.1 million visitors, a record in the museum's history. After the November 2015 terrorist attacks, visitor numbers declined, prompting enhanced security measures. However, in 2018 the Louvre achieved a historic attendance record, surpassing 10 million visitors.

==== Achievements ====
Martinez oversaw the modernisation of the reception infrastructure under the Pyramid, including ticketing, baggage handling and group reception areas. More than half of the Louvre's rooms, approximately 34,000 square metres, were renovated between 2013 and 2021. Additional modernisations included online reservations with timed slots, Wi-Fi installation, improved signage translations, free online access to collections, and the restoration and re-vegetation of the Tuileries Garden.

Other projects initiated during his term include the "Petite Galerie" dedicated to the history of art, the "Studio" for training and welcoming priority audiences, and free evening openings on the first Saturday of each month.

The Louvre Abu Dhabi, inaugurated on 8 November 2017, was completed under his leadership. During its opening President Emmanuel Macron described it as the "largest cultural co-operation project of France abroad."

Martinez decided to relocate the museum's reserves to Liévin to protect them from potential flooding caused by a Seine river flood. The conservation centre in Liévin, designed by Richard Rogers' firm, was inaugurated in October 2019 and houses 250,000 works from the Louvre.

=== Post-Louvre career ===
After an unsuccessful bid for a third term in 2021, Martinez was succeeded by Laurence des Cars. In 2021 he was appointed a thematic ambassador for international cooperation in heritage. In 2022 his duties related to combating the trafficking of cultural goods were provisionally removed by the government.

=== Reports to french presidents ===
Martinez authored several reports. Following the destruction of heritage sites in Syria and Iraq, he presented a report titled "Fifty French Proposals to Protect Humanity's Heritage" to President François Hollande in November 2015. This report led to the creation of the International Alliance for the Protection of Heritage in Conflict Areas (ALIPH).

In response to Macron's 2017 speech in Ouagadougou in Burkina Faso and the restitution of 26 royal treasures to Benin, Martinez was commissioned to write a report on restitution. His report "Shared Heritage: Universality, Restitution, and the Circulation of Artworks – Towards a French Legislation and Doctrine on 'Restitution Criteria' for Cultural Goods" was submitted in April 2023. This report inspired several legislative texts, including the law on the restitution of looted cultural goods during the Holocaust, promulgated on 22 July 2023, and the law on the restitution of human remains in public collections, promulgated on 26 December 2023.

== Antiquities Trafficking Case ==
On 23 May 2022 Martinez was taken into custody as part of an antiquities trafficking case and was later indicted for "money laundering and complicity in organised fraud." He was accused of failing to exercise due diligence concerning inconsistencies identified later in the certificates accompanying a pink granite stele inscribed with Tutankhamun's name, exhibited at the Louvre Abu Dhabi, and four other objects.

The antiquities expert Christophe Kunicki, who proposed the Tutankhamun stele to the Louvre Abu Dhabi acquisition committee in 2016, was allegedly involved in selling the golden sarcophagus of the priest Nedjemankh to the Metropolitan Museum of Art in New York City, which was returned to Egypt in 2019 after being stolen in 2011 during the Hosni Mubarak uprising. The Louvre Abu Dhabi is a civil party in the case.

In November 2022 the Attorney General of the Paris Court of Appeal called for the annulment of Martinez's indictment. The indictment was upheld on 3 February 2023 by the Court of Appeal and subsequently by the Court of Cassation, despite a request for annulment from the prosecution.

Martinez firmly contests his indictment and claims his innocence, denying responsibility for the actions in question.

He highlights the organisational limitations of the system, including the structure responsible for controls, France Museums Agency. He asserts that verifying the authenticity of provenance documents for artworks is not within his remit and criticises the lack of resources available to museum directors for this purpose. He notes that the fake stamps were only identified after a lengthy police investigation in the US, triggered by the MET case.

== Publications ==
- 2000: Beau comme l’Antique, RMN
- 2000: La Dame d'Auxerre, RMN
- 2001: La Corè de Samos with Jacqueline de Romilly and Jacques Lacarrière, Somogy
- 2001: Les Dieux grecs, small illustrated dictionary, RMN
- 2004: Les Antiques du Louvre. A History of Taste from Henri IV to Napoleon I, Fayard
- 2004: Les Antiques du musée Napoléon. Illustrated and commented edition of volumes V and VI of the 1810 Louvre inventory, RMN, "Notes and Documents" collection
- 2007: with Alain Pasquier: 100 Chefs-d'œuvre de la sculpture grecque au Louvre, Somogy
- 2007: La Grèce classique au Louvre: masterpieces from the 5th and 4th centuries BC, Tokyo June 17-August 20, Kyoto September 5-November 5, Nippon Television Network edition
- 2007: with Alain Pasquier: Praxitèle. Exhibition catalog at the Louvre, March 23-June 18, 2007, editions of the Louvre & Somogy
- 2007: Smyrna/Izmir, portrait of a city through French collections, Izmir October 9-November 30, 2006, French Cultural Center of Izmir
- 2009: with Isabelle Hasselin Rous and Ludovic Laugier: Izmir-Smyrne: Discovery of an Ancient City, Somogy
- 2010: La Grèce au Louvre, Somogy
- 2015: Fifty French Proposals to Protect Humanity's Heritage (report submitted to the President of the Republic)
- 2021: Paris-Athènes Naissance de la Grèce moderne 1675-1919. Exhibition catalog at the Louvre from September 30, 2021, to February 7, 2022, editions of the Louvre & Hazan
- 2021: Collective, Un âge d'or du marbre - La sculpture en pierre à Delphes dans l'Antiquité, edited by the French School of Athens

== Decorations ==
- Chevalier of the Legion of Honour (2015)
- Commander of the Order of Arts and Letters, 2021 (Officer in 2011)
- Golden Century with Collar (Bulgaria; 2015)
- Commander of the Order of Honour (Greece; 2021)
