= Team Building (Align) =

Public artwork by artist collective Type A

- Artist: Type A
- Year: 2010
- Dimensions: 7.6 m × 9.1 m × 9.1 m (25 ft × 30 ft × 30 ft)
- Location: Indianapolis Museum of Art; Indianapolis, Indiana; 39°49′36″N 86°11′21″W

Team Building (Align) is a public artwork by American artist collective Type A. It was commissioned by the Indianapolis Museum of Art as part of Virginia B. Fairbanks Art & Nature Park. It consists of two 30 feet (9.1 m) aluminum rings suspending in midair, aligned such that their shadows merge at noon on the summer solstice.

== Description ==
Team Building (Align) consists of two 30' aluminum rings suspended with steel cables from telephone poles. They are carefully oriented so that their two shadows merge into one at noon on the summer solstice.

== Creation ==
This work was created by Type A in collaboration with a team of IMA staff from nearly every department (security, curatorial, grounds, conservation, etc.), a variety chosen to serve as a microcosm of Indianapolis. This is the reason for the first half of the artwork's title: Type A wished to examine the subject of team-building, now so prevalent in popular culture. Type A frequently described the artwork as a "gesture" rather than a sculpture, as their primary interest was the examination of the team members' engagement with both one another and the artistic process. For a year, beginning in the spring of 2007, the team would meet for five-day rope course workshops of the sort favored for corporate retreats. These were held at the High 5 Adventure Learning Center in Brattleboro, Vermont.

One of the members of the team was Lisa Freiman, chairwoman of the contemporary art department of the IMA. Her focus on collaborative art, dating back to her doctoral dissertation, has been cited as a main reason for the preponderance of artistic duos and collectives featured at 100 Acres. Freiman's interest in the give-and-take between artist and curator was tested by degree of collaboration experienced during the creation of Team Building (Align), which resulted in a "fraught" relationship.

Even though the team was focused on the process rather than the result, Type A still had to design a physical sculpture representing that process in order to fulfill the IMA's commission. The original plan was a 40' climbing tower with handholds shaped from casts of the teammates' hands, suspended in midair so as to be inaccessible and absurd. However, the team disliked this idea, as they had used ropes rather than climbing towers in their sessions, and furthermore did not appreciate the implication that their work was useless or silly. In response to this, Type A designed a second sculpture, the one that was ultimately created. This design was inspired by many factors, such as the emotional resonance of a circle; the concept of two bodies joining to form a third, distinct entity without losing their own identities; and a specific teamwork exercise called the Bull Ring Initiative involving a tennis ball, two rings, and the careful application of tension to a number of cords. The team was much more enthusiastic about this concept. They selected the summer solstice as the appropriate date for the alignment in order to coincide with the opening of 100 Acres. Type A determined the correct orientation of the rings in consultation with Prof. Brian Murphy from the Holcomb Observatory and Planetarium of Butler University. The 30' diameter was based on the size of the circle produced by all the teammates holding hands.

The actual construction of the sculpture was handled by the local company Indianapolis Fabrications. iFab roll formed 3" diameter aluminum tubing to form the 30' diameter rings, then covered the rings with a thin aluminum plate, which was then ground and sanded smooth. iFab was also responsible for the placement of the three 55' telephone poles and the rigging of the rings according to Prof. Murphy's specifications.

== Artist ==
Type A is an artist collective consisting of the New York-based duo Adam Ames and Andrew Bordwin. Their partnership began in 1998 with a five-minute video of the two of them wrestling, entitled Dance. Since then, they have created many artworks in a variety of media, including videos, photographs, sculptures, and drawings. Their work examines masculinity, identity, intimacy, power, individuality, and collaboration, and frequently stars themselves. Humor and absurdity also often play a large role in their art. A major turning point in the history of the collective occurred in 2006 when the Addison Gallery of American Art of the Phillips Academy in Andover, Massachusetts offered them residency. That enabled to them to recruit others to participate in their artworks, although they maintained strict control of the process. The logical extension of that experience was the team-based process that led to Team Building (Align).

== See also ==
- List of outdoor artworks at the Indianapolis Museum of Art
