= List of public art in Indianapolis =

This is a list of public art in Indianapolis organized by neighborhoods in the city.

This list applies only to works of public art accessible in an outdoor public space. For example, this does not include artwork visible inside a museum.

Most of the works mentioned are sculptures. When this is not the case (i.e. sound installation, for example) it is stated next to the title.

== Brendonwood ==
Title	Artist	Year	Location/GPS Coordinates	Material	Dimensions	Owner	Image
Mary		1963	Cathedral High School 39°51′7″N 86°4′50″W	Concrete	5 ft. × 20 in. × 16 in.	Cathedral High School	
Our Lady of Fatima	Enrico Pandolfine Group	1966	Fatima Retreat House 39°51′16″N 86°4′40″W	Bianco Derville marble	6 ft. × 28 in. × 16 in.	Fatima Retreat House	

== Broad Ripple ==
Title	Artist	Year	Location/GPS Coordinates	Material	Dimensions	Owner	Image
(Mpozi Mural)		2007	Alleyway off of Guilford 39°52′12.54″N 86°8′35.08″W				
Black Titan	John Spaulding	1985	Indianapolis Art Center 39°52′41″N 86°8′36″W	Bronze	28 × 21 × 28 in	Indianapolis Art Center	
Monumentalment IV	Gary Freeman	1981	Indianapolis Art Center 39°52′41″N 86°8′42″W	Painted steel	270 × 154 × 19 in	Indianapolis Art Center	
Restful Place	Truman Lowe	2005	Indianapolis Art Center 39°52′42.9″N 86°8′39.38″W	Bronze, glass, limestone		Indianapolis Art Center	
Twisted House	John McNaughton	2005	Indianapolis Art Center 39°52′43.63″N 86°8′40.01″W	Wood		Indianapolis Art Center	
Ascent the Wind	Michael Helbing	2004	Indianapolis Art Center 39°52′40.81″N 86°8′33.77″W	Steel	11 ft × 10 ft × 5 ft	Indianapolis Art Center	
Dawnsong	Brose Partington	2008	Indianapolis Art Center 39°52′42.39″N 86°8′29.56″W	Steel, aluminum, siding & shingles		Indianapolis Art Center	
Empire Towers	R.M. Fischer	1985	Indianapolis Art Center 39°52′39.69″N 86°8′33.13″W	Stainless steel, aluminum, electric lights	16 ft	Indianapolis Art Center	
Imploding Cube	John Simms	2002	Indianapolis Art Center39°52′41.09″N 86°8′30.36″W	Aircraft aluminum	365.76 cm × 304.8 cm × 304.8 cm	Indianapolis Art Center	
Slightly Romanesque/Newhall 43	Robert Curtis	1981	Indianapolis Art Center	Concrete, metal		Indianapolis Art Center	
Sometimes I Sits	Michael Helbing	2005	Indianapolis Art Center			Indianapolis Art Center	
Spanish Gate	Lucio Ruiz Rojas	1955	Indianapolis Art Center			Indianapolis Art Center	
Confluence	Robert Stackhouse & Carol Mickett	2004	Indianapolis Art Center 39°52′39.33″N 86°8′40.09″W	Limestone		Indianapolis Art Center	
Totem	Robert Zeidman		Indianapolis Art Center	Painted steel		Indianapolis Art Center 39°52′40.75″N 86°8′38.53″W	
(Broad Ripple Totems)			39°52′25.33″N 86°8′37″W				

== Butler–Tarkington ==
Title	Artist	Year	Location/GPS Coordinates	Material	Dimensions	Owner	Image
(Butler Bulldog)	Matthew Gray Palmer		Butler University 39°50′13.06″N 86°10′18.99″W			Butler University	
Persephone	Armand Toussaint	1840	Butler University 39°50′42.98″N 86°10′11.84″W	Bronze, Limestone	63 × 22 × 16 in.	Butler University	
Socrates	W.V. Casey	1950	Butler University	Bronze, Limestone	20 × 13 × 6 in.	Butler University	

== Canterbury–Chatard ==
Title	Artist	Year	Location/GPS Coordinates	Material	Dimensions	Owner	Image
(Christ Mosaic)			Christ the King School 39°51′43.48″N 86°7′43.91″W				
Mary Queen of Heaven		1961	Bishop Chatard High School	Marble	11 ft. × 26 in. × 7 in.	Bishop Chatard High School	

== Castleton ==
Title	Artist	Year	Location/GPS Coordinates	Material	Dimensions	Owner	Image
Looking Beyond	James Wille Faust	1992	Allison Pointe Office Park 39°54′37″N 86°5′5″W	Steel	H. 17 ft. Diam. 18 ft.		
Christus		1960	Oaklawn Memorial Gardens 39°55′48″N 86°3′45″W	Marble	5 ft. 7 in. × 2 ft. 8 in. × 1 ft.	Oaklawn Memorial Gardens	
Jean Ann Weiss' Armillary Sphere		2008	Oaklawn Memorial Gardens 39°55′56.57″N 86°3′45.87″W				
Our Lady of the Miraculous Medal			Oaklawn Memorial Gardens 39°55′55.15″N 86°3′41.93″W				
John the Baptist	Melle	1960	Oaklawn Memorial Gardens 39°55′52″N 86°3′45″W	Marble	6 × 2 × 2 ft.	Oaklawn Memorial Gardens	
Ruth		1965	Oaklawn Memorial Gardens 39°55′53″N 86°3′55″W	Marble	4 ft. 2 in. × 1 ft. 7 in. × 2 ft	Oaklawn Memorial Gardens	
Sermon on the Mount		1960	Oaklawn Memorial Gardens 39°55′49″N 86°3′52″W	Marble	6 ft. × 2 ft. 1 in. × 1 ft. 2 in.	Oaklawn Memorial Gardens	
St. Teresa		1970	Oaklawn Memorial Gardens	Marble	6 × 2 1/2 × 2 ft.	Oaklawn Memorial Gardens	

== College Park ==
Title	Artist	Year	Location/GPS Coordinates	Material	Dimensions	Owner	Image
St. Ignatius Loyola	Jack Kreitzer	1991	Brebeuf Jesuit Preparatory School 39°54′40″N 86°12′37″W	Bronze	5 ft. 4 in × 2 ft. × 2 ft.	Brebeuf Jesuit Preparatory School	

== Crooked Creek ==
Title	Artist	Year	Location/GPS Coordinates	Material	Dimensions	Owner	Image
St. Monica			St. Monica Catholic Church 39°51′56.88″N 86°11′59.99″W			St. Monica Catholic Church	
St. Mark & St. Matthew			Washington Park North Cemetery 39°51′18.55″N 86°12′5.12″W		2 Statues	Washington Park North Cemetery	

== Delaware Trails ==
Title	Artist	Year	Location/GPS Coordinates	Material	Dimensions	Owner	Image
The Ruins	Elmer Tafflinger	1978	Holliday Park 39°52′16″N 86°9′52″W	Limestone, Brick, Wrought iron, & plants	30 ft. × 50 yd. × 100 yd.	City of Indianapolis	

== Downtown ==
=== Other Downtown locations ===
Title	Artist	Year	Location/GPS Coordinates	Material	Dimensions	Owner	Image
Sewall Memorial Torches		1922	Herron High School 39°47′18.9″N 86°9′19″W	Bronze	120 × 36 × 36	Indianapolis Museum of Art	
Untitled (Jazz Musicians)	John Spaulding	1995	The Gardens at Canal Court 39°46′32.64″N 86°9′59.52″W	Bronze	8 ft 5 in × 19 ft × 19 ft		
Free Money	Tom Otterness	1999	Indiana Convention Center, Corner of Maryland & West 39°45′56.17″N 86°9′59.71″W			Arts Council of Indianapolis	
King at Rest	Lorenzo Ghiglieri	1988	Indiana Convention Center, Corner of Maryland & West 39°45′56.17″N 86°9′59.71″W	Bronze		Indiana Convention Center	
Male Tourist	Tom Otterness	1999	Indiana Convention Center, Corner of Maryland & West 39°45′56.17″N 86°9′59.71″W			Arts Council of Indianapolis	
Female Tourist	Tom Otterness	1999	Indiana Convention Center, Corner of Maryland & West 39°45′56.17″N 86°9′59.71″W			Arts Council of Indianapolis	
Table of Contents	Dale Enochs	1999	Joseph F. Miller Center 39°46′28.2″N 86°9′58.26″W	Limestone	42 ft × 50 ft × 20 ft	The Joseph F. Miller Center	
Glory	Gary Bibbs	1999	The Joseph F. Miller Center 39°46′28.26″N 86°9′57.96″W	Bronze & Steel	24 m × 12 m × 0.30 m	The Joseph F. Miller Center	
Jammin' on the Avenue	John Spaulding	1989	Lockefield Gardens 39°46′38.76″N 86°10′12.36″W	Brass musical instruments	9 ft. 8 in. × 4 ft. × 4 ft.		
James Whitcomb Riley (bust)	Myra Reynolds Richards	1916	James Whitcomb Riley Museum Home 39°46′19.97″N 86°8′52.58″W	Bronze	27 × 17 × 17 in.	James Whitcomb Riley Memorial Association	
World War II Memorial	Patrick Brunner	1998	American Legion Mall	Limestone, granite	H 25 F × W 9 F	City of Indianapolis	
Korean War Memorial		1996	American Legion Mall			City of Indianapolis	
Vietnam War Memorial		1996	American Legion Mall			City of Indianapolis	
Depew Memorial Fountain	Alexander Stirling Calder	1919	University Park 39°46′19″N 86°9′25″W	bronze, granite	25 × 45 × 45 ft. (14 m.)	City of Indianapolis	
Pan	Roger White	1980	University Park39°46′19″N 86°9′27″W	Bronze, Limestone	30 in. × 14 in. × 19 in.	City of Indianapolis	
Schuyler Colfax	Lorado Taft	1887	University Park39°46′19″N 86°9′23″W	Bronze, Oak Hill granite	8 ft. 4 in. × 2 ft. × 2 ft.	City of Indianapolis	
Seated Lincoln	Henry Hering	1934	University Park 39°46′18″N 86°9′23″W	Bronze, Vermont rose granite		City of Indianapolis	
Statue of Benjamin Harrison	Charles Henry Niehaus	1908	University Park 39°46′17″N 86°9′25″W	Bronze, Limestone	128 × 47 × 51 in	City of Indianapolis	
Statue of Richard Lugar	Ryan Feeney	2024	Lugar Plaza 39°46′3″N 86°9′13″W	Bronze			
Syrinx	Adolph Wolter	1973	University Park 39°46′19″N 86°9′24″W	Bronze, Limestone	27 in × 16 in. × 13 in.	City of Indianapolis	
Indiana World War Memorial Figures (Courage, Memory, Peace, Victory, Liberty, Patriotism)	Henry Hering	1928	Indiana World War Memorial Plaza	Limestone	24 figures, each 8 × 3 × 2 ft.	State of Indiana	
Obelisk Reliefs (Indiana World War Memorial) (Law, Science, Religion, Education)	Henry Hering	1929	Indiana World War Memorial Plaza	Bronze, Berwick black granite	6 ft. × 4 ft. × 3 in.	State of Indiana	
Pro Patria	Henry Hering	1929	Indiana World War Memorial Plaza	Bronze	24 ft. × 7 ft. 8 in. × 5 ft. 5 in.	State of Indiana	
Carvings (Indiana State Library)	Leon Hermant	1934	Indiana State Library39°46′11″N 86°9′49″W	Limestone	80 in × 80 in × 5 in	State of Indiana	
Figures on St. Mary's Church	Alexander Sangernebo, William Kriner	1911	St. Mary's Catholic Church 39°46′20″N 86°9′02″W	Limestone	7 ft. × 90 in. × 8 in.	St. Mary's Church	
(Mary)			St. Mary's Catholic Church 39°46′19.6″N 86°9′0.46″W			St. Mary's Church	
Mary	Franz Mayer Studio	1970	St. Mary's Catholic Church 39°46′20″N 86°9′02″W	Marble	56 × 25 × 15 in.	St. Mary's Church	
Sacred Heart		1970	St. Mary's Catholic Church 39°46′19″N 86°9′02″W	Marble	58 × 28 × 16 in.	St. Mary's Church	
Saint Joseph	Franz Mayer Studio	1970	St. Mary's Catholic Church 39°46′20″N 86°9′02″W	Marble	56 × 22 × 16 in.	St. Mary's Church	
Caricatured Athletes	Adolf Scherrer	1913	Van Rooy Apartments, 902 N. Meridian 39°46′45″N 86°9′29″W	Limestone	2 ft. 4 in. × 1 ft. 6 in. × 5 ft.	Van Rooy Properties	
Apollo/Aurora Relief Panels			Apollo/Aurora Apartment Buildings 39°46′55″N 86°9′11″W	Terra cotta or Plaster, Paint	Two panels, each 5 ft. × 6 ft. × 6 in.	Van Rooy Properties	
Mary	D. A. Bohlen and Sons, fabricator	1876	Roberts Park Methodist Church 39°46′23″N 86°9′15″W	Limestone	10 ft. × 3 ft. × 2 ft. 9 in	Roberts Park Methodist Church	
St. John Pondering the Scriptures	Joseph Quarmby	1871	St. John Catholic Church 39°45′54″N 86°9′42″W	Limestone	1 1/4 ft. × Diam. 6 ft.	St. John Catholic Church	
The Greeting	George Carlson	1988	Eiteljorg Museum of American Indians and Western Art 39°46′5″N 86°10′4″W	Bronze	11 ft. 6 in. × 87 in. × 54 in	Eiteljorg Museum of American Indians and Western Art	
Inukshuk (Irniq)	Peter Irniq	2008	Eiteljorg Museum of American Indians and Western Art			Eiteljorg Museum of American Indians and Western Art	
Morning Prayer (Houser)	Allan Houser	1987	Eiteljorg Museum of American Indians and Western Art			Eiteljorg Museum of American Indians and Western Art	
Myaamionki	Gerald Clarke	2007	Eiteljorg Museum of American Indians and Western Art			Eiteljorg Museum of American Indians and Western Art	
Oonseentia	Gerald Clarke	2007	Eiteljorg Museum of American Indians and Western Art			Eiteljorg Museum of American Indians and Western Art	
Running Deer	Kenneth Bunn	1989	Eiteljorg Museum of American Indians and Western Art 39°46′3″N 86°10′3″W	Bronze	10 × 85 × 25 ft.	Eiteljorg Museum of American Indians and Western Art	
Seekaahkwiaanki	Gerald Clarke	2007	Eiteljorg Museum of American Indians and Western Art			Eiteljorg Museum of American Indians and Western Art	
Southwest Summer Showers	Doug Hyde	1989	Eiteljorg Museum of American Indians and Western Art			Eiteljorg Museum of American Indians and Western Art	
Time Landscape of Indianapolis	Alan Sonfist	1989	Eiteljorg Museum of American Indians and Western Art	Beech trees, maple trees, native wildflowers, prairie grass, bronze, stone.	25 × 400 × 50 ft	Eiteljorg Museum of American Indians and Western Art	
Water Whispers	Truman Lowe	2005	Eiteljorg Museum of American Indians and Western Art			Eiteljorg Museum of American Indians and Western Art	
Wisdom Keepers	Bruce LaFountain	1998	Eiteljorg Museum of American Indians and Western Art			Eiteljorg Museum of American Indians and Western Art	
Untitled (Man Reading Paper)	Scott O'Hara	1990	748 E. Bates 39°45′48.04″N 86°8′41.32″W	Painted plastic, resin, wood and metal bench	3 ft. 9 in. × 3 ft. × 2 ft. 7 in		
Untitled (Paperboy)	Scott O'Hara	1990	748 E. Bates 39°45′48.8″N 86°8′41.57″W	Painted plastic, resin	4 ft. 7 in. × 1 ft. 7 in. × 1 ft.		
Untitled (Policeman)	Scott O'Hara	1990	748 E. Bates 39°45′48.04″N 86°8′41.32″W	Painted plastic, resin	5 ft. × 2 ft. 5 in. × 1 ft.		
Ann Dancing	Julian Opie	2007	Corner of Mass Ave and Vermont				
Brick Head 3	James Tyler	2004	Mass Ave				
Honor Guard	Stephen E. Woodridge	2001	Mass Ave and College.				
Marina	Bernie Carreno	2004	Mass Ave				
Odyssey	Ray Katz	2008	Mass Ave				
The Phoenix	Dale Enochs		Mass Ave and St. Clair Street.				
Sole' Mech	Kevin Huff		Mass Ave				
Viewfinders	Eric Nordgulen	1986	Mass Ave and Delaware				
Visual and Mental Paradoxes	Jerald Jacquard	1999	Mass Ave, College and St. Clair Streets. 39°46′39″N 86°08′44″W				
Masonic Figures	George Schreiber	1929	Scottish Rite Cathedral 39°46′34.07″N 86°9′28.77″W	Limestone	East figures: 4 × 2 1/2 × 1 1/2 ft., South figures: 1 1/2 ft. × 1 1/2 ft. × 3 in.	Scottish Rite	
Blacherne Apartments Building (Carvings)	Henry Saunders	1895	The Blacherne Apartments 39°46′22″N 86°9′29″W	Limestone	2 ft. × 1 1/2 ft. × 4 in.		
Relief Above Entrances to North Wing	David Kresz Rubins	1937–1938	Indianapolis Old Federal Building 39°46′16″N 86°9′23″W	Limestone	2 reliefs. Each 7 1/2 × 16 × 1 1/2 ft.	General Services Administration	
Arts, Sciences and Letters	Richard Bock	1892	Indianapolis Public Library Central Library	Bronze	13 × 17 × 6 ft.	Indianapolis Public Library	
For Endless Trees	Gary Freeman	1937	WFYI-FM 39°47′22″N 86°9′27″W	Cor-Ten Steel	490 cm × 160 cm × 120 cm	WFYI-FM	
Painting (Herron Art Annex Relief)	C. Paul Jennewein	1929	Herron School of Art 39°47′21″N 86°9′20″W	Terra cotta	30 × 30 × 5 in.	Herron High School	
Ideal Scout	R. Tait McKenzie	Original 1937, Cast 1990	Boy Scouts of North America 39°47′32″N 86°9′28″W	Bronze	4 ft. 8 in. × 2 ft. × 2 ft.	Boy Scouts of North America	
Sculpture (Herron Art Annex Relief)	C. Paul Jennewein	1929	Herron High School 39°47′22″N 86°9′19″W	Terra cotta	30 × 30 × 5 in.	Herron High School	
Portrait Medallions	Rudolph Schwarz	1906	Herron High School	Limestone	5 reliefs, each 50 × 50 × 18 in.	Herron High School	
Musicians (sculpture)	Mike Cunningham	1984	OneAmerica Tower 39°46′15″N 86°9′38″W	Bronze	4 figures. Pianist: 41 × 32 × 54 in., Horn Player: 22 × 13 × 23 in., Violinist: 33 × 15 × 23 in. & Cellist: 62 × 27 × 36 in.	One America Company	
The Unity of Life	David L. Rodgers	1983	OneAmerica Tower 39°46′15″N 86°9′38″W	Limestone	16 × 29 × 13 in.	One America Company	
Industry, Agriculture, Literature & Justice	J. Massey Rhind	1906	Birch Bayh Federal Building and United States Courthouse 39°46′13″N 86°9′25″W	Limestone	4 figures. 100 × 80 × 85 in.	General Services Administration	
Flying	Zenos Frudakis	1987	Capital Center, Ohio & Pierson 39°46′13″N 86°9′33″W	Bronze	approx. 95 × 25 × 50 in.; Pole: H. 32 in. × Diam. 3 in.		
Reaching	Zenos Frudakis	1987	Capital Center, N. Illinois 39°46′15″N 86°9′34″W	Bronze	68 × 115 × 42 in.		
Pair of Eagles Perched on Globes	Alexander Sangernebo	1904	Former Indiana State Museum 39°46′13″N 86°9′10″W	Limestone	2 statues, each 98 × 48 × 48 in.		
Mercury and Two Allegorical Figures	Henry Saunders	1896–1897	One Indiana Square 39°46′15″N 86°9′21″W	Limestone	6 ft. × 70 in. × 53 in.		
Circle Theater Reliefs	Alexander Sangernebo	1916	Hilbert Circle Theatre 39°46′5″N 86°9′27″W	Terra cotta	3 panels. Pediment: 3 ft. × 12 ft. × 4 in., Cornice: 4 ft. × 11 ft. × 4 in.	Hilbert Circle Theatre	
Spirit of Indiana: George Rogers Clark	John H. Mahoney	1895	Monument Circle 39°46′08″N 86°9′30″W	Bronze	7 × 3 × 4 ft.	State of Indiana	
Spirit of Indiana: William Henry Harrison	John H. Mahoney	1895	Monument Circle 39°46′08″N 86°9′28″W	Bronze	7 × 4 × 2 ft.	State of Indiana	
Spirit of Indiana: Oliver P. Morton	Franklin Simmons	1894	Monument Circle	Bronze	7 × 3 × 3 ft	State of Indiana	
Spirit of Indiana: James Whitcomb	John H. Mahoney	1889	Monument Circle 39°46′07″N 86°9′27″W	Bronze	7 × 3 × 2 1/2 ft.	State of Indiana	
Spirit of Indiana: War and Peace	Rudolph Schwarz, Frederick William MacMonnies, George Thomas Brewster, Nicolaus Geiger	1887	Monument Circle 39°46′06″N 86°9′29″W	Bedford limestone	H. 284 ft. × Diam. 110 ft.	State of Indiana	
Relief Panels on Test Building	Rubush & Hunter	1924	Test Building 39°46′6″N 86°9′32″W	Limestone	13 reliefs. Each 3 1/2 ft. × 3 ft. × 6 in.		
Indiana Theater (Facade)	Alexander Sangernebo	1927	Indiana Repertory Theatre 39°46′2″N 86°9′40″W	Terra cotta	64 × 44 × 2 ft.	Indiana Repertory Theatre	
Lincoln Plaque	Rudolph Schwarz	1907	300 W. Washington 39°46′03″N 86°9′55″W	Coated bronze plaque on a limestone base	65 × 37 × 1 1/3 in.	State of Indiana	
Old Trails Building	Joseph Posey	1928	Old Trails Building 39°46′02″N 86°9′52″W	Terra cotta	25 × 40 × 36 in.	Puritan Home Funding Company	
Quaestio Librae	Jerry Dane Sanders	1975	Indianapolis City–County Building 39°46′01″N 86°9′10″W	Painted metal	25 × 8 × 8 ft.	Indianapolis-Marion County Building Authority	
Blueridge Papers Relief	Unknown	1927	White River State Park 39°45′59.76″N 86°10′15.51″W	Limestone	5 ft. × 3 1/2 ft. × 6 in.	White River State Park	
River Promenade (Rose Window and Bas Reliefs)	Angela Danadjieva	1988	White River State Park 39°46′04″N 86°10′35″W	Indiana Limestone	Rose window 6 ft. diameter	White River State Park	
Totem	Rinaldo Paluzzi	1983	White River State Park 39°46′04″N 86°10′17″W	Stainless steel	33 × 5 × 5 ft.	White River State Park	
Flora Metalica	Douglas M. Gruizenga		White River State Park				
Jet Stream	Nicole Beck	2004	White River State Park				
Linear V	Jarrett K. Hawkins		White River State Park				
Selective Memory	Chris Wubbena		White River State Park				
Sky Waltz	John Mishler		White River State Park				
Ultimate Eternal Bow	Aaron Lee Benson		White River State Park				
Upturned Loader	Brian McCutcheon	2008	White River State Park				
Yellow Butterfly	James Havens		White River State Park				
Peace	Robert William Davidson	1929	Shortridge High School 39°49′4″N 86°9′23″W	Concrete	8 ft. 11 in. × 5 ft. 6 in. × 4 in.	Indianapolis Public Schools	
War	Robert William Davidson	1929	Shortridge High School 39°49′4″N 86°9′23″W	Concrete	8 ft. 11 in. × 5 ft. 6 in. × 4 in.	Indianapolis Public Schools	
(Capital Grille Lions)			The Capital Grille 39°46′2.12″N 86°9′32.38″W			Darden Restaurants	
Thinman	Peter Shelton	2009	Indianapolis Public Library Central Library 39°46′41.2″N 86°9′25.39″W			Indianapolis Public Library	
Little Bird	Peter Shelton	2009	Indianapolis Public Library Central Library 39°46′41.13″N 86°9′23.37″W			Indianapolis Public Library	
Stainless Steel Pipe/Ells	John Stierch	1983	Central Stainless Equipment 39°45′16.14″N 86°9′32.56″W	Stainless Steel		Central Stainless Equipment	
Tomlinson Hall Arch			City Market 39°46′6.89″N 86°9′13.81″W			Only above ground remnant of Tomlinson Hall	
Cancer...There's Hope	Victor Salmones	1995	Indiana Ave & 10th St. 39°46′50.19″N 86°10′28.29″W				
Ebb and Flow (mural)	Douglas David	2006	Consolidated Building 39°46′8.4″N 86°9′21.88″W	Exterior house paint		Arts Council of Indianapolis	
Color Fuses	Milton Glaser	1975	Minton-Capehart Federal Building 39°46′29.17″N 86°9′19.35″W			General Services Administration	
(Murat Shriner)			Murat Shrine 39°46′30.36″N 86°9′2.86″W			Ancient Arabic Order of the Nobles of the Mystic Shrine	
Jimmy O'Donnell & U.S.S. Indianapolis Memorial		2009	City Market 39°46′6.94″N 86°9′13.13″W				
Knotted Lamp	Andrew Hunter	2006	Mass Ave 39°46′27.26″N 86°8′59.9″W				
Wind Leaves (Kister)	Bart Kister	1979	James Whitcomb Riley Hospital for Children 39°46′36.24″N 86°10′43.44″W	Metal			
Southern Circle	Don Gummer	2004	39°45′38.4″N 86°9′31.32″W				
(The Bull)		2009	39°46′55.56″N 86°9′39.71″W				
(US 40 Marker)		2009	39°46′0.73″N 86°8′39.49″W				
(NCAA Mascot)			White River State Park 39°46′3.82″N 86°10′14.99″W			National Collegiate Athletic Association	

== Eagle Creek ==
Title	Artist	Year	Location/GPS Coordinates	Material	Dimensions	Owner	Image
The Golden Eagle	Dan Ostermiller	1989	Eagle Creek Park 39°52′40″N 86°17′42″W	Bronze	8 × 8 × 4 ft.	City of Indianapolis	

== Fairgrounds ==
Title	Artist	Year	Location/GPS Coordinates	Material	Dimensions	Owner	Image
Indiana State Fairgrounds commemorative collage	Eric Ernstberger	2006	Indiana State Fairgrounds 39°49′32.79″N 86°7′54.18″W	Painted aluminum	72' × 9'	Indiana State Fairgrounds	

== Far Eastside ==
Title	Artist	Year	Location/GPS Coordinates	Material	Dimensions	Owner	Image
Christ Bearing Cross		1962	Washington Park Cemetery East 39°46′50″N 85°58′39″W	Marble	6 ft. 2 in. × 2 ft. 6 in. × 2 ft.	Washington Park Cemetery East	
Christus		1962	Washington Park Cemetery East 39°46′50″N 85°58′26″W	Painted fiberglass	6 × 4 × 2 ft	Washington Park Cemetery East	
Four Chaplains (Fox, Polling, Goode, Washington)		1973	Washington Park Cemetery East 39°46′51″N 85°58′31″W	Marble	8 ft. 2 in. × 4 ft. 5 in. × 3 ft. 7 in	Washington Park Cemetery East	
George Washington	L. Frizzi	1955	Washington Park Cemetery East 39°46′37″N 85°58′26″W	Bronze	6 ft. × 2 ft. 5 in. × 2 ft. 5 in.	Washington Park Cemetery	
Moses		1974	Washington Park Cemetery East 39°46′53″N 85°58′27″W	Marble	11 ft. × 3 ft. × 2 ft. 6 in.	Washington Park Cemetery East	
George Washington Monument			Washington Park Cemetery East 39°46′43.06″N 85°58′25.64″W			Washington Park Cemetery East	
Hoosier Patriot Memorial	Bill Wolfe	2007	Washington Park Cemetery East 39°46′35.83″N 85°58′27.69″W			Washington Park Cemetery East	
(Court of Brothers)			Washington Park Cemetery East			Washington Park Cemetery East	
Mount Vernon Mausoleum (Sanctuary of Memories)	Adolph Wolter	1944	Washington Park Cemetery East	Limestone	8 ft. × 3 1/2 ft. × 4 in.	Washington Park Cemetery East	
Our Little Lambs	Leonard Grosse	1967	Washington Park Cemetery East	Bronze	2 ft. 6 in. × 1 ft. × 1 ft. 5 in	Washington Park Cemetery East	

== Fountain Square ==
Title	Artist	Year	Location/GPS Coordinates	Material	Dimensions	Owner	Image
Lady Spray Fountain		2010	Fountain Square 39°45′7.94″N 86°8′23.46″W				
Pioneer Family	Myra Reynolds Richards	1924	Fountain Square 39°45′7.56″N 86°8′23.36″W	Bronze & Limestone	H. 62 in. × Diam. 24 in.	City of Indianapolis	

== Garfield Park ==
Title	Artist	Year	Location/GPS Coordinates	Material	Dimensions	Owner	Image
General Henry Lawton	Andrew O'Connor	1906	Garfield Park 39°43′58″N 86°8′30″W	Bronze & Granite	8 1/2 ft. × 26 1/2 in. × 31 1/2 in.	City of Indianapolis	
St. Joseph		1874	St. Joseph Cemetery 39°43′59″N 86°9′39″W	Painted cast metal	8 ft. × 2 ft. × 18 in.	St. Joseph Cemetery	
Sacred Heart of Jesus		1960	Calvary Cemetery 39°42′59″N 86°10′2″W	Granite	10 ft. × 32 in. × 26 in.	Archdiocese of Indianapolis	

== Irvington ==
Title	Artist	Year	Location/GPS Coordinates	Material	Dimensions	Owner	Image
Our Lady of Lourdes	F. H. Wilhelm Construction	1941	Our Lady of Lourdes Church 39°46′13″N 86°4′40″W	Limestone	9 ft. × 107 in. × 3 in.	Our Lady of Lourdes Church	
Washington Irving	William Kriner	1936	George W. Julian School #57	Limestone	2 ft. × 1 ft. 3 in. × 11 in.	Indianapolis Public Schools	
Washington Irving	William Kriner	1971	Irving Circle Park	Copper clad iron core	2 ft. × 1 ft. 3 in. × 11 in.	City of Indianapolis	

== Keystone at the Crossing ==
Title	Artist	Year	Location/GPS Coordinates	Material	Dimensions	Owner	Image
Crack the Whip	John Seward Johnson II	1986	Sheraton Hotel, 8787 Keystone Crossing Blvd.	Bronze	H 4 ft. × W 12 ft. × D 15 ft.	Sheraton Hotels & Resorts	
Trigonum	Don Robertson	1979	8900 Keystone Crossing 39°55′3″N 86°6′39″W	Steel	15 × 4 × 6 ft.		

== Mapleton–Fall Creek ==
Title	Artist	Year	Location/GPS Coordinates	Material	Dimensions	Owner	Image
The Dino's	Brian Cooley	2004	The Children's Museum of Indianapolis 39°48′37.02″N 86°9′31.9″W			The Children's Museum of Indianapolis	
Tug o'War	Glenna Goodacre	1988	The Children's Museum of Indianapolis 39°48′38″N 86°9′30″W	Bronze	Approx. 4 × 2 × 5 1/2 ft.	Children's Museum of Indianapolis	
Sunflowers	John Moore	2013	Fall Creek Gardens - 3001 Central Ave, Indianapolis 46205	Acrylic Exterior Paint	1100 Square Feet	Fall Creek Gardens/Unleavened Bread Cafe/Urban Patch	
Interdependence	John Moore	2015	Urban Patch Park Garden - 30th and Park Ave, Indianapolis 46205	Public Art	1000-pound 8-foot X 8-foot public sculpture	Urban Patch	

== Marian–Cold Springs ==
Title	Artist	Year	Location/GPS Coordinates	Material	Dimensions	Owner	Image
St. Francis		1941	Marian University 39°49′0.05″N 86°12′8.82″W	Concrete	65 × 42 1/2 × 36 in.	Marian University	

== Martindale–Brightwood ==
Title	Artist	Year	Location/GPS Coordinates	Material	Dimensions	Owner	Image
St. Rita	Anthony Joseph Lauck	1959	St. Rita Roman Catholic Church 39°47′56″N 86°8′07″W	Limestone	12 ft. × 2 ft. 7 in. × 5 in.	St. Rita Roman Catholic Church	

== Meadows ==
Title	Artist	Year	Location/GPS Coordinates	Material	Dimensions	Owner	Image
V Shaped Abstract Sculpture		1960s	Pentecostal Assemblies of the World 39°49′41″N 86°6′46″W	Concrete	7 × 7 × 6 ft.	Pentecostal Assemblies of the World	

== Meridian Hills ==
Title	Artist	Year	Location/GPS Coordinates	Material	Dimensions	Owner	Image
Doorway of the Angels	Adolph Wolter	1959	Second Presbyterian Church 39°53′41″N 86°9′33″W	Limestone	12 × 8 × 2 ft.	Second Presbyterian Church	
Door of the Reformer	Adolph Wolter	1959	Second Presbyterian Church 39°53′46″N 86°9′33″W	Limestone	5 ft. × 1 ft. 1/2 in. × 5 in.	Second Presbyterian Church	

== Meridian–Kessler ==
Title	Artist	Year	Location/GPS Coordinates	Material	Dimensions	Owner	Image
(Balloon Mural)			49th & College Ave. 39°50′35.16″N 86°8′45.54″W				
Our Lady of Fatima	Henry Liva	1948	Immaculate Heart of Mary Church 39°51′24.48″N 86°9′7.56″W	Limestone	6 ft. 8 in. × 3 ft. × 2 ft. 4 in	Immaculate Heart of Mary Church	
Four Evangelists (Matthew, Mark, Luke, John)	Ira Correll	1928	St. Joan of Arc Church 39°49′57″N 86°8′58″W	Limestone	8 × 2 × 2 ft.	St. Joan of Arc Church	

== Near Eastside ==
Title	Artist	Year	Location/GPS Coordinates	Material	Dimensions	Owner	Image
Woodruff Place Fountains and Statuary	J. L. Mott Iron Works	1870s	Woodruff Place 39°46′31.58″N 86°7′36.9″W	Painted metal and concrete.	Varies, over 10 pieces.	City of Indianapolis	
Saint Therese		1940	Church of the Little Flower 39°47′05″N 86°5′25″W	Bronze, concrete	62 × 23 × 17 in	Church of the Little Flower	
Book Gnomes	Alexander Sangernebo	1909	Indianapolis Public Library, East Washington Branch	Terra cotta	Two figures. approx. 3 × 2 × 2 ft.	Indianapolis Public Library	

== Near Northside ==
Title	Artist	Year	Location/GPS Coordinates	Material	Dimensions	Owner	Image
William Watson Woollen School#45 Entrance	Alexander Sangernebo		William Watson Woollen School #45 39°47′59″N 86°8′52″W	Terra cotta	approx. 2 ft. × 2 ft. × 20 in.		
Landmark for Peace Memorial	Daniel Edwards	1994	Dr. Martin Luther King, Jr. Park 39°47′27″N 86°8′47″W	Bronze & Cor-Ten Steel		Indianapolis Parks	

== Near Northwest – Riverside ==
Title	Artist	Year	Location/GPS Coordinates	Material	Dimensions	Owner	Image
Art Deco Relief Panels of Baseball Players		1931	Bush Stadium 39°47′15″N 86°11′22″W	Limestone	Each 85 × 42 × 3 in.	Indianapolis Indians	
(Holy Angel)			Holy Angels Catholic Church 39°48′27″N 86°10′22″W			Holy Angels Catholic Church	

== Near Southside ==
Title	Artist	Year	Location/GPS Coordinates	Material	Dimensions	Owner	Image
Pinna Memorial			Calvary Cemetery 39°42′58.99″N 86°9′55.7″W				
Thomas Memorial			Calvary Cemetery 39°43′6.78″N 86°10′1.33″W				
(Christ on the Cross)			Calvary Cemetery 39°43′6.89″N 86°9′57.28″W				
(Christ Mosaics)			Calvary Cemetery 39°43′4.84″N 86°9′57.01″W				
(Good Shepherd)			Calvary Cemetery 39°42′57.91″N 86°9′48.93″W				
Our Lady of Lourdes and Bernadette		1942	Sacred Heart Church 39°44′47″N 86°9′28″W	Metal	Mary: 61 in. × 2 ft. × 17 in / Bernadette: 31 × 11 × 16 in.	Sacred Heart Church	
Sacred Heart		1890	Sacred Heart Church 39°44′48″N 86°9′29″W		5 ft. × 2 ft. × 20 in.	Sacred Heart Church	
Sacred Heart of Jesus	Donald Wood	1961	Sacred Heart Church 39°44′47″N 86°9′29″W	Marble	5 ft. × 46 in. × 14 in.	Sacred Heart Church	
Saint Francis		1893	Sacred Heart Church 39°44′47″N 86°9′28″W	Limestone	63 × 24 × 17 in	Sacred Heart Church	
Southside Turnverein	Rudolph Schwarz	1899–1900	5th Quarter Lounge	Terra Cotta & Limestone	11 1/2 × 17 × 1 1/2 ft.	5th Quarter Lounge	
Play	Lars Jonker	2002	Hendricks Park 39°44′59.65″N 86°9′14.37″W	Painted Metal		Bates-Hendricks Neighborhood Association	

== Near Westside ==
Title	Artist	Year	Location/GPS Coordinates	Material	Dimensions	Owner	Image
American Bison	William E. Arnold	1989	White River State Park 39°46′2.79″N 86°10′34.23″W	Barbed Wire	69 × 86 × 26 in.	Indianapolis Zoo	
North American Plains Animals	William E. Arnold	1988	White River State Park	Barbed Wire	8 animals, various.	Indianapolis Zoo	
Traditional Chinese Lions		1988	White River State Park39°45′59.48″N 86°10′38.63″W	White marble	2 lions, 53 × 24 1/2 × 38 in.	Indianapolis Zoo	
George Washington Community High School Mural			George Washington Community High School 39°45′55.03″N 86°11′59.45″W	Paint		Indianapolis Public Schools	

== Nora / Far Northside ==
Title	Artist	Year	Location/GPS Coordinates	Material	Dimensions	Owner	Image
Arrows of Direction	Martina Nehrling	1989	North Central High School 39°54′44″N 86°7′50″W	Stainless steel	H 8 ft., D. 12 ft.	Metropolitan School District of Washington Township	
Equipose 14	Lyle London	1992	350 E. 96th St.39°55′45″N 86°9′6″W	Lacquered aluminum	H. 20 ft. Diam. 8 ft.		

== North Central ==
Title	Artist	Year	Location/GPS Coordinates	Material	Dimensions	Owner	Image
Arrows of Direction	Martina Nehrling	1989	North Central High School 39°54′44″N 86°7′50″W	Stainless steel	H 8 ft., D. 12 ft.	Metropolitan School District of Washington Township	
Commerce City	Jeff Laramore	2004	Junior Achievement of Central Indiana 39°53′23.46″N 86°7′17.65″W			Junior Achievement of Central Indiana	

== St. Vincent / Greenbriar ==
Title	Artist	Year	Location/GPS Coordinates	Material	Dimensions	Owner	Image
Untitled (Hook)	Charles Hook	1973	Pickwick Farms Apartments	Metal	H. 8 ft. W. 8 ft. L. 17 ft.	Borns Management	
Untitled Semi-Circles (Hook)	Charles Hook	1973	Pickwick Farms Apartments	Painted metal	H. 7 ft. 3 in. W. 10 ft. L. 28 ft. 7 in	Borns Management	
Tightrope (Spellings)	Art Spellings	1973	Pickwick Farms Apartments	Painted metal	H. 13 ft. L. 55 ft.	Borns Management	
Untitled (Gary Edson)	Gary Edson	1973	Pickwick Farms Apartments 39°55′26″N 86°11′11″W	Painted metal	H. 22 ft. Diam. 4 ft. 6 in.	Borns Management	
Untitled (Krol)	Ronald Krol	1973	Pickwick Farms Apartments 39°55′24″N 86°11′13″W	Painted metal	H. 9 ft. 6 in. W. 6 ft. 6 in. L. 12 ft.	Borns Management	
Untitled Triangular Elements (Spellings)	Art Spellings	1973	Pickwick Farms Apartments	Painted metal	West piece: 14 ft. × 3 ft. 9 in. × 3 ft. 9 in.; Center piece: approx. 11 ft. × 3 ft. 9 in. × 3 ft. 9 in.; East piece: approx. 12 ft. × 3 ft. 9 in. × 3 ft. 9 in.	Borns Management	
Untitled Weather Vane (Spellings)	Art Spellings	1979	Pickwick Farms Apartments	Painted metal	H. 10 ft. 9 in. W. 1 ft.	Borns Management	
Untitled X and Triangle (Spellings)	Art Spellings	1979	Pickwick Farms Apartments	Painted metal	"X": H. 15 ft. × W. 1 ft. Triangle: H. 12 ft. × W. 1 ft.	Borns Management	
Our Lady of Fatima		1977	St. Augustine Home for the Aged 39°54′38″N 86°12′00″W	Marble	6 ft. 6 in. × 2 ft. × 8 in.	St. Augustine Home for the Aged	
Sacred Heart		1967	St. Augustine Home for the Aged	Marble	6 ft. × 2 ft. × 8 in.;	St. Augustine Home for the Aged	
St. Joseph	Charles Matthew Brown	1967	St. Augustine Home for the Aged 39°54′39″N 86°12′05″W	Limestone	8 ft. × 2 ft. × 6 in.	St. Augustine Home for the Aged	
St. Vincent (Indianapolis)		1983	8401 Harcourt Rd. 39°54′31″N 86°11′34″W	Marble	6 × 2 × 2 ft.	St. Vincent Indianapolis Hospital	

== See also ==
- List of public art in Milwaukee
- List of public art in Philadelphia
- List of public art in Washington, D.C.
