= Untitled (Krol) =

Untitled (Sculpture by Krol)
- Year: 1973
- Type: Painted metal
- Dimensions: 290 cm × 200 cm × 370 cm (114 in × 78 in × 144 in)
- Location: Pickwick Farms; Indianapolis, Indiana; 39°55′24″N 86°11′13″W
- Owner: Pickwick Farms

Untitled (Krol) is a public artwork by American artist Ronald W. Krol. It is located on the grounds of Pickwick Farms, an apartment complex in Indianapolis, Indiana. The artwork consists of three red rectilinear shapes intersecting each other and resting on concrete pads. Krol's work is one of several abstract pieces by Herron School of Art graduates that were commissioned in the mid-1970s by real estate developer Robert Born for the Pickwick apartments.

== Description ==
Untitled (Krol) is made of multiple painted metal panels, most likely steel, that have been welded together and painted red. This abstract sculpture rests on concrete pads and is surrounded by a circular bed of mulch.

== Information ==
Little is known about the sculpture or the artist. Krol graduated from the Herron School of Art in the mid-1970s. The artwork was surveyed in 1992 as part of the Save Outdoor Sculpture! campaign. It is located just off Racquetball Drive and visible in Google Street View. Surrounding the artwork is a cluster of pine trees.

=== Acquisition ===
Like Broken Walrus II, this artwork and several others were commissioned by Robert Borns in the 1970s, when Pickwick Farms and another apartment complex nearby were owned by Borns Management.

== See also ==
- Broken Walrus II
