= Restful Place =

Artwork by Ho-Chunk artist Truman Lowe

- Artist: Truman Lowe
- Type: Stone, Bronze, Glass, Wood
- Location: Indianapolis Art Center; Indianapolis, Indiana, United States; 39°52′42.9″N 86°8′39.38″W
- Owner: Indianapolis Art Center

Restful Place is a public artwork by Ho-Chunk artist Truman Lowe, located at Indianapolis Art Center in Indianapolis, Indiana, United States. Restful Place was installed as part of the Center's ARTSPARK initiative.

== Description ==
Restful Place focuses on a curved limestone bench and above it is an arched bronze and glass canopy. The bench consists of four pieces of limestone that have waves carved into them and the bronze canopy resembles wood. The sculpture is placed in a wooded area that overlooks the White River to provide a "restful" place for visitors to sit when visiting the ARTSPARK.

== Acquisition ==
This piece was placed in conjunction with the Center's ARTSPARK which brings together art and nature.

== Information ==
Lowe's sculpture incorporates the surrounding Woodland environment where the ARTSPARK is located. With its unique and welcoming structure, is expresses Lowe's concept of bringing the viewer and sculpture into a heightened sense of place. He hopes that his work encourages the viewer to become more aware of environmental destruction and conservation.

== See also ==
- Visual arts by indigenous peoples of the Americas
