= Statue of James E. O'Donnell =

Sculpture in Indianapolis, Indiana, U.S.

- The statue outside Firefighters' Union Hall on Massachusetts Avenue in 2024
- Subject: James E. O'Donnell
- Location: Indianapolis, Indiana, U.S.; 39°46′39.5″N 86°8′44.0″W

A statue of James E. O'Donnell is installed in Indianapolis, Indiana. It was dedicated in 2009. Previously installed outside the City Market on the West Plaza, the sculpture was relocated on January 1, 2019. In 2023, the statue was relocated to Firefighters' Union Hall on Massachusetts Avenue because of the renovation of City Market.

== See also ==
- List of public art in Indianapolis
