= King at Rest =

American sculpture

- Artist: Lorenzo Ghiglieri
- Year: 1988
- Type: Bronze
- Dimensions: 140 cm × 76 cm × 61 cm (54 in × 30 in × 24 in)
- Location: Indiana Convention Center; Indianapolis, Indiana, United States; 39.765654°N 86.166732°W
- Owner: Indiana Convention Center & Lucas Oil Stadium

King at Rest is a public artwork by American artist Lorenzo Ghiglieri (1931–2020). It is located near the northwest entrance to the Indiana Convention Center, which is in downtown Indianapolis, Indiana, and is owned by the Indiana Convention Center & Lucas Oil Stadium. The realistic bronze sculpture of a lounging lion was purchased in 2001 by the center.

== Description ==
King at Rest by Lorenzo E. Ghiglieri, is a life-like cast bronze sculpture of a lion perched on a rock. The sculpture is placed near three sculptures by Tom Otterness and across the street from Victory Field. The sculpture has a two-tone patina scheme: the hair of the lion is patinated black, while the body and the rock are patinated brown. The sculpture appears to rest on a concrete base that is approximately the same dimensions as the sculpture (as small amount of the concrete is visible near the back, right leg of the lion; it is unclear if and how the sculpture is attached to the concrete—it may be at rest on the concrete.

== History ==
King at Rest was cast in 1988. The sculpture was installed and acquired by the Indiana Convention Center & Lucas Oil Stadium in 2001.

== See also ==
- Cultural depictions of lions
- List of public art in Indianapolis
