= Sewall Memorial Torches =

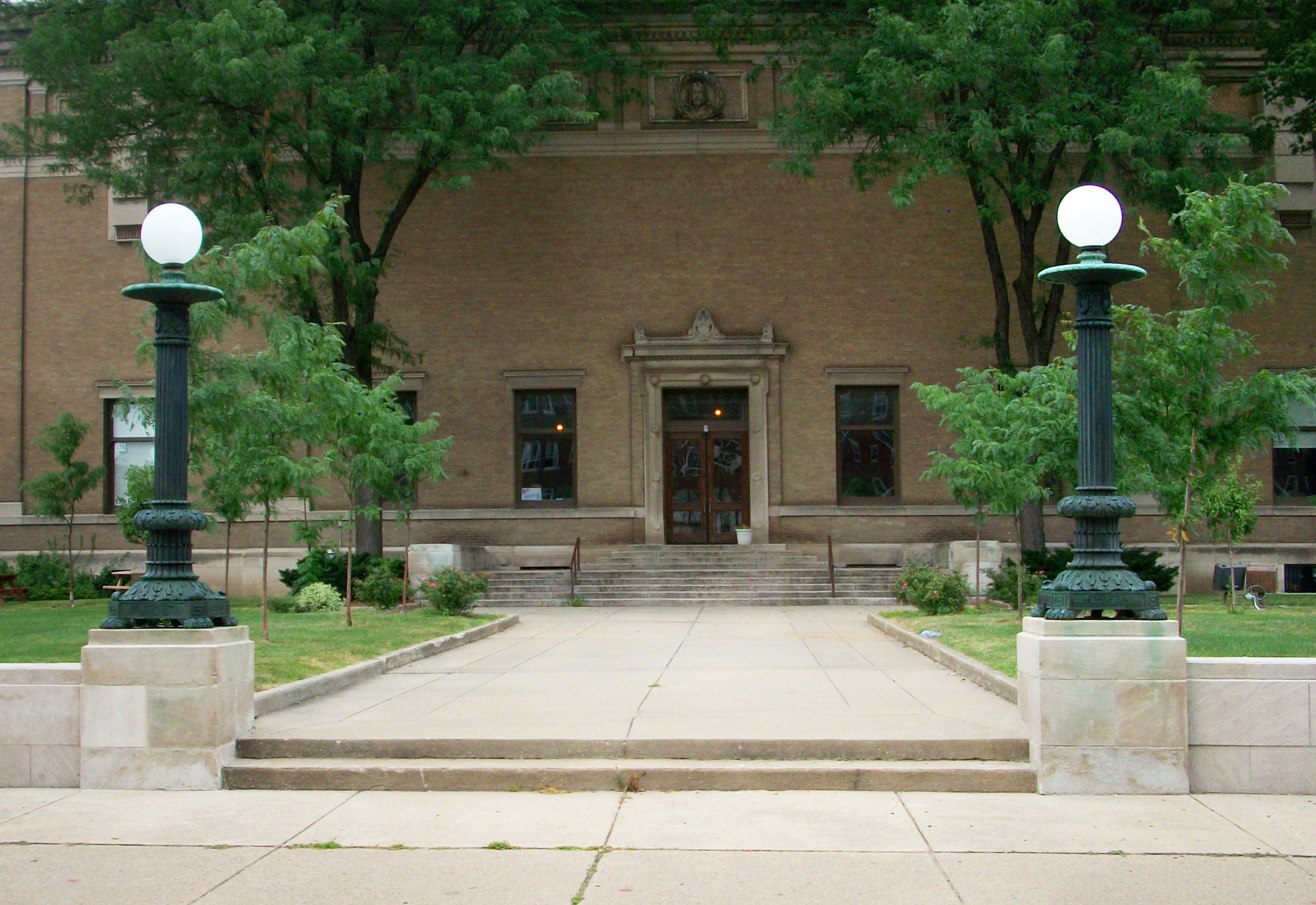
- Artist: Gorham Manufacturing Company
- Year: 1922
- Type: Bronze
- Dimensions: 300 cm × 91 cm × 91 cm (120 in × 36 in × 36 in)
- Location: Herron High School; Indianapolis, Indiana, United States; 39°47′18.9″N 86°9′19″W
- Owner: Indianapolis Museum of Art

The Sewall Memorial Torches are a pair of bronze lampposts built in 1923 in honor of May Wright Sewall, an educator, civic organizer, women's rights activist, and peace movement advocate, who was a founder of the Art Association of Indianapolis in 1883.

The lampposts are owned by the Indianapolis Museum of Art (IMA), and displayed in front of Herron High School, the former site of the Art Association's John Herron Art Institute, at 16th and Pennsylvania streets in the Herron-Morton Place Historic District of downtown Indianapolis. The memorial lampposts were commercially produced by the Gorham Manufacturing Company.

== Description ==
These two ornate lampposts are constructed from multiple pieces of cast bronze that are welded together. A foundry mark on the side of the base indicates that they were made by Gorham Company Founders.

The base is roughly square with angular corners that terminate with symmetrical, three-toed lion's paws. The four paws were cast from the same mold and then welded to the base. The vertical sides of the base, about 4 inches (10 cm) in height, display a Greek key pattern. This is surmounted by a low, conical wreath of acanthus leaves that meets the cylindrical column shaft approximately 6 inches (15 cm) above the vertical sides.

The base is welded to the lower section of the vertical element, which is approximately 12 inches (30 cm) in diameter and 18 inches (46 cm) tall. It is decorated with several tiers of repeating, vertical, leaf-like patterns, topped with a wreath of acanthus leaves projecting outwards approximately 4 inches (10 cm) from the section below it.

The middle section of the vertical element consists of a 9 inches (23 cm)-wide fluted column shaft topped by a capital, rising a total of 6 feet (1.8 m). The capital is adorned with four bucrania (bulls’ skulls) and garlands.

A wide, circular pan about 32 inches (81 cm) in diameter rests atop the capital. This element is decorated with fluting that radiates outward. A small, ornate bronze element is anchored in the center of the pan (remaining mostly out of view from the ground), and acts as a support to the light fixture and globe. Electrical hardware rests on this and connects the globes to the lamp structure. The spherical globes, which were purchased by the IMA in 2010, are made of translucent white plastic and measure 2 feet (0.61 m) in diameter.

The torches are identical except for inscriptions on the front of each base. The lamppost on the west side of the walkway reads:

MAY WRIGHT SEWALL
BORN GREENFIELD, WIS., MAY 27, 1844
DIED INDIANAPOLIS, IND., JULY 22, 1920
"LEAD KINDLY LIGHT"

The lamppost to the east reads:

IN GRATEFUL MEMORY OF
MAY WRIGHT SEWALL
IN WHOSE WISE AND FARSEEING THOUGHT ORIGINATED
THE IDEA OF AN ART ASSOCIATION OF INDIANAPOLIS

== Historical Information ==
The Sewall memorial is closely linked to the history of the IMA. May Wright Sewall, an Indianapolis educator, civic organizer who was known nationally and internationally for her work as a women's rights activist and peace movement advocate, was the founder of the Art Association of Indianapolis in 1883. The Art Association was the precursor to the IMA. Sewall served as the association's first recording secretary, and as its president from 1893 to 1898. She also helped establish the Art Association's art school, which opened in March 1902 at 16th and Pennsylvania streets. It was later known as the John Herron Art Institute. The cornerstone for the institute's building at 16th and Pennsylvania streets (the present-day Herron High School) was laid on November 25, 1905. Sewall, who established the Girls' Classical School Indianapolis in 1882 with her husband, Theodore Lovett Sewall, was also a founder and active in several civic and cultural organizations in the city, most notably the Indianapolis Woman's Club and the Indianapolis Propylaeum.

In May 1923, three years after Sewall's death in July 1920, the Art Association honored her contributions to Indianapolis culture with the dedicated of the two torches, which were erected outside what was then the John Herron Art Institute. The art school later became the Herron School of Art and Design, and is located on the Indiana University - Purdue University Indianapolis (IUPUI) campus. The Art Association changed its name to the Indianapolis Museum of Art in 1969, and moved to its current location on Michigan Road in 1970, at which point the torches were put in storage. In 2010 the lampposts were returned to their original location outside the building that houses Herron High School, a public charter school focused on a classical liberal arts education and continues the site's artistic heritage.

== Artist ==
The Gorham Manufacturing Company was founded in 1831 in Providence, Rhode Island. The company began by chiefly manufacturing silver articles, but it developed a Bronze Division in 1890.

== Condition ==
As of 2010, the torches are structurally stable at their restored location; new mounts were bolted into the limestone bases, not directly attached to the torches but merely holding them in place underneath. At the time of this most recent installation the bronze was completely discolored by verdigris and black corrosion film. This splotchy appearance made the overall shape of the lampposts and the designs within the intricate bronze-work difficult to fully appreciate. Thus, the IMA Conservation Department performed a treatment on the torches following installation, thoroughly cleaning away most of the corrosion and applying multiple protective coatings of wax to the torches to protect them from further corrosion.

== See also ==
- List of public art in Indianapolis
