= Mercury and Two Allegorical Figures =

Public artwork in Indianapolis, Indiana, U.S.

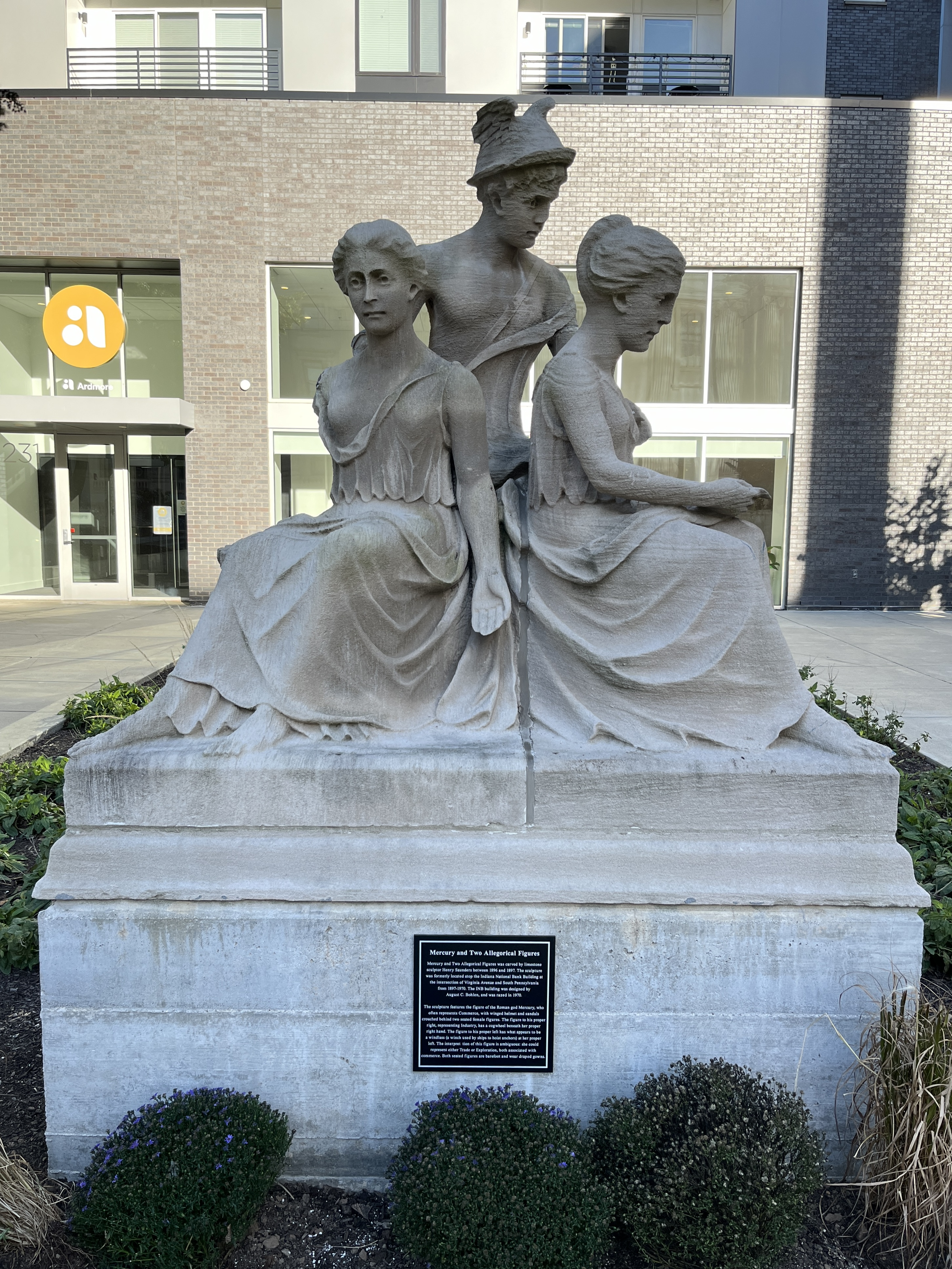
- The sculpture in 2024
- Medium: Limestone sculpture
- Subject: Mercury
- Location: Indianapolis, Indiana, U.S.
- 39°46′14.6″N 86°9′21.1″W

Mercury and Two Allegorical Figures is a public artwork in Indianapolis, Indiana, United States.

== Description ==
The limestone sculpture measures approximately 6 ft. x 70 in. x 53 inches and rests on a concrete base that is 45 x 74 x 59 inches. It depicts Mercury with a winged helmet and sandals, behind two seated allegorical female figures.

== History ==
The work was surveyed by the Smithsonian Institution's "Save Outdoor Sculpture!" program in 1993.

== See also ==
- List of public art in Indianapolis
