= Statue of Richard Lugar =

Public sculpture in Indianapolis, Indiana, US

- The statue in 2024
- Artist: Ryan Feeney
- Medium: Bronze sculpture
- Subject: Richard Lugar
- Location: Indianapolis, Indiana, U.S.; 39°46′2.0″N 86°09′13.6″W

A statue of Richard Lugar by Ryan Feeney is installed in Indianapolis, Indiana.

== Description ==
The memorial is installed at Lugar Plaza outside the Indianapolis City-County Building. The 7-foot-tall bronze statue of Richard Lugar stands in the center of a base that is 2.5 feet tall and 14 feet wide, with multiple free-standing plaques on the surrounds. The figure is shown leaning on a column cap on the base of a walnut tree.

== History ==
Jim Morris launched an effort to memorialize Lugar following his death in 2019. The statue was unveiled during a ceremony attended by hundreds of people at Bicentennial Unity Plaza in 2024.

== See also ==
- List of public art in Indianapolis
