= Colfax Memorial =

Sculpture in Indianapolis, Indiana, U.S.

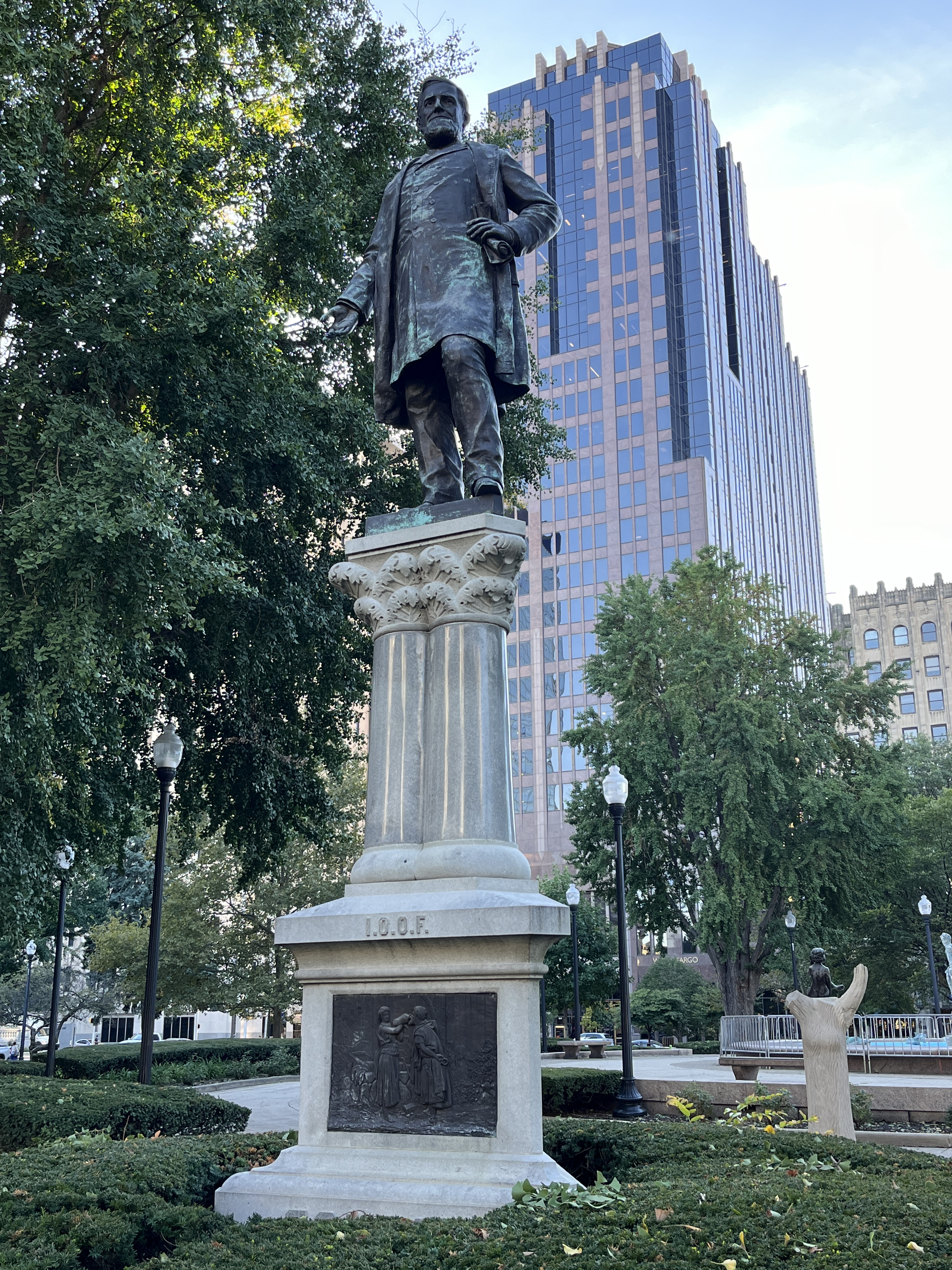
- The statue in 2024
- Medium: Bronze sculpture
- Subject: Schuyler Colfax
- Location: Indianapolis, Indiana, U.S.
- 39.7720°N 86.1567°W

The Colfax Memorial is an outdoor sculpture of Schuyler Colfax, installed in Indianapolis, Indiana.

== Description ==
The Colfax Memorial is installed in the Indiana World War Memorial Plaza's University Park. The bronze sculpture measures approximately 8 ft 4 in (2.54 m) x 2 ft (0.61 m) x 2 ft (0.61 m). and rests on an Oak Hill granite pedestal that measures approximately 11 ft 8 in (3.56 m) x 7.66 ft (2.33 m) x 6.67 ft (2.03 m).

== History ==
According to the Indiana War Memorials Foundation, the statue was the first installed in University Park. The work was surveyed by the Smithsonian Institution's "Save Outdoor Sculpture!" program in 1993.

== See also ==
- List of public art in Indianapolis
