= FDIC International =

Annual firefighting convention held in Indianapolis, Indiana, US

- Genre: Conference & Expo
- Frequency: Annually
- Locations: Indiana Convention Center; Lucas Oil Stadium
- Years active: 1998–2019, 2021–
- Inaugurated: 1998
- Most recent: April 15-20, 2024
- Next event: April 12-17, 2027
- Attendance: 36,000+ (2024)
- Organizer: Clarion Events
- Website: www.fdic.com

FDIC International (Fire Department Instructors Conference) is an annual firefighting conference and exhibition held at the Indiana Convention Center and Lucas Oil Stadium in Indianapolis, Indiana. It is one of Indianapolis's biggest conventions.

== Overview ==
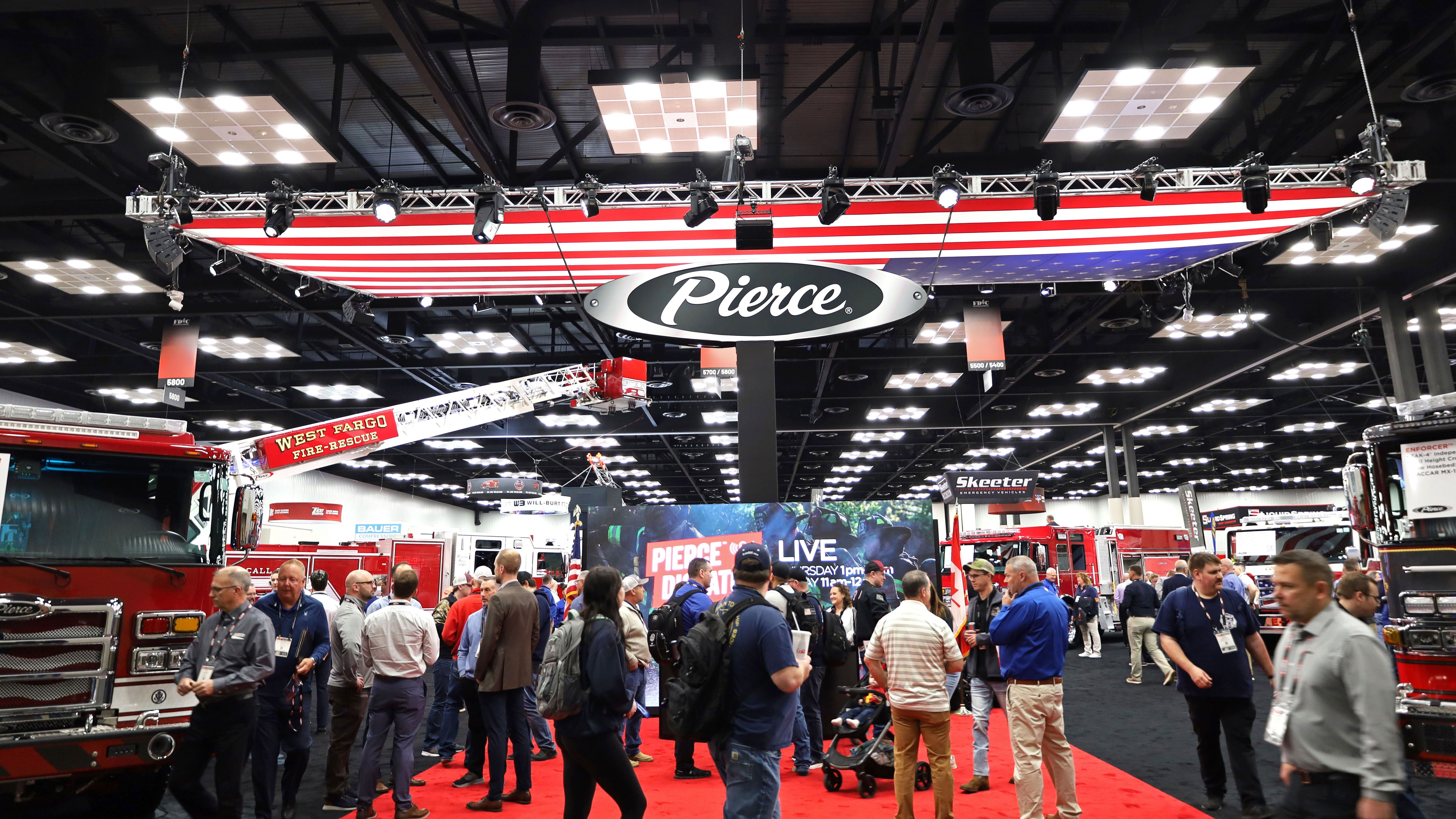
The Pierce Manufacturing Booth at FDIC 2025

The annual expo, organized by Clarion Events and hosted primarily at the Indiana Convention Center, features firefighting apparatus and fire industry technology. In 2016, it was attended by more than 30,000 firefighters, chiefs, officers and instructors from 53 countries.

The conference has an economic impact on Indianapolis of about $35 to US$40 million.

The conference was cancelled in 2020 due to COVID-19. It returned to the Indiana Convention Center and Lucas Oil Stadium in August 2021 with attendance down between 25% and 30%.

It is scheduled to be held in Indianapolis through 2028.

== History ==
The first conference was held in 1929 in Chicago to discuss training measures. By 1939 the attendance had reached a high of 247 people from 28 states as well as Washington, D.C. Early host cities also include Memphis, Tennessee where it was hosted by the Memphis Fire Services and St. Louis hosted by the St. Louis Fire Department. FDICI was established in Indianapolis in 1998.
