= Twisted House =

Sculpture by John McNaughton

- Artist: John McNaughton (sculptor)
- Year: 2005
- Type: Wood
- Location: Indianapolis Art Center, Indianapolis, Indiana, United States; 39°52′43.63″N 86°8′40.01″W
- Owner: Indianapolis Art Center

Twisted House is a public artwork by American artist John McNaughton, and assistant artist Mark Magan. It is installed at the Indianapolis Art Center in Indianapolis, Indiana, United States. Twisted House was installed as part of the center's ARTSPARK initiative.

== Description ==
The sculpture is made of cedar wood and depicts a tall house, bent in such a way that it appears to rest on its foundation and roof. The roof of the house digs into the forest floor and five square, glass windows travel upwards on the house and a distorted door juts to the right, open for viewers to interact with—inside one can step and look out a large window looking out into the forest. The windows each have sills with exterior flower holders and fake wood flowers. The piece sits on natural stone placed in the ground and the dirt of the forest grounds.

== John McNaughton ==
John McNaughton has been teaching woodworking, drawing and sculpture for over 35 years at the University of Southern Indiana. Receiving his Bachelor of Science and Master of Arts at Ball State University and his Master of Fine Arts at Bowling Green State University, he has been awarded two National Endowment for the Arts awards. His art furniture and sculptures reside in the collections of the Smithsonian Institution, the Indianapolis Museum of Art and the White House.

== Acquisition ==
This piece was placed in conjunction with the center's ARTSPARK which brings together art and nature.

== Information ==
According to the Indianapolis Art Center, McNaughton's goal with the work is to show viewers that sculpture can be interactive and touch heavily into the imagination.

Starting in June 2010 IAC hosted a "Community Masterpiece" event designed by artist Vandra Pentecost. The mural consists of seven panels with each one depicting Twisted House in a different artistic style: expressionism, realism, surrealism, American scene painting, cubism, pop art and impressionism. The two panels for pop art and surrealism were completed at the Broad Ripple Art Fair by visitors. In July and August the rest of the panels were completed and the full mural now resides on the Outreach Lawn Wall of the ARTSPARK.

== Reception ==
Roadside America describes Twisted House as "A work of whimsical lopsided outdoor art, suggesting something that's gone terribly wrong at a fairy tale theme park."
