= Slightly Romanesque/Newhall 43 =

Coordinates: 39°52′38.66″N 86°8′30.17″W

- Artist: Robert Curtis (artist)
- Year: 1982
- Type: Concrete, metal
- Location: Indianapolis Art Center; Indianapolis, Indiana, United States
- Owner: Indianapolis Art Center

Slightly Romanesque/Newhall 43 is a public artwork by American artist Robert Curtis. The artwork is on display at and in the collection of the Indianapolis Art Center, in Indianapolis, Indiana, United States.

== About the artist ==
Robert Curtis was born in Susanville, California in 1948. After attending the University of Arizona, Arizona State University, and University of Wisconsin–Milwaukee, Curtis later taught at the University of Wisconsin's architecture school. Curtis lives and works in Chevy Chase, Maryland.
