= Table of Contents (Enochs) =

Limestone sculpture

Coordinates: 39°46.470′N 086°09.971′W

- Artist: Dale Enochs
- Year: 1999
- Type: Limestone
- Dimensions: 13 m × 15 m × 6.1 m (42 ft × 50 ft × 20 ft)
- Location: IUPUI; Indianapolis, Indiana, United States

Table of Contents is a sculpture designed by the American artist Dale Enochs. The sculpture is made from limestone and was commissioned by Joseph F. Miller. The sculpture is located across the street from the IUPUI campus, at the N.E. corner of W Michigan St and West St, and sits in front of the Miller Centre in downtown Indianapolis, Indiana. Table of Contents displays four geometric shapes, which include a circle, triangle, crescent and square. These shapes sit atop a table with four legs, all pieces are carved from limestone. The shapes as well as the table are carved with curved lines which run up and down the sculpture, but some areas are left smooth. The square has "terrae" written on the side. Terrae means extended mass land.

== Acquisition ==
The sculpture was commissioned by Joseph F. Miller and installed, in 1999, at the west entrance of the Miller Centre, which houses The Joseph F Miller Foundation.

== Artist ==
Dale Enochs creates sculpture for both public and private settings. He works primarily in stone often combining contrasting materials such as steel, bronze and copper. His work includes large free standing sculpture, wall sculptures, water features, memorials and architectural elements. It can be seen in public and private collections throughout the US as well as in Japan and China.

Enochs is an internationally known limestone carver who graduated from Indiana University. He lives and works near Bloomington, Indiana. His works vary from large scale outdoor public commissions to delicate wall relief sculpture. His works are included in many private collections and he has created a number of public works. Among these are his works at the White River Gardens in Indianapolis, Prophetstown in Tippecanoe County, and in Takihata, Japan. Additionally, his work in limestone was featured on HGTV as a segment of the show, Modern Masters.

Mr. Enochs was the Lee G. Hall Distinguished Visiting Professor of Art at DePauw University in the fall of 2003.

== Location history ==
The sculpture is located at the entrance to the Miller Centre in downtown Indianapolis, IN. It was installed in 1999.

== See also ==
- Ankhhaf (sculpture)
- Indiana Limestone (sculpture)
- Reserve head
