= Sometimes I Sits =

Michael Helbing artwork

- Artist: Michael Helbing
- Year: 2005
- Medium: Stainless steel
- Location: Indianapolis Art Center; Indianapolis, Indiana, United States; 39.878075°N 86.143422°W
- Owner: Indianapolis Art Center

Sometimes I Sits is a public artwork by American artist Michael Helbing. The artwork, created in 2005, is on display at and in the collection of the Indianapolis Art Center, in Indianapolis, Indiana, United States.

== Description ==
The sculpture is made of welded and polished stainless steel.

== About the artist ==
Mike Helbing grew up in Indiana and the Midwest. As an artist he worked in Indiana through the 70s and 80s and taught children's art classes at the Art Center when it was still the Indianapolis Art League. In the late 80s he moved to Chicago, Illinois and has worked with large metal sculptures ever since. He also serves as curator of the National Vietnam Veterans Art Museum.

== Acquisition ==
This piece was acquired by the Indianapolis Art Center for its ARTSPARK which brings together art and nature. In 2005 the piece was on display in the Lincoln Park neighborhood of Chicago.

== Information ==
Sometimes I Sits is a tribute to Helbing's mother, Pat. The sculpture was inspired by a poster that she had that showed an orangutan sitting. The original title of the piece was Sometimes I sits and thinks and sometimes I just sits. On the piece Helbing states: "It is a place to sit and dream becoming a sculpture that is completed by the participants. It becomes more than the sum of its parts."
