= Broken Walrus II =

- Artist: Gary Freeman
- Year: 1976
- Type: Mild Steel
- Dimensions: 210 cm × 210 cm × 700 cm (84 in × 84 in × 276 in)
- Location: Indianapolis, Indiana, United States
- Owner: Indianapolis Museum of Art

Broken Walrus II, is a public sculpture by American artist Gary Freeman, created in 1976 and located at the Indianapolis Museum of Art, which is near Indianapolis, Indiana, United States. It is made of mild steel and is approximately 84 x 84 x 276 inches. The sculpture has been described by Freeman as looking like a grasshopper.

== Information ==
Broken Walrus II was originally commissioned by Robert Borns of Borns Management for a sculpture garden at the Northern Indianapolis apartment complex Pickwick Place. In 1995 the sculpture was given to the Indianapolis Museum of Art, where it remained for over ten years before it was deaccessioned and disassembled in December 2008.

== See also ==
- Broken Walrus I
