= Ascent the Wind =

- Ascend the Wind
- Artist: Michael Helbing
- Year: 2004
- Type: Stainless steel
- Dimensions: 3.4 m × 3.0 m × 1.5 m (11 ft × 10 ft × 5 ft)
- Location: Indy Art Center; Indianapolis, Indiana, United States; 39°52′40.8″N 86°8′33.72″W

Ascent the Wind is a public artwork by American artist Michael Helbing. The artwork is located in the ARTSPARK grounds of the Indy Art Center, in Indianapolis, Indiana, United States. While the Indy Art Center titles it Ascent the Wind, the artist calls it Ascend the Wind.

== Description ==
Ascent the Wind is an abstract stainless steel sculpture that rests on a concrete base. The artwork curves upwards and shifts in a flowing manner as tentacle-like appendages form off the top section seeming to blow in the wind.

== Acquisition ==
The artwork is on temporary from the Shimmery Gallery and is listed at costing $40,000 for permanent purchase.
