= Gary Freeman (sculptor) =

American sculptor

- Born: October 7, 1937; Wellington, Kansas
- Died: January 6, 2014 (aged 76); Indianapolis, Indiana
- Education: BFA, Kansas City Art Institute; MFA, Tulane University
- Known for: Sculpture

Gary Freeman (1937–2014) was an American sculptor from Indianapolis, Indiana. He was Professor Emeritus of Indiana University-Purdue University Indianapolis (IUPUI) and served as head of the Herron School of Art Sculpture Department for 33 years, from 1968 until his retirement in 2001.

Freeman was born in Wellington, Kansas. He received his BFA in 1961 from the Kansas City Art Institute. He received his MFA in 1963 from Tulane University. Between 1975 and 1990 Freeman received seven public and private art commissions, including Indianapolis companies such as Indiana Energy Inc., Indianapolis Heliport Corporation, Indianapolis Art Center and Borns Management Company. He also received seven grants, including one to study Stainless Steel Production Methods in Mexico and throughout Europe. His work is in 23 public and private collections, including the Indianapolis Museum of Art, New Orleans Museum of Art, Kalamazoo Institute of Arts, and the Newcomb Art School, Tulane University.

For over three decades Freeman proved to be a prolific artist in the Midwest and beyond. Indianapolis Star journalist Marcus B. Chandler declared, "Freeman has come as close as any artist living in Indianapolis to achieving a national reputation in contemporary fine arts."

== Career ==
From 1966 to 1968 Freeman was the head of the sculpture program at Kalamazoo Art Center in Kalamazoo, Michigan. In 1968 he was hired as professor and chair of the Sculpture Department at the Herron School of Art at Indiana University-Purdue University of Indianapolis (IUPUI) due to his expertise in metal casting. In addition to heading the Sculpture Department, Freeman was also tasked with creating a bronze foundry for students. Freeman hoped that the foundry would allow students a more hands-on experience with metal sculpture, allowing them to experiment with various methods and materials that they might not otherwise have access to. His vision was for students to be able to utilize a casting system in order to control the production of metal sculpture through the entire process. Freeman believed, "A sculptor's success with bronze pieces can depend upon availability of such facilities." In an interview with the Indianapolis Star, Freeman stated, "I have learned that with a metal casting system, a sculptor seeks more and more to control production of a piece of metal sculpture beginning with modeling through the finishing process. As an artist, I can not find anyone to process my work the way I would like to do it. I can't blueprint my pieces."

Sculpture is a life of exploration, whether it be figurative or non-representational. Only by exploring the many facets can a trained artist find his aspirations.

—Gary Freeman, January 1970

In January 1970, after 16 months of preparation converting a radiator shop into an operational facility, Freeman debuted the new foundry with a demonstration of a metal casting for students and faculty. Freeman had acquired all of the tools for carving, casting and building sculptures, from a pair of crucible furnaces, to a walk-in kiln, welding equipment, and sandmillers, grinders, and drills.

Freeman remained the head of the Sculpture Department at IUPUI until retiring in 2001. In his 33 years at IUPUI he had been integral in the growth of Herron's sculpture program. In addition to spearheading the opening of the foundry in 1970, he also assisted in the design of Herron's new sculpture and ceramics building at 1350 Indiana Avenue.

A number of Freeman's sculptures have been commissioned by Indianapolis businesses and institutions. Some of these include Monumentalment IV at the Indianapolis Art Center and For Endless Trees at the WFYI Building. Broken Walrus I was formerly found on the IUPUI campus. The Indianapolis Museum of Art (IMA) included two of Freeman's pieces in their collection. In 1983 the IMA accessioned an Untitled bronze and aluminum relief, which was created between 1971 and 1972. The IMA later acquired the larger sculpture, Broken Walrus II, as a gift from Robert A. Borns.

== Major themes ==
Throughout his career, Freeman has used precision to create, "meticulously machined and geometrically solved" pieces. Fellow IUPUI professor, artist, and art critic Steve Mannheimer described Freeman's work as a "search for the nearly accidental, the unplanned and irregular, the search for the found, the creation of the done rather than the considered." Freeman's pieces are characterized by structural themes, producing the "problem of support versus supported, braces and brackets coinciding and/or conflicting with free form masses." Freeman utilizes the bases of his sculptures to define the space, brace the work, and anchor it to the ground to make it seem monumental. Freeman has been praised for his, "extraordinary sense of scale and fine awareness of the relationship among size, proportion and weight," which allows for the interplay of these elements to "impact and compose his statement."

== Exhibitions ==
Gary Freeman has been featured in many exhibitions throughout Indiana, as well as Louisville, Kentucky, Milwaukee, Wisconsin, and Chicago, Illinois. His pieces have been featured in multiple shows in the Herron Gallery, IUPUI, including Sculpture Indiana: Breath and Beauty in 1980 and Boundaries, 1989. Solo shows have included Recent Sculpture: Gary Freeman at the Washington Gallery, Indianapolis, in 1979 and more recently Gary Freeman: Small Sculpture from the Evaporation Series at the Shircliff Gallery Of Art, Vincennes University, Indiana, in 2001.

Gary Freeman: A Decade of Sculpture 1979 to 1989 was a retrospective exhibit held at the Herron Galleries at IUPUI from January 19 to February 21, 1990. The collection featured 44 works, including zinc plated steel, copper plated steel, painted steel, and painted wood. A variety of Freeman's series were included in the exhibition. The "Low Profile" series, featured minimal, abstract pieces such as Sally's Jams (1982) and Cadinza's Hill (1982). The "A.U.L" series (1985) included sculptures created for the American United Life Company competition, which were made to seem as if the pieces were in mid-fall. The "Table Statements" series (1987–1989) were functional furniture pieces suggestive of landscapes.
