= Monumentalment IV =

- Artist: Gary Freeman
- Year: 1981
- Type: Steel
- Dimensions: 690 cm × 390 cm × 48 cm (270 in × 154 in × 19 in)
- Location: Indianapolis Art Center; Indianapolis, Indiana, United States; 39°52′41″N 86°8′42″W
- Owner: Indianapolis Art Center

Monumentalment IV is a public sculpture by American artist Gary Freeman. Commissioned in 1979, it was installed in 1981 on the grounds of the Indianapolis Art Center, formerly the Indianapolis Art League, in Indianapolis, Indiana, United States. The sculpture was surveyed in 1992 as a part of the Smithsonian's Save Outdoor Sculpture! program. In the mid-1990s the work was relocated to the west side of the IAC's grounds and became part of its ARTSPARK, an outdoor sculpture garden.

== Description ==
The sculpture, which measures approximately 270 x 154 x 19 in., is painted red-orange metal and thrusts "upward from a rectangular concrete base" measuring 42 x 114 x 34 in. The work of "irregularly shaped triangles and rectangles" is "bolted to the base with curved tubes."

A plaque near the artwork is inscribed:

GARY FREEMAN
MONUMENTALMENT IV
1981

This sculpture is among the 27 artworks in the IAC's ARTSPARK, which "brings art, artists and the community together through interactive sculptures in an open–air setting."

== History ==
In 1979 the Indianapolis Art League, the former name of the Indianapolis Art Center, commissioned Freeman to construct Monumentalment IV using both public and private funds. Completed in 1981, the art league installed the piece in front of its building on east Sixty-seventh Street. In the mid-1990s the sculpture was moved to the west lawn of the Indianapolis Arts Center grounds.

The sculpture was surveyed in November 1992 as part of the Save Outdoor Sculpture! program and was described as needing treatment.
