= St. Vincent (Indianapolis) =

- Year: 1983
- Type: Marble
- Dimensions: 180 cm × 61 cm × 61 cm (6 ft × 2 ft × 2 ft); 2 ft × 2.5 ft × 2.5 ft (61 cm × 76 cm × 76 cm) base
- Location: Indianapolis, Indiana, United States; 39°54′31″N 86°11′34″W
- Owner: St. Vincent Indianapolis Hospital

St. Vincent is a 1983 public artwork by an unknown artist located on the grounds of St. Vincent Indianapolis Hospital in Indianapolis, Indiana, United States. The sculpture sits in front of the entrance to an annex building and is made of marble and sits on a granite base. The sculpture depicts a standing Vincent de Paul holding a sleeping baby wrapped in a blanket in his proper right arm, the baby's hand rests on the monk's chest. To his side is a young girl holding the front of her dress up with her proper left hand. She is wearing a small locket around her neck as she looks up at the saint. The sculpture stands 6 feet tall. This piece was surveyed by the Save Outdoor Sculpture! in 1993.
