= Equipoise 14 =

- Year: 1992
- Type: Lacquered aluminum
- Dimensions: 6.1 m (20 ft)
- Location: Indianapolis, Indiana, United States; 39°55′45″N 86°9′06″W

Equipoise 14, is a public artwork by American artist Lyle London in an office park which is in Indianapolis, Indiana, United States. The sculpture is made of lacquered aluminum. The piece stands at 20 feet high and features three shapes that appear to be swirling that are balanced on top of a curled shaft. The shaft sits on a base that is circular. Equipoise 14 sits in front of an office building on the northside of the city. It was installed in 1992 and dedicated in September of that year. This sculpture is one of an edition of six. Equipoise 6 is on display at the Shemer Art Center and Museum.

A smaller version of the sculpture was produced, in bronze, by London.

== Description ==
A plaque sits just to the south of the sculpture which states: EQUIPOSE 15/Equipose (i*kwipoiz) - A condition of perfect balance or equilibrium./Aluminium sculpture/by/Lyle London/Installed on September 15, 1992. The name of the sculpture is misspelled on the plaque.
