= V Shaped Abstract Sculpture =

- Year: c. 1960
- Type: Concrete
- Dimensions: 2.1 m × 2.1 m × 1.8 m (7 ft × 7 ft × 6 ft)
- Location: Indianapolis, Indiana, United States; 39°49′41″N 86°6′46″W

V Shaped Abstract Sculpture, is a public artwork by an unknown artist located at the Pentecostal Assemblies of the World headquarters in Indianapolis, Indiana, United States. The sculpture sits in front of the entrance to the building and is made of concrete. The piece has two large separate concrete forms that appear to be growing from the ground and separate halfway into an abstract v-shaped form. The piece stands at 7 × 7 × 6 feet. The building dates from the 1960s and it is believed that the piece was installed during that period. The piece was originally in the collection of Leo Lippman.
