= Ryan Feeney =

University administrator and former GAA official

- Occupation: University administrator
- Employer: Queen's University Belfast
- Title: Vice-President and Registrar

Ryan Feeney is a university administrator and former Gaelic Athletic Association (GAA) official from County Londonderry, Northern Ireland. He is registrar and the vice-president for governance and external affairs at Queen's University Belfast, and the member of the University Management Board with responsibility for governance, administration and external affairs.

Feeney previously held senior roles with Ulster GAA, served as an independent member of the Northern Ireland Policing Board from 2011 to 2018 and was Director of Strategic Communications and Engagement at the Police Service of Northern Ireland (PSNI).

== Early life and education ==
Feeney is from Faughanvale, County Londonderry, and trained as a teacher.

He studied education, business and history at St Mary's University College, Belfast. He later completed a doctorate in governance through the Institute of Public Administration and the National University of Ireland, with research examining the operation and functions of the Strand Two institutions created by the Belfast/Good Friday Agreement. Feeney has also served as a visiting professor of governance and public policy at Ulster University.

== Career ==
=== Ulster GAA and Policing Board ===
Feeney worked for the Ulster Council of the GAA for approximately ten years. He became Head of Community and Public Affairs, with responsibility for areas including communications, marketing and commercial activity.

In 2011, Feeney was appointed as an independent member of the Northern Ireland Policing Board. He was reappointed in 2015 for a further four-year term. He remained on the board until 2018.

Feeney left Ulster GAA at the end of 2015 to become Head of Public Engagement at Queen's University Belfast.

=== Queen's University Belfast and PSNI ===
In December 2018 it was announced that Feeney would leave Queen's to become head of communications at the PSNI. He took up the position of Director of Strategic Communications and Engagement in 2019.

In September 2021, it was announced that he would leave the PSNI and return to Queen's University Belfast. He subsequently served as Director of Civic Engagement and Social Responsibility at Queen's.

In June 2023, Feeney was appointed vice-president for Strategic Engagement and External Affairs at Queen's. His role later became vice-president, Governance and External Affairs and Registrar. As Registrar, he serves as secretary to the university's Senate and Academic Council. His portfolio includes governance, civic engagement, strategic communications, research and enterprise, alumni engagement and philanthropy, and government engagement.

=== Other appointments ===
In 2026, Feeney was appointed by the Irish Minister for Further and Higher Education, Research, Innovation and Science to the board of the Higher Education Authority. He serves on its Research and Systems Development subcommittees.

He also serves on the board of the Centre for Cross Border Cooperation, is a trustee of Politics in Action and has served on the council of the British Irish Chamber of Commerce.

== Personal life ==
Feeney is married.
