= Indiana Convention Center =

Convention center in Indianapolis, Indiana, US

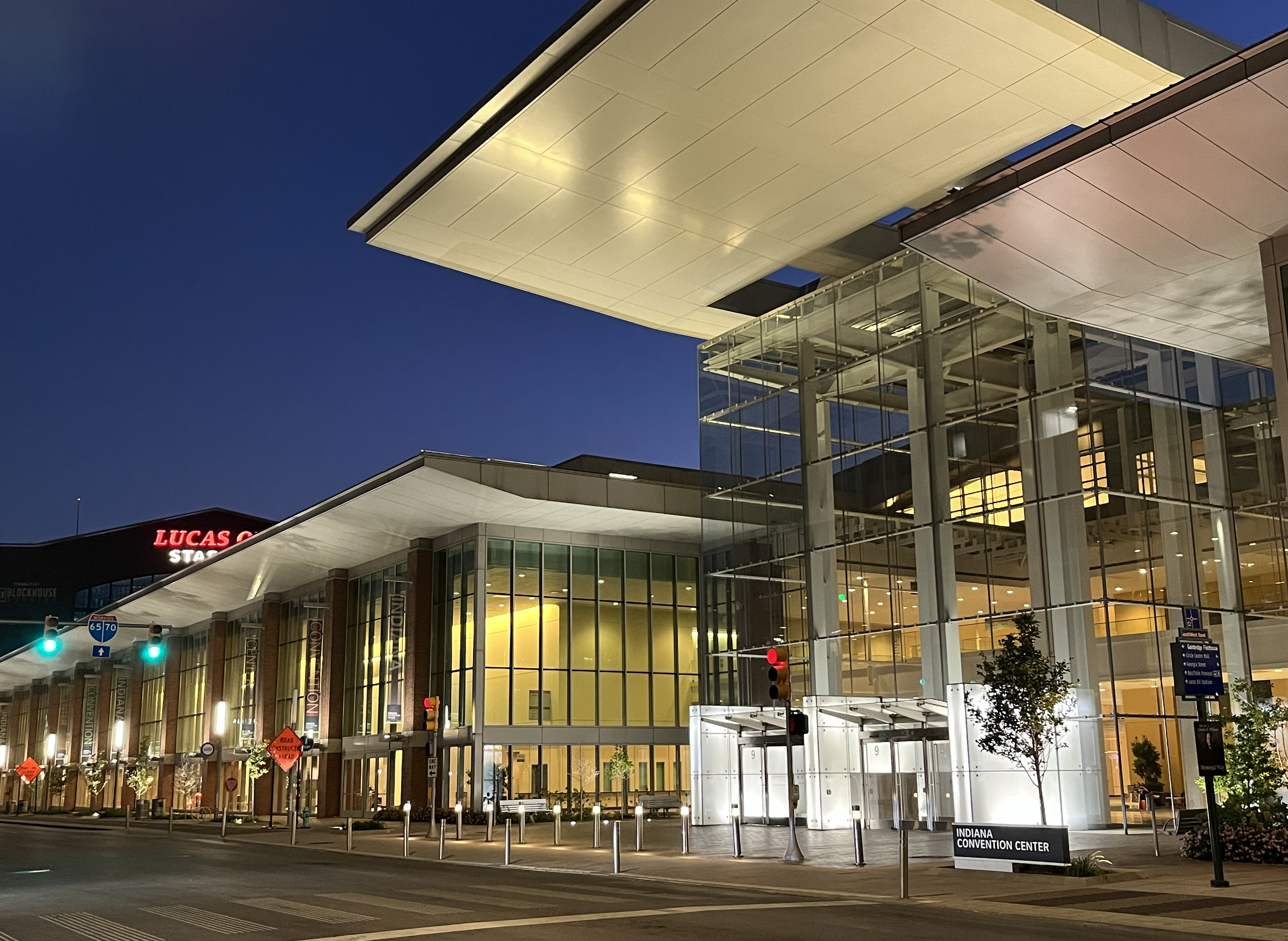
- Indiana Convention Center at Georgia Street in 2024
- Interactive map of Indiana Convention Center
- Former names: Indiana Convention-Exposition Center
- Address: 100 South Capitol Avenue
- Location: Indianapolis, Indiana, U.S.
- Coordinates: 39°45′55″N 86°9′45″W
- Owner: Indiana Stadium and Convention Building Authority (State of Indiana)
- Operator: Capital Improvement Board of Managers of Marion County, Indiana
- Public transit: 8, 24

Construction
- Built: 1969–1972
- Opened: 1972; 54 years ago
- Expanded: 1984, 1993, 2000, 2011

Website
- icclos.com

The Indiana Convention Center is a major convention center located in Downtown Indianapolis, Indiana, United States. The original structure was completed in 1972 and has undergone five expansions. In total, there are 71 meeting rooms, 11 exhibit halls, and three multi-purpose ballrooms. The connected facilities of Lucas Oil Stadium offer an additional 183,000 square feet (20,000 m^{2}) of exhibit space and 12 meeting rooms.

== History ==
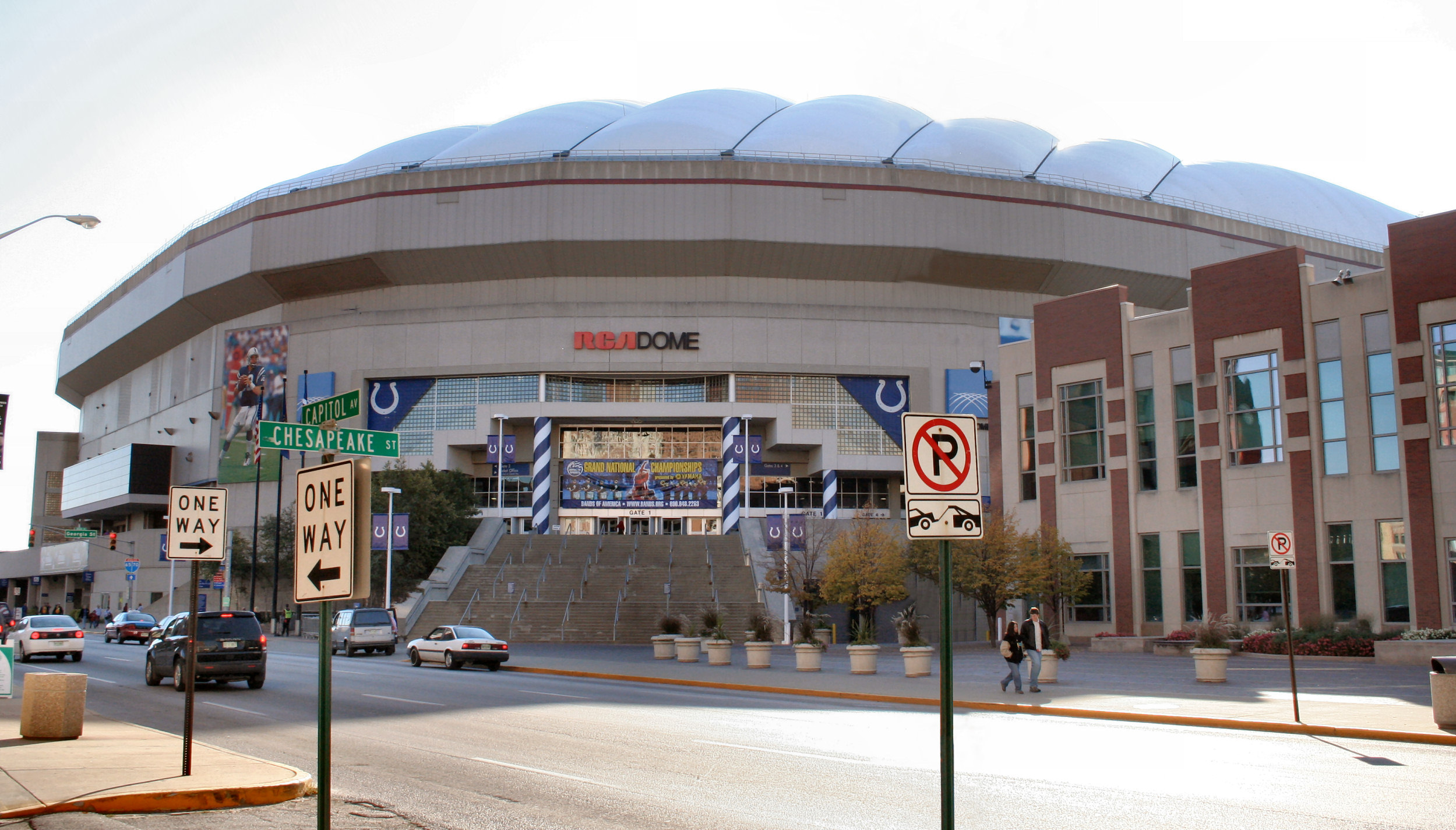
RCA Dome and 1993 convention center expansion

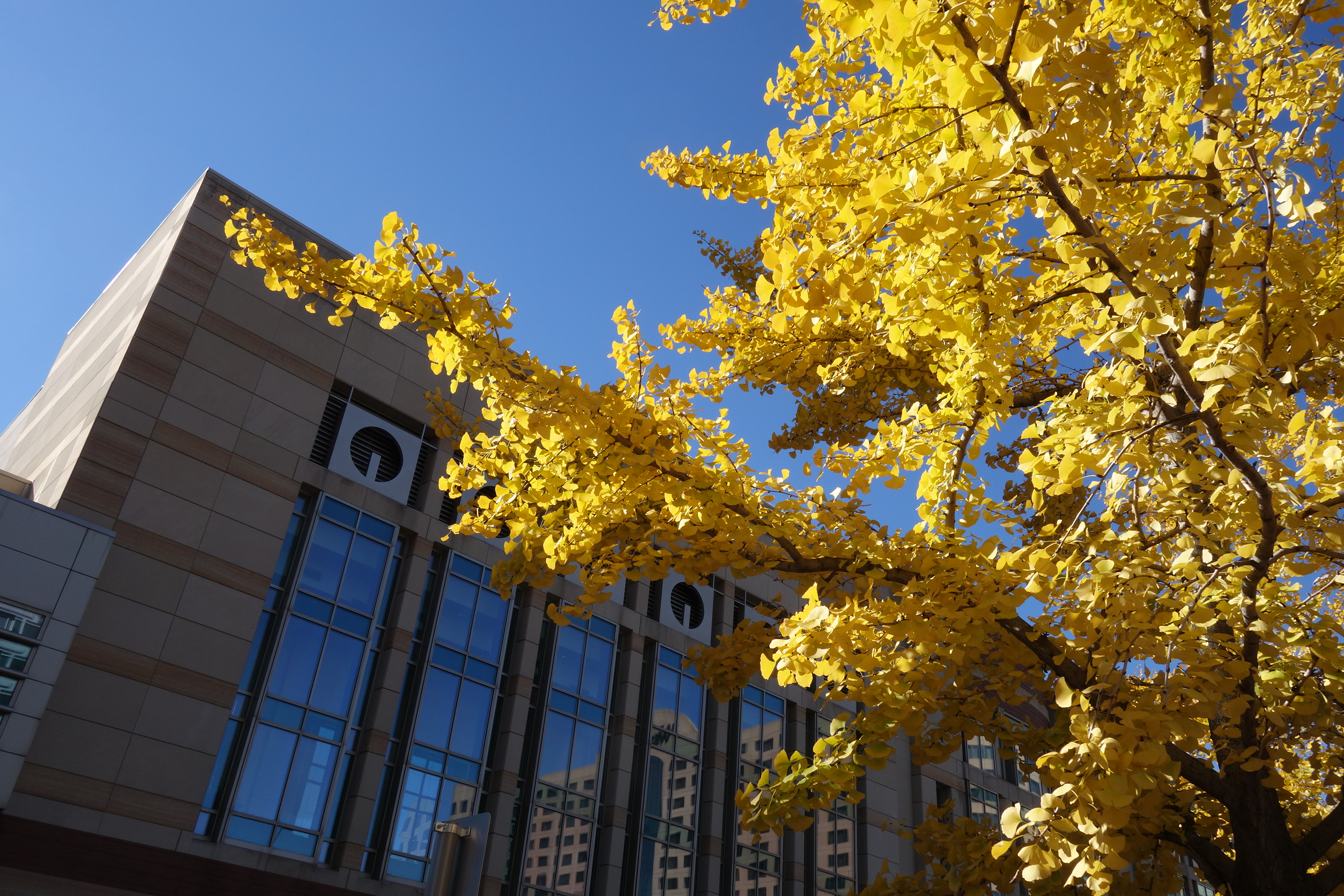
Indiana Convention Center from Maryland Street in 2015

Originally named the Indiana Convention-Exposition Center, groundbreaking for the $26.1 million venue occurred December 8, 1969. Completed in 1972, the original project included one ballroom, three exhibition halls, and 23 meeting rooms encompassing 160,000 square feet (15,000 m^{2}). The first major expansion to the Indiana Convention Center added one ballroom, two exhibit halls, and 16 meeting rooms, increasing total rentable space to 371,000 square feet (34,500 m^{2})—concurrent with construction of the adjoining 60,500-seat Hoosier Dome, later renamed the RCA Dome, both completed in 1984. The combined cost was around $94.7 million.

The convention center was expanded again from 1992 to 1993. The $43 million two-story addition increased total rentable space to 419,000 square feet (38,900 m^{2}), with the additions of the Sagamore Ballroom and 16 meeting rooms. The project also included skywalk connections to the Westin Indianapolis and Hyatt Regency Indianapolis (via Plaza Park Garage). Another expansion followed in 2000. The addition of a ballroom, two exhibit halls, and seven meeting rooms increased the total rentable space to 539,000 square feet (50,100 m^{2}). The project included a skywalk connection to the Indianapolis Marriott Downtown.

Construction of the 67,000-seat Lucas Oil Stadium began in September 2005 one block south of the RCA Dome. Opening in August 2008, the $720 million stadium contains approximately 183,000 square feet (17,000 m^{2}) of exhibition space. Upon completion of Lucas Oil Stadium, the RCA Dome was demolished. The iconic air-lifted dome was deflated and the implosion of the stadium was completed in December 2008.

The convention center's most recent and largest expansion was undertaken from 2008 to 2010, opening in January 2011. A 400,000-square-foot (37,000 m^{2}) addition was constructed on the site of the former RCA Dome, costing $275 million. As part of the expansion, an underground walkway along the west side of Capitol Avenue was built to connect this new portion of the facility to Lucas Oil Stadium. A skywalk was also built to connect the convention center with the JW Marriott Indianapolis (via the Government Center Washington Street Parking Facility), which was completed in 2011. Ratio Architects, Inc. was the lead architectural firm for the expansion, assisted by other Indiana companies, BSA LifeStructures, Blackburn Architects, and Domain Architecture Inc. Indianapolis-based Shiel Sexton Co. Inc. was the lead construction manager, in association with Powers & Sons Construction Company Inc.

In addition to its space, the Indiana Convention Center now possesses 49 loading docks, seven drive-in ramps, and three food courts. It is also connected to 12 hotels and 4,700 hotel rooms via skywalks, the most of any U.S. convention center.

In September 2020, Indianapolis City-County Council unanimously approved a $155 million bond measure to build a 50,000-square-foot (4,600 m^{2}) ballroom, 93,500 square feet (8,690 m^{2}) of meeting and pre-function space, and two high-rise hotels developed by Kite Realty, totaling 1,400 rooms. The first hotel, branded as a Signia by Hilton, is planned to be completed in 2024. According to the Indianapolis Star and Indianapolis Business Journal, this is the fifth major expansion of the Indiana Convention Center and would push the total rentable space to more than 1,000,000 square feet (93,000 m^{2}).

== Notable events ==
The Indiana Convention Center has been the host to a large variety of events, including concerts, conventions, meetings, pageants, sports competitions, and trade shows.

=== Annual events ===
- Big Ten Football Championship Game Fan Fest
- FDIC International (1994–present)
- Gen Con (2003–present)
- Indiana Black Expo Summer Celebration
- Indiana Comic Con (2014–present)
- Indianapolis Auto Show
- National FFA Convention & Expo (2006–2012, 2016–present)
- Performance Racing Industry Trade Show (1998–2004, 2013–present)
- PopCon Indy (2014–present)

=== Past events ===
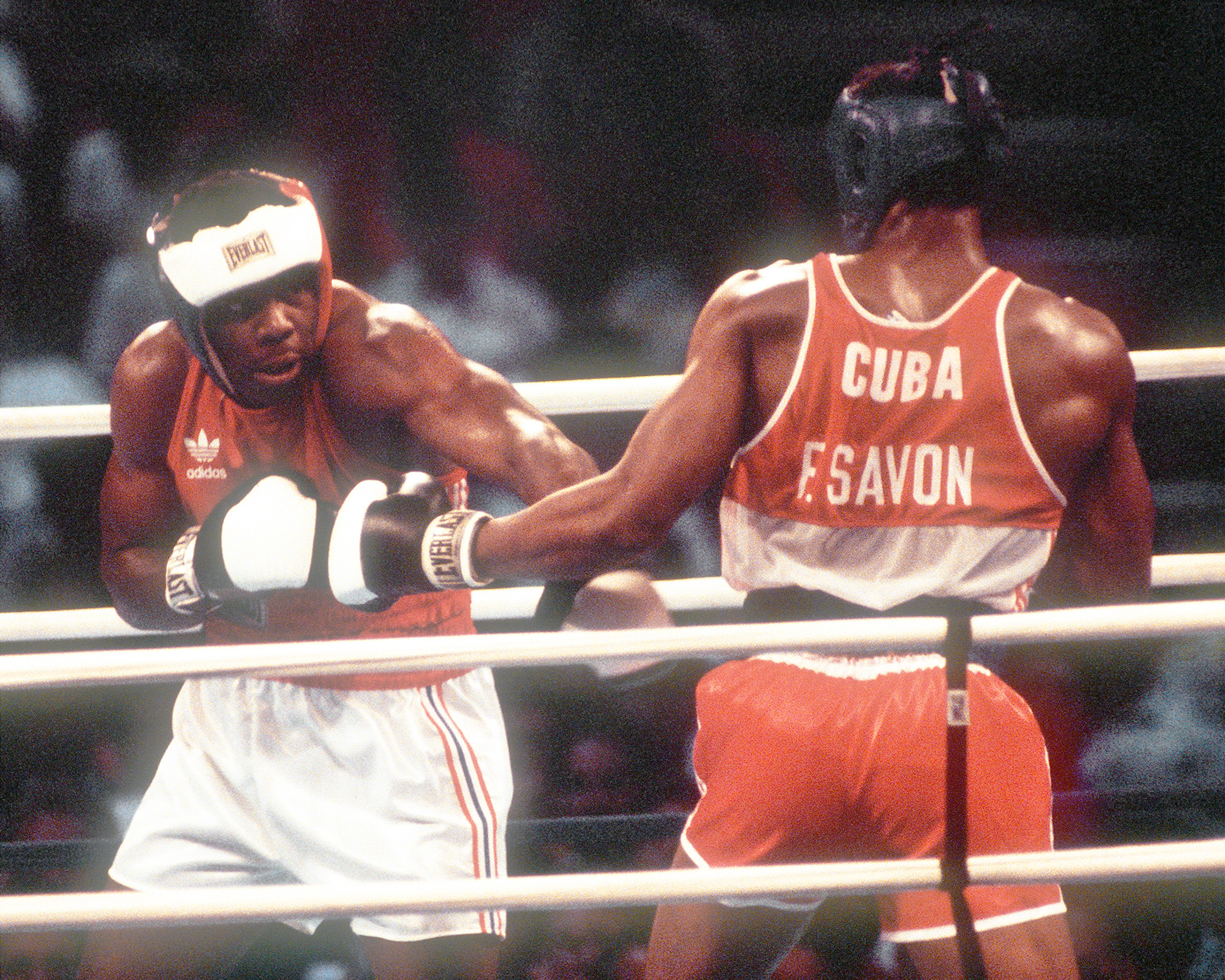
Representing the United States, Michael Bentt comes at his Cuban opponent, Félix Savón, with a right jab during a bout at the X Pan American Games in August 1987.

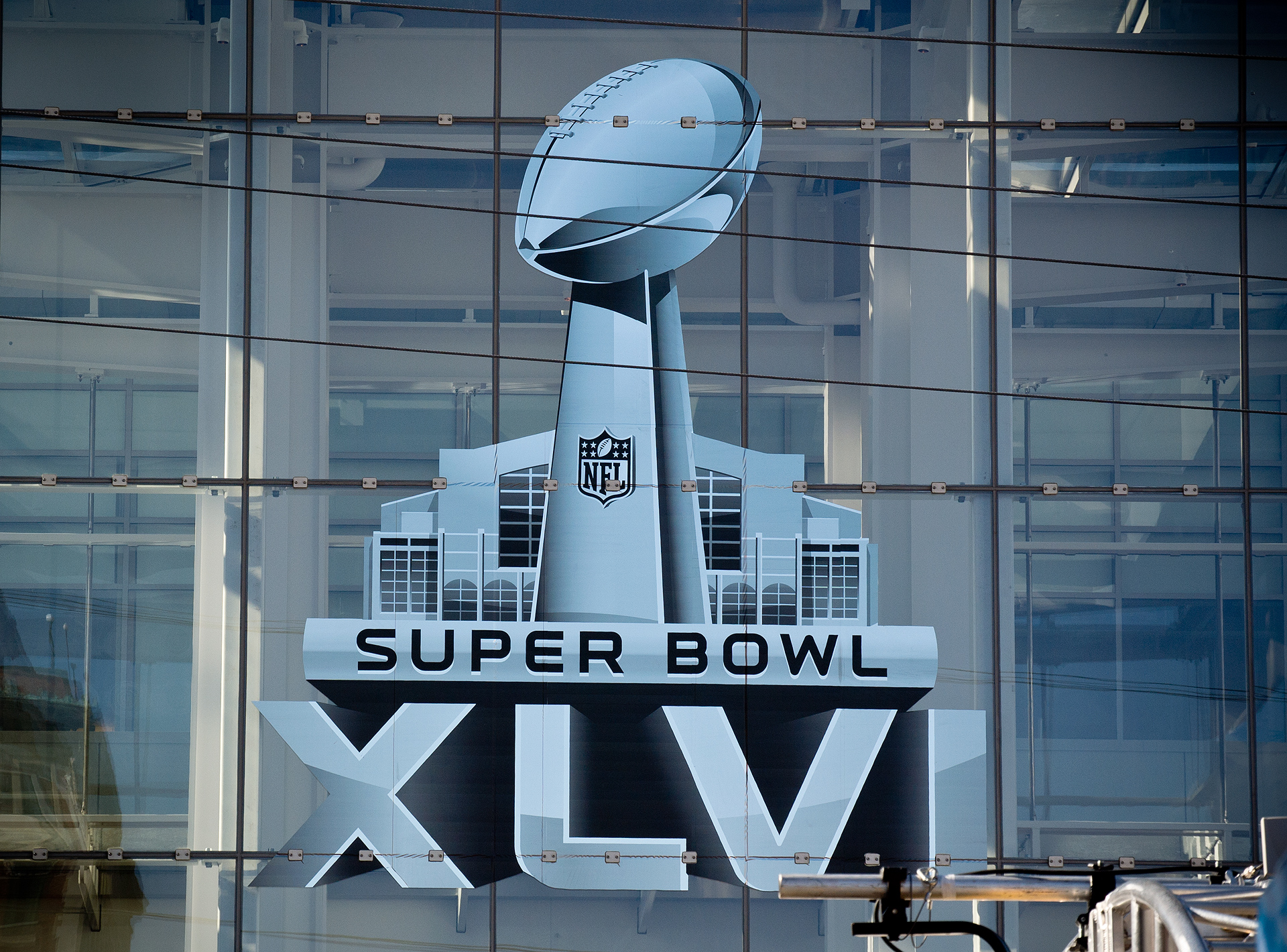
The Indiana Convention Center hosted the Super Bowl Experience leading to Super Bowl XLVI in 2012.

- Dressed to Kill Tour (Kiss) (April and August 1975)
- Miss Gay America (September 1986)
- 1987 Pan American Games (August 1987)
  - Boxing
  - Fencing
  - Field Hockey
  - Modern Pentathlon
  - Rhythmic Gymnastics
- General Council of the Assemblies of God (August 2000)
- Antiques Roadshow (2001 and 2016)
- Star Wars Celebration II (May 2002)
- USA Wrestling 2003 Senior World Team Trials (June 2003)
- Star Wars Celebration III (April 2005)
- NCAA Bracket Town (April 2010)
- NFL Super Bowl Experience (January–February 2012)
- NCAA Final Four Fan Fest (April 2015)
- NCAA Tourney Town
  - Women's Basketball Final Four (March–April 2011)
  - Women's Basketball Final Four (March–April 2016)
- National Rifle Association
  - 143rd Annual Meetings & Exhibits (April 2014)
  - 148th Annual Meetings & Exhibits (April 2019)
- Church of the Nazarene
  - 2013 General Assembly and Conventions (June 2013)
  - 2017 General Assembly and Conventions (June 2017)
- NFL Scouting Combine Experience (2017 and 2018)
- United Pentecostal Church International
  - UPCI General Conference 1991
  - UPCI General Conference 2016
  - North American Youth Congress (2017)
  - UPCI General Conference 2019
  - UPCI General Conference 2021
  - UPCI General Conference 2023
- Church of God In Christ Auxiliaries in Ministry Convention (2018)
- National Catholic Youth Conference (1991, 2001, 2011, 2013, 2015, 2017, 2019)
- 2021 NCAA Division I men's basketball tournament (March–April 2021)
- 10th National Eucharistic Congress (United States) (July 2024)

== Public art ==
- Female Tourist – Public artwork by American artist Tom Otterness
- Free Money – Public artwork by American artist Tom Otterness
- King at Rest – Public artwork by American artist Lorenzo Ghiglieri
- Male Tourist – Public artwork by American artist Tom Otterness

== See also ==
- List of convention centers in the United States
- List of attractions and events in Indianapolis
