= For Endless Trees =

Public sculpture by Gary Freeman

- Artist: Gary Freeman
- Year: 1991
- Type: Cor-Ten steel
- Dimensions: 490 cm × 160 cm × 120 cm (192 in × 63 in × 48 in)
- Location: Indianapolis, Indiana, United States; 39°47′22″N 86°9′27″W
- Owner: WFYI

For Endless Trees, or For Endless Trees IV, is a public sculpture by American artist Gary Freeman. It is located in front of the WFYI office building in Indianapolis, Indiana, United States. The Cor-Ten steel sculpture consists of four vertical beams, grouped closely together, that branch out at the top. It measures approximately sixteen feet tall, five feet wide and four feet deep. The sculpture was commissioned by the Indiana Gas Company in 1991 for their offices at 1600 North Meridian Street. This location is now home to WFYI.
