= Immaculate Heart of Mary (The Fatima Group) =

- Our Lady of Fatima (English)
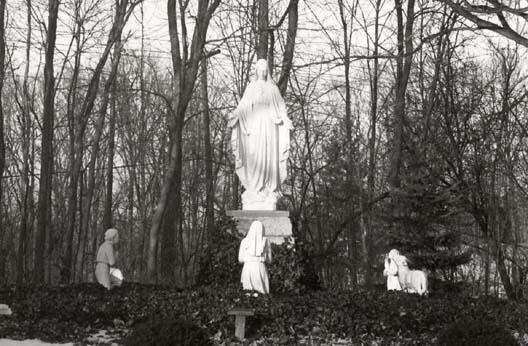
- Year: 1966
- Medium: Bianco Derville marble Fabricator: Enrico Pandolfine Group
- Dimensions: 180 cm × 71 cm × 41 cm (72 in × 28 in × 16 in)
- Location: Indianapolis, United States; 39°51′16″N 86°4′40″W
- Owner: Archdiocese of Indianapolis

Immaculate Heart of Mary is a public artwork by Italian fabricator the Enrico Pandolfine Group, located at Fatima Retreat House in Indianapolis, Indiana, United States. Immaculate Heart of Mary was originally surveyed as part of the Smithsonian's Save Outdoor Sculpture! survey in 1994. This sculpture collection serves as a place of reflection for guests of the Catholic retreat center.

== Description ==
This sculpture group consists of six figures. A full-length sculpture of Mary is the centerpiece sculpture. Wearing long robes with a head veil she stands barefoot with the sacred heart with her hands extended at her sides. Made of marble, Mary is placed on a mortared stone base with a limestone caps. Surrounding Mary are three children a lamb and a sheep. On her proper right is a little girl gazing up at Mary. In the center is a young boy on his knees, praying and looking upwards at her as well. Directly in front of Mary is a young woman also on her knees, praying, with her head bowed. A sheep stands next to the young girls proper right and a smaller lamb sits next to the boy on his proper left.

== Acquisition ==
All of the figures were sculpted in Pietrasanta, Italy by the Enrico Pandolfine Group. The piece was given to the retreat center by Miss Frances Landwerlen on behalf of Louis and Monica Landwerlen, the set cost $1,928.50.

== Information ==
Originally the set was described as The Fatima Group, however it is now generally referred to as the Immaculate Heart of Mary since Mary does not represent the vision of Our Lady of Fátima.

== Condition ==
This sculpture was surveyed in 1993 for its condition and it was described as needing treatment.
