= Truman Lowe =

Ho-Chunk artist

- Born: Truman Lowe; January 19, 1944; Black River Falls, Wisconsin
- Died: March 30, 2019 (aged 75); Madison, Wisconsin
- Education: B.S. University of Wisconsin–La Crosse, M.F.A. University of Wisconsin–Madison
- Patrons: Eiteljorg Museum of American Indians and Western Art, Museum of Wisconsin Art, National Museum of the American Indian, Indianapolis Art League, John Lavine, Denver Art Museum, Peabody Essex Museum

Truman Tennis Lowe (January 19, 1944 – March 30, 2019) (Ho-Chunk) was an American sculptor and installation artist. A professor of fine art at the University of Wisconsin, Lowe also served as a curator of contemporary art at the National Museum of the American Indian. He is known for large site-specific installation pieces using natural materials. His work is the subject of a retrospective at the National Museum of the American Indian, Water's Edge: The Art of Truman Lowe, on view in Washington, DC through January 2027.

== Background ==
=== Early life ===
Lowe was born on January 1, 1944, in Black River Falls, Wisconsin, on the Ho-Chunk Nation of Wisconsin reservation to Mabel Davis and Martin Lowe. The youngest of six children, Truman was thirteen years younger than his sister, Irene. Their mother Mabel worked a variety of positions as a cook at the local Mission School and as a laundress. When at home in Black River Falls, their father Martin was a farmer. He also traveled as a seasonal worker, picking blueberries and cranberries throughout the state. Surrounded often by close family, Lowe grew up speaking Ho-Chunk at home. As a child, he attended school at the Black River Indian Mission until grade 6. In 1957 he transferred to the public, non-Native school in Black River Falls proper.

Starting in 1960 Lowe worked during the summer at the Wisconsin Dells, "playing Indian" with other Native performers during an evening performance for tourists. Other summers he worked for the Dells Chamber of Commerce, dressing up in an "Indian costume" to greet tourists as they walked the streets. He also served as a tour guide on the Dells' excursion boats, again in "costume". Lowe's experience as a "stereotype" tour guide would later influence aspects of his work.

=== Higher education ===
Wah-Du-Sheh (Bundle) (1997) at the National Museum of the American Indian

Graduating from New Lisbon High School in the early 1960s, Lowe applied and was accepted by the University of Wisconsin–La Crosse. After switching majors, he settled on art education, and studied all aspects of fine art media. Midway through college, he left in 1964 to work in a factory assembly line.

In 1966 he married Nancy Knabe, whom he had met when working in the Dells. She was European-American, of German and Norwegian descent. The couple married at her family's church, Lyster Lutheran in Church Valley, Wisconsin. After their marriage, Nancy taught high school home economics while Lowe finished his undergraduate degree.

Upon graduation, the couple moved to Valders, Wisconsin. Lowe taught elementary and secondary art classes in the public schools and worked at his own art in his spare time. After teaching for two years, Lowe was accepted to the University of Wisconsin–Madison for a master's fine arts, after receiving a Ford Foundation fellowship. On October 2, 1971, their daughter Tonia Alison was born.

Lowe said about his reasons for returning to obtain his Masters: "I knew how to teach, but I wanted access to current information, and as much information as I could get my hands on, in order to be able to better help my students."

=== Teaching career and National Museum of the American Indian ===
After Lowe was awarded his master's degree in 1973, the couple moved to Emporia, Kansas. Lowe worked as a visiting art lecturer at Emporia State University. After two years, he returned to Madison, where he had been hired as assistant dean of Multicultural Programming at the University of Wisconsin. In 1975, Nancy gave birth to their second child, son Martin Howard (Kunu). That year, Lowe was given a joint appointment at the university in the Native American studies program, and as assistant professor of sculpture. He kept this until 1988.

While exhibiting and working on his art, Lowe became tenured at University of Wisconsin–Madison, where he was promoted to associate professor of art in 1984. After being promoted to full professor of art in 1989, Lowe was elected as chair of the art department, serving from 1992 to 1995.

In 2000 Lowe was appointed as the curator of contemporary art for the National Museum of the American Indian. Taking a leave of absence from the university, Lowe curated the inaugural exhibition of the new museum in Washington, DC, featuring artists George Morrison (Ojibwe) and Allan Houser (Chiricahua). He served as curator until 2008.

== Fine art career ==
=== Family and Ho-Chunk influence ===
As a child, Lowe would collect rocks along the Black River, scratching the river rocks together to create drawings by using the smaller rocks as pastels upon larger rocks. Eventually Lowe experimented with using rocks ground together as pigment, using substances such as motor oil and Vaseline to bind the color. Disappointed with this process, he explored nature by creating drawings of "how snow sits on trees." He was allowed to take his study hall in high school in the art room, where he continued to experiment.

While he was growing up, his parents created "craft" objects to supplement their family income. His mother made split-ash baskets and his father made the wooden handles for the baskets. Both parents created beadwork. The children gradually also learned the skills to create these family works. Lowe crafted beadwork by a kerosene lamp in the evening as a young man. These Lowe family crafts were produced to sell in the tourist trade. They delivered the items by station wagon to the Wisconsin Dells, providing an offset from the seasonal farming positions the family participated in. During the summer, when the family was involved in seasonal work, they sold their crafts from a portable roadside stand which they brought with them on their travels.

Like many other Native artists, Lowe had grown up with having created items within the household, as part of everyday practice. Until he attended university, he was not aware of the relatively recent Western idea of a person making a living full-time by art. There he fully delved into the concepts and creations within Western art history. He recognized the more recent social prestige related to the artist and artistic creation. His parents, as craftspeople, would have been ranked lower in status.

Lowe's first artist interest was Michelangelo, of whom he said:

"Although my parents made a partial living weaving baskets, the two concepts of 'profession' and 'art' never came together in my mind until... college... [Then] I read everything I could get my hands on about Michelangelo....He was the first artist I'd met through my studies who went to work everyday and was paid by his patrons [and] employers for making art. Obviously, I learned encyclopedias from the work, but the practical lesson was that art could be a profession as well as a passion."

=== Early works during college ===
Lowe's early work was inspired heavily by the education he was receiving. Paintings showing exercises in abstraction and geometric patterns in the style of Frank Stella are seen in paintings like Suzy (1968) and color theory works such as Yellow Over Green and Yellow Over Red (1969), the latter two which have since been destroyed. Working in clay, Lowe created egg-shaped sculptures that sat on coiled stands, Collection of Eggs and Unmatched Halves (c. 1968), giving a fantasy yet comic feel to his early experiments in art.

Sculpture classes taught him about the power of the line in artworks and its placement in nature. Lowe studied the works of Brâncuși, where he familiarized himself with geometry in sculpture, and Henry Moore's works regarding scale in sculpture. And with the popularity of plastic in the 1960s Lowe expanded his mediums to complete 3-D works including a life-size toaster of sheet plastic made from a sandwich sealer, complete with pieces of toast in the slot, recalling the soft sculpture works of Claes Oldenburg at the time. His first undergraduate installation Laundry Bags (1969), showing a pile of clear plastic trash bags filled with colored rags piled in the corner of an exhibition space. This large-scale installation work would be a hallmark for Lowe's work in the future and throughout his career.

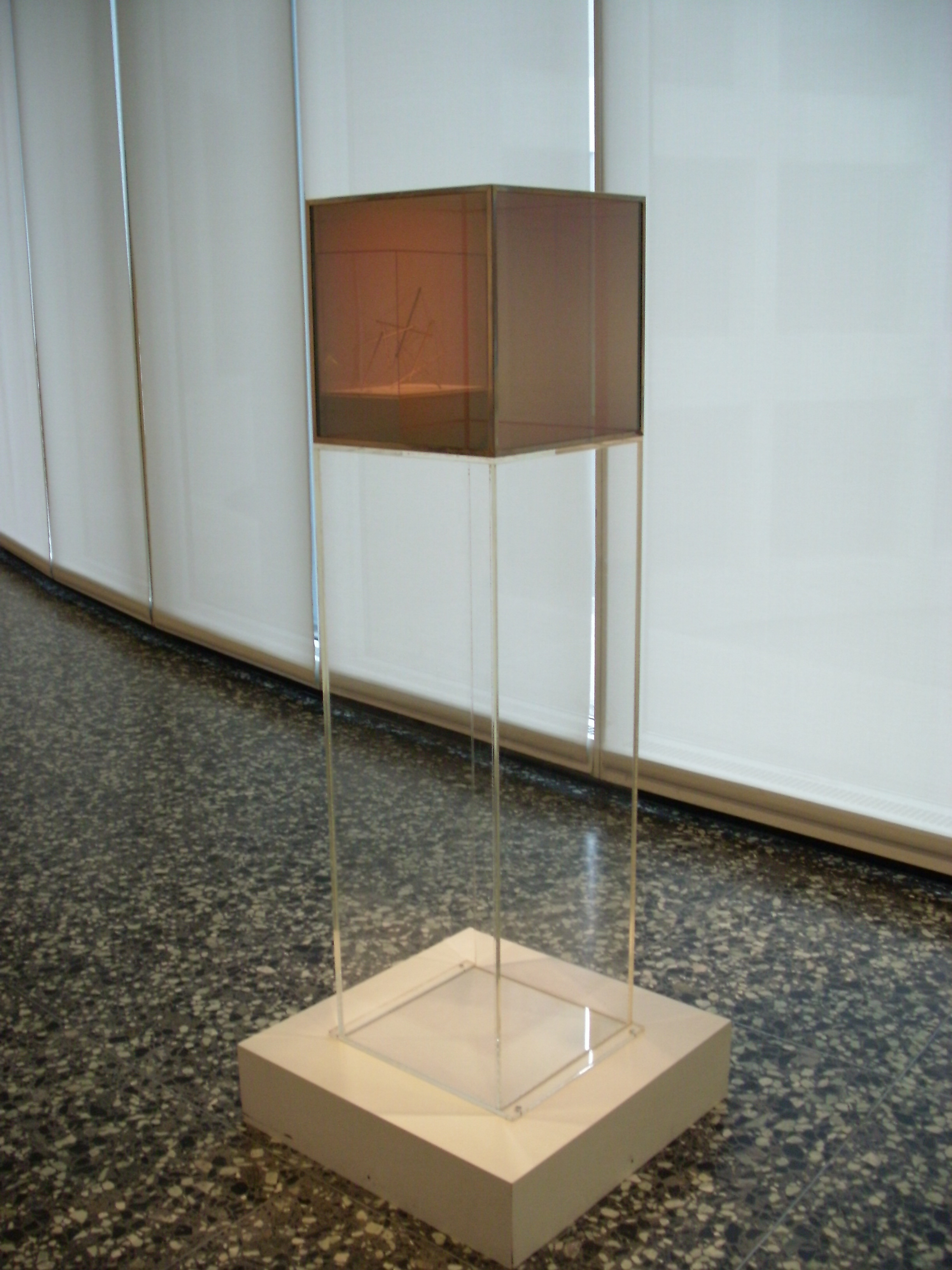
Untitled, 1964, by Larry Bell

His M.F.A. exhibition in spring of 1973 showcased these experimental installations. Long plastic sheets cut into fringe, draped around or sandwiched between sheets of Plexiglas that hung from the ceiling with raw fluorescent light behind the plastic. Influenced by Larry Bell's work to create a space where the work was indistinguishable from its surroundings, Lowe states about the exhibition:

I arranged the pieces haphazardly in that space. I wanted to create an environment where one just moved from piece to piece without having the chance to stand back and think about the piece as a real object. I wanted to eliminate all that.

Upon meeting George Morrison, Lowe found a role model. Morrison's Midwestern heritage and ability to blend in and out of Native and non-Native art communities provided a unique opportunity to explore involvement and separate from and within Native art worlds.

=== Red Power ===
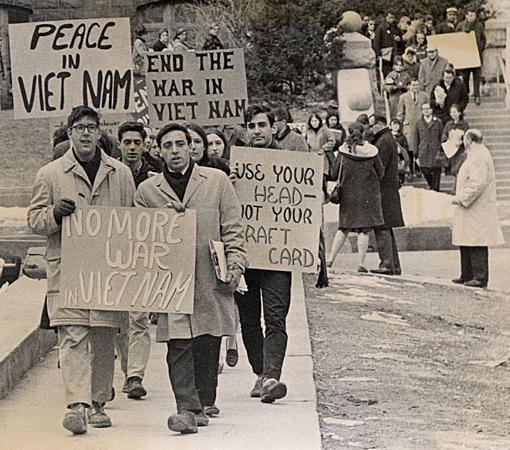
Students protesting the Vietnam war at University of Wisconsin-Madison in 1965.

During his return to obtain his master's degree, the University of Wisconsin-Madison was a hotbed of activism regarding the Vietnam War, while in Indian Country the Red Power movement was taking shape. Aware of the energy brewing in Native America, Lowe focused on school:

I didn't have the luxury – and I consider it a luxury – of being a protester because my focus was concentrated on getting information. I knew I wasn't going to be in that position for very long. I wanted to participate in gathering whatever information I could in the time I had, and I wanted to bring it all together, really to see what would happen. I needed time to work by myself.

Despite lack of time to focus on protesting and involvement in political movements, Lowe made a six-hour trip to hear Native activist and writer Vine Deloria, Jr. speak. Speaking about the need for Native peoples to take advantage of educational and economic opportunities to widen Native opportunities, Lowe chose to make that his mantra for his life choices and career.

=== Time in Kansas ===
Moving to Kansas in 1973 for a teaching position, the Lowe family lived on a farm. During this time Lowe realized "[he] was really a Woodland Indian," owing to the lack of diversity in the landscape – he missed Wisconsin. However, Lowe's time in Kansas would not be without its benefits. He began to experiment with wood, and found natural objects. Creating assemblage pieces, abandoning synthetic materials completely. Living away from Wisconsin allowed Lowe to become aware of his heritage and environment, allowing him to re-embrace the nature of the Upper Midwestern environment and bring his own unique contemporary spin on skills learned within his family – woodworking and basketry.

This move towards natural materials coincided with the popularity of the back-to-the-land movement. Lowe discovered the Foxfire books as popular culture discovered the concept of the "ecological Indian".

=== Return to Wisconsin ===
Upon returning to Wisconsin and joining faculty at the university, Lowe's work began to become embraced by viewers and critics as contemporary Indian art. Through interviews Lowe connected each work to unique techniques and traditions of Native concepts of craft and fine art. His work in the late 1970s embraced his own "analysis of traditional Indian techniques," depicting war shields heavily decorated with feathers and often simple in their look. Celebrating the Native symbolism behind the feather as a rewarding, powerful object seen within many communities, it became an important part of his works and installations.

=== Storytelling works ===
Like many contemporary Native American artists, Lowe chooses his medium to explore the stories and experiences of Native peoples, allowing his artwork to serve as a form of cultural survival. The cosmology of the Ho-Chunk people is told through a massive wooden sculpture Red Banks (1991), consisting entirely of wood at 12 × 37 × 8 feet. Red Banks serves as a visual analogy for oral tradition and myth, as well showing the framework upon which survival rests.

At the premier of Red Banks Lowe embraced the importance of the artist as a storyteller and archivist of culture:

Since Ho-Chunk history is largely oral, tribal artists have a particularly important role to play in preserving tradition as well as making non-Indians aware of Ho-Chunk culture.

Other stories told through Lowe's work include the smallpox epidemic on the Black River Falls Indian Mission in 1901 (Wooden Pole Construction, 1983), serving as what has been described a "contemporary version of the mnemonic device," an idea that flows throughout his entire catalog of work. Personal stories are also reflected on through works like Feather Tree (1990), which honors his grandmother and the land she lived in. Lowe's work has also flowed into two dimensional drawings, where he has chosen to honor his mother's legacy.

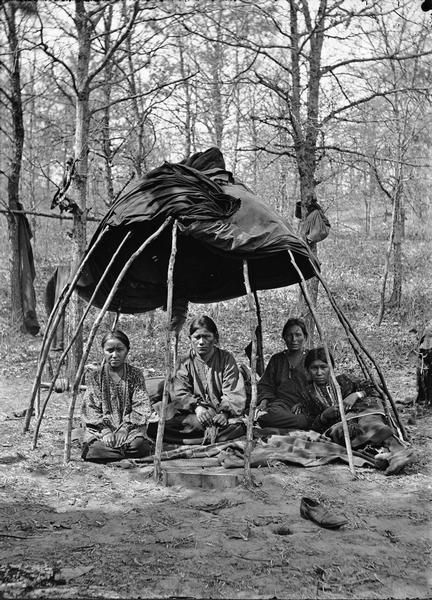
Four Winnebago women under a structure commonly seen as an influence in Lowe's work, from the Wisconsin Historical Society

=== Preserving historical Native aspects ===
Many of Lowe's works also embrace historically traditional works of Native peoples from Ho-Chunk, Woodland, and other Native American groups. The Headdress Series formed out of his interest in traditional Plains Indian regalia and a collection of pedestal and large scale sculptures incorporated the architecture of early shelters from the Woodlands communities. Many of his works have also incorporated other traditional Native objects frequently found within museum collections such as the work Cradle Board (1977–78) where Lowe used photographs found in the Wisconsin State Historical Society collections to serve as inspirations and putting his own twist on the concept of a cradle board. Many of the images from the historical society served as inspiration and research for his work, especially with housing and general community living in Ho-Chunk communities and beyond.

Primitive housing and structures served as a way for Lowe to reflect on the disappearance of cultures in time, memory and history by way of an aesthetic. Their naked and simple—yet complexly built—designs reflect a "ghost like" presence of the past. In 1986 Lowe reflected on his sculpture work: "My real interest is structures, the sculptural aspect of primitive structures...what intrigues me is that something is very primitive yet at the same time, very universal."

Small and large installations began to emerge in Lowe's work depicting higher conceptions influenced by his son's interest in astronomy. Works such as the Solstice series and Skychart series depict abstract astrological charts and images inspired by the exploration of peoples to new areas and regions with guidance from the sky.

== Major works and symbols ==
=== Red Ochre Series ===
In 1991 Lowe launched the first of site-specific installations in a series called Red Ochre. The first of the series, shown in Atlanta, Georgia, explored anthropological theories about human migration and early North American settlement. It was inspired by ancient burial sites and death rites. His work reveals ideas of blending cultures, rituals, and migration through time.

In 1993 the second installation was placed at the Eiteljorg Museum of American Indians and Western Art in Indianapolis, Indiana. Lowe's work incorporated images of rock art, examining how cultures' migration paths crossed by way of unifying natural artistic venues. He suggested that rock art served as communication devices for cultures worldwide. In this work, Lowe invited the public to assist in the construction of the work, to ensure the relevance of the piece.

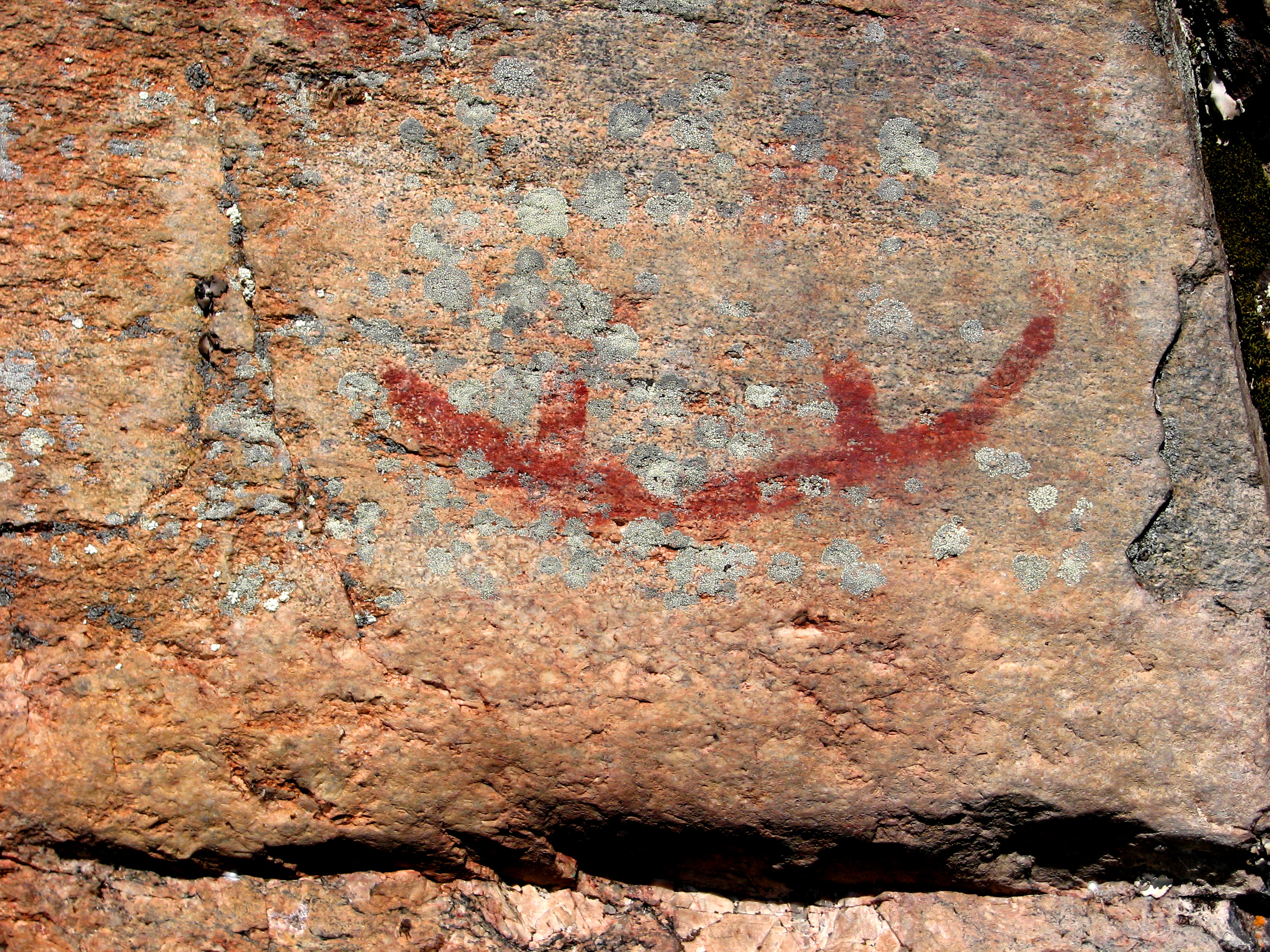
Rock art of a canoe – two themes seen within Lowe's artwork, from Quetico Provincial Park, Ontario, Canada

Both expansive installations include the use of natural materials such as saplings, as well as brown paper, providing a rock-like or textured look to selected mediums. Each piece was dramatically different, with the Eiteljorg work focusing strongly on murals and wall constructs, and the Atlanta work focusing on an exploratory forest-like environment.

=== Canoes ===
If I have a religion, it must be canoeing...I canoe wherever there's water. It puts me in a totally different state of mind and provides all I need to exist. – Truman Lowe

A classic symbol of Native America, the canoe has become a notable object scene throughout Lowe's work. A canoeist by recreation, Lowe attempts to reach beyond stereotypes and classic imagery by using the iconic canoe in his work. He also embraces his fascination with primitive structures, seeing the canoe both as a shelter and as a vehicle. Many of the canoes appear like wigwams; constructed wooden skeletons of various shapes and sizes, with curved aspects. The canoe is also represented mnemonically in selected works by way of highly constructed small sculptures.

=== Water ===
Water Whispers, 2005, in the collection of the Eiteljorg Museum

Lowe uses images and suggestions of water in many of his works, including the canoes. Again, Lowe works in large-scale installations and smaller sculptures. In the Water Spirits, series, Lowe says that "the Water Spirits pieces are really an effort to show some respect for natural forces as well as what we would call spiritual forces." He combines selected wood pieces and debris to reflect seasonal changes, the fragility of these natural environments, and the importance of the flow of water.

In 1992 Lowe was commissioned by the Minnesota Arts Commission for a sculpture at Cloquet Community College. The sculpture sits within a large grouping of pine trees. Made of polished stainless steel, it hovers a foot and a half above the ground, intertwining through the trees like a stream. It may be used as a bench: he cut thin slits into the steel to reveal large rocks from nearby riverbeds. As they are glimpsed through the steel, the flowing of water is represented.

Other notable works of the series include Ottawa (1992), which represents the steep slopes where water rapidly flows amongst the three rivers near the National Gallery of Canada in Ottawa, Canada. Rows of unfinished strips of line "flow" in gradation representing a fast moving stream or roller coaster. An open structure that reflects the relationship between the river and its surroundings, it has been described as a high modernist work. Shorelines and streambeds are also found in his sculptures. Water Mound (1994), a massive installation of wood, represents the sandbars that form during seasonal and other changes in river systems. The river's edge is shown in other large installations, such as Maumee Reflection (1987), depicting Lowe's vision of when land meets water at the confluence of three rivers near Fort Wayne, Indiana, where the work was displayed.

Shorelines and streambeds are also found in his sculptures. Water Mound (1994), a massive installation of wood, represents the sandbars that form during seasonal and other changes in river systems. The river's edge is shown in other large installations, such as Maumee Reflection (1987), depicting Lowe's vision of when land meets water at the confluence of three rivers near Fort Wayne, Indiana, where the work was displayed.

Many of the water-related works also depict aspects of basketry, with splints of wood, which are usually used to form the shape of the basket. Again, Lowe shows another connection to his family and community creations, inspired by his mother's basketry work.

=== Grids ===
In the tradition of modernism, Lowe uses the grid in selected works. Reflective of works by Sol LeWitt and Eva Hesse, he uses grids as representations of mapping systems—a way to describe environments and landscapes in a two-dimensional way. Native American communities were not traditionally map makers, unlike Europeans at the time of their colonization. They conducted major land-surveying programs as a means of marking and measuring these new lands. An important part of the Manifest Destiny ideal, governments made use of the grid in new territories to divide and systematically distribute purportedly equal land to colonists and settlers. Lowe also uses the grid as symbolic of archeological digs. They appear in major landscape works by Lowe such as Effigy I (1984).

=== Wood ===
Many of Lowe's constructions are created from willow saplings, often the only material used in installations. Lowe collects the saplings from Wisconsin farms in the summertime, gathering a large amount, peeling off the bark, and sanding the resulting sticks to bring out the white in the sapling. Flexibility and strength are essential with willow, allowing Lowe to bend and manipulate the wood to his needs.

== Public collections ==
- Boston Museum of Fine Art, Boston, MA
- Chazen Museum of Art, Madison, WI
- Crow's Shadow Institute of the Arts, Pendleton, OR
- Des Moines Art Center, Des Moines, IA
- Denver Art Museum, Denver, CO
- Eiteljorg Museum of American Indians and Western Art, Indianapolis, IN
- Fond du Lac Tribal and Community College, Cloquet, MN
- Fort Lewis College, Durango, CO
- Fort Wayne Museum of Art, Fort Wayne, IN
- Heard Museum, Phoenix, AZ
- Hood Museum of Art, Hanover, N.H.
- Indianapolis Art Center, Indianapolis, IN
- Kellog School of Management, Northwestern University, Evanston, IL
- Madison Museum of Contemporary Art, Madison, WI
- McCormick Place Convention Center, Chicago, IL
- Metropolitan Museum of Art, New York, NY
- Milwaukee Art Museum, Milwaukee, WI
- Minneapolis Institute of Art, Minneapolis, MN
- Montclair Art Museum, Montclair, NJ
- Museum of Contemporary Art, Chicago, IL
- Museum of Contemporary Native Arts, Santa Fe, N.M.
- Museum of Wisconsin Art, West Bend, WI
- National Cowboy and Western Heritage Museum, Oklahoma City, OK
- National Museum of the American Indian, Washington, DC
- Nature at the Confluence, South Beloit, IL
- Peabody Essex Museum, Salem, MA
- Plains Art Museum, Fargo, ND
- Portland Art Museum, Portland, OR
- Rockwell Museum, Corning, NY
- Smith College Museum of Art, Northampton, MA
- Smithsonian American Museum of Art, Washington, DC
- Stanley Museum of Art, University of Iowa, Iowa City, IA
- St. Louis Art Museum, St. Louis, MO
- Tucson Museum of Art, Tucson, AZ
- Tweed Museum of Art, University of Minnesota - Duluth, MN
- Whitney Museum of American Art - New York, NY

== Major exhibitions ==
- [Posthumous] Water's Edge: The Art of Truman Lowe, 2025-2026, National Museum of the American Indian, Washington, DC
- [Posthumous] Native Prospects: Indigeneity and Landscape, Thomas Cole National Historic Site, Catskill, NY
- [Posthumous] Water Memories, Metropolitan Museum of Art, New York, NY
- [Posthumous] Changing Currents: The Art of Truman Lowe, 2020, Art Gallery, University of Wisconsin - La Crosse, WI
- Cultural Confluence: Work by Truman Lowe, 2017, Plains Art Museum, Fargo, ND
- Truman Lowe: Limn, 2010, Museum of Wisconsin Art, Bend, WI
- Vantage Point, 2010, National Museum of the American Indian, Washington, DC
- Remembrance, 2001, Madison Museum of Contemporary Art, Madison, WI
- Nigachiwong: Swirling Waters, 2001, Tweed Museum of Art, University of Minnesota - Duluth, MN
- Between the Lakes: Artists Respond to Madison, 2006, Madison Museum of Contemporary Art
- Neo-Xahnee, 1999–2000, John Michael Kohler Arts Center, Sheboygan, WI
- Honoring Native America, 1998, White House, Washington, DC
- Powerful Images: Portrayals of Native America, 1998, National Cowboy & Western Heritage Museum
- From the Shadows of the River, 1996, Clara M. Eagle Art Gallery, Murray State University, Murray, KY
- Haga (Third son), 1994, Eiteljorg Museum of American Indians and Western Art, Indianapolis, IN
- 8 Native American Artists, 1988, Fort Wayne Museum of Art, Fort Wayne, IN

== Selected Awards, Grants and Honors ==
- [Posthumous] Lifetime Achievement Award, 2019, Native American Art Studies Association
- Distinguished Alumni Award, 2008, Wisconsin Alumni Association, University of Wisconsin
- Wisconsin Visual Art Lifetime Achievement Award, 2007, Wisconsin Arts Board
- Wisconsin Academy of Sciences, Arts and Letters, 2005
- Eiteljorg Fellowship, 1999, Eiteljorg Museum of American Indians and Western Art
- Outstanding Alumni Award, 1999, University of Wisconsin - La Crosse
- WARF Mid-Career Faculty Research Award, 1997, University of Wisconsin - Madison
- National Endowment for the Arts Individual Fellowship, 1994–1995, National Endowment for the Arts
- Chancellor's Development Grant, 1991–1992, University of Wisconsin - Madison
- Wisconsin Arts Board Project Grant, 1989
- Honorary Fellow, 1987, Phi Kappa Phi Honor Society
- Chancellor's Development Award in the Creative Arts, 1985–1990, University of Wisconsin - Madison
- Named "Outstanding Citizen" by Madison Civics Club, 1985
- Governor's Heritage Award, 1984, State of Wisconsin
- Ford Foundation Doctoral Fellowship, 1971–1973, Ford Foundation
