= Statue of Abraham Lincoln (Indianapolis) =

Outdoor sculpture in the U.S. state of Illinois

- Artist: Henry Hering
- Subject: Abraham Lincoln
- Location: Indianapolis, Indiana, United States; 39°46′17.4″N 86°9′23.1″W

A statue of Abraham Lincoln by Henry Hering, sometimes called Abraham Lincoln or Seated Lincoln, is installed in Indianapolis, Indiana, United States, in University Park.

== History ==
The 1934 sculpture was dedicated on April 6, 1935. It was surveyed by the Smithsonian Institution's "Save Outdoor Sculpture!" program in 1993.

== See also ==
- List of public art in Indianapolis
- List of statues of Abraham Lincoln
