= Statue of Benjamin Harrison =

Sculpture by Charles Henry Niehaus

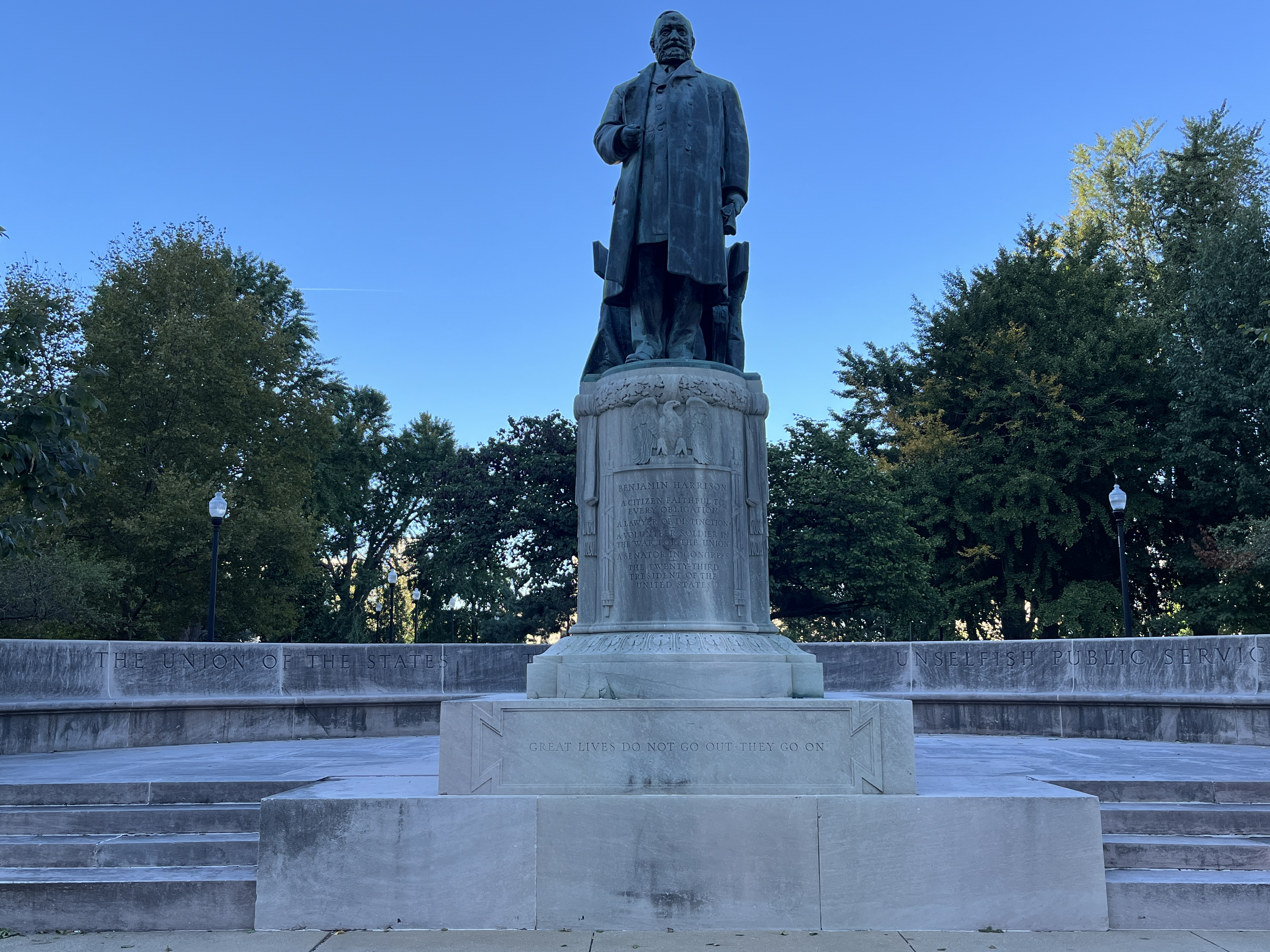
- The statue in 2024
- Artist: Charles Henry Niehaus
- Year: 1908
- Type: bronze
- Dimensions: 1.3 m × 0.47 m × 0.55 m (4.2 ft × 1.54 ft × 1.8 ft)
- Location: Indianapolis, Indiana, U.S.; 39°46′17″N 86°9′25″W

Benjamin Harrison is a public artwork by American artist Charles Henry Niehaus, located in University Park in downtown Indianapolis, Indiana, United States. It is a full-length bronze sculptural portrait of Benjamin Harrison, the 23rd president of the United States, the only U.S. president from Indiana.

== Description ==
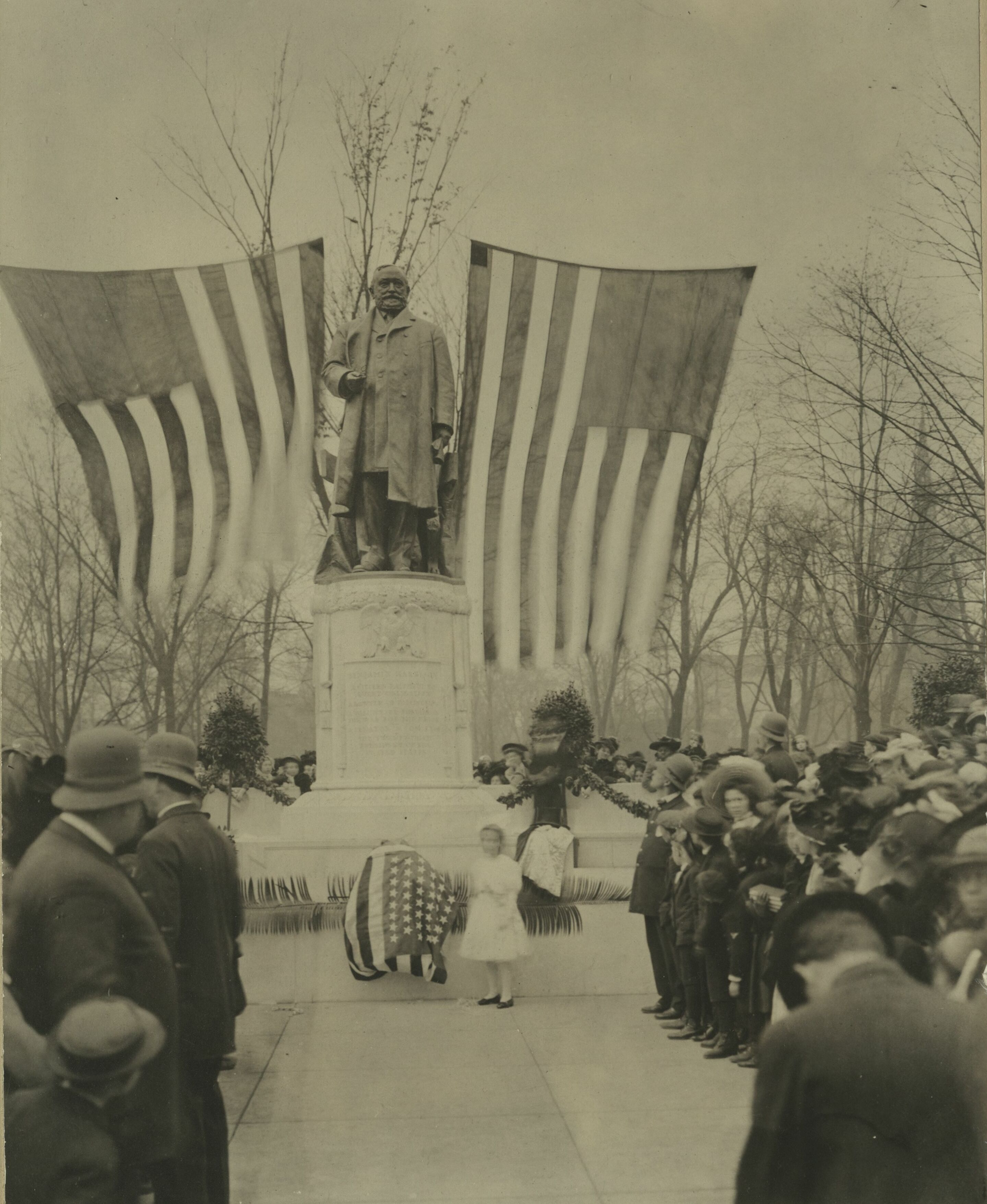
Benjamin Harrison's monument in University Park during its unveiling in 1908 by his young daughter, Elizabeth Harrison

The sculpture was designed by Henry Bacon, sculpted by Charles Henry Niehaus, and cast by Gorham Manufacturing Company. The statue was dedicated October 27, 1908. The statue was partially funded by a benefit held at the English Opera House in 1902.

The sculpture depicts Benjamin Harrison standing before a draped, Greek style chair. He wears an open overcoat with one hand upraised and one hand holding gloves. Niehaus found that a lifelike depiction of the president, seated, would not be flattering. "As Harrison was below the average stature in height he was unable to touch the floor when seated, which made this attitude practically impossible from an artistic standpoint." The sculpture is mounted on an oval limestone base with a decorative top border and a relief of an eagle on the front.

== Location ==
University Park is part of the Indiana World War Memorial Plaza in downtown Indianapolis. During his presidential campaign, Harrison often gave speeches to traveling delegations in University Park.

== See also ==
- List of sculptures of presidents of the United States
