= Pro Patria (sculpture) =

1929 statue by Henry Hering in Indianapolis, Indiana, U.S.

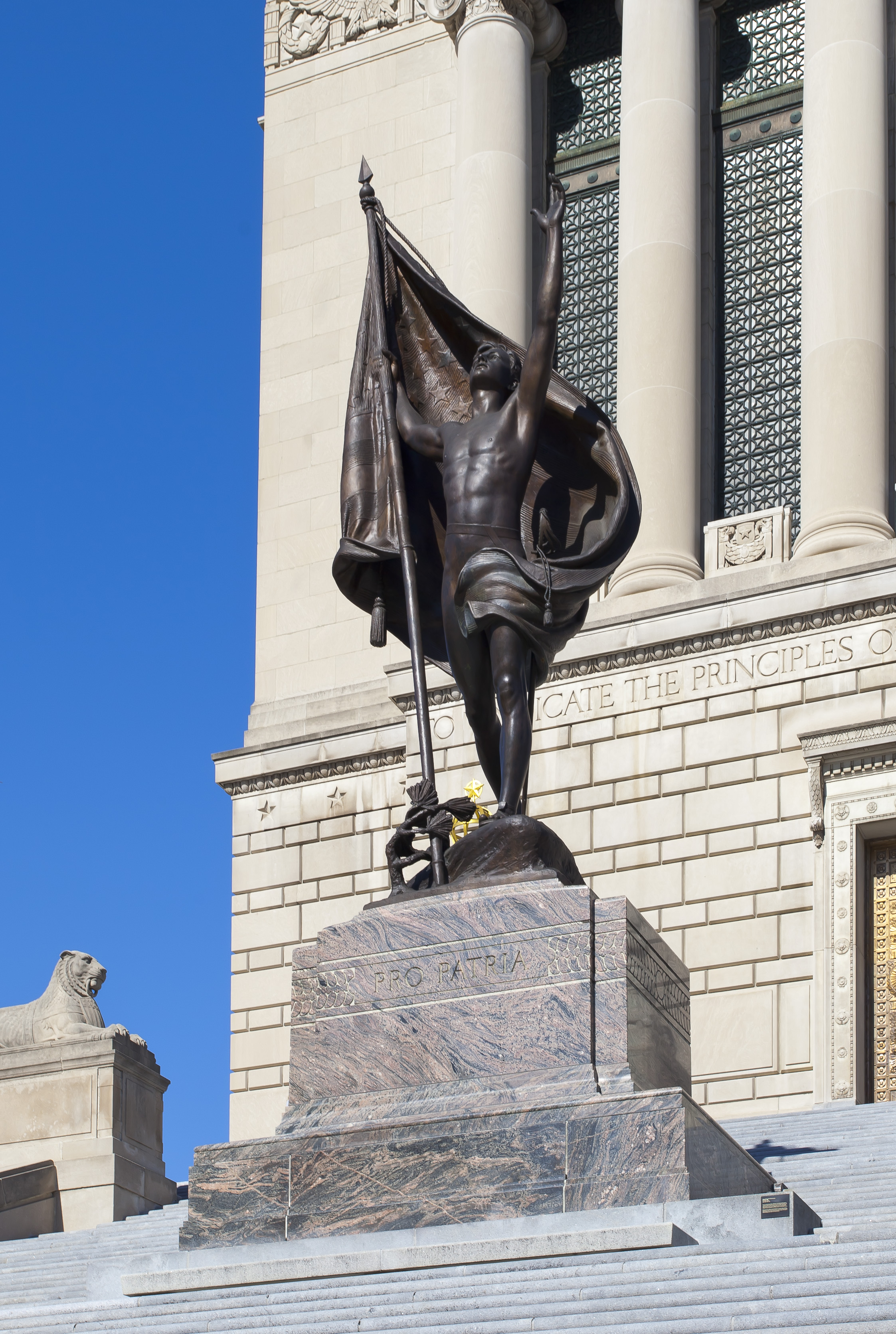
- The statue in 2012
- Medium: Bronze sculpture
- Location: Indianapolis, Indiana, U.S.
- 39.7730°N 86.1569°W

Pro Patria is a 1929 bronze sculpture by American artist Henry Hering, installed in Indianapolis, Indiana. It is among the nation's largest sculptural bronze castings. In Latin, pro patria means "for the fatherland."

== History ==
Pro Patria was installed during a change in the architectural landscape of Indianapolis during the interwar period between World War 1 and World War 2. Part of this transformation included Pro Patria. In 1919, municipal leaders sought to establish Indianapolis as a center for veterans affairs by securing a permanent home for the American Legion. In 1920, led by Governor James P. Goodrich, the Indiana General Assembly passed the Indiana War Memorial Bill, which appropriated the modern equivalent of $28.5 million for this project. The plaza cornerstone, laid by former General John J. Pershing, was laid in 1927, with the statute arriving in Indianapolis and installed in October 1929. The sculpture was cast in seven places, and was necessary due to the immense volume of the figure and limitations of the foundry crucibles at the time. Final production was completed at the Roman Bronze Works in Corona, New York.

== Symbolism ==
Henry Hering stated of the statue "I have attempted to embody in this memorial, the spirit rather than material concept of a soldier-- to give the figure an expression of all there is in humanity of aspiration, valor, renunciation and the perpetuation of the memory of the patriot fighting for the right. I include peace also, for the left hand raised in exultation also may snatch the olive branch." The motifs in the painting represent the human drive to strive for a higher purpose beyond the self. The young man depicted in this picture is cloaked in the American flag, suggesting his identity has been transformed. However, the statue is not a warlike figure, but rather a "exultant" young man, having completed his duty, his free hand is now ready to reach for an olive branch, a common symbol of peace.

== Description ==
The bronze sculpture Pro Patria is installed on the south side of the Indiana War Memorial, in Indianapolis. The statue weighs approximately seven tons and has a pink granite base. It depicts an "exultant" young man draped in an American flag.

== See also ==
- List of public art in Indianapolis
