= Léon Hermant =

American sculptor (1866–1936)

Polar Bear Expedition Monument in White Chapel Cemetery, Troy, Michigan

Leon Hermant (1866–1936) was an American sculptor best known for his architectural sculpture.

Hermant was born in France, educated in Europe and came to America in 1904 to work on the French Pavilion at the Louisiana Purchase Exposition in St. Louis, Missouri. For most of his career he was based in Chicago, working mostly in the American midwest, and frequently with a partner Carl Beil.

In 1928 Hermant was awarded the Légion d'honneur by the French government for his Louis Pasteur Monument in Grant Park, Chicago.

== Public monuments ==
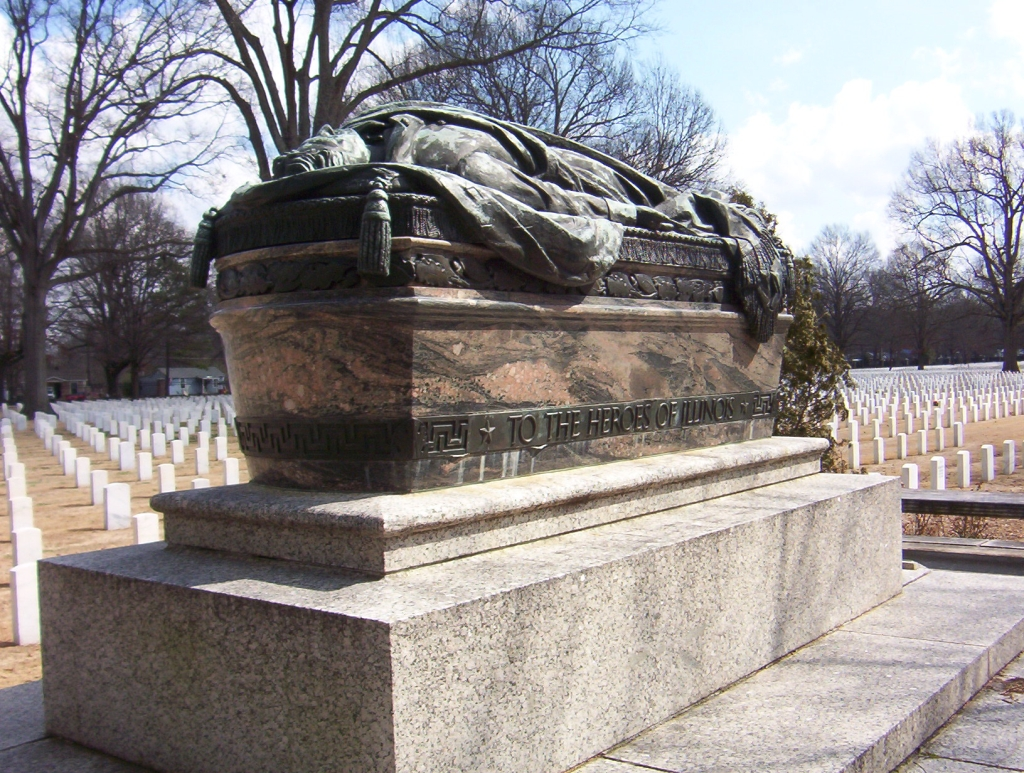
Heroes of Illinois Memorial in the Memphis National Cemetery (2008)

- Confederate Monument (1908) Parkersburg, West Virginia
- William Shakespeare, (1915) Northwestern University, Evanston, Illinois
- Louis Pasteur Memorial, (1928) Grant Park, Chicago
- Heroes of Illinois Memorial (1928) Memphis National Cemetery, Memphis, Tennessee
- Governor Edward Coles Memorial, (1929) Valley View Cemetery, Edwardsville, Illinois
- George Rogers Clark, (1932), Fort Massac, Metropolis, Illinois
- Polar Bear Memorial (1930) White Chapel Cemetery, Troy, Michigan
- General John A. Logan Monument, Murphysboro, Illinois
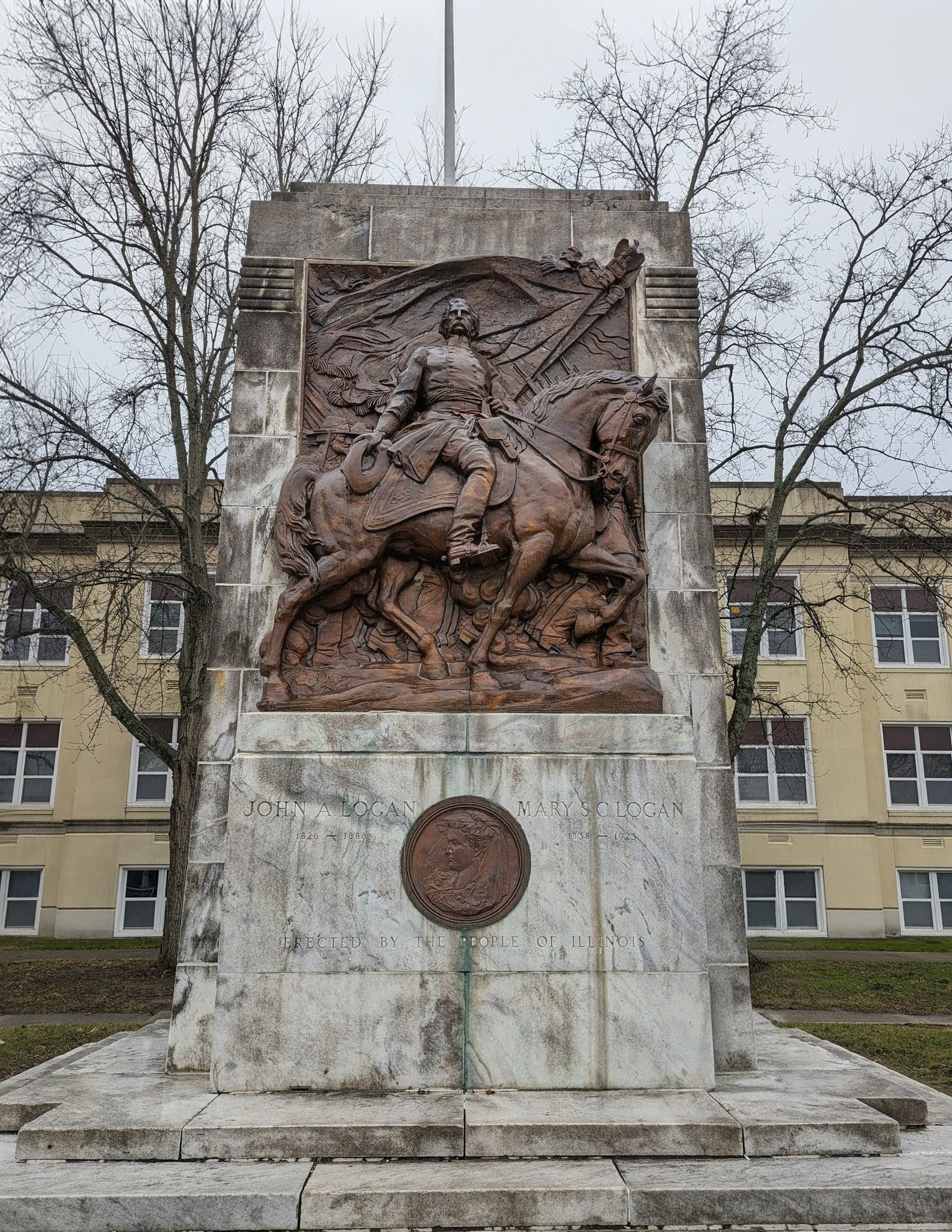
  Gen. John A. Logan Statue at Murphysboro Middle School

== Architectural sculpture ==
- Cathedral of St. Paul (1905), St. Paul, Minnesota, Emmanuel Louis Masqueray architect
- Illinois Athletic Club Building, (1908), Chicago
- Cook County Building, (1911), Chicago
- University High School, (1918), Urbana, Illinois Holabird & Roche architects
- Benjamin Franklin Bridge, (1926) Philadelphia, Paul Cret, architect
- Detroit Institute of Art (1927), Paul Cret et al. architect, Detroit
- Radisson Chicago Hotel Reliefs, (1929), Chicago
- One N La Salle Street (1930), Vitzthum & Burns architects, Chicago
- carvings at the Indiana State Library and Historical Building, (1934) Indianapolis
- Four Modes of Travel, Calvert Street Bridge, now Duke Ellington Bridge, (1935) Washington D.C.
- United States Customs Building, (1936) Washington, D.C. WPA
- United States Interstate Commerce Commission Building, (1936) Washington D.C.
