= Syrinx (Wolter) =

Artwork by German-born American sculptor Adolph Wolter

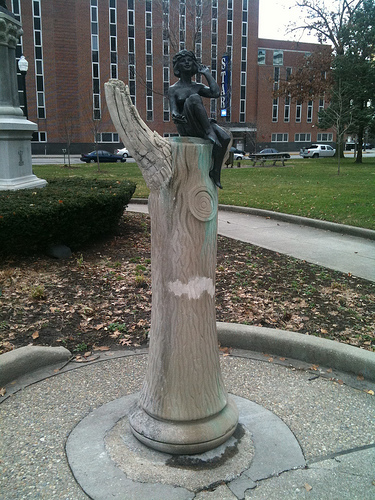
- Artist: Adolph Wolter
- Year: 1973
- Type: Bronze
- Dimensions: 69 cm × 41 cm × 33 cm (27 in × 16 in × 13 in)
- Location: Indianapolis, Indiana, United States; 39°46′19″N 86°9′24″W
- Owner: City of Indianapolis

Syrinx is a 1973 public artwork by German-born American sculptor Adolph Wolter located at the Indiana World War Memorial Plaza in Indianapolis, Indiana, United States.

== Description ==
It is a bronze figure of Syrinx sitting on a limestone tree stump. Syrinx is nude, and her proper right knee is bent upwards to her chest with her other leg hanging over the side of the stump. She holds her hand to her ear, cupping it, "listening" to the music of the nearby sculpture of the satyr Pan, who plays a flute.

== Information ==
In 1923 Myra Reynolds Richards created Syrinx and Pan for installation at University Park at the Indiana World War Memorial Plaza. Eventually, both pieces were stolen, with Syrinx disappearing in 1959 and Pan being stolen in 1970. The parks department commissioned Adolph Wolter to replace the pieces, and in 1973 they were reinstalled in their current location in University Park at the Plaza.
