= Indiana State Library and Historical Bureau =

Library and historic building in Indianapolis, Indiana, US

- Indiana State Library and Historical Building
- U.S. National Register of Historic Places
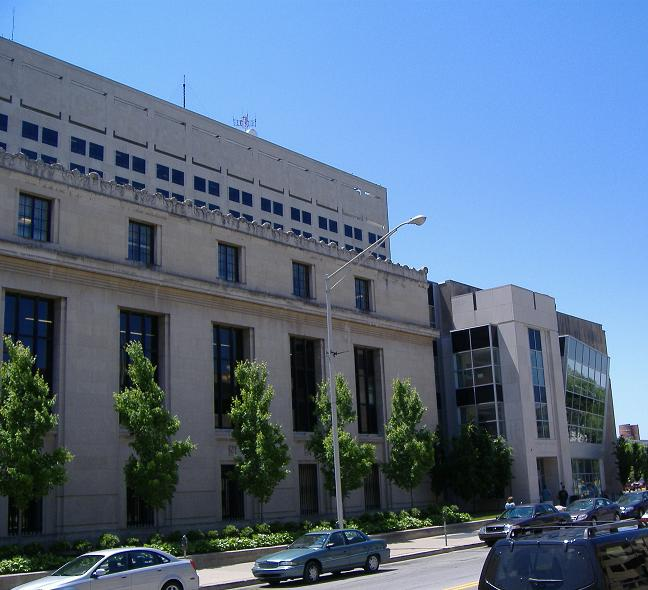

- Location within Indiana Location within the United States
- Location: Indianapolis, Indiana, U.S.
- Coordinates: 39°46′10.55″N 86°9′49.66″W
- Built: 1934
- Architects: Pierre, Edward Dienhart Joseph; Wright, George Caleb
- Architectural style: Classical Revival, Art Deco
- Website: www.in.gov/library/
- NRHP reference No.: 95000207
- Added to NRHP: March 3, 1995

The Indiana State Library and Historical Bureau is a public library building, located in Indianapolis, Indiana, United States. It is the largest public library in the state of Indiana, housing over 60,000 manuscripts. Established in 1934, the library has gathered a large collection of books on a vast variety of topics.

== History ==
The Indiana State Library and Historical Bureau has been open to the public since 1934.

The first attempts to have a state library started when Indiana was still a territory with its capital in Corydon, making it the oldest agency of the Indiana government. However, the first actual Indiana state library would not be opened until the capital had moved to Indianapolis, starting on February 11, 1825, with the secretary of state acting as librarian. In 1867, the library's law books were transferred to the Supreme Court to begin the Supreme Court Law Library, which has grown to 70,000 volumes. The library became its own institution in 1841. The State Board of Education gained control of the library in 1895, with the Department of Education gaining control in 1933. Between 1895 and 1933, the library amassed more material than it had in all its previous existence. Originally, the library was only for the use of state employees and government officials. After assigning a two-cent tax to attain funds in 1929, and having architects send proposals for a new building in 1931, it was built to designs by Pierre & Wright Architects.

In 1945 the library was directed by Howard Henry Peckham, an early American historian who was the first to publish the Revolutionary War journals of Henry Dearborn, a revolutionary war officer and Secretary of War under President Thomas Jefferson. (Note: Peckham is also widely noted for discovering that American revolutionary war deaths were much higher than previously assumed.)

The building is made of Indiana limestone, sandstone, and walnut. Interior features include brass accents, fanciful murals, walnut-paneled walls, stained glass windows, and woodcarvings. The external architectural sculpture was created by Leon Hermant and carved by Adolph Wolter.

The library has seven main divisions: Talking Book and Braille Library, Genealogy, Indiana Collection, Rare Books and Manuscripts, Reference and Government Services, Professional Development, and Library Development.

A 1993 inventory of the library's holdings included 60,000 books and pamphlets, 3,500 collected manuscripts, 1.5 million images, and 1,000 maps. Some of this included not only the history of Indiana, but that of the Old Northwest as well.

It has been on the National Register of Historic Places since 1995.

The Indiana Historical Bureau has a home at the library. Founded in 1915 as the Indiana Historical Commission, its initial purpose was to prepare for the centennial of Indiana's statehood. The bureau largely concentrates on the placement of new historical markers across Indiana and encourages education in Indiana history. The bureau runs a gift shop at the library.

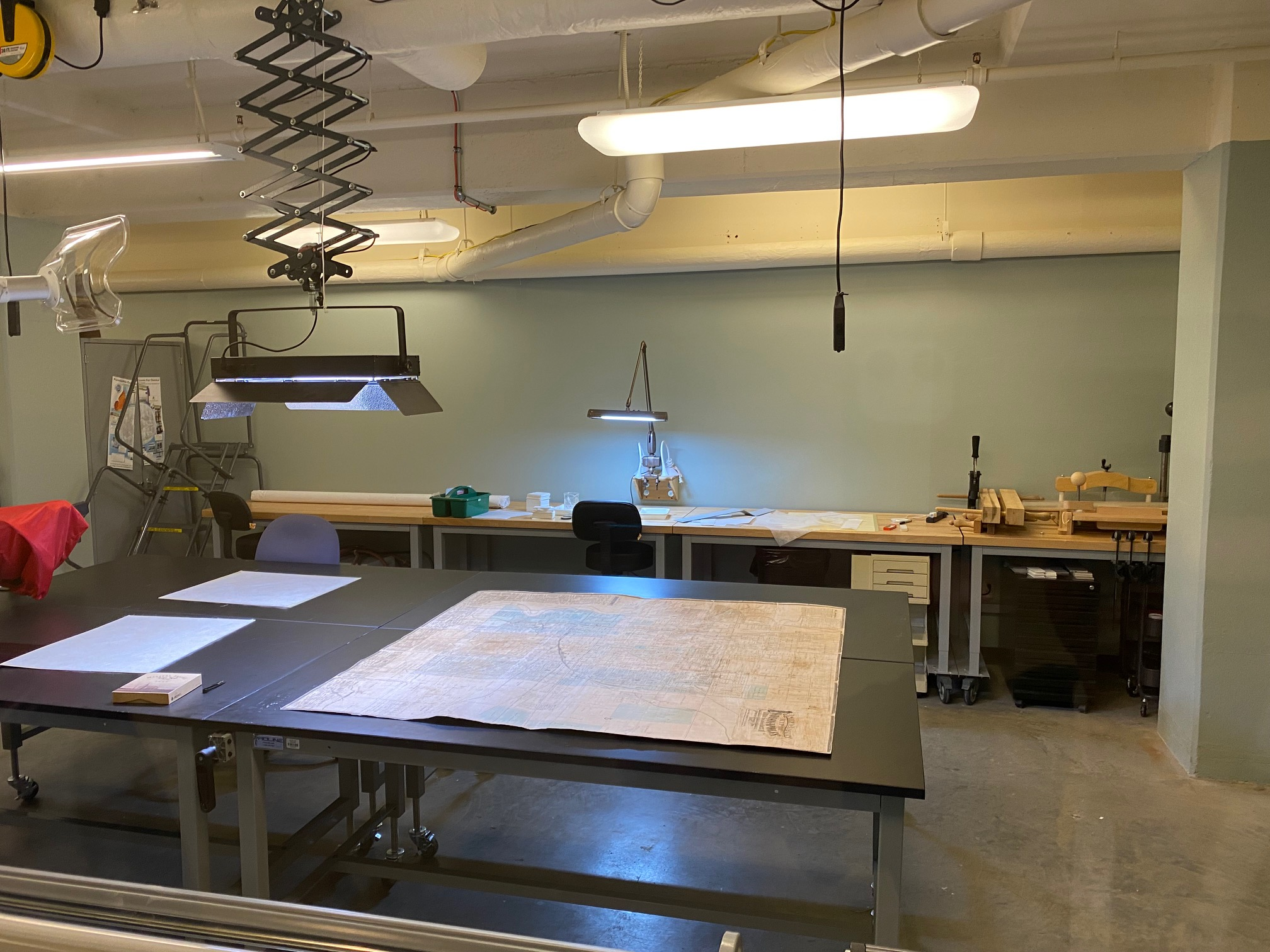
Martha E. Wright Conservation Lab

The library's Martha E. Wright Conservation Lab has specialized equipment devoted to conservation and restoration of historic documents.

== See also ==
- List of Indiana state historical markers
- List of libraries in the United States
- List of U.S. state libraries and archives
- National Register of Historic Places listings in Center Township, Marion County, Indiana

== Sources ==
- In Memory of Howard Henry Peckham (PDF). The Quarto. 1995. Archived from the original (PDF) on October 29, 2015.
