= Myra Reynolds Richards =

American sculptor and teacher (1882–1934)

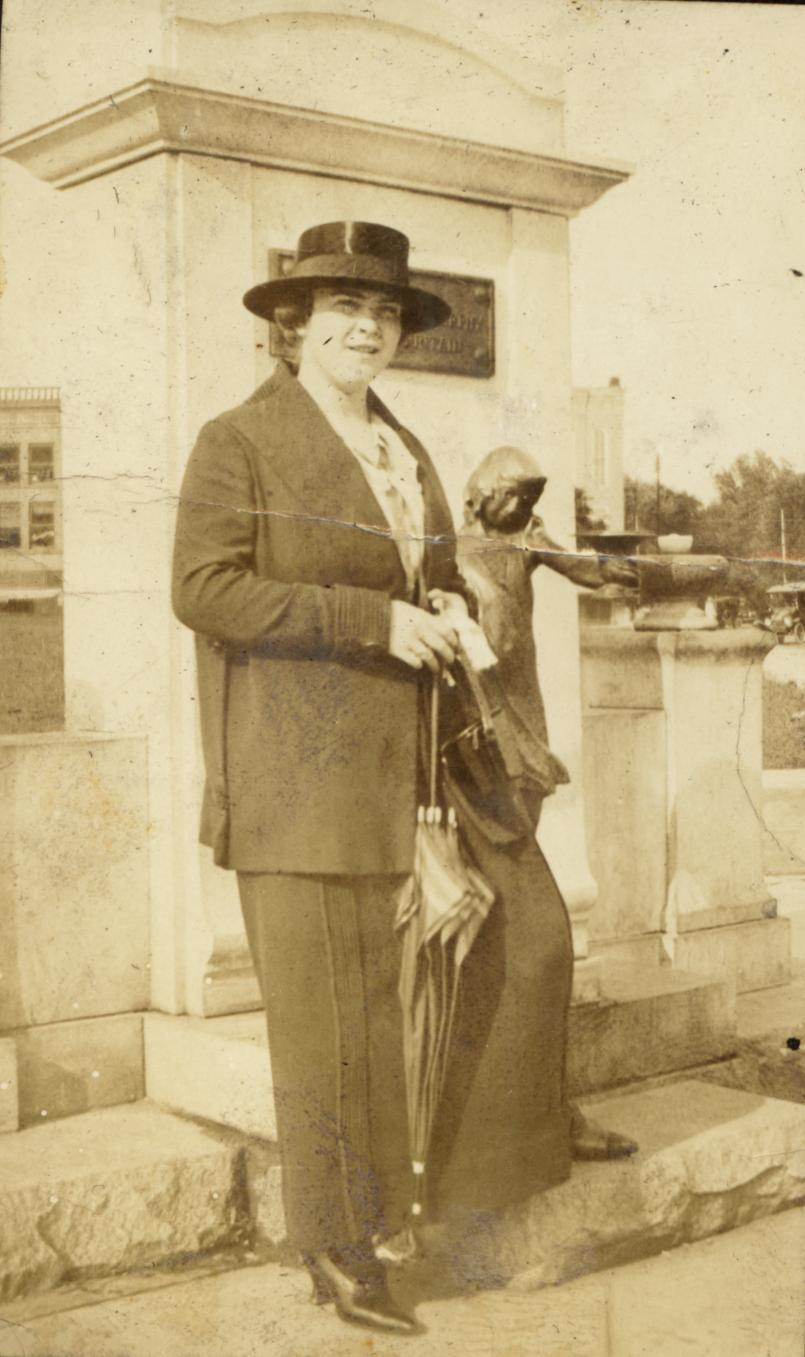
- The sculptor Myra Reynolds Richards stands in front of the bronze sculpture she made in 1918 for the Murphy Memorial Drinking Fountain in Delphi, Indiana.
- Born: 1882; Indianapolis, Indiana
- Died: 1934 (aged 51–52)
- Education: John Herron Art Institute
- Known for: sculpture

Myra Reynolds Richards (31 January 1882 – 1934) was an American sculptor and teacher. She was born in Indianapolis. She studied at the Herron Art Institute in Indianapolis mainly under Mary Y. Robinson, Roda Selleck, and Otto Stark, J. Ottis Adams, William Forsyth, Clifton Wheeler, Rudolf Schwarz, and George Julian Zolnay. She also studied in New York under Isidore Konti and in Paris with Charles Despiau at the Académie Scandinave.

She was an instructor of anatomy and modeling class at the Herron Art Institute, Indianapolis from 1918 to 1920. She become the head of department of anatomy and sculpture at Herron Art Institute before her resignation at 1929.

== Selected works ==
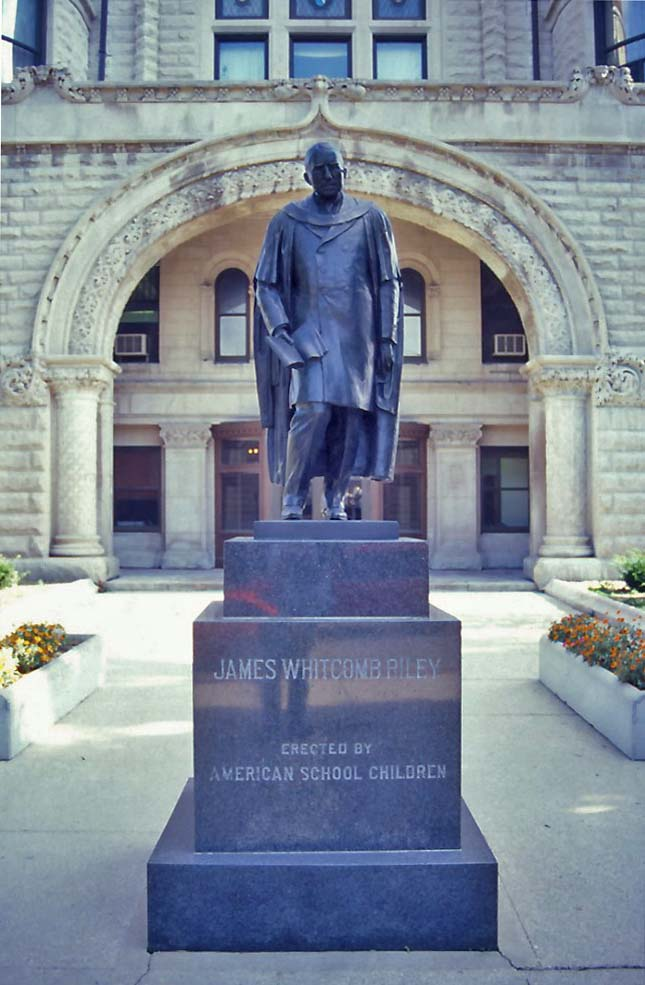
James Whitcomb Riley, 1918

- James Whitcomb Riley statue, Hancock County Courthouse, Greenfield, Indiana, 1918
- Murphy Memorial Drinking Fountain, at the Carroll County Courthouse, 1918
- Pan, 1923. Richards' Pan was stolen in 1970 and the current work is a replacement.
- Syrinx, 1923. Richards' Syrinx was stolen in 1959 and the current statue is a replacement.
- The Bird Boy, 1924, at the Columbus Central Middle School
