= Pan (White) =

Sculpture by Roger White (1980)

- Artist: Roger White (sculptor)
- Year: 1980
- Type: Bronze, limestone
- Dimensions: 76 cm × 36 cm × 48 cm (30 in × 14 in × 19 in)
- Location: Indianapolis, Indiana, United States; 39°46′19″N 86°9′27″W
- Owner: City of Indianapolis

Pan is a 1980 public artwork by sculptor Roger White located at the Indiana World War Memorial Plaza in Indianapolis, Indiana, United States. This work was originally surveyed in 1993 as part of the Smithsonian's Save Outdoor Sculpture! program. A former water fountain, this piece is part of a National Historic Landmark District.

== Description ==
It is a bronze figure of Pan sitting on a limestone tree stump. Pan is nude and his furry proper right knee is bent upwards to his chest with his other leg hangs over the side of the stump. The satyr holds a pan flute in his hand, holding it up to his mouth, as if playing it for nearby Syrinx.

== Information ==
Pan was originally designed by Myra Reynolds Richards. Richards' original Syrinx and Pan sculptures were dedicated in 1923. Eventually, both pieces were stolen, with Syrinx disappearing in 1959 and Pan c. 1970. The parks department commissioned Adolph Wolter to replace the pieces, and in 1973 they were reinstalled in their current location in University Park at the Indiana World War Memorial Plaza. However, Wolter's Pan would eventually be stolen as well, and sculptor Roger White was commissioned to replace the piece. Pan was replaced in 1980 by White.

Carol M. Highsmith photographed the sculpture in September 2016.

== Gallery ==
Label for Pan
