= Carvings (Indiana State Library) =

Sculptures by Leon Hermant

- Artist: Léon Hermant
- Year: 1934
- Type: Limestone
- Dimensions: 200 cm × 200 cm × 13 cm (80 in × 80 in × 5 in)
- Location: Indianapolis, Indiana, United States; 39°46′11″N 86°9′49″W
- Owner: Indiana State Library

Carvings (Indiana State Library), is a series of bas-relief limestone panels decorating the facade of the Indiana State Library in Indianapolis, Indiana, United States. The reliefs were designed by artist Léon Hermant and carved by German sculptor Adolph Wolter in 1934. The panels on the east facade are approximately 80 by 80 by 5 inches (2,030 mm × 2,030 mm × 130 mm), the low panels on the east facade are approximately 18 by 18 by 1 1/2 inches (457 mm × 457 mm × 38 mm) inches, and the classical figures are each approximately 3 by 2 by 1/4 foot (0.914 m × 0.610 m × 0.076 m) . The library building was dedicated December 7, 1934.

== Description ==
The Indiana State Library Carvings are a series of bas-relief limestone panels. Located beneath the cornice line on the east side of the building, ten square relief panels depict the founding and growth of the state of Indiana. The first panel, the Explorer, illustrates La Salle at portage between the St. Joseph and Kankakee Rivers. The next panel, the Soldier, shows George Rogers Clark and the capture of Vincennes. The next panel depicts the Pioneer followed by a panel depicting the Farmer. Next is a panel depicting the Legislator and the signing of the state constitution; followed by panels of the Miner, the Builder, the Manufacturer, the Educator and the Aspiring Student. Above the ground floor windows, a second set of eight relief panels depict an Indian with a peace pipe, the Trapper, the Priest, the Pioneer, the Plainsman, Invention (a movie camera), Transportation (an airplane), and Arts (an artist with brushes and pencils).

On the south side of the building, individual figures represent: Science, History, Invention, and Religion. Figures on the north side represent: Philosophy, Art, Charity, and Justice. Above the building's entrance is an owl holding a book open with its proper left claw. On each side of the entrance is a seated female classical figure sitting back to back, each writing on a tablet with her proper right hand.
