= Louis Pasteur Memorial =

1928 sculpture in Chicago, Illinois, U.S.

- The monument's inauguration, 1928
- Location: Chicago, Illinois, U.S.; 41°52′29.2″N 87°40′21.8″W

The Louis Pasteur Memorial, also known as the Louis Pasteur Monument, is a sculpture by Edward H. Bennett and Léon Hermant, installed by the Cook County Hospital in Chicago, Illinois, United States. The monument has a bronze bust on a marble shaft. The shaft has sculptures of a draped woman and two children.

The memorial in 2026

== See also ==
- List of things named after Louis Pasteur
