= American Legion Soldier =

Public artwork in Washington, D.C., United States

- Artist: Adolph Wolter
- Year: 1951
- Type: Indiana limestone
- Dimensions: 400 cm (13 ft)
- Location: Washington, D.C., United States; 38°54′8.12″N 77°2′14.44″W
- Owner: American Legion

American Legion Soldier is a public artwork by German-born American artist Adolph Wolter, located at the American Legion building on K Street, N.W. in Washington, D.C., United States. "American Legion Soldier" was surveyed as part of the Smithsonian's Save Outdoor Sculpture! program in 1993.

== Description ==
This sculpture depicts a male figure dressed in a combination of World War I and World War II battle fatigues. His shirt is unbuttoned and dogtags hang around his neck. A rifle is slung over his right shoulder and he holds a grenade in his left hand. He wears a helmet on his head and his pants are tucked into his boots. He steps on a snake with his right foot, the snake represents the enemy. The sculpture is installed on a small ledge on the facade of the American Legion building, forty feet above the sidewalk.

== History ==
The model for the sculpture was Lt. Hulon B. Whittington who won a Medal of Honor in World War II. The sculpture, which was carved by Frank Bowden, was carved in ninety days at Adolph Wolter's studio in Indianapolis, Indiana.

The sculpture cost $5,200 to produce and erect. It was dedicated on August 14, 1951, and President Harry S. Truman spoke at the dedication ceremony.

== See also ==
- List of public art in Washington, D.C., Ward 2
