= Adolph Wolter =

American sculptor

Adolph Gustav Wolter von Ruemelin (September 7, 1903 – October 15, 1980), transplanted sculptor in Indiana, was born on September 7, 1903, in Reutlingen (Baden-Württemberg), Germany, in the southern region of that country. The second of three sons, he was educated in the local schools and confirmed in the town's Roman Catholic Church where his father Karl Wolter was chief sculptor. He graduated from the local school, and as a teenager attended the community's technical school (Gewerbeschule) serving a three-year sculpturing apprenticeship with his father where he studied architecture, stone, and metal. In due course he matriculated to the Academy of Fine Arts (now called Die Staatliche Akademie der Bildenden Kunste) in Stuttgart, where students enjoyed a reputation for their self-motivation and initiative.

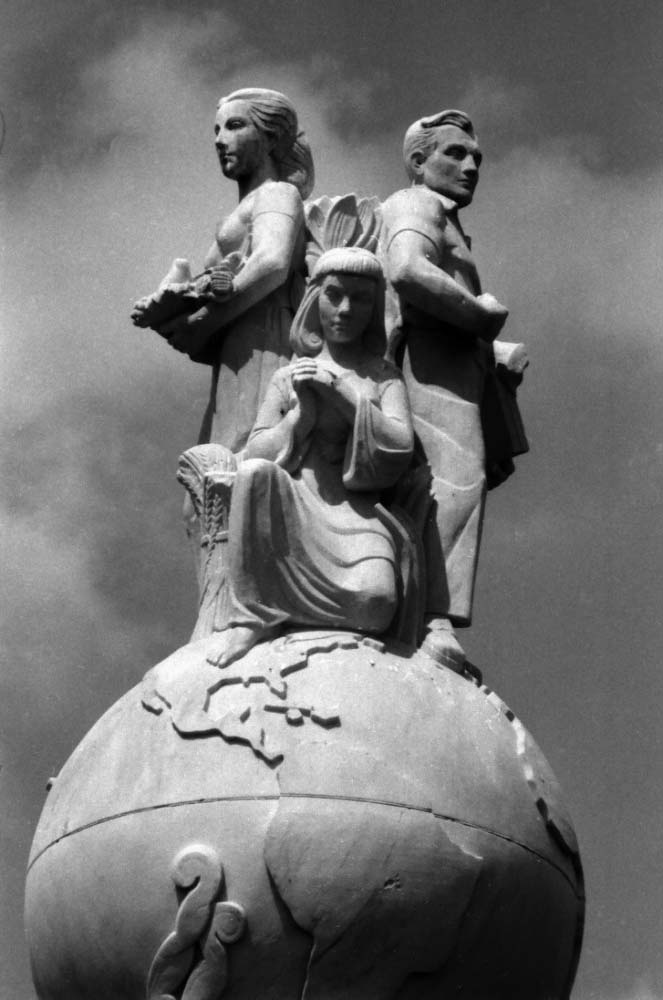
Four Freedoms Monument

During the 1930s, he studied at the John Herron Art Institute in Indianapolis, where sculptor David K. Rubins was his primary teacher. Wolter himself later became an art teacher at the Indianapolis Art League, taught classes in his studios, and served as professor of Restorative Arts at the Indiana College of Mortuary Science for several years.

In central Indiana Wolter carried a heavy load of professional responsibilities in the class room, lecture-demonstrations of his craft before varied audiences both within and outside the city, TV appearances, exhibitions, commissioned works, and membership and activities with several art groups, including the Indianapolis Art League. He also wrote and illustrated articles for Design Magazine.

The 1940s and 1950s were both the busiest and most productive of Wolter's life. He found time to serve as an art consultant for several companies in New York City, Vermont, Kentucky, Ohio, and Indiana. These services involved designing trade marks, medallions, busts, reliefs, and advertising. In June 1946, Wolter married Evelyn C. Martz and started a family. But his life was wrapped up in his work, so much so that his divorce from Evelyn in the early 1960s may have been at least in part due to his dedication to his art. They reunited and remarried after a separation of two years in November 1963.

His studios were located variously at 1031 Carrollton Avenue (1959), 616 E. 58th Street (1960), in the Liberty Building at 107 S. Capitol Avenue (1964), 5677 N. Delaware Street (at the time of his death), and perhaps elsewhere.

After his years of working and teaching in Indianapolis he moved to Fort Lauderdale, Florida, in 1969 for a brief time. He returned to Indiana and finished out his professional career.

In September 1975, he journeyed back to Reutlingen to present an honorary Indianapolis key to the mayor as a token of friendship between the two cities. On September 26, 1975, the local newspaper, the Reutlingen General-Anzeiger, expressed the city's appreciation to the citizens of Indianapolis for their friendship to the German city.

Wolter died on October 15, 1980, in Indianapolis' Methodist Hospital, survived by his wife Evelyn and a daughter and son from his wife's previous marriage whom he had adopted. A memorial service in Second Presbyterian Church followed two days later.

Historians, students, and art aficionados remember his lecture-demonstrations and exhibitions. He won several prizes, including the Forty-fifth Annual Exhibit of the Indiana Artists Club in 1977 for his "Violinist," and his 24-foot (7.3 m) tall Four Freedoms Monument in the White Chapel Cemetery in Troy, Michigan. Other works include: the Louis Chevrolet Memorial designed by Fred Wellman and sculpted by Wolter at the Indianapolis Motor Speedway, commemorating the contributions of the auto designer and racer; Wolter's contributions to Second Presbyterian Church and to Broadway United Methodist Church; a Presidential Chain of Office presented to Butler University's president; the life-size bust of Crispus Attucks; two figures ("Spiritual Victory" and "Resurrection") on either side of the door of the Mt. Vernon Mausoleum and the "Hand of God" above them at Washington Park East Cemetery in Indianapolis; and finally, his sculpted Greek mythological gods Pan and Syrinx to replace the stolen originals in University Park in Indianapolis (although his sculpture of Pan was itself later stolen and replaced).

== Sources ==
Materials in the collection

"Adolph Wolter," Clipping Files, Indiana Historical Society, Indianapolis

Dale Caldwell, Staff member, Second Presbyterian Church, Indianapolis

Fort Lauderdale News and Sun-Sentinel, May 17, 1970

Indianapolis News, October 16 and& 22, 1980

Indianapolis Star, October 16, 1980

Indianapolis Times, June 27, 1959, and November 12, 1963

== Selected works ==
- Carved relief panels for the Indiana State Library Building, Indianapolis, 1933.
- Four Freedoms Monument, White Chapel Cemetery, Troy, Michigan, 1948.
- Syrinx, University Park, Indianapolis, Indiana, 1973.
- American Legion Soldier, American Legion Building, Washington D.C., 1951.
- St. Mary of the Woods, St Mary of the Woods College, Saint Mary of the Woods, Indiana, 1965.
- Louis Chevrolet Memorial, Indianapolis Motor Speedway, Speedway, Indiana, 1975.
