= Henry Hering =

American sculptor (1874–1949)

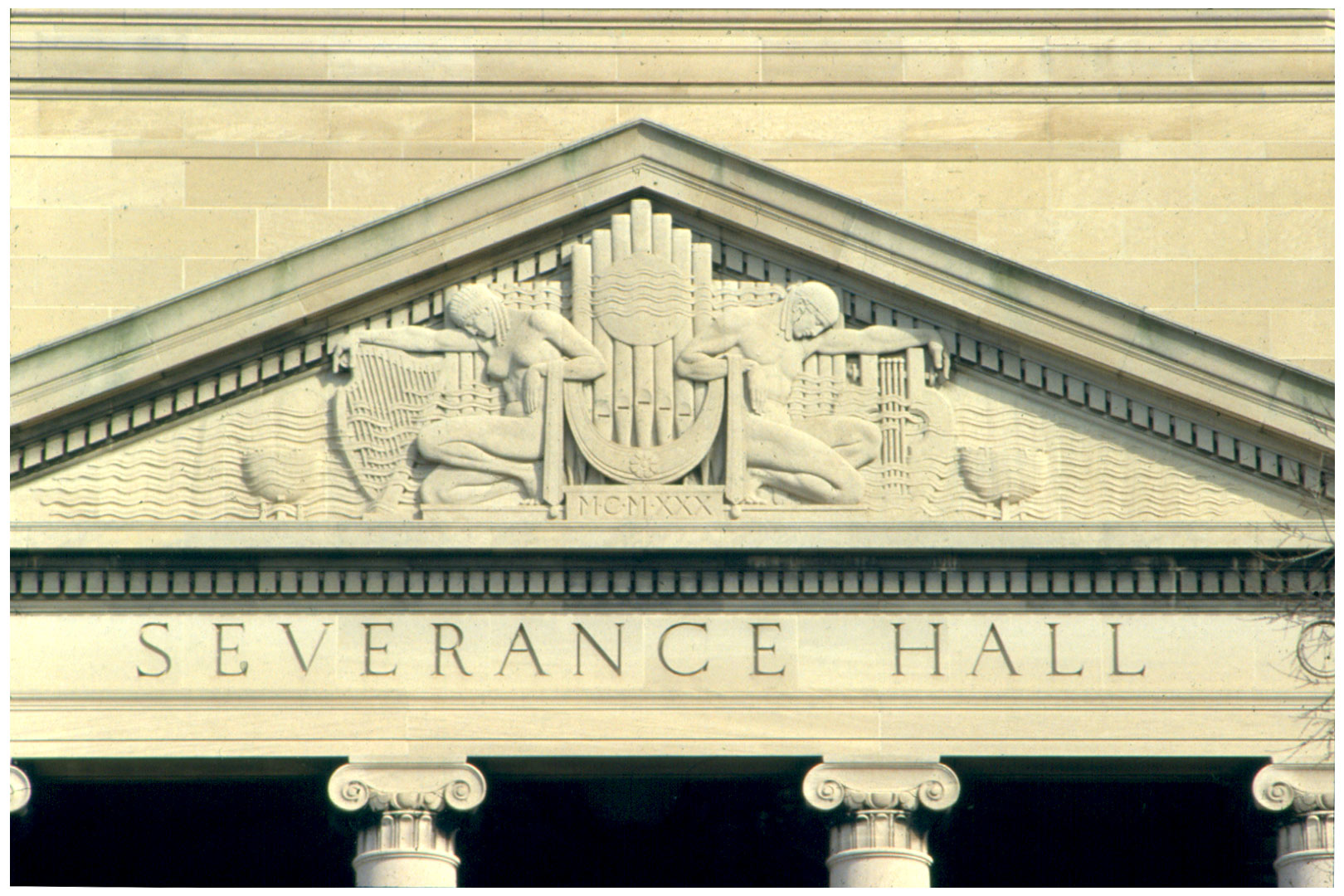
Pediment on Severance Hall

Henry Hering (February 15, 1874 – January 15, 1949) was an American sculptor.

== Early career ==
He was a student of Augustus Saint-Gaudens at Cooper Union and of Philip Martiny at the Art Students League of New York. He then went to Paris where he studied at the École des Beaux-Arts.

== Later career ==
Following his return from Paris, Hering worked as an assistant to Augustus Saint-Gaudens until Saint-Gaudens' death in 1907. In 1910, Hering married another long time Saint-Gaudens' assistant, Elsie Ward, who gave up her independent career as a sculptor, to serve as her husband's assistant.

Henry Hering is well known for his work as an architectural sculptor. Much of his work consists of allegorical figures done in the Beaux-Arts tradition, although a few of his later works, such as the detailing in Severance Hall and the Hope Memorial Bridge in Cleveland, Ohio, were done in the Art Deco style. In 1928, he was elected into the National Academy of Design as an Associate member and became a full Academician in 1937. His work was also part of the sculpture event in the art competition at the 1932 Summer Olympics.

Hering is further remembered in relation to the crash of an American B-25 military airplane into New York City's Empire State Building on July 28, 1945. The largest sections of the plane remained lodged in the building, or fell directly to the streets below. However, one engine ripped from its wing and traveled some distance away before landing in Hering's top floor penthouse studio, located in a building near the crash. At the time, newspaper coverage of the accident reported that, although the artist was not in his studio at the time, about $75,000 worth of his work was destroyed.

He died in New York City in 1949.

== Legacy and reappraisal ==
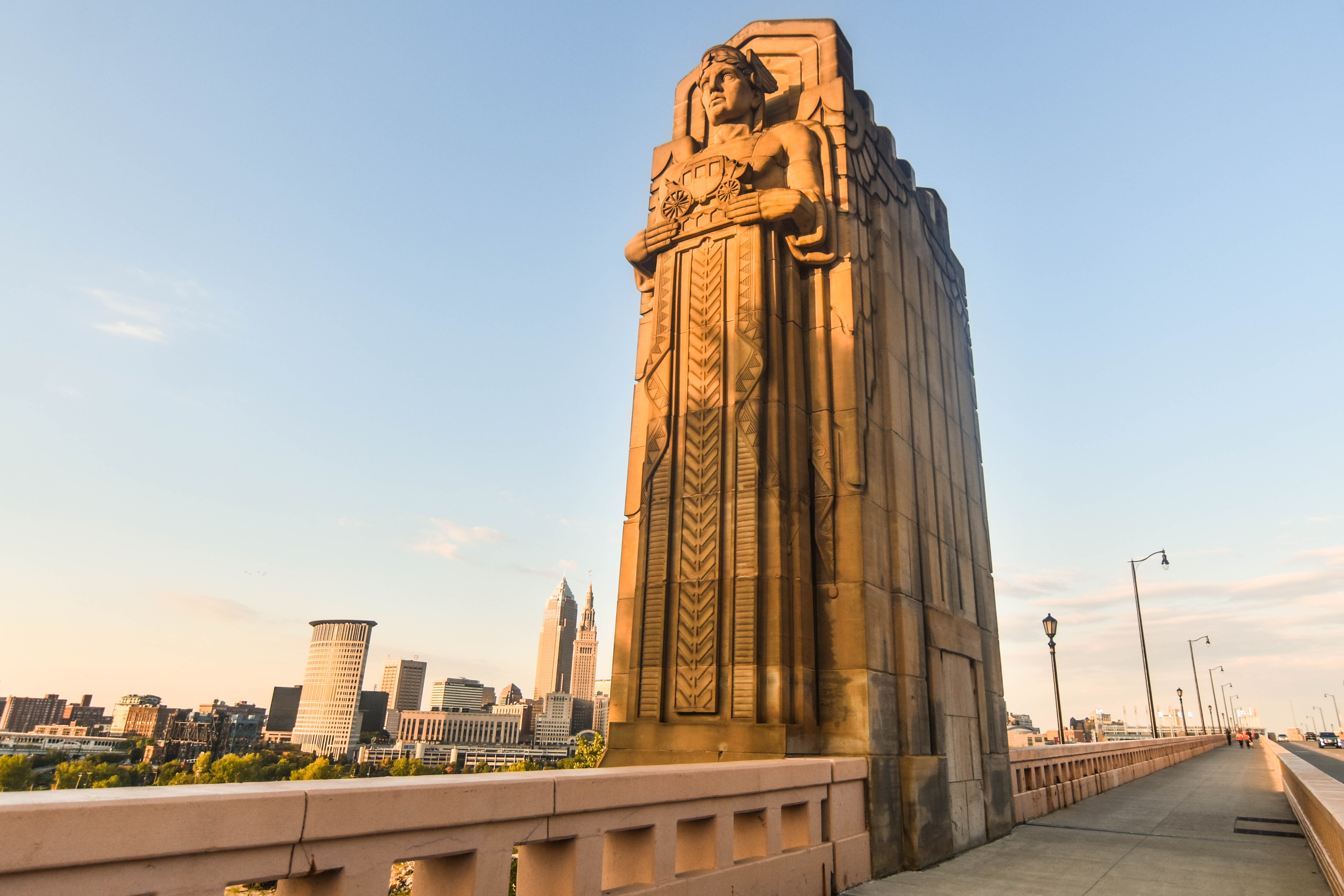
One of Hering's eight 1932 Guardians of Traffic which stand on either side of the Hope Memorial Bridge in Cleveland, Ohio

Hering's reputation as a sculptor decreased as International Modernism dispensed with architectural, figurative and allegorical work. As with many other such artists Hering's oeuvre is now being reexamined in a more positive light.

The National Sculpture Society gives out the Henry Hering Award for noteworthy collaboration between sculptor and architect.

On July 23, 2021, Cleveland's Major League Baseball franchise announced plans to replace its "Indians" nickname with the "Guardians", taking inspiration from Hering's eight monumental Guardians of Traffic statues on Hope Memorial Bridge.

== Notable public works ==
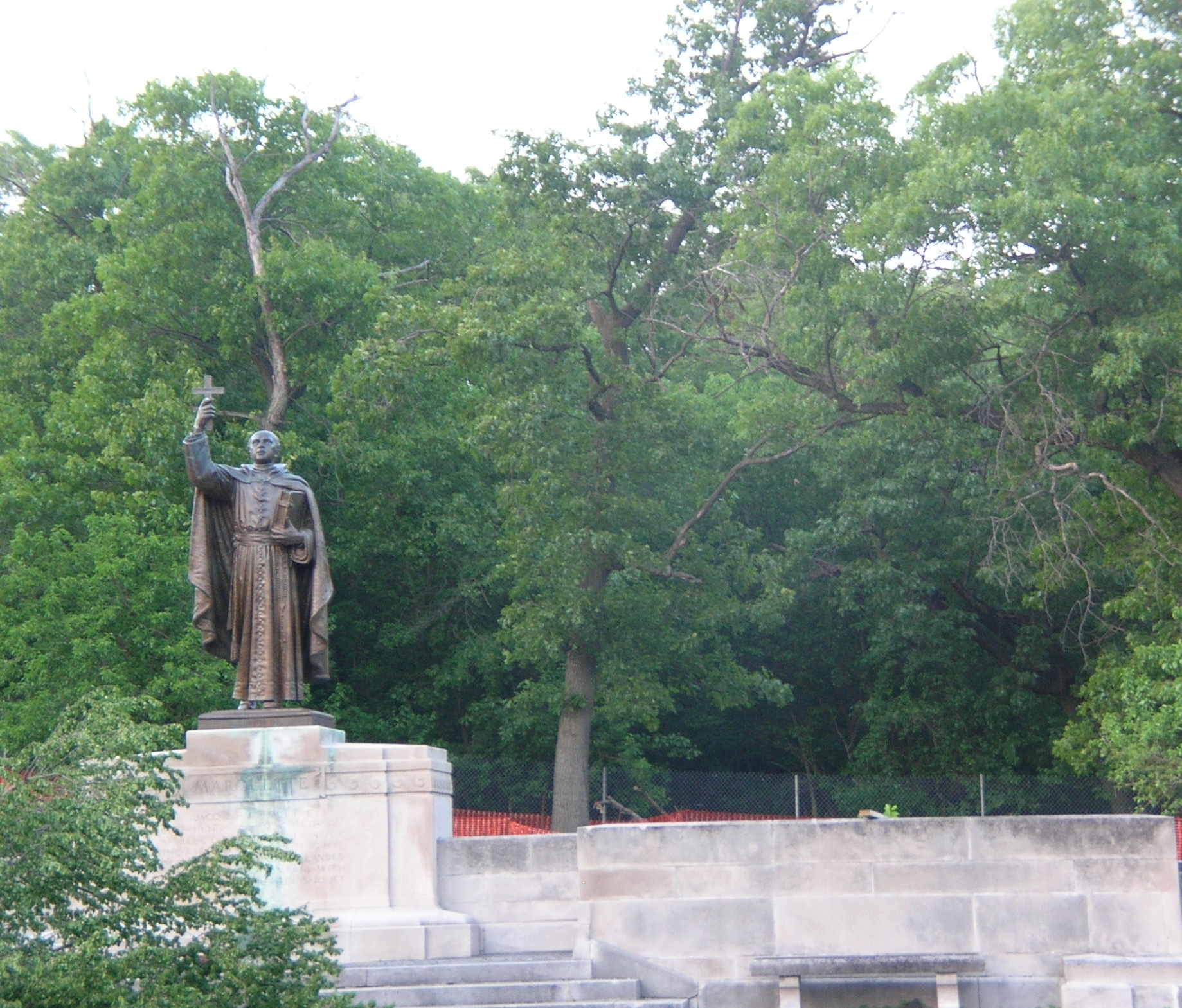
Hering's Pere Marquette statue in Marquette Park, Gary

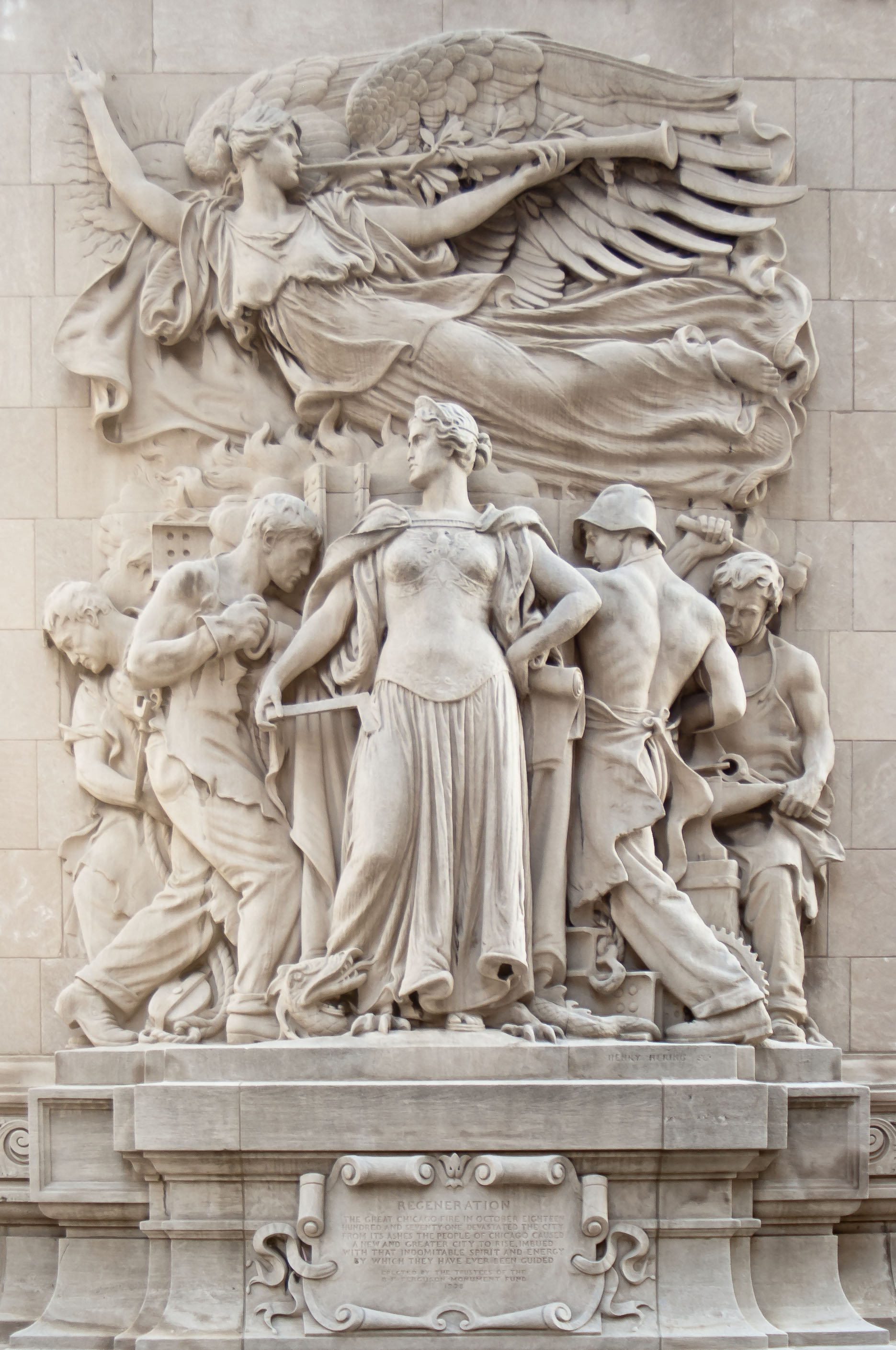
The relief sculpture Regeneration on the side of a bridgehouse of the DuSable Bridge in Chicago

- Science, Research, Record, and The Dissemination of Knowledge, Field Museum of Natural History, 1917
- Energy in Repose, Federal Reserve Bank, Cleveland, Ohio, 1923
- Day and Night, Amtrak Chicago Union Station, Chicago, Illinois, 1925 http://www.thechicagoloop.org/s.usta.figu.00000.html
- Defense and Regeneration, on the southern bridgehouses of the DuSable Bridge, Chicago, Illinois, 1928
- Pro Patria Indiana War Memorial, Indianapolis, Indiana, 1929, Walker & Weeks. architects. This male nude was the largest bronze statue to have been cast in America at that time. A lively interest in Hering's work still exists; a version standing 33½" high was auctioned late in 2007 for $9,000.
- Pere Marquette, Marquette Park, Gary, Indiana, 1932
- The Guardians of Traffic sculptures adorning the Hope Memorial Bridge, Cleveland, 1932
- Abraham Lincoln, University Park, Indianapolis, Indiana, 1934
- Peace, Peace Gardens, Cleveland, Ohio, 1936

== General references ==
- Bach, Ira, editor, Chicago's Famous Buildings, University of Chicago Press, Chicago, Illinois, 1980
- Johannesen, Eric, A Cleveland Legacy: The Architecture of Walker and Weeks, Kent State University, Kent, Ohio, 1999
- Kvaran and Lockley, A Guide to Architectural Sculpture in America, unpublished manuscript
- National Sculpture Society, Contemporary American Sculpture 1929, National Sculpture Society, New York, NY 1929
- Opitz, Glenn B, Editor, Mantle Fielding's Dictionary of American Painters, Sculptors & Engravers, Apollo Book, Poughkeepsie NY, 1986
- Proske, Beatrice Gilman, Brookgreen Gardens Sculpture, Brookgreen Gardens, South Carolina, 1968
