= 1920 in literature =

This article contains information about the literary events and publications of 1920.

== Events ==
- February 2 – Beyond the Horizon, Eugene O'Neill's second full-length play, opens with a Morosco Theatre matinée in New York City, partly as a producer's experiment and partly to quiet the actor Richard Bennett, who sought to play the lead. Reviewers hail the play and O'Neill gains fame.
- February 27 – An inaugural meeting of the Bloomsbury Group's Memoir Club is arranged by Mary MacCarthy in London.
- Spring – The poet Anton Podbevšek and others organize the Novo Mesto Spring (Novomeška pomlad) event, the beginning of Slovenian Modernism.
- March 15 – The Blue Flame, a four-act play by George V. Hobart and John Willard after Leta Vance Nicholson, opens at the Shubert Theatre (New York City) on Broadway before a year's U.S. tour. Though described by a critic as "one of the worst plays ever written," it is a commercial success, largely due to Theda Bara as the central character of a vamp.
- March 22 – Federico García Lorca's first play, The Butterfly's Evil Spell (El maleficio de la mariposa) is poorly received at its première in Madrid.
- March 26 – This Side of Paradise by F. Scott Fitzgerald sets him up as a writer and celebrity. An initial 3,000 copies sell out in three days. The book's reputation dims in later years, but Dorothy Parker will recall that it was seen as innovative when it first appeared.
- April
  - Hart Crane publishes his poem "My Grandmother's Love Letters" in The Dial, his first major move toward recognition as a poet.
  - The pulp magazine Black Mask is launched in New York City as "An Illustrated Magazine of Detective Mystery, Adventure, Romance, and Spiritualism" by journalist H. L. Mencken and drama critic George Jean Nathan.

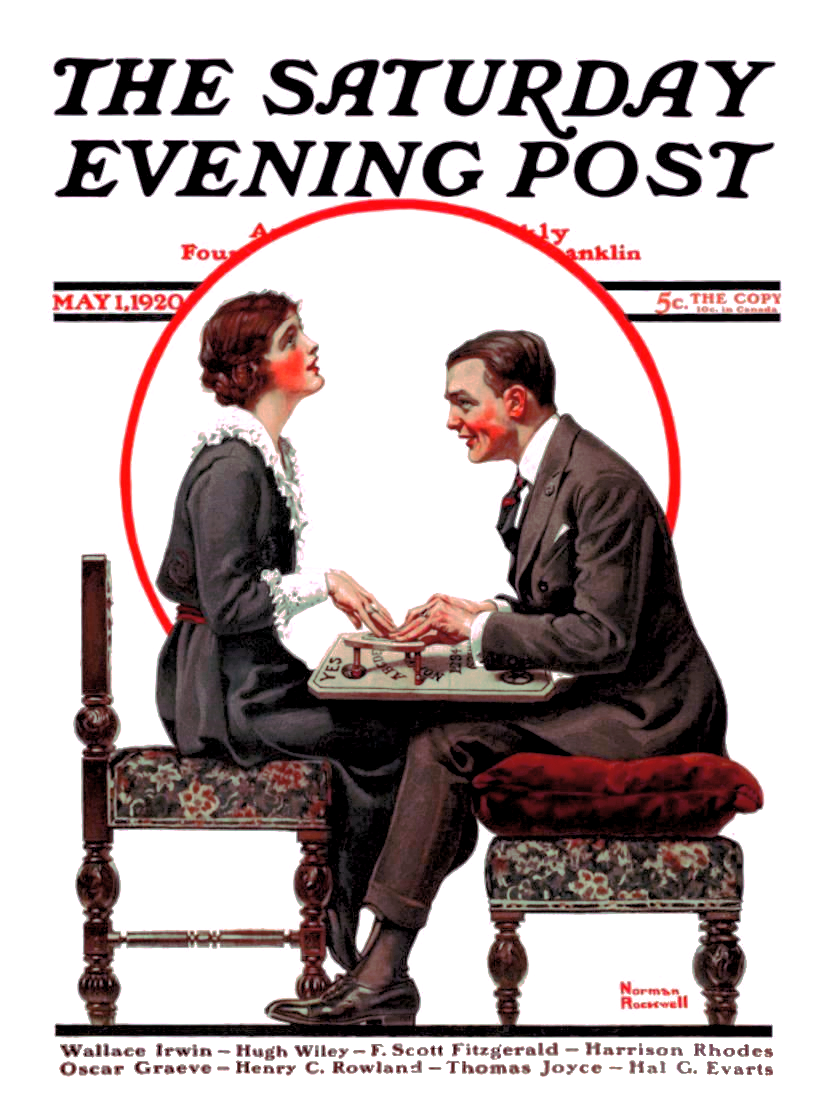
F. Scott Fitzgerald's story "Bernice Bobs Her Hair" was published in May 1920.

- April 3 – F. Scott Fitzgerald marries Zelda Sayre in the rectory of St. Patrick's Cathedral (Manhattan).
- May 1 – F. Scott Fitzgerald's short story "Bernice Bobs Her Hair" appears in the Saturday Evening Post and on the magazine's cover, illustrated by artist Norman Rockwell.
- July – Krishna Lal Adhikari's Makaiko Kheti (The Cultivation of Maize) is published in Nepal; following claims that it contains "mischievous expressions to treason", the author is sentenced on August 2 to nine years in prison (where he will die in 1923) and all known copies of the book are destroyed.
- August 22 – The Salzburg Festival in Austria is inaugurated with a performance of Hugo von Hofmannsthal's play Jedermann (Everyman, 1911) in front of Salzburg Cathedral, directed by Max Reinhardt.
- October – Agatha Christie's first novel, The Mysterious Affair at Styles, appears in the U.S., introducing her long-running Belgian detective Hercule Poirot in the setting of an English country house. The book is published in the U.K. on January 21, 1921.
- November 1 – Eugene O'Neill's The Emperor Jones plays at the Playwright's Theater in New York City with Charles Sidney Gilpin in the title role.
- November 9 – D. H. Lawrence's novel Women in Love appears in a limited U.S. subscribers' edition.
- December – The first edition of the Poems of the English war poet Wilfred Owen, killed in action in 1918, appears in London, introduced by his friend Siegfried Sassoon but with much of the editing carried out by Edith Sitwell. Only five of Owen's verses having been published in his lifetime, the collection introduces his work to many readers. It includes the 1917 poems "Anthem for Doomed Youth" and "Dulce et Decorum est", one of the best-known poetic condemnations of war.
- December 23 – Arthur Schnitzler's play Reigen (La Ronde, 1900) receives a first authorized performance, in Berlin, where it is criticized on moral and anti-Semitic grounds.
- Christmas – Monteiro Lobato's children's story "A Menina do Narizinho Arrebitado" (Girl with the Upturned Nose), the origin of the Sítio do Picapau Amarelo novel series, is published in Brazil.
- unknown dates
  - Erwin von Busse, using the pseudonym Granand, publishes Das erotische Komödiengärtlein (Berlin Garden of Erotic Delights), a collection of short stories about sexually charged encounters between men. It is promptly banned.
  - Karel Čapek's drama R.U.R: Rossum's Universal Robots, published in Prague, introduces the word robot into English.
  - Publication in Paris of the first volume of the Collection Budé initiates editions of classical texts with parallel French translation: Plato's Hippias Minor (Hippias Mineur).
  - Van Wyck Brooks' The Ordeal of Mark Twain controversially argues that Twain was "a victim of arrested development" with a dual personality. It begins a reassessment of an author seen hitherto mainly as a humorous writer. The 1920s will bring similar reconsideration of many 19th-century American writers, notably Herman Melville and Emily Dickinson.

== New books ==
=== Fiction ===
- Sherwood Anderson – Poor White
- E. F. Benson – Queen Lucia
- Marjorie Bowen – The Burning Glass
- Rhoda Broughton – A Fool in Her Folly
- Emilio Carrere – The Tower of the Seven Hunchbacks (La Torre de los Siete Jorobados)
- Catherine Carswell – Open the Door!
- Agatha Christie – The Mysterious Affair at Styles (first Hercule Poirot mystery)
- Colette – Chéri
- Joseph Conrad – The Rescue
- Freeman Wills Crofts – The Cask
- William Aubrey Darlington – Alf's Button
- Miguel de Unamuno
  - Tres novelas ejemplares y un prólogo (Three Exemplary Novels and a Prologue)
  - Tulio Montalbán
- Grazia Deledda – Le Madre (The Mother)
- Ethel M. Dell – The Top of the World
- Suat Derviş – Kara Kitap (Black Book)
- Alfred Döblin – Wallenstein
- John Dos Passos – Three Soldiers
- Hans Fallada – Der junge Goedeschal (Young Goedeschal)
- F. Scott Fitzgerald – This Side Of Paradise
- F. Scott Fitzgerald – Flappers and Philosophers
- Zona Gale – Miss Lulu Bett
- John Galsworthy
  - In Chancery
  - Awakening
- Frederic S. Isham – The Nut Cracker
- Edgar Jepson – The Loudwater Mystery
- D. H. Lawrence – Women in Love
- Sinclair Lewis – Main Street
- David Lindsay – A Voyage to Arcturus
- Mrs. I. Lowenberg – The Voices
- Marie Belloc Lowndes – The Lonely House
- Compton Mackenzie – The Vanity Girl
- E. Phillips Oppenheim – The Great Impersonation
- Dowell Philip O'Reilly – Five Corners
- Ernest Pérochon – Nêne
- Marcel Proust – The Guermantes Way (Le Côté de Guermantes I, first part of vol. 3 of In Search of Lost Time)
- Erich Remark – The Dream Room (Die Traumbude)
- Maurice Renard – The Hands of Orlac
- Merari Siregar – Azab dan Sengsara (Pain and Suffering)
- Sigrid Undset – Kristin Lavransdatter (begins publication with Kransen – The Bridal Wreath)
- Edgar Wallace – The Daffodil Mystery
- Mary Augusta Ward – Harvest
- Mary Webb – The House in Dormer Forest
- Edith Wharton – The Age of Innocence
- Owen Wister – A Straight Deal
- Zara Wright – Black and White Tangled Threads
- Francis Brett Young – The Tragic Bride

=== Children and young people ===
- L. Frank Baum – Glinda of Oz
- Edgar Rice Burroughs – Tarzan the Untamed
- R. A. H. Goodyear – Forge of Foxenby
- Hugh Lofting – The Story of Doctor Dolittle
- Olive Beaupré Miller – In the Nursery (first in the My Book House series)
- Opal Whiteley – The Story of Opal: The Journal of an Understanding Heart
- I. C. Vissarion – Ber-Căciulă

=== Drama ===
- S. Ansky – The Dybbuk (first performed, in author's Yiddish translation as דֶער דִבּוּק צִווִישֶן צְווַיי ווֶעלְטֶן, Tzvishn Zwey Weltn – der Dibuk)
- J. M. Barrie
  - A Kiss For Cinderella
  - Mary Rose
- Karel Čapek – R.U.R. (Rossum's Universal Robots)
- Nikolai Evreinov – The Storming of the Winter Palace
- John Galsworthy – The Skin Game
- Walter Hackett – Mr. Todd's Experiment
- Georg Kaiser – Gas II
- Edward Knoblock – Mumsie
- Vladimir Mayakovsky – The Championship of the Universal Class Struggle
- Eugene O'Neill – The Emperor Jones
- Mary Roberts Rinehart and Avery Hopwood – The Bat
- Ernst Toller – Man and Masses (Masse Mensch)
- Louis Verneuil – Daniel
- Stanisław Ignacy Witkiewicz – They (Oni)

=== Poetry ===
- Louis Aragon – "Feu de joie"
- Edmund Blunden – The Waggoner and Other Poems
- Robert Bridges – October and Other Poems
- T. S. Eliot – Poems (Twelve poems including "Lune de Miel" and "The Hippopotamus")
- Robert Frost – Miscellaneous Poems
- Aaro Hellaakoski – Me Kaksi
- Bolesław Leśmian – Meadow (Łąka)
- Edna St. Vincent Millay – A Few Figs From Thistles
- Hope Mirrlees – Paris: A Poem
- Wilfred Owen – Poems
- Ezra Pound – Hugh Selwyn Mauberley
- Carl Sandburg – Smoke and Steel
- Siegfried Sassoon – Picture Show
- Barbu Solacolu – Umbre pe drumuri (Shadows on the Roads)
- Anton Schnack – Tier rang gewaltig mit Tier (Beast Strove Mightily with Beast)
- Georg Trakl – Der Herbst des Einsamen (The Autumn of the Lonely)
- Miguel de Unamuno – El Cristo de Velázquez

=== Non-fiction ===
- Sarah Bernhardt – Petite Idole
- Marc Bloch – Rois et serfs. Un chapitre d'histoire capétienne
- Communist International – Theses and Statutes of the Third (Communist) International
- Sigmund Freud – Beyond the Pleasure Principle (Jenseits des Lustprinzips)
- William Inge – The Idea of Progress
- Ernst Jünger – Storm of Steel (In Stahlgewittern)
- Robert T. Kerlin (editor) – The Voice of the Negro
- J. Thomas Looney – Shakespeare Identified
- H. L. Mencken – Prejudices: Second Series
- Harold Monro – Some Contemporary Poets (1920)
- Joseph Shield Nicholson – The Revival of Marxism, final book
- Charles à Court Repington – The First World War, 1914–1918
- Radu Rosetti – Povești moldovenești
- Frederick Jackson Turner – The Frontier in American History
- H. G. Wells – The Outline of History
- Leonard Woolf
  - Economic Imperialism
  - Empire and Commerce in Africa

== Births ==
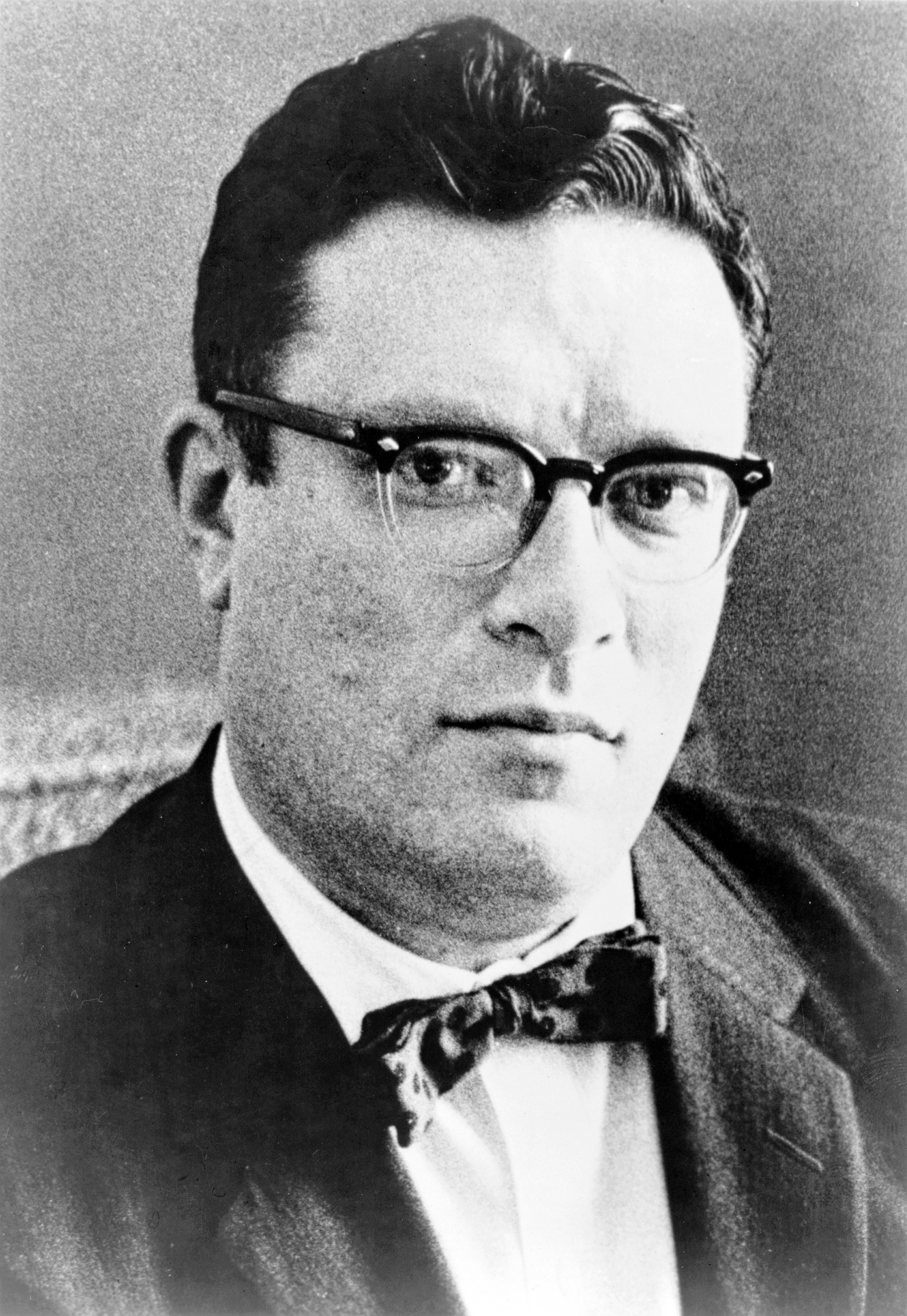
Isaac Asimov.

- January 2 (probable date) – Isaac Asimov, Russian-born American science-fiction author and biochemist (died 1992)
- January 7 – Dorothy Maclean, Canadian writer and educator, co-founder of the Findhorn Foundation (died 2020)
- January 14
  - Jean Dutourd, French novelist (died 2011)
  - Che Lan Vien, Vietnamese poet (died 1989)
- January 22 – Philippa Pearce, English children's writer (died 2006)
- January 24 – Keith Douglas, English poet (died 1944)
- February 1 – Colin Watson, English crime fiction writer (died 1983)
- February 11 – Daniel F. Galouye, American science-fiction author (died 1976)
- February 12 – William Roscoe Estep, American historian and educator (died 2000)
- February 19 – Jaan Kross, Estonian writer (died 2007)
- February 21 – Ishigaki Rin (石垣 りん), Japanese poet (died 2004)
- February 28 – Zaim Topčić, Yugoslav and Bosnian writer (died 1990)
- February 29 – Howard Nemerov, American poet (died 1991)
- March 10 – Boris Vian, French novelist (died 1959)
- March 11 – D. J. Enright, English writer (died 2002)
- March 19 – Kjell Aukrust, Norwegian author, poet and artist (died 2002)
- March 20 – Rosemary Timperley, British novelist (died 1988)
- March 25 – Paul Scott, English novelist, playwright and poet (died 1978)
- March 31 – Marga Minco (Sara Menco), Dutch novelist and journalist (died 2023)
- April 5 – Arthur Hailey, English-born Canadian novelist (died 2004)
- April 11 – Marlen Haushofer, Austrian writer (died 1970)
- April 17 – Bengt Anderberg, Swedish poet, novelist, children's writer (died 2008)
- May 8 – Sloan Wilson, American author and poet (died 2003)
- May 9 – Richard Adams, English novelist, author of Watership Down (died 2016)
- May 12 – Satya Mohan Joshi, Nepalese writer (died 2022)
- May 30 – Shōtarō Yasuoka, Japanese writer (died 2013)
- June 2 – Marcel Reich-Ranicki, Polish-born German literary critic (died 2013)
- June 8 – Gwen Harwood, Australian poet (died 1995)
- June 9 – Isobel English (Guesdon Jolliffe), English novelist (died 1994)
- June 13 – Ruth Guimarães, Afro-Brazilian classicist, fiction writer and poet (died 2014)
- June 18
  - Aster Berkhof, Belgian novelist (died 2020)
  - Rosemary Dobson, Australian poet (died 2012)
- June 20 – Amos Tutuola, Nigerian writer (died 1997)
- July 3 – Max Wilk, American playwright, screenwriter and author of fiction and nonfiction (died 2011)
- July 12 – Pierre Berton, Canadian author (died 2004)
- August 3 – P. D. James, English crime novelist (died 2014)
- August 4 – John Figueroa, Jamaican poet (died 1999)
- August 9 – Tormod Skagestad, Norwegian poet, novelist and playwright (died 1997)
- August 16 – Charles Bukowski, American writer (died 1994)
- August 18 – Harbhajan Singh, Punjabi poet and critic (died 2002)
- August 21 – Christopher Robin Milne, English writer and bookseller (died 1996)
- August 22 – Ray Bradbury, American science-fiction writer (died 2012)
- September 19 – Roger Angell, American fiction writer, editor, and essayist with The New Yorker (died 2022)
- October 7 – Daniel Vidart, Uruguayan anthropologist, writer, historian, and essayist (died 2019)
- October 8 – Frank Herbert, American science-fiction writer (died 1986)
- October 15 – Mario Puzo, American author of The Godfather (died 1999)
- October 17 – Miguel Delibes, Spanish novelist (died 2010)
- November 7 – Elaine Morgan, Welsh writer on anthropology (died 2013)
- November 16
  - Colin Thiele, Australian author (died 2006)
  - Peter Viertel, American author (died 2007)
- November 23 – Paul Celan, Romanian poet (died 1970)
- December 3 – Sheila K. McCullagh, English children's writer (died 2014)
- December 10 – Clarice Lispector, Ukrainian-born Brazilian novelist (died 1977)
- December 14 – Rosemary Sutcliff, English children's historical novelist (died 1992)
- December 15 – Albert Memmi, Tunisian writer in French (died 2020)
- December 20 – Väinö Linna, Finnish novelist (died 1992)

== Deaths ==
- January 2 – Paul Adam, French Symbolist novelist (born 1862)
- January 4 – Benito Pérez Galdós, Spanish novelist (born 1843)
- January 9 – Ella Dietz, American actress and author (born 1847)
- January 18 – Giovanni Capurro, Italian poet (born 1825)
- February 8 – Richard Dehmel, German poet (born 1863)
- February 29 – A. H. Bullen, English editor and publisher (born 1857)
- March 9 – Haralamb Lecca, Romanian dramatist, poet and translator (paralysis, born 1873)
- March 15 – Edith Holden, English diarist and illustrator (drowned, born 1871)
- March 24 – Mary Augusta Ward (Mrs. Humphry Ward), Tasmanian-born English novelist (born 1851)
- April 6 – Mary Evelyn Hitchcock, American author and explorer (born 1849)
- May 7 – Hugh Thomson, British illustrator (born 1860)
- May 8 – Annie Russell Wall, American historian, writer, teacher (born 1835)
- May 11 – William Dean Howells, American realist novelist (born 1837)
- May 15 – Owen Morgan Edwards, Welsh writer, educator (b. 1858)
- May 21 – Eleanor H. Porter, American novelist (born 1868)
- June 5
  - Rhoda Broughton, Welsh novelist and short-story writer (born 1840)
  - Julia A. Moore, American poet (born 1847)
- June 14 – Max Weber, German political economist (born 1864)
- June 27 – Adolphe Basile Routhier, Canadian poet (born 1839)
- September 29 – José Domingo Gómez Rojas, Chilean poet (meningitis, born 1896)
- October 17 – John Reed, American journalist (born 1887)
- October 20 – Bithia Mary Croker, Irish-born novelist (born c. 1848)
- October 25 – Terence MacSwiney, Irish playwright, poet and politician (hunger strike, born 1879)
- November 1 – Walter Bradford Woodgate, English boating writer and oarsman (born 1841)
- November 9 – Alberto Blest Gana, Chilean novelist (born 1830)
- November 19 – Alice E. Bartlett, American author, novelist, essayist, lyricist (born 1848)
- November 22 – Manuel Pérez y Curis, Uruguayan poet (born 1884)
- November 24 – Alexandru Macedonski, Romanian poet, novelist and dramatist (heart disease, born 1854)
- December 16 – Helen Ekin Starrett, American educator, author, suffragist and magazine founder (born 1840)
- December 18 – Matthías Jochumsson, Icelandic poet, playwright and translator (born 1835)
- December 24 – Matilda Maranda Crawford, American-Canadian newspaper correspondent, writer, poet (born 1844)

== Awards ==
- James Tait Black Memorial Prize for fiction: D. H. Lawrence, The Lost Girl
- James Tait Black Memorial Prize for biography: G. M. Trevelyan, Lord Grey of the Reform Bill
- Nobel Prize for Literature: Knut Hamsun
- Pulitzer Prize for the Novel: no award given
- Pulitzer Prize for Poetry: no award given
- Pulitzer Prize for Drama: Eugene O'Neill, Beyond the Horizon
