= Ethel Moore =

American suffragist (1872–1920)

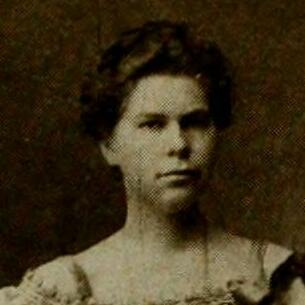
- Moore in 1898
- Born: March 6, 1872; Oakland, California, U.S.
- Died: October 4, 1920 (aged 48); San Francisco, California, U.S.
- Education: University of California; Vassar College
- Occupations: Suffragist; civic leader

Ethel Moore (March 6, 1872 – October 4, 1920) was an American suffragist and civic leader. Moore was considered a national authority in playground work, was one of the two women to be recognized by California Governor William D. Stephens when he named the state council of defense, was a trustee of Mills College and sponsor of its building program; as director in public health work, Moore was for many years a recognized leader on the Pacific coast.

== Early life and education ==
Moore was born on March 6, 1872, in Oakland, California, to Albert Alfonzo and Jacqueline Anne Moore (née Hall). She had five younger siblings. She graduated from Oakland High School, later attending the University of California for two years before she entered the all-women Vassar College. She graduated with the class of 1894.

== Career ==
Moore's time at Vassar College stimulated her interest in the welfare of women and children, and upon her return to Oakland, she in co-founded the Oakland Social Settlement. The settlement intended to give adults and children opportunities for study and recreation. She was a member of its board for 20 years, a part of which time she served as president.

Simultaneously, among Moore's friends and neighbors, she became the first president of the Home Club, original in its planning for a more cordial and democratic social intercourse of family and community.

In 1911, Moore was a leading member of the suffragette movement which brought to California women the right of suffrage. In that year, she was elected Director of the College Equal Suffrage League of Northern California.

Following this, Moore's attention turned to the education of women for civic as well as domestic efficiency. She began to help draft educational legislation and summoned the alumnae of institutions throughout the country to join in raising the standards of education in the U.S. She became sectional vice-president of the Association of Collegiate Alumnae for Arizona, Nevada, and California, and traveled from Imperial Valley to Seattle to preach to women the need of higher educational standards and the practical application of knowledge to daily living. Her vision of the relationship between differing group efforts was shown in her participation in the State Conference of Social Agencies. She brought into this California body the organized college women of the State, on the thesis that education is the greatest of the social agencies.

This same interest made Moore accept the responsibility for planning playgrounds in Oakland. Mayor Frank K. Mott appointed Moore to the first playground commission created by the city ordinance in December 1908. When the new city charter created the recreation department, Moore was reappointed in 1911, serving eight years. Her efforts received national recognition and Oakland became known for its model recreational work.

Moore was elected trustee of Mills College in 1915, and was instrumental in accomplishing the appointment of Dr. Aurelia Henry Reinhardt as president.

Moore served on the Local Section of May Wright Sewall's Home Advisory Board in preparation for the International Conference of Women Workers to Promote Permanent Peace, held in San Francisco in July, 1915.

During World War I, Governor Stephens made her one of the two women members of the California State Council of Defense. She was a chair of the Oakland Council of Defense, director of the Hoover Relief Commission for starving Belgium, an organizer of the Women's Land Army, a national director of Girls' Clubs for Community Service, and a member of the National Committee to Secure Military Rank for Army Nurses.

Moore became one of the founders of the Alameda County Society for the Study and Prevention of Tuberculosis on whose board she served for 12 years. The idea of acquiring summer camps for children and for adults grew out of contact with the needy in the Playground organization and the Tubercular Clinics. Recreational possibilities turned her creative energies to bringing to California the work of The Drama League and the American Playground Association.

Shortly before Moore's death, she became a member of the Woman's Faculty Club of the University of California. She traveled extensively. Since the death of her mother a few years before her own, she was a constant companion of her father, A. A. Moore.

== Death and legacy ==
Moore died on October 4, 1920, aged 48, in San Francisco. The Ethel Moore Residence Hall at Mills College, built in 1926, in named in her honor.
