= Frank Mott =

Frank Mott may refer to:

- Frank Luther Mott (1886–1964), American historian and journalist
- Frank K. Mott (1866–1958), mayor of Oakland, California
