= International Conference of Women Workers to Promote Permanent Peace =

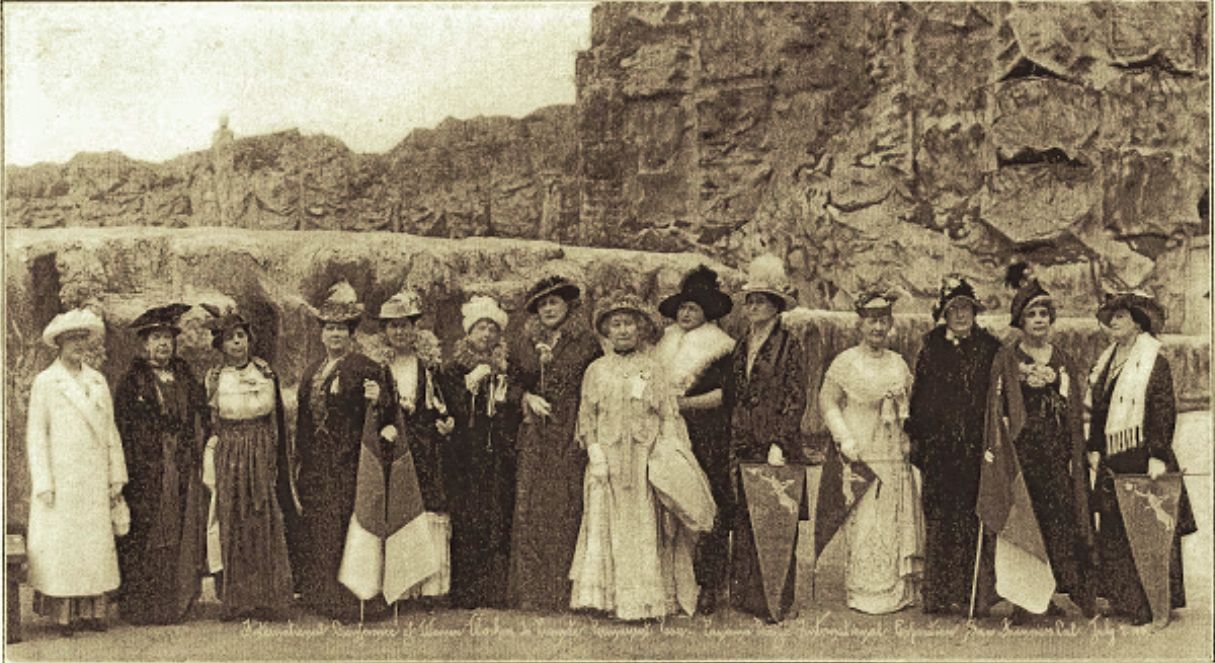
Official group photo of conference organizers (1915)

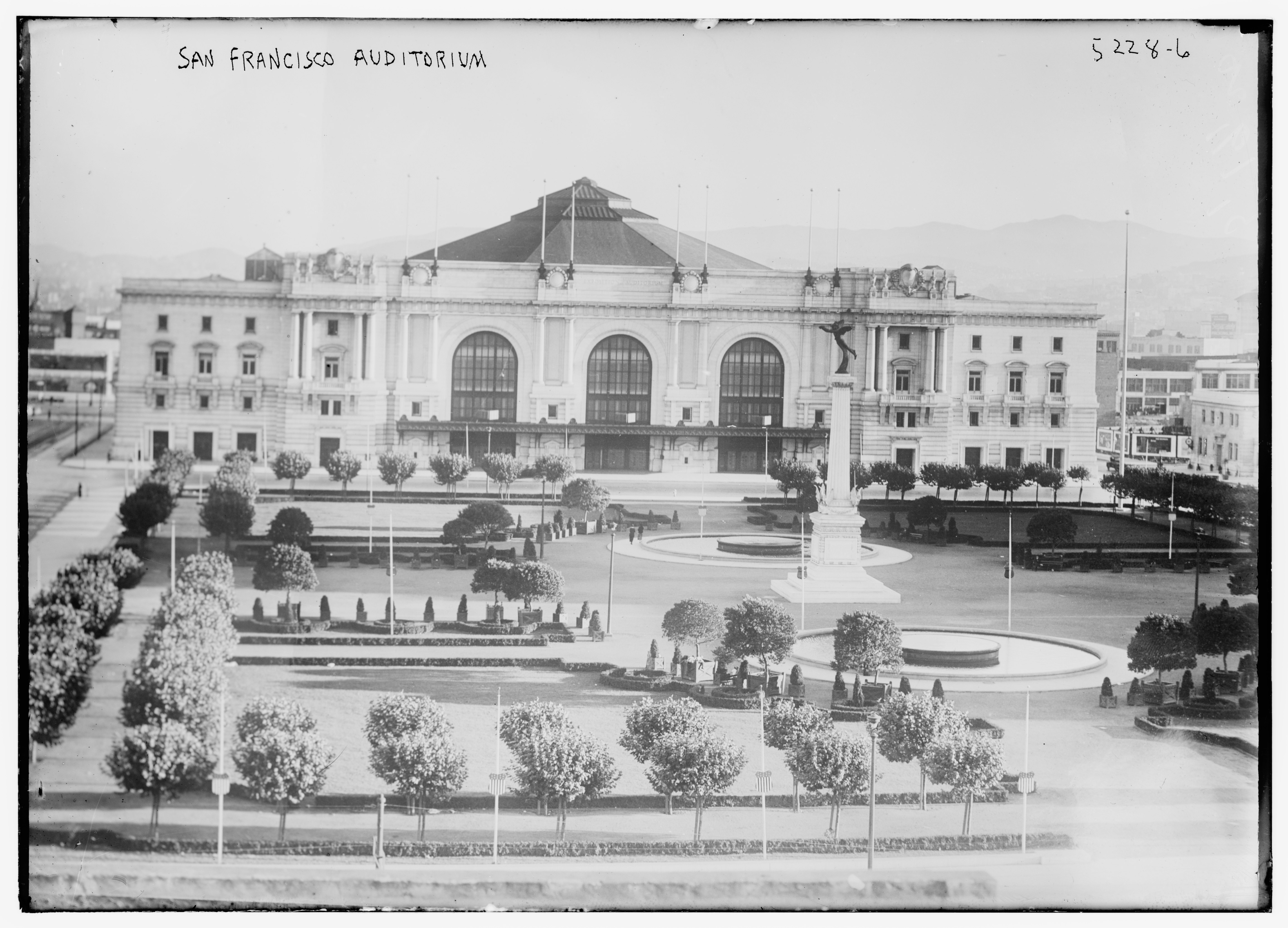
The San Francisco Auditorium was transformed into the "Peace Palace"

The International Conference of Women Workers to Promote Permanent Peace was held in San Francisco, California, July 4–7, 1915, at the Panama–Pacific International Exposition. It was held in the Civic Auditorium (now the Bill Graham Civic Auditorium), which was transformed into a Peace Palace. May Wright Sewall, by appointment of Charles C. Moore, chair of the exposition, organized the peace conference in the interests of women pacificists meeting to promote permanent peace.

== Preparations ==
On June 24, 1914, President Moore of the exposition issued a commission authorizing Sewall to organize a Conference of International Women Workers to devise means for generating throughout the world the spirit of Co-operative Internationalism. The questions to be considered at the conference were: "What can women do toward a re-organization of Society on a basis of safety which shall prevent its members from being offered on the altar of War, either as victims or as instruments?"

Sewall's first acquaintance with the "Peace Palace" was made a few days after her first visit to the exposition site. Said she, "For beauty of architecture, for enchantment of coloring, for fascination of environment, for a certain jaunty air of good fellowship, and for a spirit of cooperative aspiration, the Panama-Pacific International Exposition surpasses an exposition I have ever seen, and I have seen many."

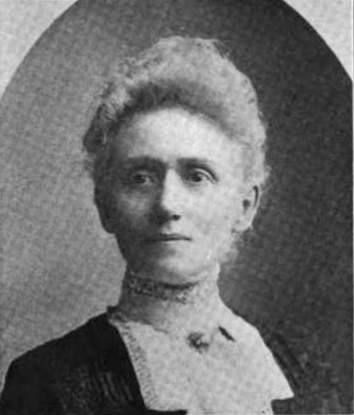
Mrs. J. W. Orr

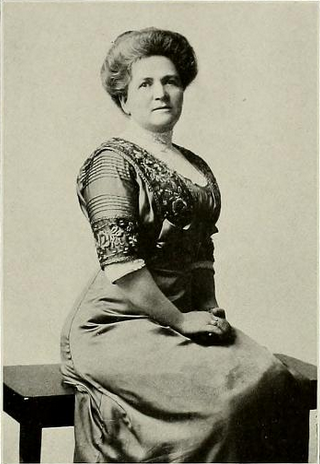
Mrs. A. P. Black

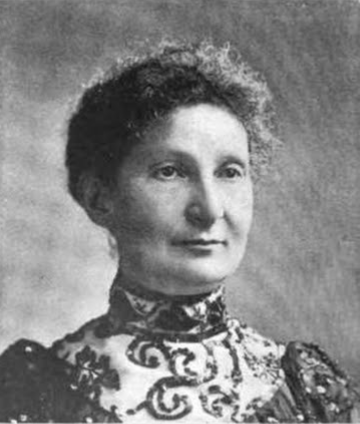
Mrs. I. Lowenberg

Sewall established headquarters at 1401 Hyde Street, San Francisco, and from there directed the far-reaching work. She worked in conjunction with the Director of Congresses, James Adam Barr. The Local Section of Sewall's Home Advisory Board was made up of women of the Pacific Coast. Those enlisted included Phoebe Hearst, Mrs. David Starr Jordan, Mary Wood Swift, Mrs. James Rolph Jr., Mrs. Frank K. Mott, Mrs. Alexander F. Morrison, Mrs. J. W. Orr, Mrs. A. P. Black, Mrs. I. Lowenberg, Ethel Moore, Mrs. Frank C. Havens, and Mary Connors. All the women who were associated in peace work abroad in the 25 years preceding the conference were invited to a place on the Foreign Advisory Board. Among them were Emmeline Pethick-Lawrence and Ethel Snowden of England, and Rosika Schwimmer of Hungary. The Organizing Committee which was responsible for the conference's groundwork consisted only of presidents of women's international organizations which had central bureaus in the U.S. and a number of distinguished women journalists. The women of California, who were politically free, were the hostesses.

The conference's objective was "To Make This The Last War" and its slogan was "In Time of War Prepare for Peace and in Time of Peace Work to Maintain Peace".

== The conference ==
The conference attracted 500 delegates from the U.S. and eleven other countries, especially the neutral countries of World War I. Those then gathered together from different countries were fired by the need for humanity to awaken to a keener realization of the dangers threatening to end modern civilization. Organized on a democratic basis, no attempt was made to fetter the free speech of her view by a woman invited to attend its sessions, or by anyone asked to contribute to its success with suggestions and advice.

== Legacy ==
The official report of the International Conference of Women Workers to Promote Permanent Peace, entitled: Women, World War and Permanent Peace, May Wright Sewall, editor, which was published in San Francisco at the close of 1915, forms a notable contribution to the literature of peace.

Some of the conference's collected records are held in the Swarthmore College Peace Collection. Other records, including correspondence, are held by Ramapo College's Jane Addams Digital Edition.
