= Phan Thị Vàng Anh =

Vietnamese poet and short-story writer (born 1968)

Phan Thị Vàng Anh (another pen name Thảo Hảo; born 18 August 1968) is a Vietnamese poet and short-story writer. She was one of the Vietnamese writers that emerged from post-Vietnam War literature.

== Early life ==
Anh was born in 1968 in Hanoi, Vietnam. Her father and mother were, respectively, Chế Lan Viên, a poet who composed on philosophical questions dealing with the occult and life, and Vũ Thị Thường, a novelist. Vang-Anh's inspirations mostly came from her parents' literary influences.

== Themes ==
The themes that Anh covers in her works are about family, life, friendship, love, and coming of age, about which she writes in a simple style. Her works are read by different generations of readers due to the relatable characters written in her stories.

== Selected works ==
- Truyện trẻ con (children's story) (9/1988)
- Hoa muộn (Late Flowers) (1993)
- Khi người ta trẻ (When We Are Young) (1994)
- Pantomime (1994)
- Mưa rơi (Rain) (1994)
- Hội chợ (Market Days) (1995)
