= Philomath Club =

American literary club

- Named after: derived from the Greek (Lover of Learning)
- Formation: March 1894
- Founder: Mrs. I. Lowenberg
- Founded at: San Francisco, California, U.S.
- Type: Nonprofit
- Purpose: to promote the general culture of its members
- Fields: literary association
- Affiliations: California State Federation of Women's Clubs
- Remarks: slogan, Onward and Forward!

Philomath Club was an American literary club of Jewish women. It was established in San Francisco, California in March 1894, its slogan being: Onward and Forward! Mrs. I. Lowenberg conceived the idea of forming a "Jewish Women's Literary Club". Philomath had the distinction of being the first club in the world composed of Jewish women with a regularly adopted constitution.

== Establishment ==
Before going to the World's Columbian Exposition (Chicago, 1893), Lowenberg was imbued with the idea that there were many intellectual Jewish women in San Francisco who lacked the opportunity of development by organization, which was a potent factor in commercial and educational as well as club life. So when she returned from the exposition, with impressions intensified, she asked Mrs. A. S. Bettelheim to assist in naming some women who would form and foster an organization to be conservative, but progressive, to promote the general culture of its members through the discussion of educational, moral and social topics and lectures by eminent men and women of the day. Mrs. William Haas became deeply interested in such an organization and worked zealously for its success with the result that the Philomath Club was launched with the following charter members: Mrs. I. Lowenberg, Mrs. Helen Hecht, Mrs. A. S. Bettelheim, Mrs. William Haas, Mrs. J. H. Neustadter, Mrs. Charles L. Ackerman, Mrs. Moses Heller, Mrs. S. Nickelsburg, Mrs. H. Ansbacher Meyers. A call was issued by the charter members and some seventy or eighty ladies responded and became members. (Note: According to Sheidman (1925), the club began with a membership of 25.)

The club name, Philomath, is derived from the Greek (Lover of Learning). Its object was "to encourage literary and educational pursuits and to promote civic ideals." A broad and comprehensive platform when established. The activities at the inception were purely literary, interspersed with music.

== 20th-century ==
=== Federation ===
The records were lost in the 1906 San Francisco earthquake. The Mesdames Neustadter allowed Philomath the use of their dance hall in their home in Van Ness Avenue, where for some months, meetings were held in happy surroundings. In 1907, the Philomath Club became federated, having come into the California State Federation of Women's Clubs.

=== 1910s ===
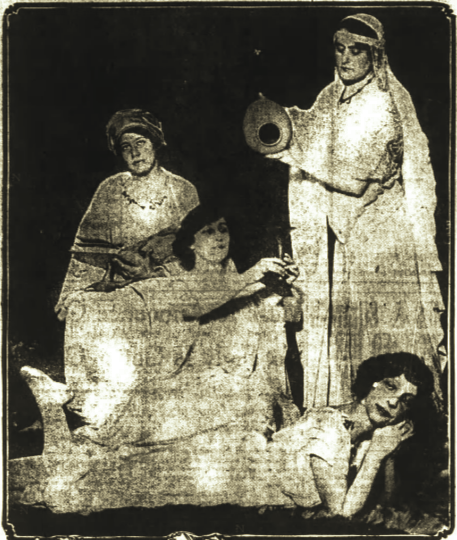
Performance at the Philomath Club (March 1913)

In March, 1914, Philomath celebrated its twentieth anniversary with a dinner dance. In 1916, Philomath had 175 members; it was limited and had a waiting list.

World War I precipitated a call for change and the Red Cross Auxiliary was organized. Materials were supplied by the club, with members meeting three days weekly to make garments, surgical dressings, and bandages. Over 60,000 surgical dressings and bandages, and over 2,000 garments were Philomath's contribution to the war effort.

During the 1918 influenza epidemic, 1,000 packages of cooked food were sent to the needy. No appeal from Europe or Asia went unheeded.

Americanization work was a great factor for Philomath activity through all the administrations. The club adopted a number of French orphans. To cultural aims, Philomath contributed carefully planned programs; momentary aid to its library fund, to the Public Educational Society, and to many other worthy projects, always with the purpose and the principles of Philomath primarily behind the work. The Mary Prag Scholarship, the Roosevelt Memorial Fund, the Alice Fredericks Memorial Fund, Korean Relief, the Palestinian Supply Committee, the Edith Cavell and Marie de Page Hospital of Belgium, the Near East Relief, Palestinian Restoration Fund, the International Longfellow Society, received the support of Philomath Club. Six members volunteered for service on Dr. Anne Nicholson's Americanization Court Committee. Its bi-monthly programs touched on topics of live interest, music, drama, and politics. Philomath was a member of The Recreation League and was interested in movements of social and communal concern.

=== 1920s ===
In 1920, meetings of the Philomath Club were held in the Century Clubhouse on Franklin Street, on the second and fourth Mondays of each month. Mrs. Richard Mewman, president, was supported by the following: Mrs. I Prager, first vice president; Mrs. Oscar Hoffman, second vice president; Mrs. S. F. Haber, recording secretary; Mrs. Maurice Greenberg, business secretary; Miss Sarita Henderson, corresponding secretary; Miss Hattie Sheidman, treasurer. The directors of Philomath Club were: Miss Rachel Abel, Mrs. Simon Anspacher, Mrs. J. J. Eppinger, and Mrs. Herbert Clayburgh.

The keynote during the early 1920s was service. Philomath went back to a quieter field of activity during the readjustment period. The future of this work was the high school scholarship, given to a worthy student. The first recipient of Philomath Club's eighth-grade scholarship became self-supporting and since then other girls were put through high school.

New officers of the Philomath Club elected at the annual meeting, May 1922, following the administration of Mrs. Richard Newman and her executive staff included the following: Mrs. Charles Schlesinger, president; Mrs. William L. Hyman, first vice-president; Mrs. Samuel Hirschfelder, second vice-president; Mrs. Joseph I. Cahen, business secretary; Miss Anita Levy, recording secretary; Mrs. Max Blumlein, corresponding secretary; and Mrs. Benjamin Arnhold, Mrs. Oscar Hoffman, Mrs. Julius Feigenbaum, Mrs. H. G. W. Dinkelspiel, directors; and Mrs. Julius Kahn, Mrs. Caspar Rosenheim, and Miss Rebecca Godchaux, honorary members.

By 1925, Philomatch Club numbered 175, the membership being a limited one. Meetings were held every Monday from September to May. These meetings were devoted to threefold activities — art, dramatics, and book reviews. The art and dramatic sections were presided over by prominent professors from the universities who gave instructive interpretations of the reading of modern plays. The book review section leader gave illuminating reviews of the books of the day. Once a month, there was an open meeting, and members were privileged to invite guests.

The officers of Philomath for 1925–26 were: Mrs. William L. Hyman, president; Mrs. Charles De Young Elkus, first vice-president; Mrs. Alfred Raas, second vice-president; Miss Lillian Phillips, recording secretary; Miss Hattie Sheidman, treasurer; Mrs. Samuel L. Samter, business secretary; Mrs. Julius Wolf, corresponding secretary. The Directors were: Mrs. Emil Wangenheim, Mrs. Moses Heller, and Mrs. Joseph L.C. Goldsmith.

=== Later years ===
The Philomath Club held its first meeting of 1941 at the St. Francis Hotel on September 11. That year's elected officers included: Mrs. John J. Sampson, president; Mrs. Robert H. Willard, business secretary, and Mrs. Henry L. Baer, treasurer.

Its 66th anniversary was marked in March 1960 at a luncheon at the Mark Hopkins Hotel.
