= Anna F. Weaver =

American educator (1874–1951)

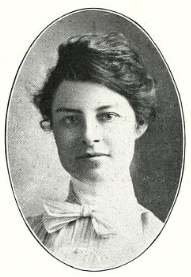
- Born: Anna Francis Weaver; 1874; Illinois, US
- Died: December 27, 1951 (aged 76–77); Brookline, Massachusetts, US
- Education: A.B., Stanford University 1897 A.M., Stanford University 1898
- Occupations: Educator, teacher, professor

Anna Francis Weaver (1874 – December 27, 1951) was an American educator who taught students in several educational institutions in Indianapolis, Indiana in the early 1900s.

== Family ==
Weaver was born in Illinois in 1874. Her parents were Robert M. Weaver and Angeline D. (Shultz) Weaver. She had two older half-brothers, Harrison "Harry" and John M. Weaver, a brother, Robert, and sisters, Ella Jane and May Alice. In 1880, she lived with her grandmother, mother, brother, and two sisters in Logansport, Indiana. In 1901, the three sisters were all teaching in Logansport. None of the three sisters married; in 1910, they lived at 635 North Pennsylvania St in Indianapolis, where both Ella and May were teaching at the Girls' Classical School, where Anna was the principal.

== Education ==
Weaver attended the private Girls' Classical School in Indianapolis, Indiana. She then earned bachelor's (Latin, 1897) & master's (Classical Philology, 1898) degrees at Stanford University. Weaver was a student at the University of Leipzig & Zurich (1899–1901).

== Career ==
Weaver was a Fellow and Instructor at Stanford (1901), teacher (1901–1903) and Principal at a private school in Logansport, Indiana (1903–1906), and Joint Principal of the Girls' Classical School in Indianapolis with May Wright Sewall (1906–1910). Anna closed the school in 1910 after managing it for a few years after Sewall retired.

Weaver was an instructor at Butler University in Irvington, Indianapolis, Indiana, from 1910 to 1927.

In 1914, she traveled to Greece for the summer. In 1918, she was appointed head of the Latin Dept. at the Brooks School for Boys (later Park Tudor) in Indianapolis. In 1925, she was granted a year's leave of absence from Butler for study abroad in England and Athens, Greece. She returned to Butler, as planned in 1926, but her contract was terminated in 1927.

In 1928, she sued Butler University over her 1927 dismissal. She alleged she was out of employment for the year since other faculties had already been filled. Her Butler salary had been $2,500 per year. The Marion County Circuit Court granted her the damages; the Appellate Court reversed the decision. Then, the Indiana Supreme Court refused to transfer the case to its jurisdiction (1933).

== Later life ==
In 1934, Weaver returned to Indianapolis after being in Europe for almost five years. Sometime between 1935 & 1940, she moved to Boston, Massachusetts. She lived at 75 Sewall Ave in Brookline, Massachusetts, at the time of her death in 1951.
