= R. A. H. Goodyear =

English author

Robert Arthur Hanson (R.A.H.) Goodyear (1877 – 24 November 1948) was an English author of children's stories, primarily in a boys' school setting.

Born in Barnsley in Yorkshire, Goodyear attended Holgate School, Barnsley.

At the age of only seventeen he wrote a serial called "The Football Rivals" and sent it to Robert Hamilton Edwards, who had just successfully launched The Boy's Friend periodical. Edwards was impressed and the story made its debut in the first Christmas number of the half penny Boy's Friend (number 47) in 1895.

Shortly afterwards he sent some stories to Alfred Barratt (better known as the novelist R Andom) who was then Editor of Henderson's Nugget Library. Barratt liked them and published them (including number 82 entitled The School's Dishonour).

From these two auspicious beginnings, Goodyear went on to write many more stories and serials for both editors and also for the "Athletic News" (and other sporting papers, for which he wrote chiefly on football"), "Tit-Bits", "Cassell's Saturday Journal" and "Pearson's Weekly".

After some years of writing for the popular weeklies and various libraries he turned his attention to writing hard-cover boys school stories, which became very successful as prizes and gifts. In all he wrote over 50 such novels between 1920 and 1938 (see bibliography below).

He also produced guides for writers.

In private life one of his favourite pastimes was producing village plays, some of which he also wrote.

He was a keen old boys' book collector and contributed many articles to the Story Paper Collector, the Collectors' Digest (later amalgamated as the Story Paper Collectors' Digest) and Collectors' Miscellany.

He died in November 1948 at his home in Scarborough, North Yorkshire.

His home was named "Wintergleam" which was also the name of the school in his 1928 novel With Wat at Wintergleam.

== Bibliography ==
- Forge of Foxenby (1920)
- The Boys of Castle Cliff School (1921)
- The Boys of Tudorville (1921)
- Luckless Leo's Schooldays (1921)
- Tom and Tim at School (1921)
- Two Terms at Linglands (1921)
- The White House Boys (1921)
- The Four Schools (1922)
- The Greenway Heathens (1922) subsequently republished as One of the Best (1930)
- Topsy-Turvey Academy (1922)
- The Worst Boy in Town (1922)
- His Brother at St Concord's (1922)
- The Captain and the Kings (1923)
- Jack O' Langsett: A Public School Story (1923)
- The Life of the School (1923)
- Tom at Tollbar School (1923)
- Battle Royal School (1924)
- The Sporting Fifth at Ripley's (1924)
- Young Rockwood at School (1924)
- The Fifth Form at Beck House (1925)
- Boys of the Valley School (1925)
- The School's Best Man (1925)
- Three Joskins at St Jude's (1925)
- The Boys of Ringing Rock (1925)
- The Hope of His House (1926)
- Blake of the Modern Fifth (1926)
- Boys of the Mystery School (1926)
- The New Boy at Baxtergate (1926)
- The Fellows of Ten Trees School (1927)
- Up Against The School (1927)
- Strickland of the Sixth (1928)
- The Grammar School Hotspurs (1928)
- The Luck of the Lower Fifth (1928)
- With Wat at Wintergleam (1928)
- Rival Schools at Schooner Bay (1928)
- The Hardy Brockdale Boys (1929)
- Too Big for the Fifth (1929)
- Clare of Glen House (1929)
- Tringle of Harlech (1930)
- All Out for the School (1930)
- School Before All (1931)
- Something Like A Chum (1932)
- Rivals at St John's (1933)
- The Old Golds : A Romance of Football (1934)
- The Isle of Sheer Delight (1935)
- The Captain of Glendale (1935)
- Pulling Templestone Together (1936)
- Tudorvale Colours (1936)
- The School's Airmen (1936)
- The Broom And Heather Boys : A Public School Story (1937)
- Fenshaven Finds Its Feet : A Public School Story (1938)
- Parry Wins Through (1938)
