= Chế Lan Viên =

Vietnamese poet (1920–1989)

- Born: Phan Ngọc Hoan; October 20, 1920; Quảng Trị, French Indochina
- Died: June 19, 1989 (aged 68); Ho Chi Minh City, Vietnam
- Occupations: Poet, writer
- Writing career
- Notable works: Điêu tàn, Ánh sáng và phù sa

Chế Lan Viên (October 20, 1920 – June 24, 1989) was a Vietnamese poet. He was born Phan Ngọc Hoan, in Đông Hà, in Central Vietnam. He grew up in Quy Nhơn further south, and started writing poetry at an early age. His first collection, published when he was seventeen, gained him notice as a poet of original, if morose, sensibilities. He participated in the events of the August Revolution of 1945, in the Quy Nhơn area. Afterwards, he wrote for a number of journals, including Quyết Thắng (Resolve to Win) in support of the Việt Minh's movement against French rule.

After the Geneva Agreements of 1954, Chế Lan Viên returned to Hà Nội, taking on responsibilities as a leading member of the Writers' Association of Viet Nam (Hội Nhà Văn Việt Nam).

After the fall of South Vietnam in 1975, Chế Lan Viên lived and worked in Hồ Chí Minh City (formerly Sài Gòn). A prolific writer, he remained active in the literary scene, producing poetry, essays, memoirs, and commentary and criticism until his death in 1989. He was married to the novelist, Vũ Thị Thường; their daughter, Phan Thi Vang-Anh, is a writer as well.

== Poetry ==
Chế Lan Viên was associated with the Bình Định Group of poets, whose other members were Quách Tấn, Hàn Mặc Tử, and Yến Lan. The preface to his first collection, Điêu Tàn, was also a statement of the aesthetics of the "Disordered" (Loạn), also known as "Mad" (Điên), school of poetry. The poems in that volume are marked by ghastly, even demonic, subjects and imagery. There are rumors Chế Lan Viên was ethnic Chàm by birth because the ruins referred to in the title are those of the extinct Chàm Kingdom. However, he identified as "Giao Chi" person, meaning he was ethnic Vietnamese. The poems are haunted by catastrophe, by death and killings, and by memories of a lost past.

Note: "Giao Chi" is not a Cham ethnic group. Giao Chi (Jiaozhi in Chinese) is the ancient name of northern Vietnam during the period of early Chinese domination of Vietnam. Che Lan Vien was born a Phan (Vietnamese) in Cam An Village, Cam Lo District, Quang Tri Province in 1920. He grew up in Quy Nhon (Binh Dinh Province) where there are many Cham ruins in the province, including the capital Do-Ban (Vijaya). Like many poets his time, Phan Ngoc Hoan decided to take up a pen name for his first published work. So, at the age of 17 Phan Ngoc Hoan, now known as Che Lan Vien ("Che" is a well-known Vietnamese surname of Cham ethnic origin) published Dieu Tan (Ruins) in 1937. Unlike Che Linh (Jamlen), who is Vietnamese of Cham ethnicity from Ninh Thuan Province, Che Lan Vien (Phan Ngoc Hoan) was not of ethnic Cham origin.

His poetry during the war period was highly journalistic and heavily colored with nationalist sentiments. After the war, his writings reflected a return to normalcy, remembering the past and commenting on the realities of everyday living.

== Bibliography ==
=== Poetry ===
- Điêu Tàn (Ruins) 1937
- Gửi Các Anh (To My Brothers) 1954
- Ánh Sáng và Phù Sa (Silt Sand and Light) 1960
- Hoa Ngày Thường – Chim Báo Bão (Ordinary Flowers – The Storm-Omening Bird) 1967
- Những bài thơ đánh giặc (Poems To Fight the Enemy) 1972
- Đối thoại mới (New Conversations) 1973
- Hoa Trước Lăng Người (Flowers Before a Monument) 1976
- Hái theo mùa (Picking According to the Season) 1977
- Hoa Trên đá (Flowers Above the Rocks) 1985
- Di Cảo (Posthumous works) I (1994) & II (1995)

=== Prose (partial) ===
- Vàng Sao (The Yellow Star) 1942
- Thăm Trung Quốc (Visit to China) 1963
- Những Ngày Nổi Giận (Days of Wrath) 1966
- Giờ của đô thành (City Hours) 1977
