= Makaiko Kheti =

1920 lost work by Krishna Lal Adhikari

- Author: Krishna Lal Adhikari
- Original title: Makaiko Kheti
- Working title: Makai Ko Kheti
- Language: Nepali
- Subject: Maize cultivation
- Set in: Kingdom of Nepal
- Publisher: Nepali Bhasha Prakashini Samiti
- Publication date: July 1920
- Publication place: Nepal

Makaiko Kheti (Nepali: मकैको खेती, lit. 'The Cultivation of Maize') is a 1920 lost literary work by Krishna Lal Adhikari (sometimes credited as Subba Krishna Lal Adhikari or Krishnalal Adhikari). Adhikari had been inspired to write a book about maize cultivation after reading an Indian book that a friend had given him. With permission from Nepali Bhasha Prakashini Samiti, the book was released in July 1920, with 1,000 copies being printed. Detractors accused the book of containing double entendres which purportedly attacked the Rana dynasty that had ruled over the Kingdom of Nepal since 1846. Adhikari was sentenced to nine years in prison, where he died.

== Background and writing ==
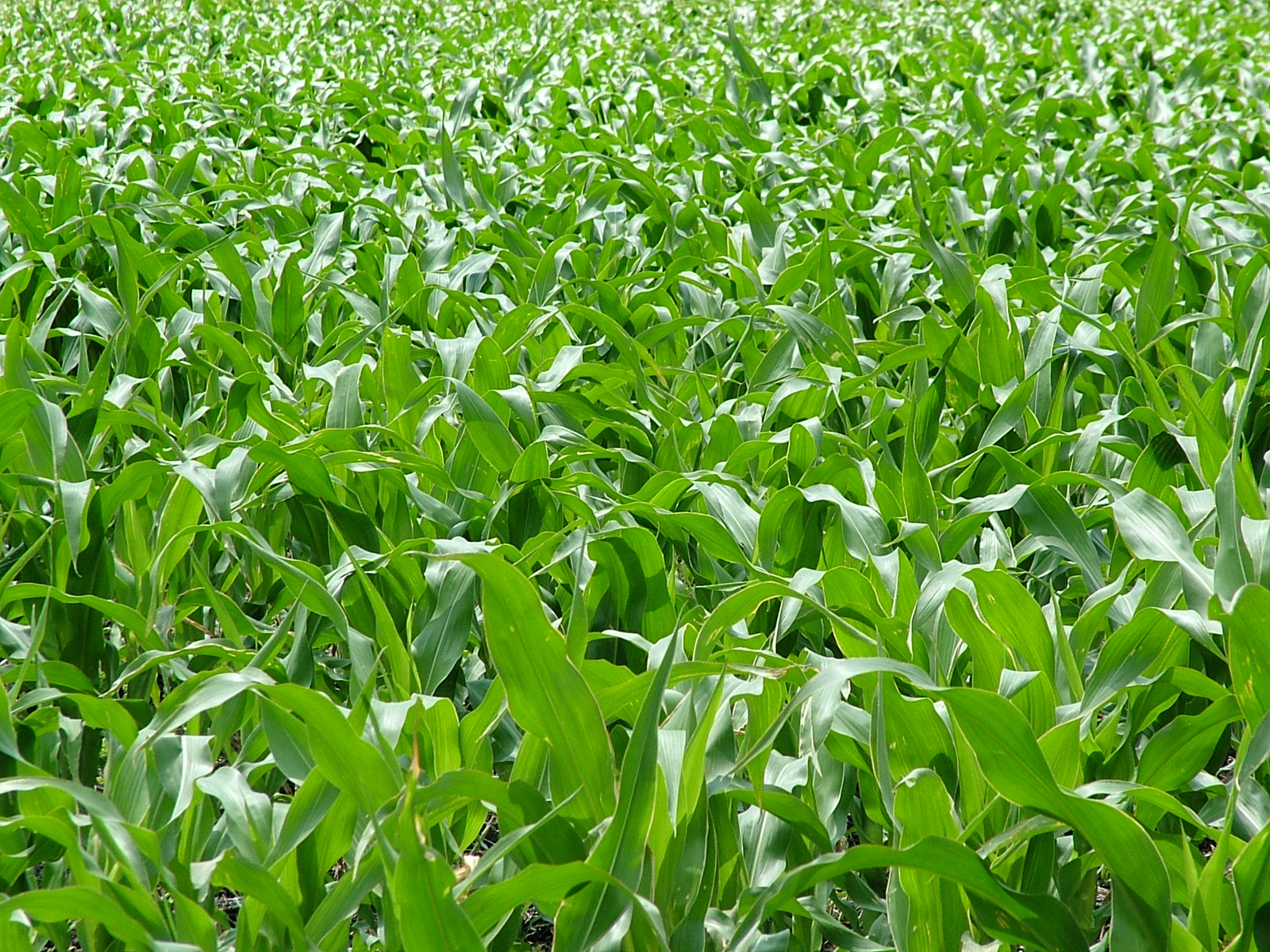
A field of maize

During the Rana rule in Nepal, government permission was required for anything to be published. According to the National Code of Nepal (1854) passed by Prime Minister Jung Bahadur Rana, the book had to be given to the Nepali Bhasha Prakashini Samiti (Samiti) for review and seeking permission for publication. Anyone who was caught publishing or printing a document without permission was fined 50 Nepalese rupees; if the work contained anything that was deemed offensive to the Rana dynasty, all of the copies were to be seized by the Samiti and usually destroyed.

Krishna Lal Adhikari had received permission from the Samiti prior to the book's release. He was working for the Rana government; reportedly he had asked Kaiser Shumsher Jang Bahadur Rana, son of Chandra Shumsher, who had given him the permission to publish the book. His friend had given him an Indian book about maize cultivation which inspired Adhikari to write a book about farming. It is unknown if the book was intended to be an agricultural manual or a political satire.

== Contents ==
In the book, Adhikari detailed how to increase yield and protect the crop from termites; however, Makaiko Kheti contained many double entendres. At the time, the Rana dynasty had been ruling over the Kingdom of Nepal since 1846 and was censoring freedom of expression. The book included many metaphors that alluded to the Ranas. Some of the figures of speech included: "the red headed insects and black headed insects", "domestic and foreign dogs", "the devils entered since 1846", and "Chandrodaya is not as good as mother's milk to a child".

== Publication ==
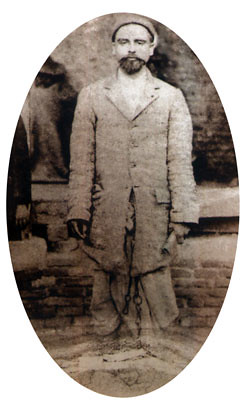
Krishna Lal Adhikari in prison

Makaiko Kheti, later known as Krishi Shikshvali, Prathambhag, Makai Ko Kheti, was released in July 1920. One thousand copies were printed, and upon release, it became popular throughout the Kingdom of Nepal.

Two pundits – Ramhari Adhikari and Bhojraj Kafle – reported to Prime Minister Chandra Shumsher Jang Bahadur Rana about the book, blaming the author for "mischievous expressions to treason". Chandra reportedly said that Krishna Lal Adhikari "made a symbolic attack" on him because the book contained "a comparative analysis of the utility of a dog of an English breed and a native dog". This analysis was intended to satirize the linguistic anglicisation of the Ranas by saying that the local dog fights to protect the corn from thieves, while the English dog looks better but it doesn't protect the crop. Chandra Shumsher was a pro-British politician who had built a bond between foreigners. The "red and black insects" offended Chandra Shumsher Jang Bahadur Rana and Bhim Shamsher Jang Bahadur Rana because they wore red and black topis, respectively.

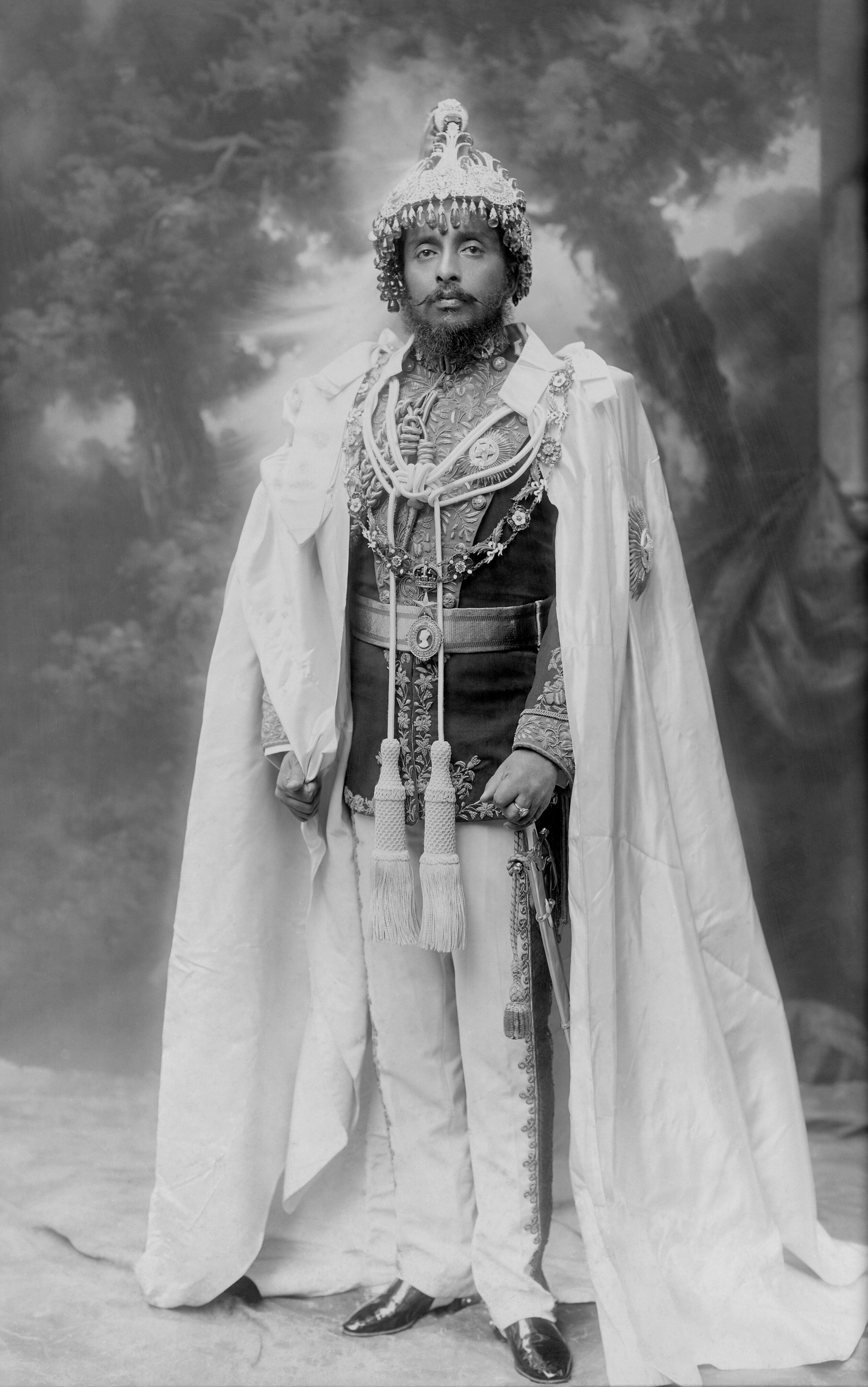
Chandra Shumsher Jang Bahadur Rana

On 2 August 1920, Adhikari was sentenced to nine years in prison; his sentence would be reduced to six years if he handed over all 1,000 copies of the book to the government. Adhikari tried to return all the copies but one had gone missing and he was unable to locate it. All of the 999 copies were burnt. No surviving copies of the book have been found.

No court documents survive to indicate how Adhikari defended himself or if he admitted to committing treason. Upon his arrest, two pundits were awarded "shawls of honour" and 1,000 Nepalese rupees. His friends were also punished and fined as his accomplices and discharged from their government jobs. Somenath Sigdel was fined 50 Nepalese rupees for correcting the metaphors in the book. On 9 December 1923, Adhikari died of tuberculosis whilst in prison. Adhikari's arrest and death later became known as the "Makai Parva" (Maize Incident).

Author Ganesh Bhandari wrote that Bhojraj Kafle, who was also working for the Rana government, might have been the real author of the book. Kafle might have put the blame on Adhikari soon after the controversy. Following the controversy, all authors were frightened of the word "maize", and the incident discouraged other authors from writing negatively about the Ranas. In 1920, the book was reprinted without the references to the Rana dynasty, under a new title, Krishi Shikshvali.

== Adaptations and legacy ==
Makai Ko Arkai Kheti (English: A Different Cultivation of Maize) is a dark comedy play based on the "Makai Parva". The play was designed and directed by Bimal Subedi and written by Sanjeev Uprety. The play was first performed in 2015 at the Theatre Village, Kathmandu. It opens with a writer who writes a book named Makai Ko Arkai Kheti and questions if an author can be jailed for his work, and can he edit his published work.

The play received positive critical reviews. Timothy Aryal of The Kathmandu Post called it "compelling and genuine" theatre work. Sharada Adhikari, writing for The Himalayan Times, chided the actors for forgetting their lines from the script but praised the lead actor for realistically playing an author with a mental illness.

AD Ramadi published a book to make the Nepali people aware of the event. Apparently, it is similar to Makaiko Kheti but it does not include the metaphors from the original copy. Makaiko Kheti is regarded as one of the first reactions to the autocracy system. Professor Mahendra Lawoti cited the book as an example of "non-political party oriented rebellions".

KP Sharma Oli, the Prime Minister of Nepal, recognized Krishna Lal Adhikari as one of the martyrs who helped end the authoritarian government. Nepali magazine SpotlightNepal claimed that Makaiko Kheti is still remembered for being the book about foreshadowing socio-political change.

== See also ==
- Censorship in Nepal
