= Mrs. I. Lowenberg =

American author and clubwoman (1845–1924)

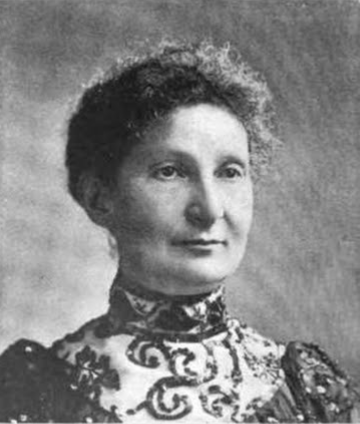
- (1903)
- Born: Bettie Lilienfeld; December 11, 1845; Prairie Bluff, Alabama, U.S.
- Died: December 30/31 1924; San Francisco, California, U.S.
- Occupation: author; clubwoman; reformer; socialite
- Genre: novels
- Subject: social reform
- Notable works: The Voices
- Spouse: Isidore Lowenberg (m. 1862; died 1919)
- Children: 2

Mrs. I. Lowenberg (née, Bettie Lilienfeld; December 11, 1845 – December 1924) was an American author, clubwoman, reformer, and socialite. Born in Alabama and educated in Missouri, she removed to San Francisco, California in 1860 and spent the rest of her life there. Lowenberg was the founder of San Francisco's Philomath Club, the first club in the world composed of Jewish women with a regularly adopted constitution. Her essays focused on various topics, especially on peace and arbitration. All three of her novels advocated for various types of reform.

== Early life and education ==
Bettie Lilienfeld was born December 11, 1845, in Prairie Bluff, Alabama, near Mobile. Her parents, William and Pauline (Levy) Lilienfeld, had immigrated from Prussia and Germany. Bettie's siblings were Jane, Anice, Emma, and Alfred.

She received her education at the convent of St. Vincent De Paul Catholic Church, Cape Girardeau, Missouri.

== Career ==
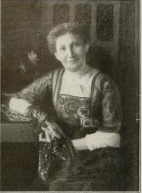
(1912)

Lowenberg was very active in women's club work. Subsequent to her visit to the World's Columbian Exposition (Chicago, 1893), where she attended the Parliament of the World's Religions's Jewish Women's Congress, Lowenberg established the Philomath Club, a Jewish women's literary association. She assisted in organizing the California State Federation of Women's Clubs (est. 1900) and was the first recording secretary and subsequently, president of the San Francisco district of that federation (1902). She served as president of the auxiliary board of the California Prison Commission; president, Pacific Coast Women's Press Association (1912–14); president, Laurel Hall Club; and president, San Francisco Maternity.

During the Spanish–American War, Lowenberg was the chair of the hospital commission of the American Red Cross, and a member of the executive committee of the ARC's San Francisco Chapter. She also served as distributing manager of the Manila Library Association, which organized for the comfort and accommodation of the army in the Philippines during the Spanish–American War.

Lowenberg was a member of the Local Section of the Home Advisory Board for the International Conference of Women Workers to Promote Permanent Peace (San Francisco, 1915). At the Panama–Pacific International Exposition (San Francisco, 1915), she was the First vice-president of the Authors' Congress, and Second vice-president of the exposition's Women's Board. During World War I, she served as Vice-regent of the California Preparedness Chapter of the Women's Naval Service, Inc. She was also a member of the State Commission on Marriage and Divorce, and the Board of National Arbitration and Peace Committee.

Lowenberg contributed short stories to various magazines. She also wrote speeches and plays, as well as essays on various topics, especially on peace and arbitration. The first of her three novels, The Irresistible Current (1908), was a plea for universal religion. A Nation's Crime (1910) served as a plea for uniform divorce laws.

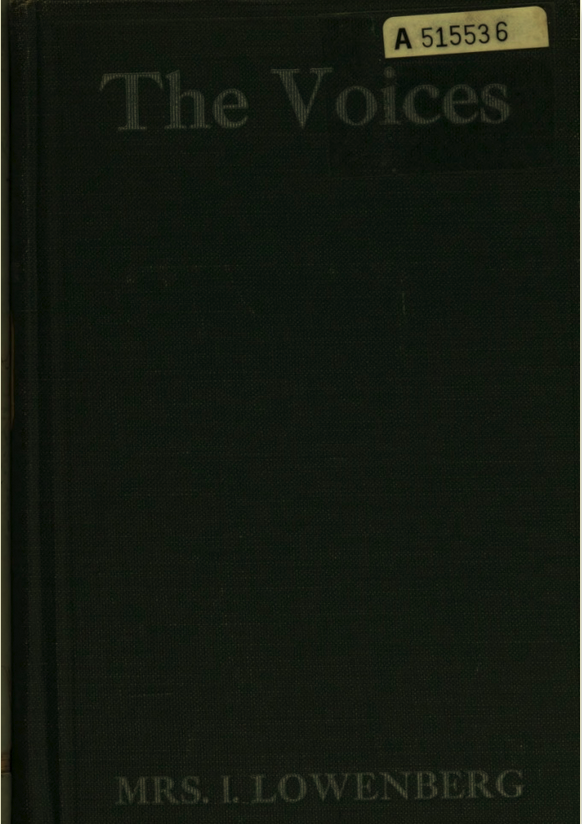
The voices (1920)

The last of her novels, The Voices (1920), contained much matter on the necessity of political reforms. Described as a novel for the 1920 United States presidential election, it revolves around a present-day Joan, not of Arc, but of one who listened to small voices within and became, in consequence, a leader in industrial and political happenings. A university graduate, the heroine secured a position in an iron and steel plant and took part in the questions which arose there between capital and labor. Romance and love-interest are also a part of the story which introduces personalities on both sides of the issues of industry. "Equal rights to all — unions and non-unions, organized and unorganized labor", declares the heroine, her intelligence stimulated by the mystic voices that speak to her from out the impalpable air.

Many years of her life were spent in the interests of others. Two endowment funds at the San Francisco Nursery for Homeless Children, and many gifts to women's clubs and other charities, both public and private, were among her philanthropy.

== Personal life ==
On October 12, 1862, she married Isidore Lowenberg (1835–1919) of Prussia, a prominent civic leader. The couple had two children, Albert (1864–1948) and Ruby (1872–1962).

Lowenberg was a member of San Francisco's Congregation Emanu-El. For a number of years, she served as vice-president of Temple Emanu-El kindergarten school, as well as vice-president of the local Council of Jewish Women.

She lived for several years at the city's Clift Hotel, where she died in December 1924. (Note: According to familysearch.org, Lowenberg died December 30, 1924, while according to her obituary in the Oakland Tribune, she died December 31.) Her scrapbooks and other materials are held by the Bancroft Library, at the University of California, Berkeley.

== Selected works ==
- The Irresistible Current (1908)
- A Nation's Crime (1910)
- The Voices (1920)
