= May Wright Sewall =

American suffragist (1844–1920)

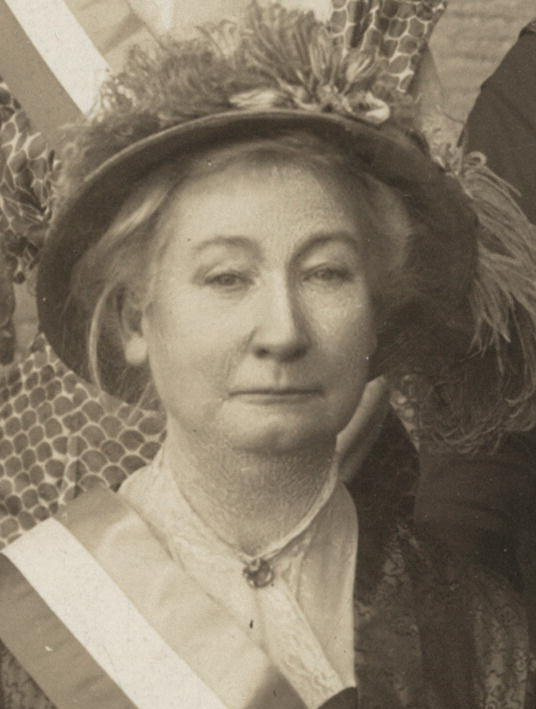
- Sewall in 1915
- Born: Mary Eliza Wright; May 27, 1844; Greenfield, Wisconsin, U.S.
- Died: July 22, 1920 (aged 76); Crown Hill Cemetery and Arboretum, Indianapolis, Indiana, U.S.
- Burial place: Section 13, Lot 24; 39.8196069°N 86.1759759°W
- Known for: Suffrage movement
- Spouses: Edwin W. Thompson (m. 1872; died 1875) Theodore Lovett Sewall (m. 1880; died 1895)

May Wright Sewall (née Mary Eliza Wright; May 27, 1844 – July 22, 1920) was an American reformer, who was known for her service to the causes of education, women's rights, and world peace. She was born in Greenfield, Milwaukee County, Wisconsin. Sewall served as chairman of the National Woman Suffrage Association's executive committee from 1882 to 1890, and was the organization's first recording secretary. She also served as president of the National Council of Women of the United States from 1897 to 1899, and president of the International Council of Women from 1899 to 1904. In addition, she helped organize the General Federation of Women's Clubs, and served as its first vice-president. Sewall was also an organizer of the World's Congress of Representative Women, which was held in conjunction with the World's Columbian Exposition in Chicago in 1893. U.S. President William McKinley appointed her as a U.S. representative of women to the Exposition Universelle (1900) in Paris.

Sewall became chairman of the National Council of Women's standing committee on peace and arbitration in 1904 and chaired and organized the International Conference of Women Workers to Promote Permanent Peace at the Panama–Pacific International Exposition in San Francisco in 1915. Sewall was also among the sixty delegates who joined Henry Ford's Peace Ship, an unofficial peace expedition aboard the Oscar II in an unsuccessful attempt to halt the war in Europe in 1915.

In addition to her work on women's rights Sewall was as an educator and lecturer, civic organizer, and spiritualist. In 1882 she and her second husband, Theodore Lovett Sewall, founded the Girls' Classical School in Indianapolis. The school was known for its rigorous college preparatory courses, physical education for women, and innovative adult education and domestic science programs. Sewall also helped to establish several civic organizations, most notably the Indianapolis Woman's Club, the Indianapolis Propylaeum, the Art Association of Indianapolis (later known as the Indianapolis Museum of Art), the Contemporary Club of Indianapolis, and the John Herron Art Institute, which became the Herron School of Art and Design at Indiana University – Purdue University Indianapolis (IUPUI). Although Sewall converted to spiritualism in 1897, she concealed her spiritualist activities from the public until the publication of her book, Neither Dead Nor Sleeping, two months prior to her death in 1920.

== Early life and education ==
Mary Eliza Wright was born on May 27, 1844, in Greenfield, Milwaukee County, Wisconsin. She was the second daughter and the youngest of four children born to Philander Montague Wright and his wife, Mary Weeks (Bracket) Wright. Mary Eliza's parents migrated from New England to Ohio, where they met and married, then moved to Wisconsin, where Philander, a former teacher, became a farmer. As a child Mary Eliza called herself May, a name she would retain throughout her life.

Philander Wright taught May at home, but she also attended public school in Wauwatosa, Wisconsin, and Bloomington, Wisconsin. He believed in equal opportunities among men and women, and encouraged his daughter to pursue higher education.

After teaching in Waukesha County, Wisconsin, from 1863 to 1865, May left the state to pursue studies at Northwestern Female College in Evanston, Illinois. The college was a respected school for women's education that was later absorbed into Northwestern University. May was awarded a laureate of science in 1866 and a Master of Arts degree in 1871.

== Personal life ==
May's first husband, Edwin W. Thompson, was an educator, as was her second husband, Theodore Lovett Sewall. She had no children from either marriage.

May and Edwin W. Thompson, a mathematics teacher from Paw Paw, Michigan, were married on March 2, 1872. The couple met while she was teaching in Plainwell, Michigan. In 1873 the Thompsons moved to Franklin, Indiana, where they continued their careers as educators and school administrators, but they resigned the following year to assume teaching positions at Indianapolis High School, later known as Shortridge High School. The Thompsons moved to Indianapolis in 1874 and lived in a neighborhood known as College Corner. They became members of the College Corner Club, joined the Indianapolis Woman Suffrage Society, which was formed in April 1873, and were members of a local Unitarian church. After contracting tuberculosis, Thompson went to a sanitarium in Asheville, North Carolina, to try to regain his health. May joined him at Asheville, where he died on August 19, 1875. May returned to Indianapolis after his death to resume teaching.

May married Theodore Lovett Sewall on October 31, 1880. The two met at a Unitarian church service in Indianapolis. Sewall was born in Ohio and raised in Wilmington, Delaware. He graduated from Harvard University in 1874, and opened the Indianapolis Classical School for boys on September 25, 1876. Their marriage was an equal partnership. Sewall's steady disposition balanced his "energetic" and "sometimes impractical wife. "

May and Theodore Sewall were liberal-minded progressives, whose home became a social center in the city. The couple hosted weekly gatherings of Indianapolis's intellectual community at their home to discuss the major topics of the day. They also welcomed numerous overnight guests, many of whom were well-known authors, artists, politicians, suffragists, and other social activists. Theodore, a supporter of women's rights, encouraged his wife's interests in social reform, specifically educational advancement for women and women's suffrage. He died from tuberculosis at their Indianapolis home on December 23, 1895.

== Early career ==
May began her teaching career in 1863, when she took a job at Waukesha County, Wisconsin, but left in 1865 to attend college in Evanston, Illinois. She returned to teaching after earning a college diploma in 1866, and took a job at Grant County, Wisconsin. She later moved to Michigan. In 1869 May became a high school teacher at Plainwell, Michigan, and subsequently its first woman principal.

In 1871 May moved to Franklin, Indiana, where she taught German at the local high school. She returned to Michigan in 1872 to marry to Edwin Thompson. The newlyweds moved to Franklin the following year. May became principal at Franklin's high school; Edwin was superintendent of schools. In 1874 the Thompsons resigned their positions at Franklin and moved to Indianapolis, where they became teachers at Indianapolis High School. May taught German and English literature; Edwin taught business classes.

After her marriage to Sewall in 1880, May resigned her position at Indianapolis High School. May taught German and literature at the Indianapolis Classical School for boys; Theodore was the school's principal.

== Educator ==
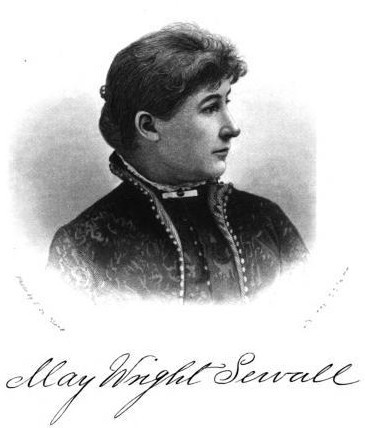

May spent more than three decades as an Indianapolis educator, twenty-five of them at the Girls' Classical School, which she founded with her second husband, Theodore. The school opened with forty-four students in September 1881. May served as the school's principal and taught literature. The Girls' Classical School became "one of the three leading girls' schools in Indianapolis."

The girls' school initially occupied a building on the southeast corner of Pennsylvania and St. Joseph streets. In 1884 it expanded to new facilities in a three-story brick building at 426 North Pennsylvania Street. In 1886, a year after Theodore's death, Sewall leased a double brick building at 343 and 345 North Pennsylvania to serve as a school residence for students who lived outside the city.

The school's curriculum did not offer the traditional courses for girls at the time, such as art or music. Instead, its college preparatory courses included classical studies, modern languages, and science. The school's academic courses were based on Harvard's entrance requirements for women, which included admission requirements for Smith, Vassar, and Wellesley, among other colleges. The girls' school also offered a course of study for women who did not plan to enroll in college.

In addition to academic classes, Sewall introduced dress reform and physical education for young women, which was not typical for a time when corsets, bustles, and petticoats were the norm. Sewall required students to wear shoes with low and broad heels. She also urged, but did not require, parents to provide students with simple dress that consisted of a "kilt skirt and loose waist with a sash" to allow for more freedom of movement.

After 1885, when Sewall became the sole principal of the school, she added innovative programs such as adult education and courses in domestic science (later known as home economics), which included classes in physics, chemistry, and cooking. These courses were among the first of their kind to be offered in Indiana or the nation.

By 1900 the Girls' Classical School was having financial problems as rival private schools were established in the city and public high schools became more common in Indiana. Sewall's more progressive ideas may also have led to the drop in enrollment.

The Sewalls operated the school together until Theodore's death in 1885. May continued to run the school until her retirement in 1907. In 1905 she partnered with Anna F. Weaver, a former student and a graduate of Stanford University, to jointly operate the school. In 1907 Sewall announced her retirement, ending her twenty-five year career at the school. Sewall sold the school's main building for $20,500. Weaver continued to run the Girls' Classical School from the double brick building they used as a school residence. Weaver permanently closed the school in 1910.

Sewall had no immediate plans after her retirement. In 1907 she donated items from her Indianapolis home to local organizations and left the city to deliver a public lecture at Eliot, Maine, and continued her work in the women's movement.

== Civic organizer ==
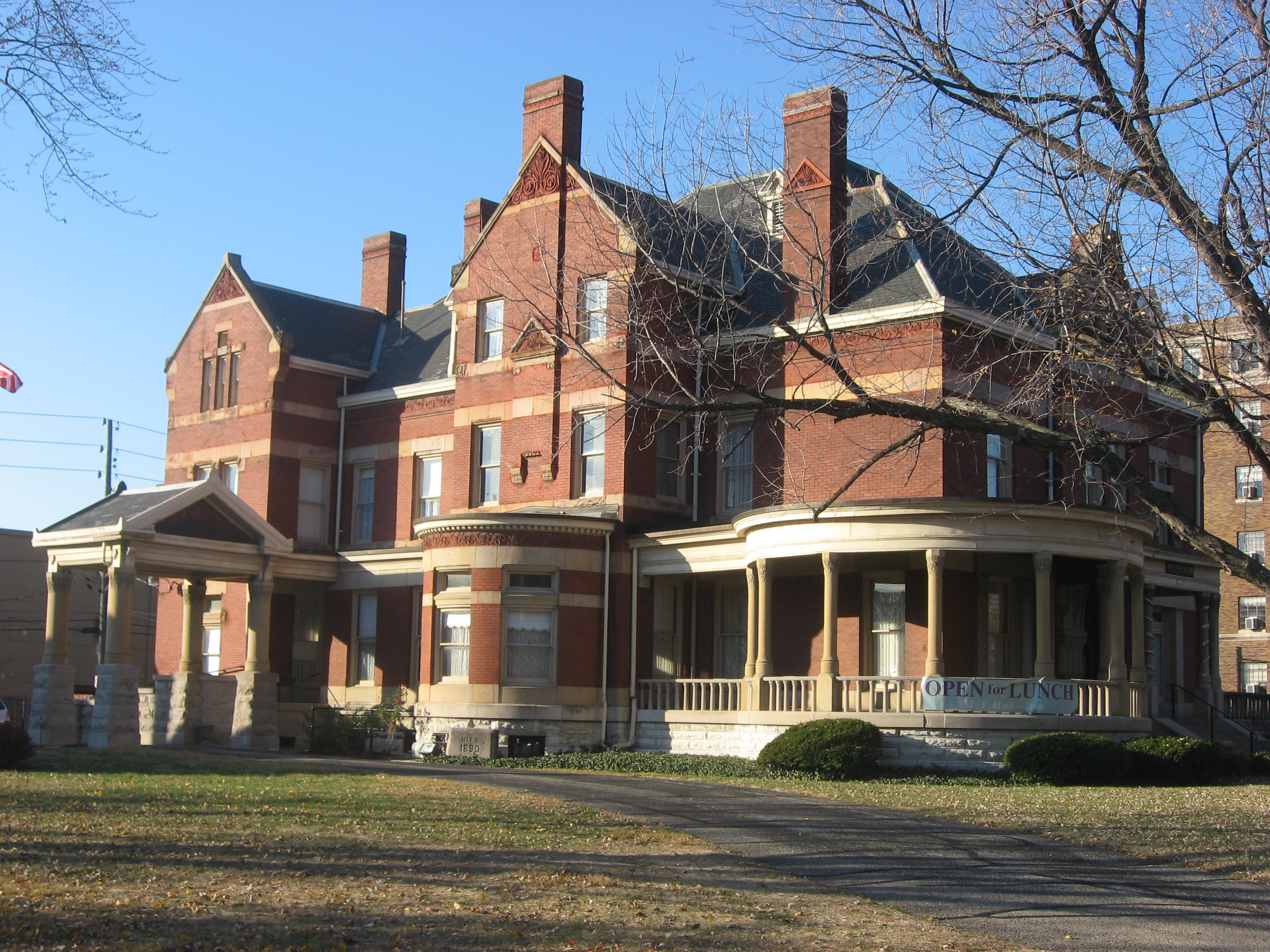
The Propylaeum, where Sewall held many events.

While a resident of Indianapolis Sewall was known for her active involvement in numerous civic and cultural organizations. Sewall's most significant civic work included founding the Indianapolis Woman's Club, the Indianapolis Propylaeum, the Art Association of Indianapolis, later known as the Indianapolis Museum of Art, and its affiliated art school, the John Herron Art Institute, which later became the Herron School of Art and Design at Indiana University – Purdue University Indianapolis (IUPUI). Many praised her work, but others criticized her as being "too dominant." Sewall thought that people "misunderstood her."

=== Indianapolis Woman’s Club ===
Sewall was among the small group of women who founded the Indianapolis Woman's Club, whose first meeting was held on February 18, 1875. The club was organized to further the "mental and social culture" of its members. Although it was not the first, the Indianapolis Woman's Club is the longest running of its kind in the state. Eliza Hendricks, wife of Indiana governor Thomas A. Hendricks, was the club's first president. Sewall became chair of its executive committee. Formed at a time when most Indianapolis residents opposed a woman's role outside the home, the club encouraged "a liberal interchange of thoughts. " The club's activities also helped train future leaders in civic affairs and in the national effort to secure voting rights for women.

=== Indianapolis Propylaeum ===
In 1888 Sewall encouraged the Indianapolis Woman's Club to consider erecting a building to serve as a meeting place for the club as well as other literary, artistic, and social organizations in the city. The effort led to establishing the Indianapolis Propylaeum, named after the Greek word propylaion, meaning gateway to higher culture.

The Propylaeum incorporated on June 6, 1888, as a stock company of Indianapolis women. Its initial $15,000 in stock, offered exclusively to women at $25 per share, helped fund construction of their first building at 17 East North Street, between Meridian and Pennsylvania streets. Sewall was elected president of the corporation, a position she retained until 1907, when she resigned and left Indianapolis. In June 1923, three years after Sewall's death, the City of Indianapolis acquired the Propylaeum's first building as a site for a new war memorial, and the organization erected a new building at 14th and Delaware streets.

=== Art Association of Indianapolis ===
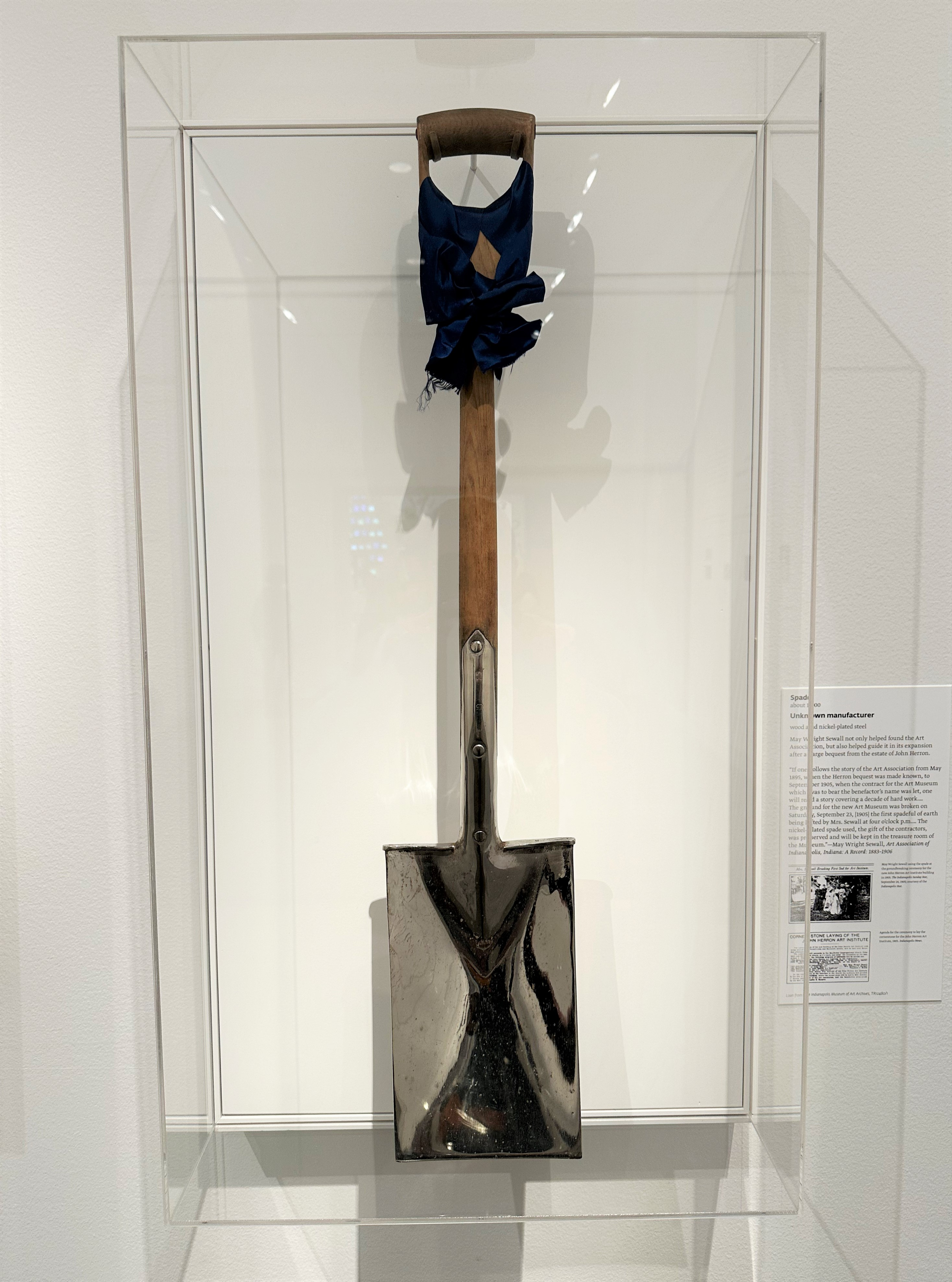
Sewall helped found the Art Association in 1883. In 1905, she used this spade to break ground on the John Herron Art Institute's Museum of Art.

In 1883 Sewall convened the initial meeting to organize the Art Association of Indianapolis, forerunner to the Indianapolis Museum of Art. She was a charter member of the group, which formally incorporated in October 1883. Sewall also helped found its affiliated art school, which became known as the John Herron Art Institute. Sewall served as the art association's first recording secretary, and as its president from 1893 to 1898. The Art Association acquired the Tinker House property at 16th and Pennsylvania streets, where their art school opened in March 1902. Sewall also attended the groundbreaking for the Art Association's new museum and art school, whose cornerstone was laid on November 25, 1905.

=== Other civic affiliations ===
May and Theodore Sewall organized and were charter members of Indianapolis's Contemporary Club, which was established in their home in 1890. Club membership was open to men and women on equal terms. May served as the club's first president. Sewall was also founder and president from 1886 to 1887 and again from 1888 to 1889 of the Western Association of Collegiate Alumnae which later merged with the Association of Collegiate Alumnae, the forerunner to the American Association of University Women.

== Suffragist ==
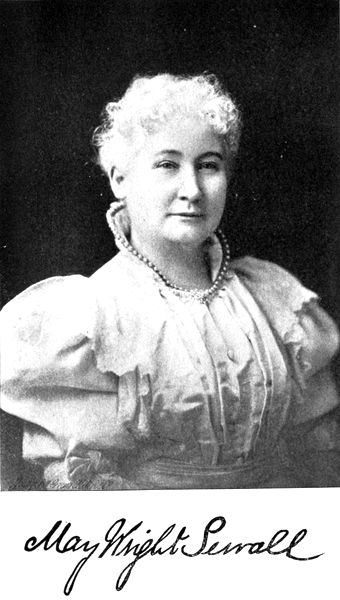
Sewall

Sewall is best known for her work in the woman's suffrage movement, especially her ability to organize and unify women's groups through a concept she called the council idea. The national and international councils she helped organize brought women of diverse backgrounds together to work toward larger interests. Beginning in 1878, when she helped form the Indianapolis Equal Suffrage Society, Sewall became active in campaigns for female suffrage in Indiana and was heavily involved in woman's suffrage at the national level.

=== Indiana activist ===
Sewall joined the woman suffrage movement in March 1878, when she was among the nine women and one man who secretly met to discuss formation of the Indianapolis Equal Suffrage Society. Sewall's work with this group brought her national recognition in women's movement, most notably her affiliation with the National Woman Suffrage Association}.

Sewall became involved in the state fight for women's right to vote in 1880, when the Indianapolis suffragists lobbied the Indiana General Assembly to pass a bill that would give Indiana women the right to vote on an equal basis with men. The suffrage supporters, including Sewall, were successful in getting the Indiana Senate and the Indiana House of Representatives to adopt a suffrage amendment to the state constitution in 1881, but state law required amendments to the state constitution to be passage at two consecutive legislative sessions. Indiana's suffrage groups worked statewide to secure passage of the amendment in the 1883 legislative session. The House resolution passed on February 20, 1883, but the Senate refused to act on it. Frustrated with the Indiana legislature's failure to amend the state constitution, Sewall turned her efforts to securing voting rights for women at the national level.

=== National and international affiliations ===
Sewall first arrived on the national scene in 1878, when she gave a speech at the National Woman Suffrage Association's convention in Rochester, New York, as a representative of the Indianapolis Equal Suffrage Society. Over the next three decades Sewall was actively involved in the NWSA's efforts to secure voting rights for women. During Sewall's tenure as chairperson of the NWSA's executive committee from 1882 to 1890, the NWSA and the American Woman Suffrage Association, the two national suffrage organizations, combined into the National American Woman Suffrage Association.

In 1887, as chairman of the NWSA's executive committee, Sewall directed the organization's plans to celebrate the fortieth anniversary of the Seneca Falls Convention of 1848. The meeting was held in Washington, D.C. in 1888, and attracted delegates from the United States and Europe. Although Elizabeth Cady Stanton and Susan B. Anthony supported the idea of an international suffrage association, little was accomplished until Sewall's presentation at the NWSA's meeting in March 1888. Her idea was to form national and international councils of women's groups that would to bring women together for regular gatherings to discuss various topics beyond suffrage. Forty-nine delegates representing fifty-three national women's organizations approved the establishment of a fifteen-member committee that included Clara Barton, Frances Willard, Antoinette Brown Blackwell, Julia Ward Howe, Lucy Stone, and Sewall.

"In the 1890s, Sewall carried her feminist interests even further abroad" to successfully lead efforts to organize national and international confederations of women. Sewall traveled throughout Europe to encourage women's groups to establish a national council within each country. The national groups were eligible to join the International Council of Women. Sewall served as president of the National Council of Women for the United States from 1897 to 1899 and was president of the International Council of Women from 1899 to 1904. The national and international councils reached their peak during Sewall's lifetime. When the National American Woman Suffrage Association joined the National Council of Women, Sewall merged her involvement with the councils with her activities in the woman's suffrage movement.

Sewall obtained permission to hold the World's Congress of Representative Women, the first meeting of the International Council of Women, in conjunction with the World's Columbian Exposition in Chicago in 1893. Sewall struggled with other leaders over control of the gathering. Bertha Palmer, president of the fair's Board of Lady Managers and president of the woman's branch of the World's Congress Auxiliary's, and Ellen Henrotin, vice president of the auxiliary's woman's branch, viewed Sewall as a radical feminist and resented the implication that the National Council of Women was organizing the World's Congress. Sewall threatened to resign, but remained with the organizing group, who hosted a successful meeting. The weeklong World's Congress brought 126 national women's organizations together from around the world. Its estimated attendance was more than 150,000.

Sewall's work in establishing the National Council of Women in the United States led to her involvement in founding the General Federation of Women's Clubs. The federation's constitution was ratified in 1890. Sewall attended its first organizational meeting in February 1891, and helped to write its bylaws, but she was disappointed when the new organization decided not to join the National Council of Women. After serving as the first vice-president of the federation, her interest in the group gradually declined, and she turned her efforts toward the National Council of Women and other reform issues. U.S. President William McKinley appointed Sewall as U.S. representative of women to the Exposition Universelle (1900) in Paris.

== Later years ==
Disappointed at the amount she had received from Weaver, after Sewall's retirement from the Girls' Classic School in 1907 and her departure from Indianapolis, she depended on income from public lectures on women's rights and world peace. In 1916 Sewall retired from public life, and wrote a book about her experiences in spiritualism. Eliot, Maine, where there was "a center on the subject" of spiritualism, and Cambridge, Massachusetts, became her home base. Sewall returned to Indianapolis in October 1919, and died the following year.

=== Peace advocate ===
During the last fifteen years of her life Sewall combined her activities her interests in the women's movement and working for world peace. Sewall was active in the American Peace Society, and became chairperson of the International Council of Women's standing committee on peace and arbitration in 1904. She persuaded the National Council of Women for the United States and the International Council of Women to adopt peace programs in 1907 and 1909, respectively. The International Council of Women became a "driving force" in the peace movement worldwide. During the four Peace Congresses held between 1904 and 1911 Sewall was either a speaker or guest of honor, who represented the nearly eight million women of the International Council. In July 1915, Sewall attended the Panama–Pacific International Exposition in San Francisco, where she was chairperson and organizer of the International Conference of Women Workers to Promote Permanent Peace. The conference attracted five hundred delegates from the United States and eleven other countries.

In December 1915 Sewall joined Henry Ford and others on Ford's Peace Ship, an unofficial peace expedition aboard the Oscar II in an unsuccessful attempt to halt the war in Europe and bring the American troops home by year's end. Sewall was one of sixty delegates on the trip, which left Hoboken, New Jersey, bound for Norway, on December 4. Sewall hoped the effort would gain public attention to the cause for peace and strengthen the peace movement's resolve, but it received a mixed reaction from the press. After traveling through Norway, Sweden, Denmark, and the Netherlands, the group concluded their trip and departed for the United States in January 1916. Although some argued the trip served a useful purpose by bringing together idealists and journalists to help popularize the peace movement, others considered it a failure. Sewall was more optimistic; she thought it helped advance the hope for lasting peace. Following her return to the United States, Sewall toured the public lecture circuit, but soon disappeared from public life, possibly for health reasons (she was seventy-two) or was embarrassed by the trip's outcome, and turned to other pursuits.

=== Spiritualist ===
Sewall was a member of a Unitarian church in Indianapolis, but psychic research had been an interest since the 1880s. Sewall converted to spiritualism after attending a chautauqua meeting at Lily Dale, New York, in 1897. At Lily Dale Sewall met with a spiritualist medium, who asked her to write several questions on bits of paper that Sewall claimed never left her hands. Sewall then selected a slate that was wiped clear and tied with her own handkerchief. When Sewall later opened the slate at her hotel, expecting it to be blank inside, she found responses to her questions were legibly written on the slate. From that time she claimed to have had regular communications with her deceased husband, Theodore, and communicated with other deceased family members, a noted Russian pianist named Anton Rubinstein, and Père Condé, who was a medieval priest and physician from France.

Following Sewall's retirement from public life in 1916, she wrote a book describing her psychic experiences. Neither Dead Nor Sleeping (1920) was published two months prior to her death in July 1920. Indiana author Booth Tarkington, who wrote the introduction to her book, assisted in getting Bobbs-Merrill Company to publish it. The book received some positive reviews at the time of its publication. One New York Times Book Review described it as "striking" and "amazing is hardly too strong of a word." Other reviewers praised her sincerity.

The book's publication surprised many people, especially those who knew Sewall, because it revealed a previously unknown side of her life that she had concealed from the public for nearly twenty-five years. Sewall provided two reasons for concealing her involvement in the spiritualism movement until the publication of her book. She claimed those who contacted her from the spirit world told her keep quiet, and the few living friends who did know about her communications with the dead thought she had imagined them. Sewall explained her intent in publishing the book was to provide others with the "comfort of knowing the simplicity and naturalness of the life into which they passed" after their life on earth ended.

== Death and legacy ==
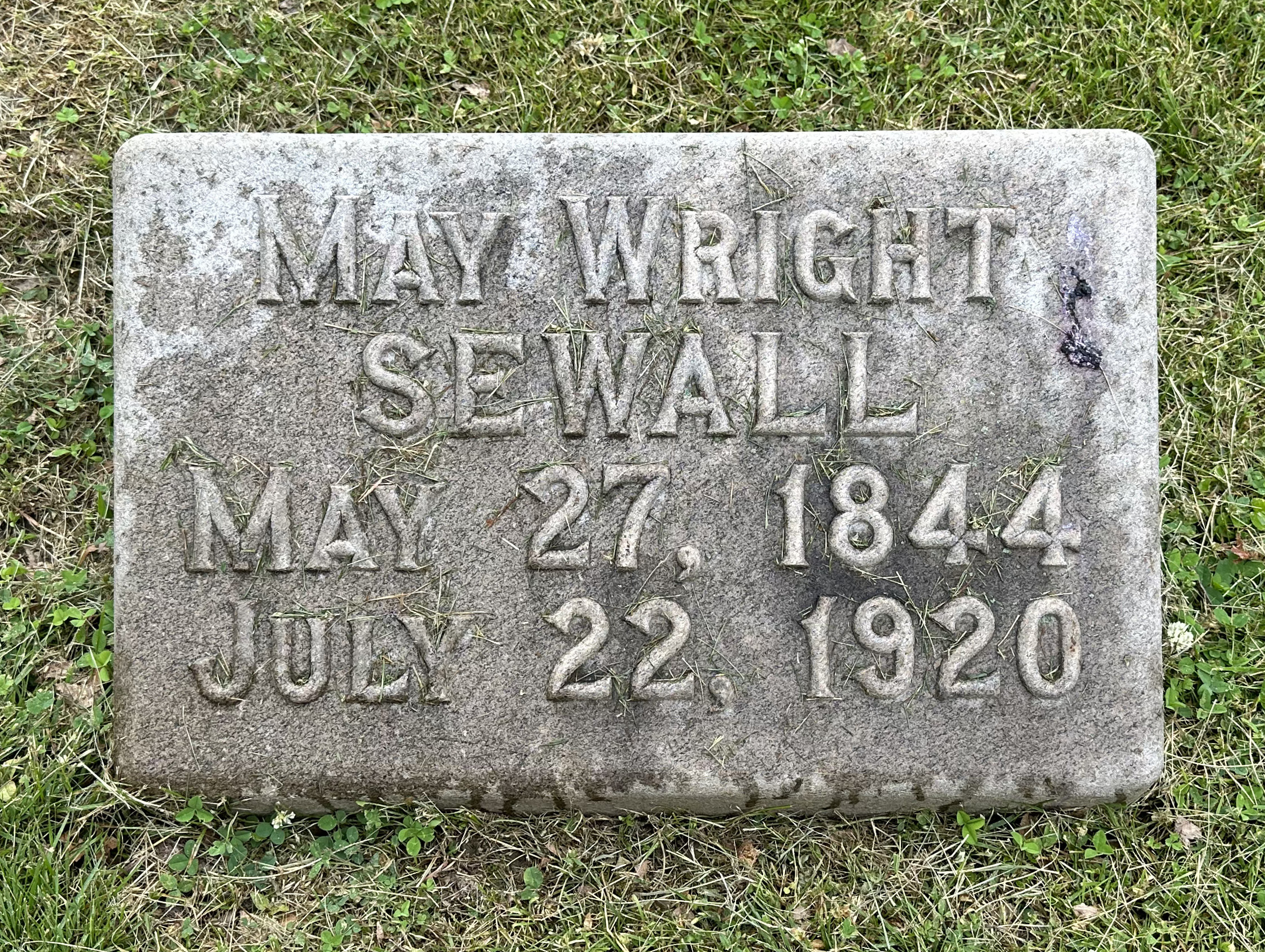
Sewall's gravestone at Crown Hill Cemetery

Sewall died on July 22, 1920, of "chronic parenchymatous nephritis" (kidney disease) at St. Vincent's Hospital, Indianapolis, at the age of seventy-six. Her funeral was held at All Souls Unitarian Church in Indianapolis. She is buried at Crown Hill Cemetery, Indianapolis, beside her second husband, Theodore.

Sewall was known for her service to humanity, especially the causes of education, women's rights, and world peace. Her greatest contributions to reform came through her efforts to organize and lead the National Council of Women in the United States and International Council of Women at the turn of the twentieth century. Sewall did not live to see the ratification of the Nineteenth Amendment, which was ratified in August 1920, a month after her death.

Sewall's legacy of civic-mindedness remains evident in the Indianapolis organizations she helped to establish, most notably the Indianapolis Woman's Club, the Indianapolis Propylaeum, the Indianapolis Museum of Art, and the John Herron Art Institute.

In later years the publication of Sewall's book, Neither Dead Nor Sleeping (1920), and her beliefs on spiritualism overshadowed her thirty-year career in education and longtime support of women's rights.

== Works ==
=== Books ===
- The Higher Education of Women (1915)
- The Woman Suffrage Movement in Indiana (1915)
- Women, World War and Permanent Peace (1915)
- Neither Dead Nor Sleeping (1920)

=== Other ===
- "Culture—Its Fruit and Its Price"
- Sewall also edited a woman's column for the Indianapolis Times.

== Honors and awards ==
- In 1893 the U.S. government presented Sewall an award for her work in organizing the World's Congress of Representative Women at Chicago.
- In May 1923 the Sewall Memorial Torches, a pair of bronze lampposts, were dedicated to her memory at the John Herron Art Institute (the present-day Herron High School) in Indianapolis.
- In 2005 the Propylaeum Historical Foundation established the May Wright Sewall Leadership Award to recognize other Indianapolis women for their community service.
- In 2019, the Indiana Historical Bureau added an historical marker.

== See also ==
- List of suffragists and suffragettes
- List of women's rights activists
- Timeline of women's suffrage in the United States
- History of feminism
