= In Chancery =

1920 novel by John Galsworthy

- Author: John Galsworthy
- Language: English
- Series: The Forsyte Saga
- Genre: Novel
- Publication place: Great Britain
- Preceded by: The Man of Property
- Followed by: To Let

In Chancery is the second novel of the Forsyte Saga trilogy by John Galsworthy. It was originally published in 1920, some fourteen years after The Man of Property. Like its predecessor, it focuses on the personal affairs of a wealthy upper middle class English family.

== Synopsis ==
The novel concentrates on the marital failures of Soames Forsyte, to a lesser extent that of his sister Winifred Dartie, and on the building antipathy between Soames and his cousin Young Jolyon Forsyte, who develops a friendship with Soames' estranged wife Irene. This friendship eventually leads to an affair and Irene's divorce from Soames.
