= The Voices (novel) =

1920 novel by Mrs. I. Lowenberg

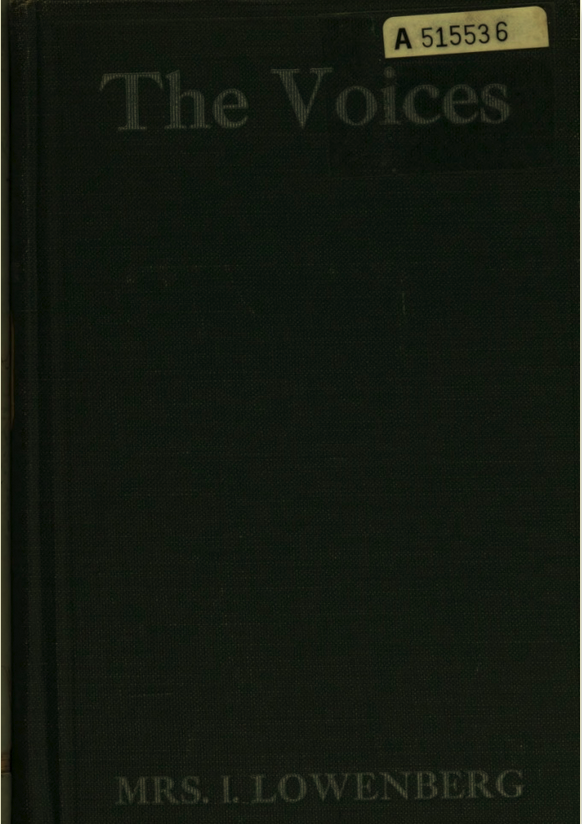
- 1920 first edition
- Author: Mrs. I. Lowenberg
- Language: English
- Publisher: Harr Wegner Publishing Company
- Publication date: 1920
- Publication place: United States
- Pages: 272

The Voices is an American novel by Mrs. I. Lowenberg (San Francisco, Harr Wegner Publishing Company, 1920), which contained much matter on the necessity of political reforms. Described as a novel for the 1920 United States presidential election, it revolves around a present-day Joan, not of Ark, but of one who listened to small voices within and became, in consequence, a leader in industrial and political happenings. A graduate of the University of California, Berkeley, the heroine secured a position in an iron and steel plant and took part in the questions which arose there between capital and labor. Romance and love-interest are also a part of the story which introduces personalities on both sides of the issues of industry. "Equal rights to all — unions and non-unions, organized and unorganized labor", declares the heroine, her intelligence stimulated by the mystic voices that speak to her from out the impalpable air.

== Overview ==
A purposeful novel in which the author tells the story of Joan Lynn, who was born into the world, as she herself thought, with a mission to accomplish. The girl had a fashion of listening to voices that seemed to talk to her after the fashion of voices that spoke to Joan of Arc. Born in San Francisco, the heroine was educated at the University of California and became a stenographer in one of the plants of the San Francisco Bay region. Following the voices to which she listened, she became an important factor in the settlement of troubles between capital and labor.

At the great mass meetings, held in the Civic Auditorium by this San Francisco woman of public wisdom and private honor, both sides of the picture are presented to her audiences. She tells them that employers cannot be forced to respect their contracts and employees allowed to violate them at pleasure. Both sides must obey the law. She deprecates the class complaint that professional men are highly paid, by telling of the years it requires to become a doctor. In his student days, he receives no pay while the mechanical apprentice gets wages in learning his trade. She proves to her audiences that labor and capital are mutually dependent; that inventions of machinery have increased production and helped humanity. She informs her hearers of the expedients resorted to by Solon the wise man of Greece to prevent evils that still exist. At another great mass meeting in the Civic Auditorium, at which Joan Lynn answers many questions and sways her audience, she sketches for them the industrial and political conditions in Europe in the Middle Ages when the guilds excluded apprentices.

== Characters ==
Joan Lynn is a stenographer, born amidst an industrial population, educated at the University of California, and inspired to utter truths that indicate the panacea for various governmental and economic defects to be discussed in the forthcoming Presidential contest. Voices from the empyrean, unheard by other mortals, guide Joan Lynn. From her childhood, she was a superwoman in that respect, but a womanly woman in her emotional qualities — a reincarnation as it were of Joan of Arc in her love of country and of justice.

== Themes ==
With the fanciful settlement that Joan Lynn was able to make in the story, Lowenberg seems to embody her own political and economic philosophy, and, with the lure of an interesting love story, attempts to bring home to her reading public the method which she believes will be successful in settling the difficulties that arise between capital and labor. For example, the reader is asked to consider the merit of the changes in governmental policies which the heroine, Joan Lynn, advises at great mass meetings in the Civic Auditorium of San Francisco.

There are several reforms suggested by the mystic voices with Joan Lynn acting as a medium. Among them is the election of the President by direct vote of the people instead of the electoral system. The term of the President's office, she urged, should be eight years without re-election. Another important reform that the mystic voices advised is the limitation of a declaration of war to the people. Congress might recommend a war, but the people would exercise the power of ratification. The private ownership of public utilities, but supervised by the government was also advised by the voices, speaking through Joan Lynn. Protective tariff, an eight-hour day, a minimum wage, restriction of immigration, strikes, deportation of anarchists, and the proper teaching of Americanization were all discussed by Joan Lynn. The discussions form an important section of Lowenberg's novel, which were meant to be useful reading for voters puzzling over the problems of the Presidential campaign of 1920.

== Publication ==
- The Voices, by Mrs. I. Lowenberg (San Francisco, Harr Wegner Publishing Company, 1920)
