= Krishna Lal Adhikari =

Nepali author (1888–1923)

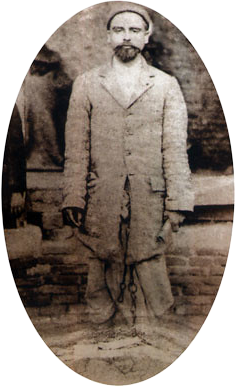
- Krishna Lal Adhikari in prison
- Born: 5 February 1888; Rapti District, Kingdom of Nepal
- Died: 9 December 1923 (aged 35); Kathmandu, Kingdom of Nepal
- Other names: Subba Krishna Lal Adhikari; Krishnalal Adhikari
- Occupation: Writer
- Notable work: Makaiko Kheti (1920)

Krishna Lal Adhikari (Nepali: कृष्णलाल अधिकारी, 5 February 1888 – 9 December 1923) was a Nepali author best known for publishing Makaiko Kheti (1920), a book about maize cultivation that was accused of being treasonous. He was sentenced to nine years in prison and died in jail. After his death, he was recognised as the first "literary martyr" in Nepal. Tinlal Park in Manthali, Ramechhap, is named after him.

== Early life and career ==
Adhikari was born in what is the modern-day Ramechhap District on 5 February 1888, and went on to become a "Subba" government official. He worked in the Office of Foreign Affairs. Adhikari was an advocate of freedom of speech and personal expression.

Adhikari was inspired to write a book about maize cultivation after reading an Indian book his friend gave him. With permission from Nepali Bhasha Prakashini Samiti (Nepali Language Publication Committee), he released Makaiko Kheti in July 1920. Two pundits – Ramhari Adhikari and Bhojraj Kafle – told prime minister Chandra Shumsher Jang Bahadur Rana about the book; they blamed the author for "mischievous expressions to treason". Chandra reportedly said that Krishna Lal Adhikari "made a symbolic attack" on him because the book contained "a comparative analysis of the utility of a dog of an English breed and a native dog".

On 2 August 1920, Adhikari was sentenced to nine years in prison, with the option of reducing his sentence to six years if he gave all 1,000 copies of the book to the government. He tried to hand over all of the copies but one had gone missing, which he could not locate. The 999 copies were torched. No known copies survive.

The same year, Makaiko Kheti was published again without the references to the Rana dynasty, under a new title, Krishi Shikshvali.

== Death and legacy ==
Adhikari died from tuberculosis three years later whilst in prison. While on his deathbed, the guards took him for a sunbath; they asked Chandra Shumsher to release him but he declined. It is said that the same day, Adhikari wrote on the ground: "Doom for the Ranas". Adhikari's father asked Chandra Shumsher for the authorization to cremate his son in the Pashupatinath Temple, but the request was declined, saying he had been imprisoned to "die decaying". One author wrote that Adhikari was treated inhumanely inside the cell.

KP Sharma Oli, Prime Minister of Nepal beginning in 2015, recognized Krishna Lal Adhikari as one of the martyrs who helped end the authoritarian government. Tinlal Park in Manthali, Ramechhap, is named after Adhikari, alongside revolutionary Gangalal Shrestha and politician Pushpalal Shrestha. Adhikari was praised as the first "literary martyr" in Nepal.

Makaiko Arkai Kheti is a book based on Adhikari which was later adapted into a play; it deals with the author's search for freedom of speech.
