= Zara Wright =

African-American author

Zara Wright was an African-American author based in Chicago. Her only known published works are Black and White Tangled Threads and its sequel Kenneth, published under the same cover in 1920.

What information there is about her is found in the preface of her first novel, Black and White Tangled Threads, which was dedicated to her husband, J. Edward Wright, whose memory the book is dedicated to. A favorable one-paragraph review in the Chicago Defender described the book as a "realistic portrayal of individuals and events [that] lift one to the heights of earthly ambitions".

Both novels concern the lives of two families and contain tales of love triangles and hidden racial identities. There are also messages of racial uplift but these are secondary to the melodrama to be found in both novels.

It is not known where she was born nor how and when she died.

== Books ==
- Black and White Tangled Threads. (Includes the sequel Kenneth.) Chicago; Barnard & Miller, 1920. Reprinted New York: AMS Press, 1975.
