= Frank K. Mott =

American mayor (1866–1958)

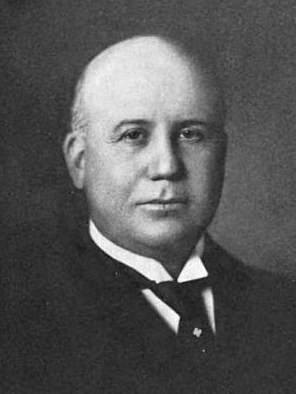
Mayor Frank K. Mott

Frank Kanning Mott (January 21, 1866 – 1958) was the 35th mayor of Oakland, California.

Mott was born in San Francisco on January 21, 1866, but his family moved to nearby Oakland when he was two years old. His father, who worked for the Central Pacific Railroad (later Southern Pacific Railroad), died when he was 11. To support the family, Mott quit school and worked as a messenger boy for Western Union and then as a telephone operator, the first ever in Oakland, according to his obituary in the Tribune. He entered the hardware business as a clerk at the age of 16, eventually becoming the sole proprietor of Frank K. Mott Co. He entered politics in 1894 when then-Mayor George Pardee appointed him to the city council to fill H.P. Dalton's vacant seat. He went on to serve two more terms before being elected mayor in 1905.

Mott, known as "The Mayor Who Built Oakland", presided over the greatest disaster relief operation in Oakland when an estimated 150,000 people sought refuge in the city after the 1906 earthquake in San Francisco. He was re-elected in 1907 by a six-to-one margin, defeating Socialist O.H. Phillbrick, 7,317 to 1,226, and re-elected to the third term in 1909, defeating Citizens' Party candidate F.F. Jackson 8,352 to 6,045. Following the adoption of a new city charter establishing a city commission government in 1910, Mott won the 1911 election by defeating Socialist opponent Thomas Booth, 11,722 to 9,837. In a fascinating but little-known chapter of Oakland history, Mott survived the city's first recall election, initiated by the radical Industrial Workers of the World, on August 5, 1912, with 17,139 voting in favor of keeping Mott in office, and 10,846 against.

He achieved, in 1909, final resolution of the waterfront issue which had preoccupied the leaders of Oakland since the city's founding, with a negotiated agreement with Southern Pacific. The railroad gave up its rights to the waterfront in exchange for a fifty-year franchise on the property it then held. In 1909, Mayor Mott welcomed President William H. Taft to Oakland. The Mayor laid the cornerstone for the present City Hall. The massive harbor improvements which immediately followed were part of an unprecedented era of public works projects, including the dredging of Lake Merritt, the building of the current City Hall and the Civic Auditorium (now known as the Kaiser Convention Center), establishment of the pioneering Oakland Public Museum in the Josiah Stanford (now Camron-Stanford) House, and vast expansion and improvements to sewers, streets, lighting, electricity, fire and police protection. Mayor Mott retired in 1915.

On January 10, 1911, Mott married Mrs. Gertrude Bennett in San Francisco. His family lived at three different addresses while he was mayor—1066 Jackson (1905–08), 1509 Webster (1909–1911), and 276 Lee Street in Adams Point (1912–1939)—all since demolished. He served as the city's right-of-way agent from 1927 until his death on December 16, 1958, at the age of 92, at the Athens Athletic Club. An Episcopalian, Mott was cremated following his funeral at the Chapel of the Oaks under the auspices of Masonic Lodge 61.
