= Circle (disambiguation) =

A circle is a simple geometric shape.

Circle or circles may also refer to:

== Humanities ==
- Social circle, a group of socially interconnected people
- Circle time

== Transportation ==
- Traffic circle, a type of circular intersection in which traffic must travel in one direction around a central island
- Circle Line (disambiguation), a mass transit line that contains a circle
- Circle Interchange, Chicago, a freeway interchange

== Companies ==
- Circle (company), a consumer finance company
- Circle (healthcare partnership), a healthcare company
- Circles (film distributor), a women's film organisation

== Places ==
- Circle, Alaska, US
- Circle, Montana, US
- Circle Interchange, Chicago
- Circle, an alternative name for an administrative sub-district in India; see Tehsils of India
- Centre for Innovation, Research and Competence in the Learning Economy, an interdisciplinary research centre in Lund, Sweden
- Circle (administrative division), administrative country subdivision

== Music ==
=== Bands ===
- Circle (Finnish band), rock music group
- Circle (American band), jazz group

=== Labels ===
- Circle Records, 1940s jazz record label
- Circle Records (Germany), 1970s jazz record label

=== Albums ===
- Circle (Amorphis album), 2013
- Circle (Boom Bip and Doseone album), 2000
- Circle (C418 album), 2010
- Circle (Deen album), 2013
- Circle (George Cables album), 1985
- Circle (Kaela Kimura album), 2006
- Circle (Onew album), 2023
- Circle (Onyanko Club album), 1987
- Circle (Scala & Kolacny Brothers album), 2010
- Circles (Dante Bowe album), 2021
- Circles (Gavin Harrison & 05Ric album), 2009
- Circles (Heroes & Zeros album), 2006
- Circles (Mac Miller album), 2020
- Circles (Marilyn Crispell album), 1991
- Circles (P.O.D. album), 2018
- Circles (Soil & "Pimp" Sessions album), 2013
- Circles (The Autumn Defense album), 2003
- Circles (The New Seekers album), 1972
- Circles (Unwed Sailor EP), 2006
- Circles, a 1974 album by Mary Travers
- Circles, a 2006 album by Shooting Star
- Circles, a 2015 album by Ewert and The Two Dragons

=== Songs ===
- "Circles" (Andrea Koevska song), 2022
- "Circles" (Atlantic Starr song), 1982, covered by Kimara Lovelace in 1998
- Circles (Berio), a 1960 composition by Luciano Berio
- "Circles" (Cavo song), 2012
- "Circles" (Christina Aguilera song), 2012
- "Circles" (Deno song), 2020
- "Circles" (George Harrison song), 1982
- "Circle" (Harry Chapin song), 1972
- "Circles" (Jana Kramer song), 2015
- "Circle" (Marques Houston song), 2007
- "Circles" (Pierce the Veil song), 2016
- "Circles" (Post Malone song), 2019
- "Circles" (Soul Coughing song), 1998
- "Circles" (The Who song), 1966
- "Circles (Just My Good Time)", a song by Busface featuring Sophie Ellis-Bextor, 2005
- "Circle", by Edie Brickell & New Bohemians their album Shooting Rubberbands at the Stars, 1988
- "Circle", by Argyle Park from their album Misguided, 1994
- "Circle", by Lacuna Coil from their album In a Reverie, 1999
- "Circle", by Cult of Luna from their album The Beyond, 2003
- "Circle", by Slipknot from their album Vol. 3: (The Subliminal Verses), 2004
- "Circle", by Mitski from her album Retired from Sad, New Career in Business, 2013
- "Circle", by Abhi the Nomad from his album Abhi vs the Universe, 2021
- "Circles", by Captain & Tennille from their album Come In from the Rain, 1977
- "Circles", by Joe Satriani from his album Surfing with the Alien, 1987
- "Circles", by Adam F from his album Colours, 1995
- "Circles", by Nonpoint from their album Development, 2002
- "Circles", by All Time Low from their album The Party Scene, 2005
- "Circles", by Drake Bell from his album Telegraph, 2005
- "Circles", by Baboon from their self-titled album, 2006
- "Circles", by In This Moment from their album Beautiful Tragedy, 2007
- "Circles", by Scott Weiland and the Wildabouts from their album Blaster, 2015
- "Circles", by MAX from his album Colour Vision, 2020
- "Circles", by Varials from their album Scars for You to Remember, 2022
- "Circles", by Kanye West from his album Bully, 2026
- "Circles", by James Blunt from his album Airplane Mode, 2026

== Film and television ==
- Circles (2013 film), a Serbian film
- Circle (2014 film), also known as Daire, a Turkish film
- Circle (2015 film), an American psychological thriller film
- Circle (Eddie Izzard), tour by British comedian Eddie Izzard
- "Circle", a first-season episode of the 1974 TV series Land of the Lost
- "Circles", an episode of the television series Teletubbies
- Circle (TV series), a 2017 South Korean sci-fi mystery TV series
- Circle Country, a country music and lifestyle internet-based TV platform channel
- Circle (2023 film), an Indian romantic drama film in the Telugu language
- "Circles" (Vice Principals), an episode of the American TV series Vice Principals

== Other uses ==
- Circles (essay), by Ralph Waldo Emerson
- Circle (sculpture), a public artwork by Sadashi Inuzuka
- Magic circle
- Google Circles, a feature of the Google+ social platform
- Doujin, a group of people who share an interest, activity, or hobby (The Japanese term is sometimes translated to English as "circle")

== See also ==
- Vienna Circle
- The Circle (disambiguation)
- Circle City (disambiguation)
- Circle symbol (disambiguation)
- Full Circle (disambiguation)
- Golden Circle (disambiguation)
- Inner circle (disambiguation)
- Magic circle (disambiguation)
- Vicious circle (disambiguation)
- Ring (disambiguation)
- O (disambiguation)
