= Goldring =

Goldring may refer to:

- Goldring (surname), a surname
- USS Goldring (SS-360), a Balao-class submarine
- The Gold Ring; A group (ring) of conspirators who manipulated the U.S. gold market on September 24, 1869, a.k.a. Black Friday
- Mount Goldring, Antarctica
- Goldring or gold-ring, a former common name for the white crappie (Pomoxis annularis)
- Goldring (audio company), an audio equipment manufacturing company
- Goldring, a former name for lands near Rosemont in Helenton Loch, Symington, South Ayrshire, Scotland
- Goldring Centre for High Performance Sport, at the University of Toronto in Ontario, Canada

== See also ==
- Gold ring (disambiguation)
- Goldring danio, Danio tinwini
- Golden Ring (disambiguation)
- Goldring surgeonfish, Ctenochaetus strigosus
