= The Circle =

The Circle may refer to:

== Film ==
- The Circle (1925 film), a film directed by Frank Borzage adapted from the Somerset Maugham play
- The Circle, a 1967 documentary directed by Mort Ransen
- The Circle, a 1997 film shot in Mexico, directed by Laurits Munch-Petersen
- The Circle (2000 film), directed by Jafar Panahi
- The Circle (2005 film), directed by Yuri Zeltser; see Angela Bettis
- The Circle (2014 film), Swiss docudrama, directed by Stefan Haupt
- The Circle (2015 film), directed by Levan Akin, based on the novel by Sara Bergmark Elfgren and Mats Strandberg
- The Circle (2017 film), directed by James Ponsoldt, based on Eggers's novel

== Television ==
=== Series ===
- The Circle (franchise), a reality competition television franchise
  - The Circle (British TV series), broadcast on Channel 4 between 2018 and 2021
  - The Circle (American TV series), broadcast on Netflix and Hulu since 2020
  - The Circle (Brazilian TV series), broadcast on Netflix in 2020
  - The Circle (French TV series), broadcast on Netflix in 2020
- The Circle (TV program), an Australian morning show broadcast on Network Ten between 2010 and 2012

=== Episodes ===
- "The Circle" (Star Trek: Deep Space Nine)
- "The Circle", the last episode of the 2008 television series Fear Itself

== Music ==
=== Groups ===
- Sammy Hagar and the Circle, a 2014 music group

=== Albums ===
- The Circle (Wipers album), 1988
- The Circle (B'z album), 2005
- The Circle (Bon Jovi album), 2009
- The Circle, a 2008 album by Ragnar Zolberg

=== Songs ===
- "The Circle" (song), a 1996 rock song by Ocean Colour Scene
- "The Circle", a song by Circle II Circle on the album Watching in Silence
- "The Circle", a song by Blackmore's Night on the album Secret Voyage
- "The Circle", a song by The Dream Syndicate on the album How Did I Find Myself Here?
- "The Circle", a song by Robert Forster on the album Calling from a Country Phone
- "The Circle", a song by Sault on the album 11

== Novels ==
- The Circle, Completed, a 2021 Witch Creek Road Season 2 storyline by Garth Matthams and Kenan Halilović
- The Circle, a series of novels by Ted Dekker
- The Circle (Elfgren and Strandberg novel), a young adult fantasy novel by Sara Bergmark Elfgren and Mats Strandberg
- The Circle (Eggers novel), a 2013 novel by Dave Eggers

== Places ==
- The Circle (Kingston upon Hull), a demolished cricket ground in Kingston upon Hull, England
- The Circle (Zürich Airport), a complex at Zürich Airport in Switzerland
- The Circle (Portsmouth, Virginia), a historic restaurant building in Portsmouth, Virginia
- The Circle, a colloquial name for Plaza Park (Orange, California), a public park

== Other uses ==
- The Circle (play), a 1921 play by W. Somerset Maugham
- "The Circle" (DC Comics), a Wonder Woman story arc
- The Circle (Image Comics), an Image Comics series
- The Circle (file system), a peer-to-peer distributed file system written mainly in Python
- The Circle (magazine), a Swiss gay magazine published 1932–1967
- The Circle School, a private school in Harrisburg, Pennsylvania, United States
- The Circle, a Romanian sect

== See also ==
- Le Cercle, a European foreign policy think-tank
- The Cyrkle, a 1960s US group
- Circle (disambiguation)
