= Golden Ring =

Golden Ring may refer to:

== Places ==
- Golden Ring of Russia, is a theme route over a ring of cities northeast of Moscow
- Golden Ring Hotel, hotel in Moscow
- Golden Ring Mall, shopping center in Rosedale, Maryland
- Golden Ring Middle School, school in Baltimore, Maryland, US

== Music ==
- Golden Ring (album), a 1976 country album by George Jones and Tammy Wynette, released in 1976
- "Golden Ring" (song), a 1976 country song by George Jones and Tammy Wynette, released in 1976
- "Golden Ring" (song by Eric Clapton), song from the 1978 album Backless
- Zolotoe Koltso, a Russian band

== Other uses ==
- a cultivar of Berberis thunbergii

== See also ==
- Goldring (disambiguation)
- Gold ring (disambiguation)
- Golden Circle (disambiguation)
- Golden (disambiguation)
- Ring (disambiguation)
