= Cedar Hollow Oxford =

Cedar Hollow Oxford, also known as The Oaks, is a woodland holiday accommodation site on the eastern outskirts of Oxford, England. Set within a 12-acre woodland near Shotover Hill and The Kilns, the former home of writer C. S. Lewis, it developed around Cedar Hollow Treehouse, a timber treehouse whose design draws on Lewis's fantasy series The Chronicles of Narnia.

The site later expanded to include two further themed accommodations, Faun's Hideaway and Beaver's Den. Cedar Hollow holds Gold certification from Green Tourism and in 2026 received the Silver award for Self-Catering Accommodation of the Year at the national VisitEngland Awards for Excellence.

== History ==
Cedar Hollow Treehouse was created by an artificial intelligence specialist and member of The Magic Circle.

The property was also used to host gatherings organised by the Congenital Anaemia Network for children with inherited blood disorders and their families.

By 2018, Cedar Hollow Treehouse had begun operating as holiday accommodation. The Evening Standard featured the property that year, describing its vaulted interior, handcrafted woodwork, rope bridge and elements inspired by Lewis's works.

The operation subsequently expanded into a multi-property site comprising Cedar Hollow Treehouse, Faun's Hideaway and Beaver's Den.

== Design and literary influences ==
The design of Cedar Hollow is inspired by the works of CS Lewis. Architectural and decorative elements include a wardrobe based on The Lion, the Witch and the Wardrobe, alongside interior spaces inspired by the homes of Mr Tumnus and Mr and Mrs Beaver. A concealed opening at the rear of the wardrobe leads onto the treehouse deck and a zip wire through the surrounding woodland.

Magic and illusion are recurring elements throughout Cedar Hollow, reflecting the designer's affiliation with The Magic Circle. The site incorporates interactive props and optical illusions, including talking mirrors, concealed mechanisms and installations distributed through the woodland and themed accommodation.

== Environmental management and beekeeping ==
Cedar Hollow holds a Gold award from Green Tourism, an independent sustainability certification programme for tourism businesses.

The woodland is managed to encourage biodiversity through native tree planting, areas of deadwood, wildflower planting and measures intended to reduce disturbance to nocturnal wildlife.

The site also maintains a working apiary, with honey produced from hives within the woodland. The apiary forms part of an on-site bee museum focusing on beekeeping, pollination, biodiversity and the ecological role of bees.

== Charitable activities ==
Cedar Hollow has been used for activities associated with the Congenital Anaemia Network. The site has hosted gatherings for children with congenital anaemias and their families, intended to allow families affected by uncommon inherited blood disorders to meet others with similar experiences.

The Sunday Times reported in 2025 that patients with congenital anaemia were offered complimentary stays at the properties and that the accommodation supported charitable work connected with the condition.

== Recognition ==
Cedar Hollow is rated as a five-star glamping site under the VisitEngland quality assessment scheme and holds a VisitEngland Gold Award.

In 2025, Cedar Hollow received Silver in the Self-Catering Accommodation of the Year category at the regional Beautiful South Tourism Awards. It subsequently became a national finalist for the 2026 VisitEngland Awards for Excellence where it received Silver for Self-Catering Accommodation of the Year.

In September 2026, Faun's Hideaway at Cedar Hollow received a VisitEngland ROSE Award.

== See also ==
- C. S. Lewis
- The Kilns
- Shotover Park
- The Chronicles of Narnia
