= Gold ring =

Gold ring may refer to:

- The Gold Ring; A group (ring) of conspirators who manipulated the U.S. gold market on September 24, 1869, a.k.a. Black Friday
- Gold Ring, an Arabic comic
- Gold ring of Pietroassa
- Wedding ring
- Engagement ring

== See also ==
- Rings of Gold, country music single
- Goldring (disambiguation)
- Golden Ring (disambiguation)
