= Denis Goldring =

British geologist

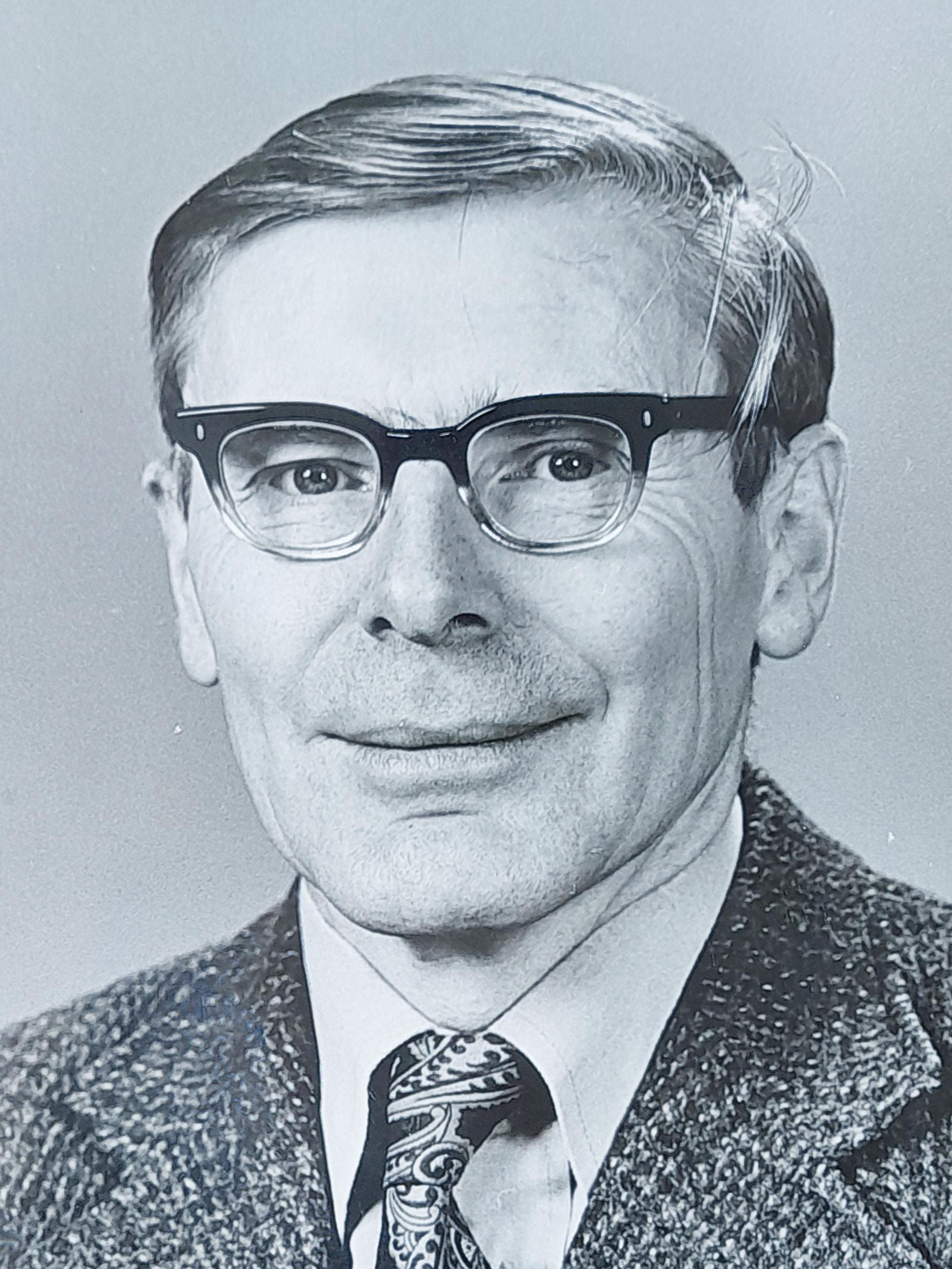
- Denis Goldring 1970
- Born: 30 June 1932; Brentford, Middlesex, England
- Died: 22 December 2024 (aged 92); Guisborough, England
- Education: University of Bristol (1950 - 1956)
- Known for: Iron ore mineralogy, Slag mineralogy
- Honours: Polar Medal 1964

Dr Denis Charles Goldring BSc PhD (30 June 1932 - 22 December 2024) was a British geologist. He worked in the Antarctic between 1957 and 1959 and Mount Goldring, a mountain in Graham Land, Antarctica, was named after him. He spent the rest of his career working as a geologist at the United Steel Companies and later the British Steel Corporation.

== Early life and education ==
Goldring was born on 30 June 1932 in Brentford, Middlesex, London. He was the second son of Alfred Charles Goldring, a commercial traveller working as a ventilation engineer, and Ethel Elizabeth Preston Case. His brother Roland Goldring (1928 – 2005), also a geologist, became a lecturer at Reading University and led research and published work on palaeontology, specifically ichnology. Goldring’s father died when he was 5 days old. Two years later, his mother moved with her two sons to Westward Ho! to run a guest house.

He attended Kingsley Preparatory School in Westward Ho!, Devon, until the age of eight. He continued his education at The Royal Commercial Travellers School (later known as the Royal Pinner School) in Pinner, NW London, his education being fully paid for by his late father’s company. He boarded at the school during term time. He studied Geology at The University of Bristol and graduated with a BSc in Geology 1953 and a PhD in Structural Geology in 1937; his PhD research was on the structural petrology of the Dalradian schists in NE Antrim, Northern Ireland.

== Geologist with FIDS in the Antarctic ==
From 1957, Goldring spent three years with the Falkland Islands Dependencies Survey (FIDS, now the British Antarctic Survey). The majority of his time was spent in and around Base W on Detaille Island, on the Antarctic Peninsula. Alongside his work developing a greater understanding of the geology of the Loubet Coast, he learned how to work with a dog team, as well as carry out meteorological observations and basic surveys. He spent much of his time working along the coast and in the mountains, often alone or in the company of only one other person. At the end of his time in Antarctica, the icebreaker RRS John Biscoe was unable to pick him and the other men up, so they trekked 30 miles across the ice to meet the ship. He was upset at leaving many of his notes and samples behind; the base at Detaille Island was never re-occupied and it still stands as a testament of that time. It was designated as Historic Site No. 83 under the Antarctic Treaty in 2009.

== Career ==
After a year writing up his report 'The Geology of the Loubet Coast, Graham Land' for FIDS, he joined the United Steel Companies in 1960; he worked as a petrologist at their Research and Development Department at Swinden Laboratories, Rotherham, Yorkshire. He worked on various projects and his speciality became microscopy. Prior to 1970, he worked almost exclusively on blast furnace materials - iron ore, sinter, slag, refractories, coal and coke. The Geology Section at Swinden Laboratories opened a new complex at Ladgate Lane in Middlesbrough and in 1975, he moved with his wife and three sons to Guisborough, North Yorkshire (formerly Cleveland). He became Section Head of the Geology Department and later Department Manager of the Mineral Resources Department. In 1982, he was transferred to Grangetown Laboratories, 3 miles east of Middlesbrough. Patterns of work changed and he used his microscopy skills to analyse material for the new Redcar ironworks. Later, he became a consultant for contracts awarded to British Steel Corporation (Overseas Services) and he used his expertise to study potential iron ore deposits in countries including Egypt, India, Mauretania, Turkey and Saudi Arabia. He took early retirement in 1992 but continued to work on various projects for British Steel. He also carried out consultancy work, examining slag samples for possible building projects.

He had a strong interest in local geology and industrial archaeology with the Cleveland Industrial Archaeology Society (CIAS), the Tees Valley Regionally Important Geological Sites (RIGS) group, and the Tom Leonard Mining Museum (now the Land of Iron) at Skinningrove. He wrote two books, ‘Along the Scar’ (2001) and ‘Along the Esk’ (2006), as well as articles for CIAS and other publications.

== Awards and legacy ==
For his exceptional scientific work, he was awarded the Polar Medal, which was presented to him by Queen Elizabeth II in 1963. He also has a mountain named after him, Mount Goldring, situated to the east of Lallemand Fjord in Graham Land, Antarctica.

== Death ==
He was married to wife Joan for 64 years and he passed away peacefully at Gracelands Care Home in Guisborough, North Yorkshire, at the age of 92. He is survived by three sons, John, Charles and David.

== Bibliography ==
As well as his research paper and two books about local geology, Goldring published several peer-reviewed technical papers, particularly in the JISI and the Applied Earth Science section of the Trans. IMM, and many shorter papers of more local interest in the journals, transactions and newsletters of local societies. The brief bibliography below gives a selection of his output.

=== Research paper ===
Goldring, D. 1962. The Geology of the Loubet Coast, Graham Land. British Antarctic Survey Scientific Report. 50 pp.

=== Books published and sold locally ===
Goldring, D. 2001. Along the Scar. Publ. Peter Tuffs, Guisborough, 145pp.

Goldring, D. 2006. Along the Esk. Publ. Peter Tuffs, Guisborough, 165pp.

=== Articles ===
Goldring D. and T.A.T. Fray 1989. Characterisation of iron ores for production of high-quality sinter. Jl Ironmak. Steelmak., 16, 83-89.

Goldring, D. and D. Greenwood 1990. Fluorite mineralisation at Beckermet iron ore mine, Cumbria. Trans. Inst. Min, Metall. (Sect. B:Appl. Earth Sci.), 99, B113-119.

Goldring D. 1990. Banded iron formation of Wadi Sawawin district, Kingdom of Saudi Arabia. Trans. Inst. Min, Metall. (Sect. B:Appl. Earth Sci.), 99, B1 - 14.

Goldring, D. 1991. Significance of pre- or syntectonic origin for certain iron ores hosted in banded iron formation. Trans. Inst. Min, Metall. (Sect. B:Appl. Earth Sci.), 100, B148-158.

Goldring D.C. & Juckes L.M. 2001. Iron ore supplies to the United Kingdom iron and steel industry. Trans. Instn. Min. Metall. Sect. A, 110, A75-A85.

Goldring D. & K. Ashworth 2003. Editors Special Issue on Iron Ore. Trans. Inst. Min. Metall. 112, Section B, 10 papers B1-100. Presented at a conference held in Perth, WA, September 2002.

Goldring, D. 2004. Boulby alum works. Ways down to the beach. CIAS Newsletter No. 85, 12,13. (Discussion of the two alum roads to the beach and the shaft and tunnel).

Goldring, D. 2006. Boulby alum tunnel. Cleveland Industrial Heritage no. 19, 20. (Brief description of the tunnel seen in 2004).

Goldring, D. 2007. Louis Hunton and Loftus alum works. Cleveland Industrial Heritage No. 21, 9-15. (Includes a copy of Hunton’s famous section emphasising points of industrial interest).

Golding, D. 2012. Geological background to the North Yorkshire alum industry. The Cleveland Industrial Archaeologist, 33, 43-65.

Goldring, D. 2015. Boulby Quarry SSSI Review. Tees Valley RIGS Group Newsletter, 17-27.

Goldring, D. 2015. Exploited ironstone resources of Cleveland: an overview with the emphasis on geological background. The Cleveland Industrial Archaeologist. 35, 19-55.

Goldring, D. 2016. Errington Woods. Tees Valley RIGS Group Newsletter, 14-22.

Goldring, D. and D. Greenwood 2018. Engineering geology applied to construction projects at Redcar Iron Works in the 1970s. The Cleveland Industrial Archaeologist. 38, 43-55.
