= City Circle (disambiguation) =

The City Circle is a largely-underground railway line in central Sydney, Australia.

City Circle may also refer to:

- City Circle tram, a tram service in central Melbourne, Australia, aimed at tourists
- M3 (Copenhagen Metro), also known as the City Circle Line, a circular line of the Copenhagen Metro
- City Circle, a former bus service of First West Yorkshire in England

== See also ==
- Circle City (disambiguation)
- City Loop, a subway and rail loop in central Melbourne
