= Circle City =

Circle City, or The Circle City, might refer to:

== Communities ==
=== Australia ===
- Canberra, the capital of Australia, also nicknamed "Circle City"

=== United States ===
- Circle, Alaska
- Dothan, Alabama, nicknamed "The Circle City"
- Circle City, Arizona
- Corona, California, nicknamed "'The Circle City"
- Indianapolis, Indiana, nicknamed "Circle City"
- Circle, Montana
- Pittsboro, North Carolina, nicknamed "Circle City"

== Other uses ==
- Circle City Airport, in Circle, Alaska
- Circle City Classic, an annual American football game in Indianapolis, Indiana
- Circle City Conference, an athletic conference of the Indiana High School Athletic Association
- Circle City Derby Girls, a flat track roller derby league in Indianapolis, Indiana
- Circle City Prep, a public charter school in Indianapolis, Indiana

== See also ==
- Places under Circle (disambiguation)
- City Circle (disambiguation)
