= Vicious Circle =

A vicious circle is a complex of events that reinforces itself through a feedback loop.

Vicious circle or Vicious Circle may also refer to:

== Music ==
- Vicious Circle (band), an Australian hardcore punk band formed in 1983
- Vicious Circle (album), a 1995 album by L.A. Guns
- Vicious Circle, a 1982 album by Zero Boys
- Vicious Circle, a punk rock band featuring Jack Grisham, Todd Barnes, Steve Houston and Laddy Tirrell, whose members later formed the band True Sounds of Liberty (1978)
- Vicious Circle, a 1989 album by The Vibrators
- "Vicious Circle", a 1981 single by Abrasive Wheels
- "Vicious Circle", a song by Lou Reed from Rock and Roll Heart
- "Vicious Circle", a song by Quiet Riot from Guilty Pleasures
- "Vicious Circles", a song by Aaron Lewis from Town Line

== Film ==
- The Vicious Circle (1948 film), a film starring Conrad Nagel
- The Vicious Circle (1957 film), a film starring John Mills
- Vicious Circle (2008 film), a 2008 drama film by Paul Boyd
- Vicious Circle, a name for the Algonquin Round Table in the 1994 film Mrs. Parker and the Vicious Circle

== Television ==
- Dane Cook: Vicious Circle, an HBO comedy special featuring Dane Cook
- "Vicious Circle", a 1957 episode of Alfred Hitchcock Presents

== Other uses ==
- Vicious Circle (painting), a painting by Polish Symbolist painter Jacek Malczewski
- Vicious Circle (comics), a fictional character group in Savage Dragon
- Vicious Circle (novel), a 2013 novel by Wilbur Smith.

== See also ==
- The Vicious Circle (disambiguation)
- Vicious Cycle (disambiguation)
- Vicious circle principle (mathematical logic)
