= Goldring (surname) =

Goldring is a surname. Notable people with the surname include:

- Danny Goldring, American film, stage and television actor
- Douglas Goldring (1887–1960), British writer
- Ellen Goldring (21st century), American academic
- Frederick Goldring (1897–after 1959), English amateur photographer, and recorder of churches and historic buildings
- John Goldring (born 1944), English judge
- Mark Goldring (born 1957), chief executive of Oxfam
- Mary Goldring (21st century), British journalist
- Peter Goldring (born 1944), Canadian politician
- Stephen Goldring (1908-1996), American businessman
- Stephen Goldring (cricketer) (born 1932), English cricketer and British Army officer
- William Goldring (businessman) (born 1942/1943), American businessman, chairman of the Sazerac Company
- Winifred Goldring (1888–1971), American paleontologist
