= The Vicious Circle =

The Vicious Circle may refer to:

== Film ==
- The Vicious Circle (1948 film), an American drama film directed by W. Lee Wilder
- The Vicious Circle (1957 film), a British thriller film directed by Gerald Thomas
- The Vicious Circle (1967 film), a Swedish drama film directed by Arne Mattsson
- Chakra / The Vicious Circle, a 1981 Hindi film with Alka Kubal

== Other uses ==
- The Vicious Circle, another name for Danish band Konkhra
- The Viscous Circle alternate title for Jean-Paul Sartre's play No Exit
- Byuha Chakra (The Vicious Circle), a 1984 novel by Bharat Jangam

== See also ==
- Vicious Circle (disambiguation)
