= Circle (sculpture) =

Public artwork by Sadashi Inuzuka

- Artist: Sadashi Inuzuka
- Year: 2005
- Type: Granite, sand
- Location: Indy Art Center; Indianapolis, Indiana, United States; 39°52′41.33″N 86°8′39.51″W
- Owner: Indy Art Center

Circle is a public artwork by Sadashi Inuzuka. The artwork is located in the ARTSPARK on the grounds of the Indy Art Center in Indianapolis, Indiana, United States.

== Description ==
Circle consists of a granite curved circle (reminiscent of a donut or liferaft) with an open center filled with a sandbox. A pole comes from the center of the artwork with a metal arm with triangular teeth placed in a row on the bottom part of it. It turns around in the sand, like a zen garden, with sounds going on and off periodically.

== Acquisition ==
The artwork was purchased with gifts from the Sheila Fortune Foundation, Sallie Mae Fund, June McCormick, Cinergy and EE Technologies.

== About the artist ==
Sadashi Inuzuka is an artist who works in ceramics, sculpture and installation. He received his BGA at Emily Carr University of Art and Design in 1985 and in 1987 obtained his MFA from the Cranbrook Academy of Art. In 1995 he was a seasonal instructor at Carr while serving (1994–1996) as faculty at University College of the Fraser Valley. In 1996 he became associate professor at the University of Michigan, receiving tenure in 2001. His artwork looks at the relationship of human society and the natural world, specifically water diversion, genetically modified crops and invasive species. He has received five awards and grants and participates in international panels and lectures. In 2003, the Indy Art Center hosted an exhibit of Inuzuka's work titled "Water Trade". Another exhibit titled "Mutation and Adaptation" is also noted for being hosted by the Indy Art Center in July–August 2003 which featured installations of Inuzuka's ceramics and metal castings.

== Information ==
To create the artwork Inuzuka, who is visually impaired, worked with students of the Indiana School for the Blind and Visually Impaired to create Circle. With the goal of providing ISBVI students with a place to gather at the ARTSPARK, the youth contributed ideas about the design of the artwork, leading to the tactile nature and recordings in the piece, which were also created by the students. A groundbreaking was held on June 5, 2004, at the ISBVI to celebrate the creation of what would become the Nina Mason Pulliam Sensory Path, where Inuzuka's installation would be at the end of the path. On creating the artwork Inuzuka sought to "do something with texture so the blind children could feel it".
