= Golden Circle =

Golden Circle may refer to:

- Golden Circle (Iceland), Icelandic tourist route
- Golden Circle (company), Australian food processor
- Golden Circle Air, U.S. aviation manufacturer
- Golden Circle, the proposal by the U.S. secret society the Knights of the Golden Circle to expand the slave-owning territories of the U.S. by annexing other territories
- Golden Circle (businessmen), nickname for ten businessmen who controversially bought shares in Anglo Irish Bank
- The golden circle, a leadership model described by Simon Sinek in Start With Why
- Golden Circle of Golf Festival (1961 tournament) LPGA golf tournament
- Kingsman: The Golden Circle, 2017 action spy film

== See also ==
- At the 'Golden Circle' Stockholm two albums by the Ornette Coleman Trio released in 1966
- Gold Circle (U.S. company) discount department store
- Gold Circle Films (U.S. company)
- Silver Circle, the second tier of English law firms; also known as the Golden Circle
- Golden Ring (disambiguation)
- Golden (disambiguation)
- Circle (disambiguation)
