= Indy Art Center =

Arts nonprofit based in Indianapolis, Indiana, US

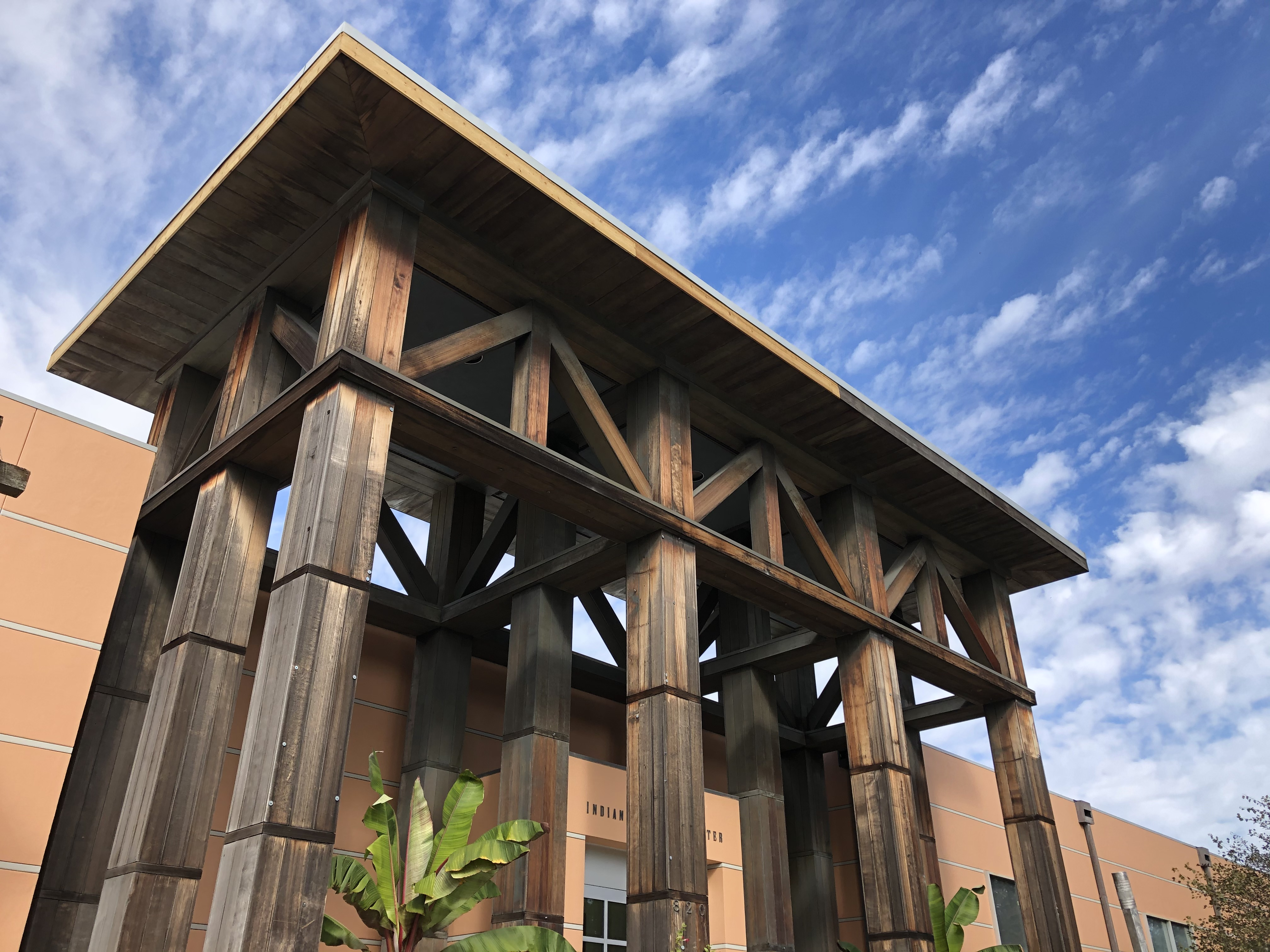
- Indy Art Center exterior in 2019
- Established: 1934; 92 years ago
- Location: Indianapolis, Indiana, United States
- Coordinates: 39.877807°N 86.143639°W
- Type: Art center
- Visitors: 206,823 (2019)
- Director: Mark Williams
- Website: www.indyartcenter.org

The Indy Art Center (formerly known as the Indianapolis Art Center) is a nonprofit art center located in Indianapolis, Indiana, United States. It was founded in 1934 by the Works Project Administration as the Indianapolis Art League. The center houses the Marilyn K. Glick School of Art, featuring an auditorium, classroom studios, galleries, a library, and a sculpture park along the White River. As of 2008 the Indianapolis Art Center featured over 50 annual exhibitions and had over 3,000 members.

== History ==
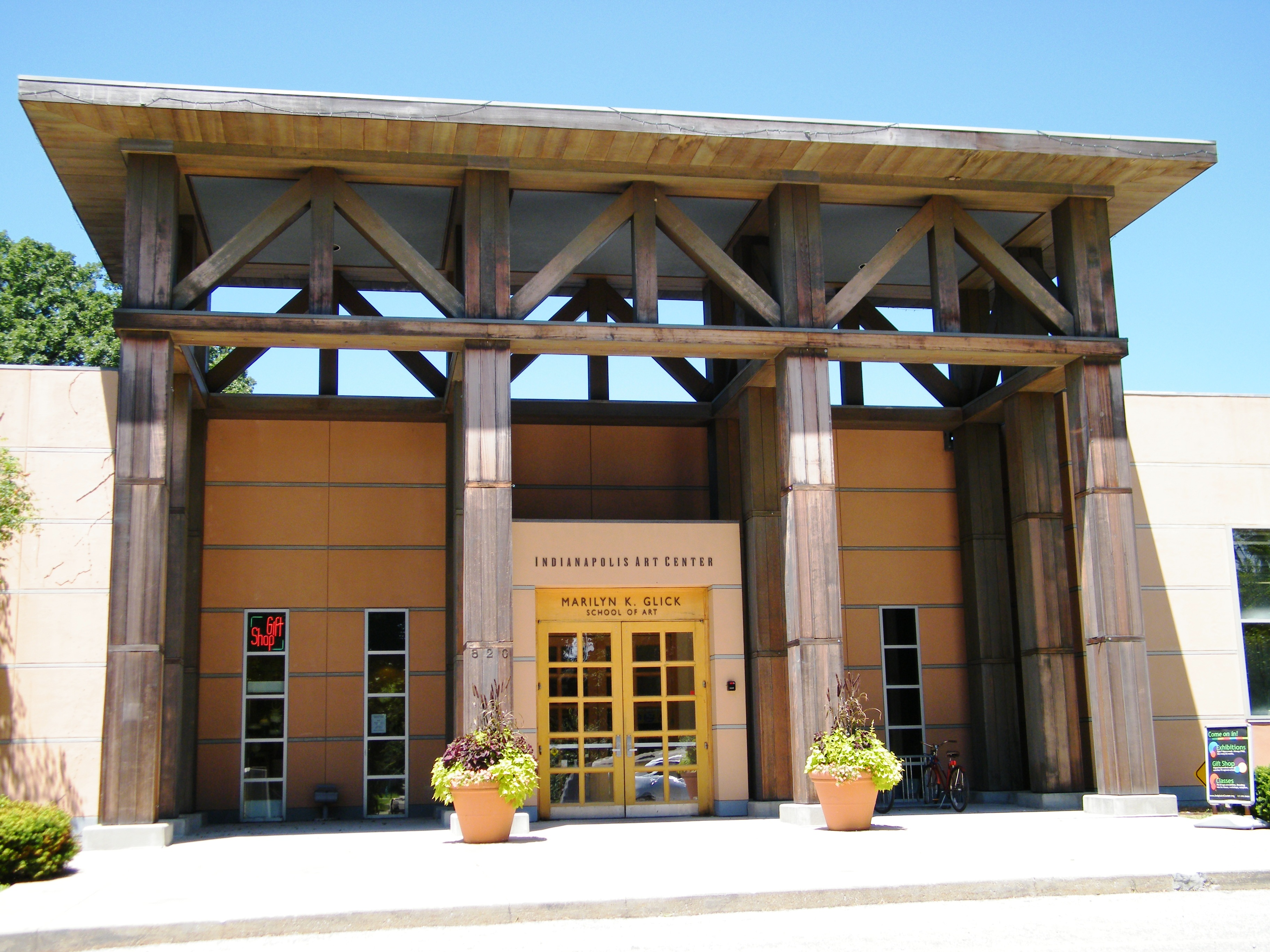
IAC's main entrance, designed by Michael Graves

William Kaeser founded the non-profit Indianapolis Art League in 1934. The group that would eventually become the Indianapolis Art Center was funded as a Works Progress Administration project under President Franklin D. Roosevelt's administration during the Great Depression. Kaeser, an Austrian graduate of the Herron School of Art and Design, had started organizing adult education art study groups, starting with a group of ten women at Public School 72. In 1938, the art study groups formed into the Indianapolis Art Students' League, its name and character influenced by the populist Art Students League of New York.

Due to gas rationing during World War II, classes were located at various venues throughout Indianapolis, eventually settling at Public School 66. By the 1950s, the group had to seek other quarters and finally settled at the Holliday House at Holliday Park in 1952. The House served as the first permanent venue for the Indianapolis Art League until it burned down in 1958.

After the fire, the Art League began raising funds for a new facility, and in 1960 they became incorporated as the Indianapolis Art League Foundation. Major gifts were made by members, corporations, the public, the Elsie Sweeney Foundation and the Indianapolis Foundation, as well as a land gift at 3103 North Pennsylvania St. by John and Marguerite Fehsenfeld. The Art League built its first new facility with two art studio classrooms and a lobby.

Twelve to fifteen years later, the League sought new space, and in 1976 raised $300,000, with large gifts from the Indianapolis Foundation and Lilly Endowment. With director M. Steele Churchman, they built a new 10,200 sq ft (950 m^{2}). venue along the White River in Broad Ripple Village; it had five studios, a gallery, a library and offices. Classes doubled within the first year—totaling 40 a week. With these successes, in 1976 the Art League hired its first executive director Joyce Sommers; she was a former student who had become a board member at the center.

In the early 1980s the Center attempted to run a retail store on site, but it failed and they closed it. The sale allowed the center to buy more land. The Art League's architectural expansion began in 1989 with the Riverfront Performance Terrace. By 1993 the Art League hosted 100 classes a week with 55 part-time faculty members.

By 1994 they had raised $7.6 million in their capital campaign and completed the new building in 1996. That year the Art League changed its name to the Indianapolis Art Center, in accordance with its major expansion. In 2009 Sommers retired after 33 years of service.

After a national search Patrick Flaherty became president and executive director in September 2014.

== Architecture ==
The Indianapolis Art Center's 40,000-square-foot (3,700 m^{2}) building was designed by Indiana-born architect Michael Graves. Graves, a former high school classmate of director Joyce Sommers, was handpicked by Center leaders. He was given complete creative control over the project, $6 million at the time of original construction. Funds were raised by a capital campaign, a major contribution from the Ruth Lilly, the Lilly Endowment and other corporate and civic organizations. Construction was completed by Indianapolis-based Shiel-Sexton Company, who was chosen by a committee of local architects, and was completed on time and on budget.

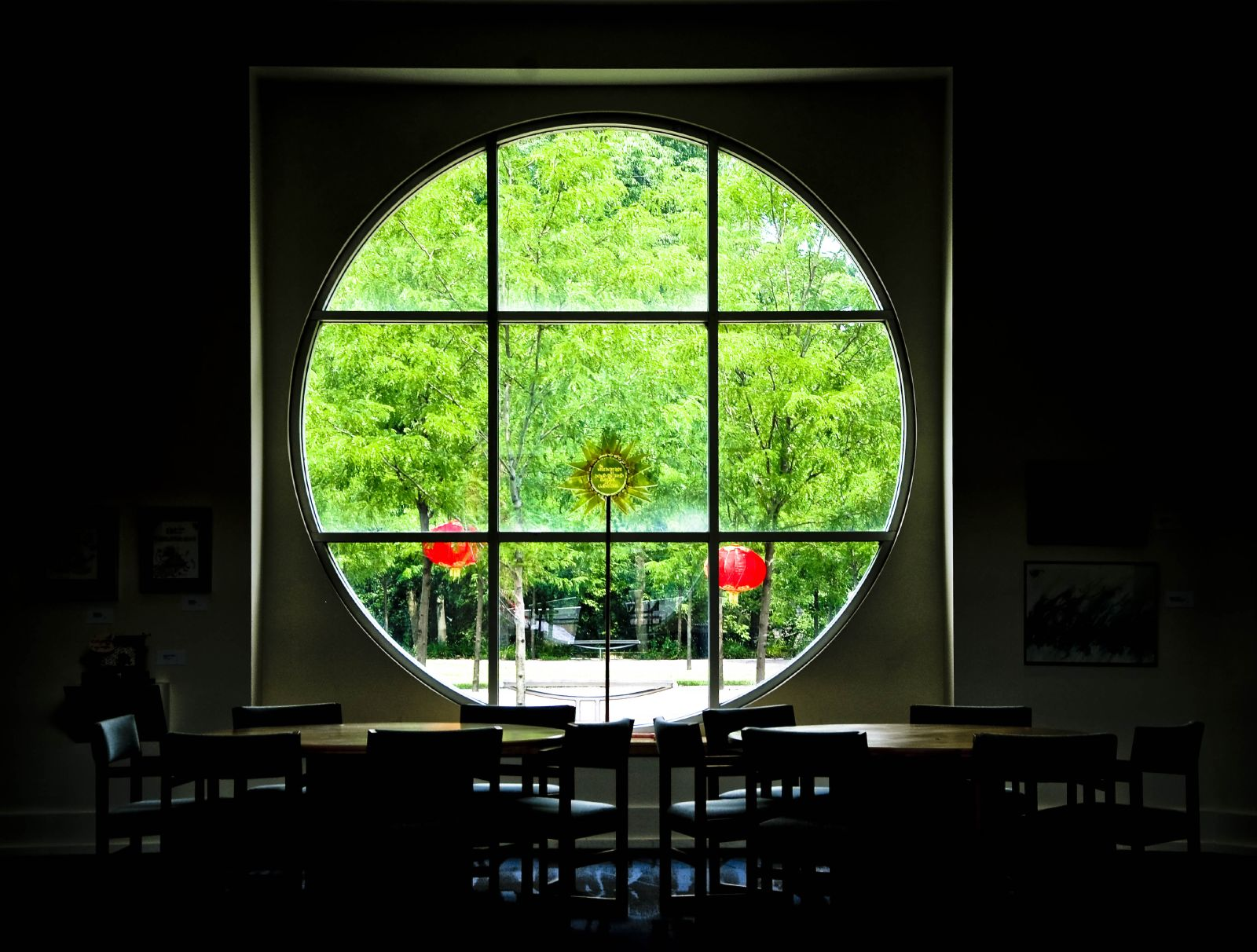
Inside looking out of the Ruth Lilly Library

The first phase was started in October 1994 and completed in August 1995 with a stucco building housing a 225-seat auditorium, art gallery and six art studios. Upon the demolition of the original building, the second phase began, to be opened May 31, 1996. The new $8.2 million facility would feature three art galleries, 13 art studios, a gift shop and auditorium. It is four times larger than the previous building. The Center features Grave's signature style: the building's entry portico has 32-foot (9.8 m) columns, large rectangular and round windows flank smaller counterparts throughout the facade, and the stucco is painted peach, red ochre and blue. The back of the building features another portico that overlooks the White River and a sculpture garden.

The two buildings are connected by the Churchman-Fehsenfeld Studio. The west building is home to the Ruth Lilly Library, an octagonal two-story atrium with 12-foot (3.7 m)-diameter circular windows on all sides, and a fireplace with ceramic tiles fired in the center's own kiln. The west building features the center's administrative offices, the Stan & Sandy Hurt conference room, a studio prep and storage area, painting, drawing, printmaking, photography and computer graphics studios. The east half of the building consists of studios for woodworking, glassblowing, ceramics, metalsmithing, steel and stone sculpture and benchwork.

With this building, Graves was not seeking an Indianapolis connection in the architectural design, but a look related to the industrial look of studio art spaces and renovated industrial spaces of San Francisco or SoHo. The east and west side of the building are capped by chimneys—one for the library and one for the kiln, adding to the industrial look and feel of the space. Upon its completion, Sommers stated, "The new building has given us greater visibility and a much stronger community profile."

== Education ==
Historically the Art Center's program has been influenced by Western art history and techniques. Artists such as Elmer Taflinger taught at the Art League until 1965. The mid-1990s renovations allowed for new art studio and classrooms to be built. An overhead crane is on campus for transporting steel and stone into the sculpture studio. The glassblowing studio had enabled the center to become one of only nine facilities in the country to allow regular public classes. As of 2008 the center was working towards a fundraising goal of $15 million to complete a master plan for the glass art program.

The Marilyn K. Glick School of Art serves as the center's on-site educational facility, with programming including classes about glass making, woodworking, steel fabrication, ceramics, metalsmithing, textiles, painting, furniture refinishing, and photography. The center also offers artist referral services and a library with over 5,000 volumes that are open to the public.

IAC offers nearly 300 courses per semester to the public, with the fall and spring semesters hosting over 4,000 students. Summer school is also offered working with upwards of 1,400 students. The IAC's Fine Arts Day Camp which teaches children ages 7–12 a variety of creative skills and youth age 10–13 specialized skills. Picasso Camp serves pre-school children and involves learning about fine art and music. These youth camps hosted 400 youth in 2009. In 2010 IAC started providing educational programming for Fall Creek Academy, providing students with access to the campus and classes taught at the center and at the school. IAC offers scholarships, opportunities in continuing education, selected certifications and classes for Marian University credit.

== Exhibitions ==
The Indianapolis Art Centers's exhibition programming began in 1937, featuring the work of artists from Indiana and the Midwest region. They held their first annual art competition at the Lyman Brothers art gallery and throughout the city with exhibitions such as "The Indianapolis Art Students' League Annual Exhibition" which was held at the William H. Block Co. for 15 years, the "500 Festival of Arts" in downtown storefronts until 1973, "Art 500" at the Indianapolis Convention Center, and since 1976 the biannual "Indiana Directions and Regional" at the Art League galleries.

With its current home, three exhibition spaces anchor the Main Gallery in the center of the building, which stretches from the entrance to the rear exit. IAC hosts a juried student show with prize money and opportunities for students to sell their work. The top five student winners receive the opportunity to exhibit during the faculty show.

The center also hosts traveling exhibitions alongside its own curated exhibitions. In 1999 IAC hosted "Graham Nash and Nash Editions", organized by the Butler Institute of American Art, featuring the photographs of Graham Nash and related photographs from his Nash Editions. As of 2010 Patrick Flaherty has served as exhibition director who through his work at IAC "would like to see is a demystification of art."

=== Notable exhibitions ===
==== A Life in Art: Works by George Rickey ====
In the summer of 2009 IAC played host to a retrospective exhibit on the kinetic sculptures, models and sketches of Indiana artist George Rickey. The center also worked with the Arts Council of Indianapolis and the City of Indianapolis to exhibit works of Rickey's throughout the city.

== Gardens and grounds ==
The Art Center's semi-wooded grounds cater to private and public events including the Indy Jazz Fest, Indiana Microbrewers Festival, Broad Ripple Music Fest, and the Broad Ripple Art Fair. Located to the west of the main building is the Cultural Complex which was acquired by the Art Center in 2003 as a home for the fabric department, Writer's Center of Indianapolis, and a studio space.

=== ArtsPark ===
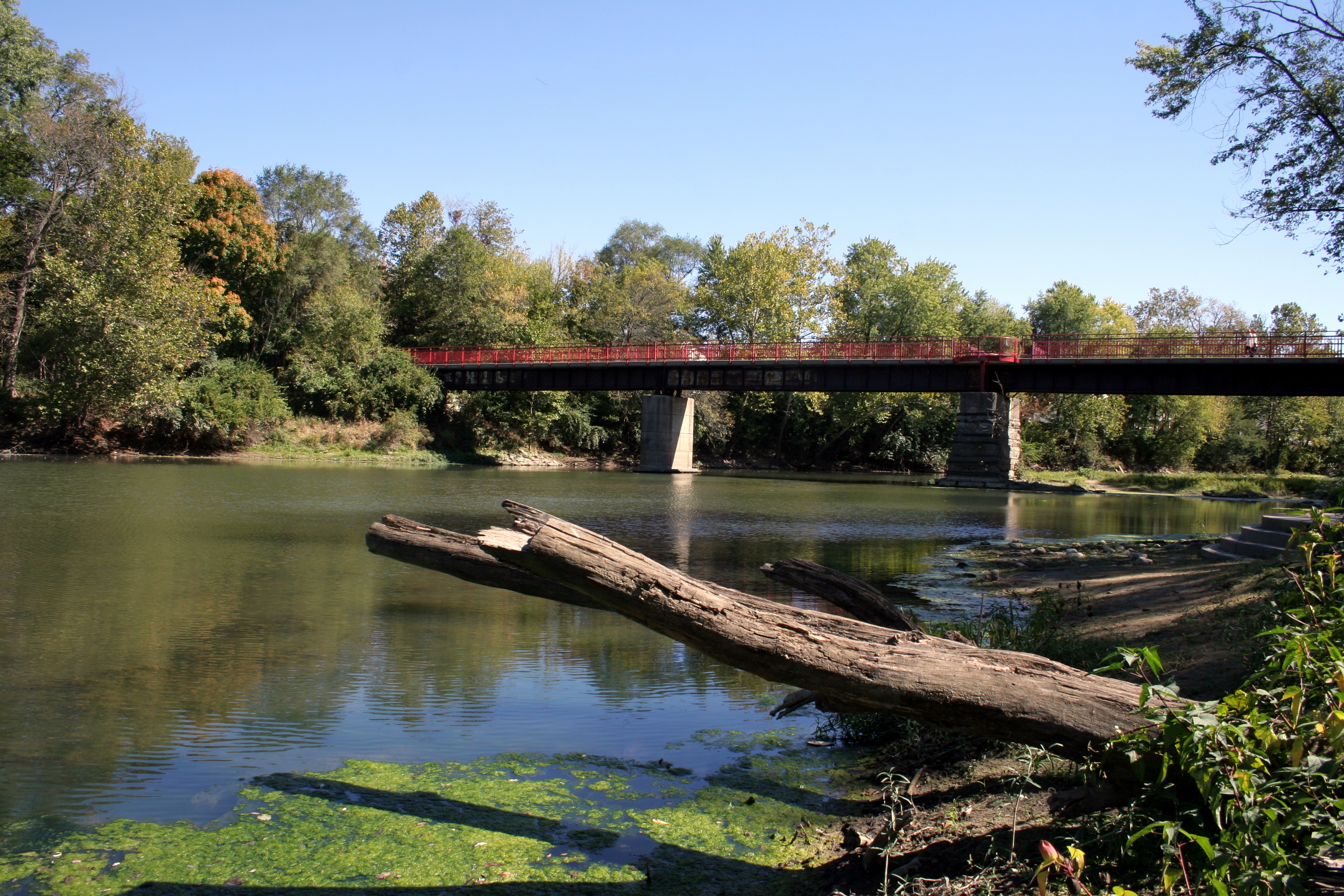
Monon Trail bridge over the White River, viewed from ArtsPark in 2010.

Opened in 2005, ArtsPark is a 12.5-acre (51,000 m^{2}) sculpture garden designed by Michael Graves and connected to the Monon Trail and with public access to the White River. With a goal to bring "art, artists, and the community together through multi-sensory sculptures in an open-air setting," the park serves as a gallery without walls and a space for creating art outside. Features of ArtsPark include the Nina Mason Pulliam Sensory Path, an amphitheater, a riverfront deck, and over 30 public artworks.

The concept for ArtsPark formed in 1996 upon the completion of the Grave's designed building. Funds began to be raised in the early 2000s (decade) and, by 2003, the center had raised $2.6 million, with a goal of $5.5 million. Groundbreaking took place for the park the first weekend of June, during the celebration of the 70th birthday of the IAC, A special groundbreaking took place that Friday at the Indiana School for the Blind and Visually Impaired to celebrate an area of the ArtsPark dedicated to the students, which would feature the artwork Circle created by artist Sadashi Inuzuka and students from the school. The park features artworks by Gary Freeman, Robert Stackhouse, Truman Lowe, Arnaldo Pomodoro, John Spaulding, among others.

== Administration ==
The Indianapolis Art Center is a 501(c)(3) nonprofit directed by Patrick Flaherty and as of 2009 consists of 32 staff members and 616 volunteers. IAC is governed by a board of 36 individuals and is led by Board Chair Marnie Maxwell. Board members represent a variety of regional organizations including Indiana University, Eli Lilly and Company, Fifth Third Bank, IUPUI, KeyBank, as well as former chief executive Joyce Sommers. The Art Center's endowment consists of nine individual funds and entrance is free to the Center and grounds.

== Outreach ==
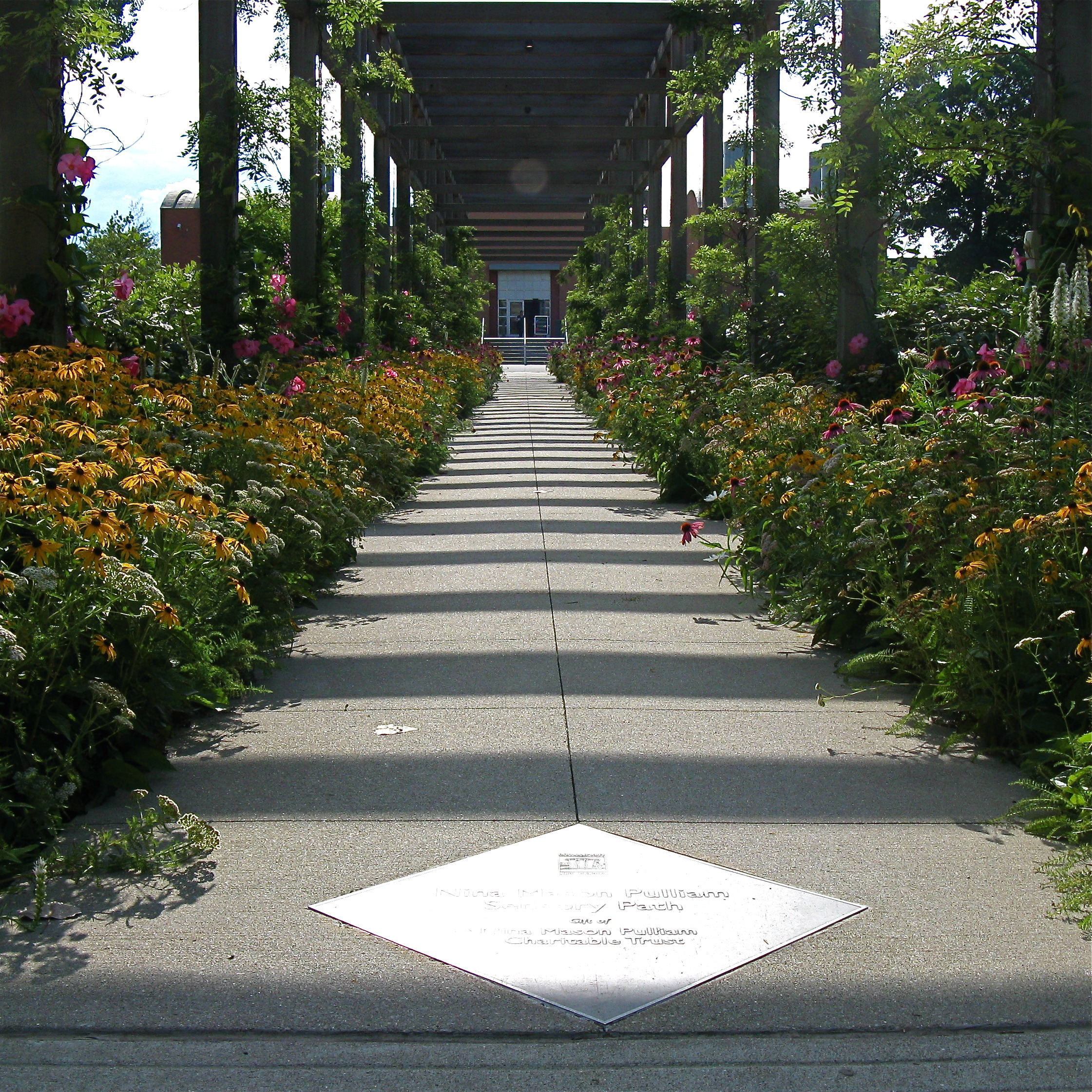
The Nina Mason Pulliam Sensory Path leading to the East entrance

From the 1950s into the 1980s IAC provided outreach programming for prisons and mental health programs, sending volunteers to teach art classes to those imprisoned and suffering from mental disabilities. The center began working with the city to create murals at public housing sites, creating art experiences for 10 housing sites, as well as the Indiana School for the Blind and Visually Impaired and St. Vincent New Hope.

In 1989 the Art Center started its ArtReach program which strives to bring art awareness to youth at risk. ArtReach programming provides young people with two hours of weekly art training, visits to the ARTSPARK for exploration of the art and grounds, and an opportunity to participate in the Michael Carroll ArtReach Exhibition in the Spring, allowing the students to have their artwork professionally exhibited at the center. On the success of the program, former director Joyce Sommers states: "It's not over dramatic to say that art has helped so many kids find a way to find faith in themselves ... when they start making art they are looking inside of themselves and they end up with a product and their self esteem builds. We use the instrument of art for that, besides its intrinsic value." In 2009 IAC introduced The American Scene, which during its inaugural year hosted 56 youth ages 5–18. The American Scene encourages young people to make an impact within their community with public art. Students work with a professional artist to select the location for the artwork, and collaborate with each other and the artist to create a themed artwork relating to Indianapolis. The American Scene ended with artwork made by the children and individuals of the Wheeler Mission being exhibited at the "Beyond Perceptions" exhibition. The SMART program allows 14 young people and their mentors to attend 16 class sessions, three workshops and field trips in the summer.

== Events ==
IAC hosts a number of events to fundraising purposes with the most notable being the Broad Ripple Art Fair. Major indoor events and lectures take place at the facilities Frank M. Basile Auditorium. IAC's summer gala fundraiser is ArtSparkle, which hosts upwards of 400 people, benefiting the center's educational programming. Film series are also part of event programming, taking place within the Basile Auditorium. In 2008 the IAC hosted the Klipsch Chinese Film Festival.

=== Broad Ripple Art Fair ===
Every year the IAC hosts over 22,000 visitors for the Broad Ripple Art Fair. Started in 1971, the first "art fair" was held in a private home, then the streets of Broad Ripple; the IAC directly benefits from the admission fee paid by guests. The festival features over 225 juried artists and craftspeople from the United States and Canada, live music, children's activities and food.

=== Day of the Dead ===
From 2000 to 2012, the Art Center marked the annual Day of the Dead (also known as All Saints Day) on November 1 to celebrate the growing Latino ethnic population in Indianapolis. Through bringing people of different backgrounds together, the Art Center seeks to share the historical, artistic and cultural experiences of the holiday to the city. A major exhibition of altars and shrines took place, Latino artists are exhibited, and workshops and a celebration are featured. After hosting the 2011 exhibition, the Indianapolis Art Center turned the festivities over the Indiana State Museum.

== See also ==
- Harrison Center
- List of attractions and events in Indianapolis
