= Indiana School for the Blind and Visually Impaired =

Coordinates: 39.895079°N 86.144521°W

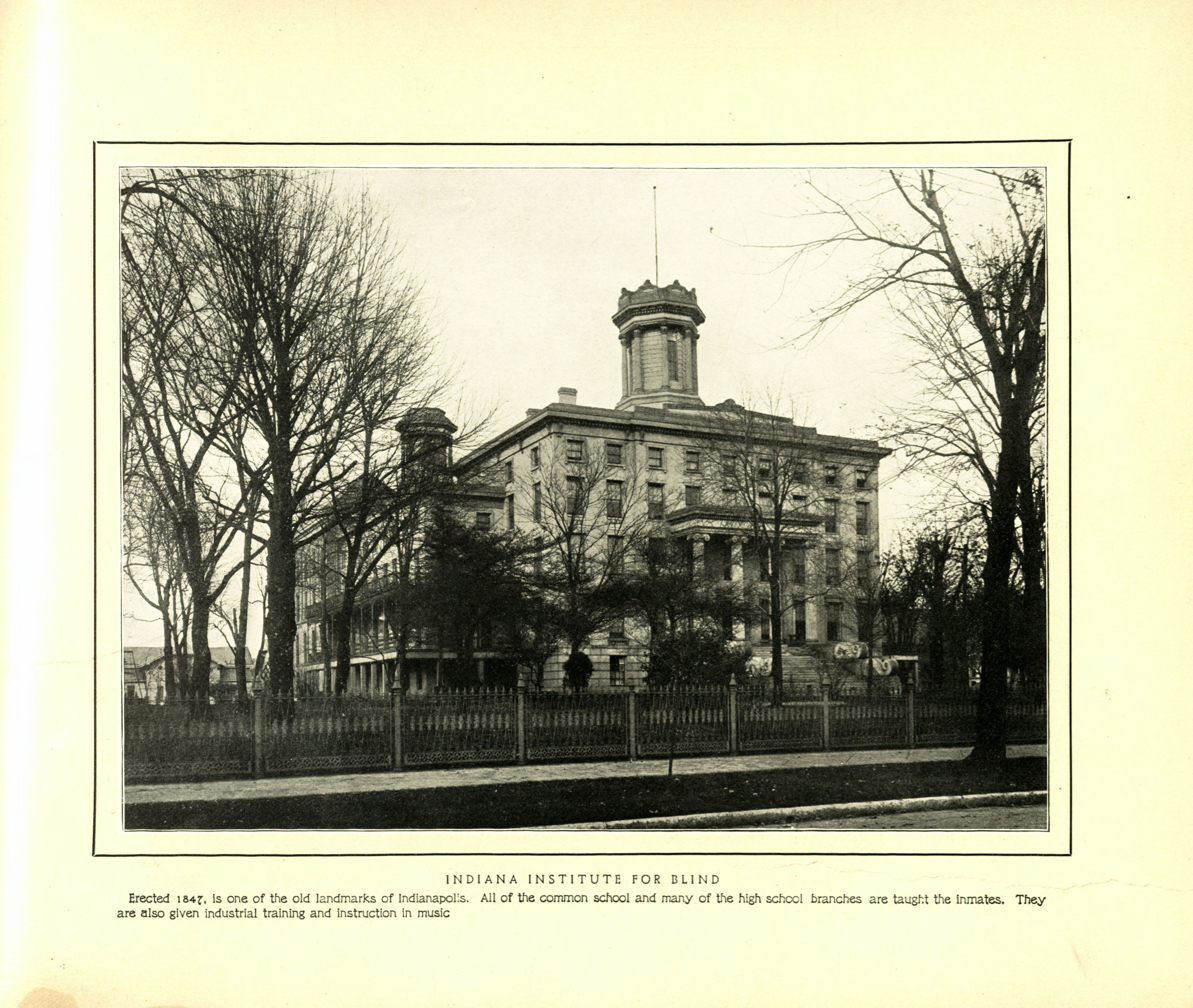
Indiana Institute for the Blind, circa 1904

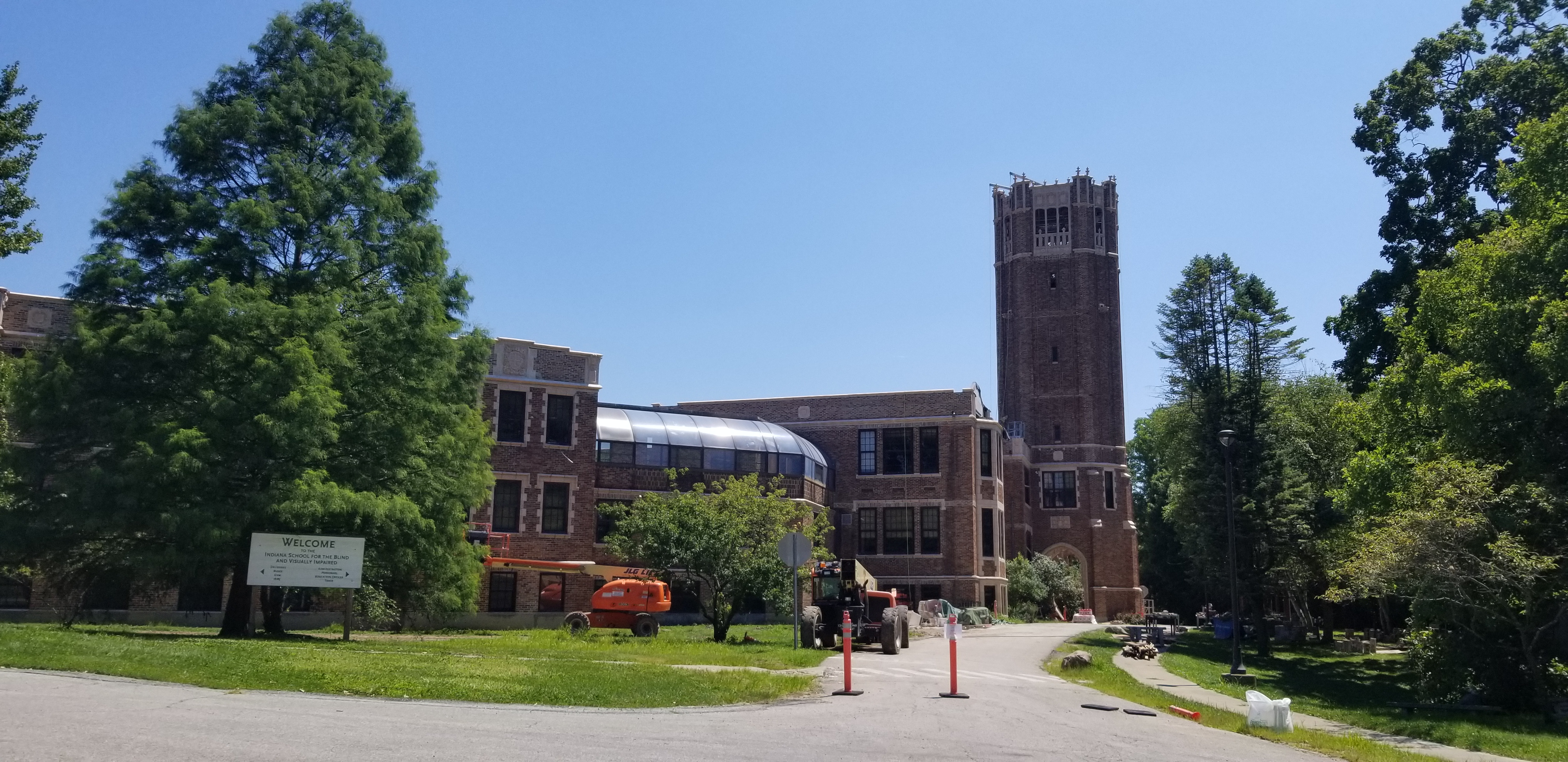
Indiana School for the Blind and Visually Impaired as it appeared in August 2020, with construction work ongoing

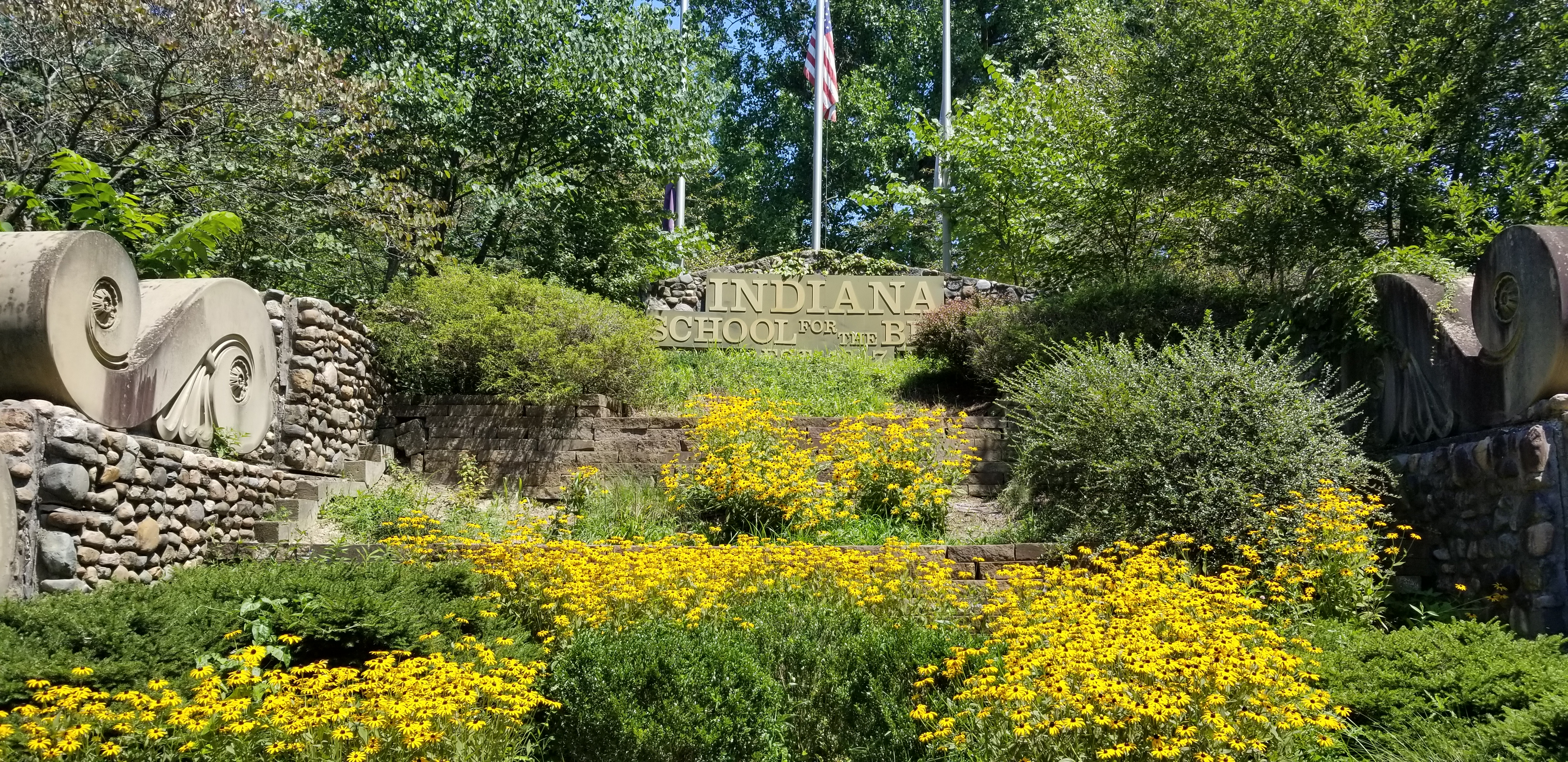
A view of the sign in front of the Indiana School for the Blind and Visually Impaired

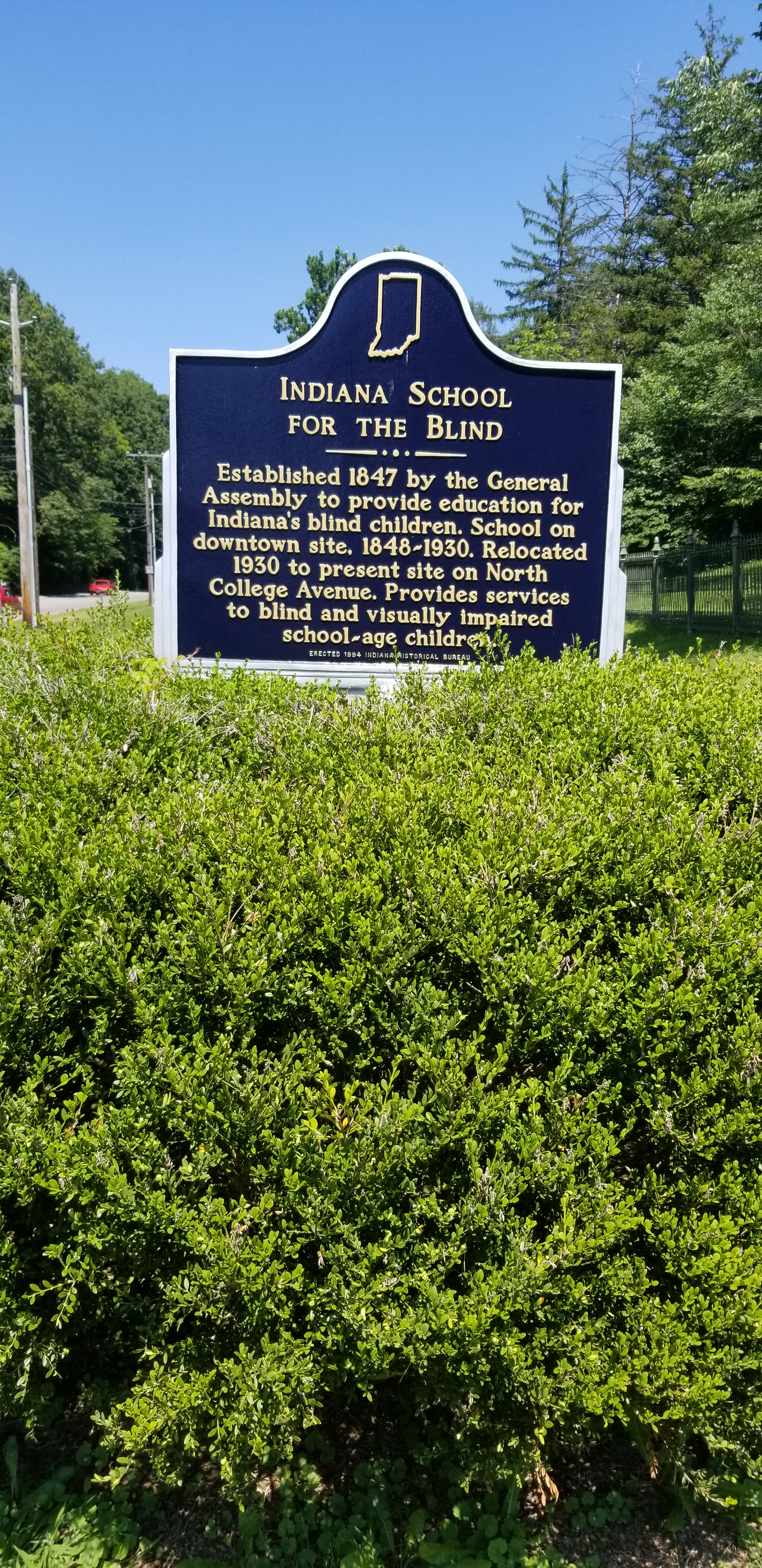
Historical marker discussing Indiana School for the Blind

Indiana School for the Blind and Visually Impaired, or ISBVI, established in 1847 as the Indiana School for the Blind and also known as the Indiana Institution for the Education of the Blind, is a residential school for Indiana youth that are blind or have low vision in Indianapolis, Indiana, United States.

In 1930, the school was relocated to its present location at 7725 North College Avenue in Indianapolis. The school added the "and Visually Impaired" to its name in 2007 and continues to use it today, despite "students who are blind or have low vision" being the currently accepted term.

Students are able to attend the school from pre-school to high school, up to age 22. The total enrollment has exceeded 150 students; there are also an equal number of educators, maintenance, outreach, administrators, and residential staff.

The Lions Clubs of Indiana support the institution as one of their state projects through monetary donations and volunteerism. ISBVI has a youth Lions Club called the Indiana School for the Blind and Visually Impaired Leo Club.

The school's colors are green and white and their mascot is the rocket. They play sports such as swimming, cheerleading, wrestling, goalball, and track and field.

== Campus ==
The school has a dormitory.

== See also ==
- Indianapolis Art Center created a section of their ARTSPARK for students at ISBVI
- Circle, a sculpture created by the visually impaired artist Sadashi Inuzuki with the school's students
- List of schools in Indianapolis
- List of schools for the deaf
