= Full Circle =

Full Circle may refer to:

== Geometry ==
- Full circle (unit), a unit of plane angle

== Books ==
- Full Circle, a 1962 novel by Grace Lumpkin
- Full Circle, a 1982 memoir by Janet Baker
- Full Circle (novel), 1984, by Danielle Steel
- Full Circle: The Moral Force of Unified Science, 1972, co-written and edited by Edward Haskell
- Full Circle (travel book), a 1997 companion book to the travel TV series, by Michael Palin
- Batman: Full Circle, a comic book
- Full Circle Magazine, a free-distribution on-line Ubuntu PDF magazine launched in 2007

== Film, television and theatre ==
=== Films ===
- Full Circle (1935 film), a British film starring Garry Marsh
- Full Circle (1977 film) (also known as The Haunting of Julia), starring Mia Farrow
- Full Circle (1993 film), a Canadian documentary
- Full Circle (1996 film), a Cirque du Soleil documentary
- Full Circle, a 1996 TV film adapted from the novel Full Circle by Danielle Steel
- Full Circle (2008 film), a documentary about an Israeli submarine
- Full Circle, a 2012 Chinese film directed by Zhang Yang

=== Television ===
==== Episodes ====
- "Full Circle", Blue Heelers season 6, episode 23 (1999)
- "Full Circle", Boon series 1, episode 13 (1986)
- "Full Circle", Carrier episode 10 (2008)
- "Full Circle", Children of the Stones episode 7 (1977)
- "Full Circle", Dallas (1978) season 4, episode 22 (1981)
- "Full Circle", Dan Dare: Pilot of the Future episodes 13–14 (2002)
- "Full Circle", Dark Oracle season 1, episode 13 (2005)
- "Full Circle", Dixon of Dock Green series 20, episode 7 (1974)
- "Full Circle" (Doctor Who) (1980)
- "Full Circle", Empire (2015) season 4, episode 2 (2017)
- "Full Circle", Have Gun – Will Travel season 3, episode 34 (1960)
- "Full Circle", Heartbeat series 9, episode 14 (1999)
- "Full Circle", Hercules: The Legendary Journeys season 6, episode 8 (1999)
- "Full Circle", Holby City series 6, episode 11 (2003)
- "Full Circle", Kung Fu season 3, episode 21 (1975)
- "Full Circle", Lassie (1997) season 2, episode 5 (1998)
- "Full Circle", Law of the Plainsman episode 2 (1959)
- "Full Circle", Lenox Hill episode 8 (2020)
- "Full Circle", Love & Hip Hop: Miami season 3, episode 12 (2020)
- "Full Circle", Lovecraft Country episode 10 (2020)
- "Full Circle", Murphy Brown season 4, episode 6 (1991)
- "Full Circle", Princess Gwenevere and the Jewel Riders season 1, episode 13 (1995)
- "Full Circle" (Stargate SG-1) (2002)
- "Full Circle", State Trooper season 2, episode 11 (1958)
- "Full Circle", Straightaway episode 23 (1962)
- "Full Circle", The Brothers (1972) series 1, episode 10 (1972)
- "Full Circle", The Champions episode 26 (1969)
- "Full Circle", The Fenn Street Gang series 3, episode 8 (1973)
- "Full Circle", The Grinder episode 22 (2016)
- "Full Circle", The Guard season 3, episode 8 (2009)
- "Full Circle", Touched by an Angel season 5, episode 22 (1999)
- "Full Circle" (Yellowjackets) (2025)
- "The Full Circle", Life Story special (2015)
- "The Full Circle", a Space: 1999 episode (1975)
- "The Full Circle", Survivor: Winners at War episode 10 (2020)

==== Shows ====
- Full Circle (1960 TV series), a short-lived daytime TV serial starring Dyan Cannon and Jean Byron
- Full Circle (2013 TV series), by Audience Network
- Full Circle with Michael Palin, a 1997 travel TV series
- ESPN Full Circle, a televised sports event
- Full Circle (miniseries), a 2023 American television miniseries

=== Plays ===
- Full Circle (Melville play), 1953, by Alan Melville
- Full Circle, 1956, by Erich Maria Remarque
- Full Circle, 1998, by Charles L. Mee

== Music ==
=== Albums ===
- Full Circle (Loretta Lynn album), 2016, by Loretta Lynn
- Full Circle (David Benoit album), 2006, by David Benoit
- Full Circle (Boyz II Men album), 2002, by Boyz II Men
- Full Circle (Chillinit album), 2020, by Chillinit
- Full Circle (Creed album), 2009, by Creed
- Full Circle (CTA album), 2007, by CTA
- Full Circle (Holger Czukay, Jah Wobble and Jaki Liebezeit album), 1982, by Holger Czukay, Jah Wobble and Jaki Liebezeit
- Full Circle (Barbara Dickson album), 2004, by Barbara Dickson
- Full Circle (The Doors album), 1972, by The Doors
- Full Circle (Dixie Dregs album), 1994, by Dixie Dregs
- Full Circle (Drowning Pool album), 2007, by Drowning Pool
- Full Circle (Eddie Palmieri album), 2018, by Eddie Palmieri
- Full Circle (FireHouse album), 2011, by FireHouse
- Full Circle (Hieroglyphics album), 2003 album and title track by Hieroglyphics
- Full Circle (Icehouse album), 1994, by Icehouse
- Full Circle (Waylon Jennings album), 1988, by Waylon Jennings
- Full Circle (Jim Jidhed album), 2003, by Jim Jidhed and Tommy Denander
- Full Circle (Morgan Heritage album), 2005, by Morgan Heritage
- Full Circle (Oliver album), 2017, by Oliver
- Full Circle (Pennywise album), 1997, by Pennywise
- Full Circle (The Quill album), 2011, by The Quill
- Full Circle (Jimmie Ross album), 2010, by Jimmie Ross
- Full Circle (Saga album), 1999, by Saga
- Full Circle (Ravi Shankar album), 2001, by Ravi Shankar
- Full Circle (Shigeto album), 2010
- Full Circle (Leon Thomas album), 1973, by Leon Thomas
- Full Circle (Randy Travis album), 1996, by Randy Travis
- Full Circle (Walter Trout album), 2006
- Full Circle (Dottie West album), 1982, by Dottie West
- Full Circle (Xzibit album), 2006, by Xzibit
- Full Circle, 2025, by 98 Degrees
- Full Circle, 2005, by Birtles Shorrock Goble
- Full Circle, 2004, by Charlie Peacock
- Full Circle, a 1997 soundtrack album by Colin Towns
- Full Circle, 2003, by Dan Fogelberg
- Full Circle, 2003, by Dave Sinclair
- Full Circle, 1998, by DJ Dara
- Full Circle, 2018, by Eddie Palmieri
- Full Circle, 1970, by Forest
- Full Circle, 1986, by Frank Marino
- Full Circle, 2016, by Hælos
- Full Circle, 1968, by Ian & Sylvia
- Full Circle, 2003, by Holly Dunn
- Full Circle, 1981, by Rupert Holmes

=== Songs ===
- "Full Circle", by Five Finger Death Punch from F8
- "Full Circle", by Aerosmith on Nine Lives
- "Full Circle", by Company B on Company B
- "Full Circle", by Miley Cyrus on Breakout
- "Full Circle", by Half Moon Run on Dark Eyes
- "Full Circle", by Loreena McKennitt on The Mask and Mirror
- "Full Circle", by No Doubt on Everything in Time
- "Full Circle", a movement from the song "Octavarium" by Dream Theater
- "Full Circle Song" (aka "Full Circle"), 1973, by Gene Clark on the albums Roadmaster and Byrds
- "Full Circle", by Xavier Rudd on Spirit Bird
- "Full Circle", by Tenelle which represented American Samoa in the American Song Contest

=== Other uses in music ===
- Full circle ringing, a method of hanging (church) bells and ringing them in the "English tradition"
- Full Circle (group), a hip hop combined supergroup of Halal Gang and Prime Boys

== Other ==
- Full Circle, a studio established by Electronic Arts known for their work on the upcoming Skate video game sequel
- Full Circle, a global circumnavigation research and exploration project led by sailor Alan Priddy
