= Vicious Cycle =

Vicious Cycle may refer to:

- Vicious Cycle (album), a 2003 album by Lynyrd Skynyrd
- A Vicious Cycle, a 2008 album by Reef the Lost Cauze
- Vicious Cycle Software, a video game development company
- Virtuous circle and vicious circle, or vicious cycle, a complex of events that reinforces itself through a feedback loop
