= The Circle (sect) =

Sect

- Cercul
- Formation: 2008
- Founder: Eusebiu Sebastian Apostolache
- Type: Sect / criminal organization
- Location: Târgu Mureș, Romania

The Circle (Cercul) was a sect from Târgu Mureș, Romania. It was created in 2008 by "guru" Eusebiu Sebastian Apostolache. For eight years, he sexually exploited several young women, as well as minor girls. Most of the young women were students at the University of Arts Târgu Mureș.

The leader told them that he was in permanent contact with a higher spiritual being, called Chekhov1, the first of God's angels.

The leader was sentenced to nine years in prison for human trafficking, forming an organized criminal group, minors trafficking, and sexual intercourse with a minor on a continuous basis.
