= EE Technologies =

EE Technologies, Inc.
- Company type: Private
- Industry: Electronic Contract Manufacturing
- Founded: 1995
- Headquarters: Reno, Nevada
- Key people: Sonny Newman (CEO)
- Products: Computing, communications, aerospace and defence, consumer, industrial, automotive electronics
- Number of employees: 300+ (2018)
- Website: www.eetechinc.com

Electronic Evolution Technologies, Inc. (also referred to as EE Technologies, Inc or EET) is a multi-national electronic manufacturing services (EMS) company headquartered in Reno, Nevada. EET provides full electronic and mechanical box build assembly services and also specializes in circuit board assembly for a variety of markets, including the automotive, medical, military and digital audio/video markets. The company operates a global manufacturing network with operations in the Americas and Mexico, providing services to original equipment manufacturers. EET was recognized as one of the top 20 contract manufacturers in the western United States in 2007.

== History ==
EE Technologies, Inc. was incorporated as Meridian Electronics in 1994. By 1999 Meridian Electronics had grown to $28 million a year in revenue. EE Technologies was spun off from Meridian Electronics in March 2000. In October 2000, the company moved into a new facility in South Reno, Nevada. In December 2002, the company expanded their facilities by 25,000 sq ft (2,300 m^{2}). Currently the company employs over 180 people with facilities in the US and Mexico. EE Technologies, Inc recently settled a lawsuit with the Environmental Protection Agency for $80,000 over them failing to file required reports on toxic chemicals.

== Operations ==
EE Technologies, Inc's manufacturing network comprises locations in the Americas and Mexico. The company's services include design, engineering, manufacturing and systems assembly, fulfillment and after-market services.

== Mexico Facility ==
In October 2005, EE Technologies, Inc expanded further with the opening of a facility in Empalme, Sonora, Mexico. The equipment, process, and training in the Mexico facility mirror the operations in Reno, Nevada. Both facilities are ISO/TS 16949:2002 certified.
