= Ellen Goldring =

Ellen Goldring is a professor of Educational Policy and Leadership at Vanderbilt University.

== Biography ==
Ellen Goldring received a Ph.D. from the University of Chicago in 1985. Her research interests reside in two main areas. One strand centers on understanding and shaping school reform efforts that connect families, communities, and schools. She is co-author of Magnet Schools in Urban Districts: What's Our Choice (Teacher College Press), with Claire Smrekar, that focuses on questions of equity and community in urban school districts with extensive magnet school plans, and Principals of Dynamic Schools (Corwin Press) with Sharon Rallis.

Much of her other work focuses on the changing role of school leaders as the organizational contexts for schools become more complex and varied. Her research examines how principals play a pivotal and changing role as schools become re-embedded in their larger community structures. She studies the organizational features of schools and leadership that affect parent participation and teaches undergraduate and graduate courses in the areas of understanding organizations and quantitative research methods. She is currently involved in a number of projects that are studying expertise in school leadership, new models for professional development for school leaders, and linking leading and learning.

== Appointments and memberships ==
- Co-Editor, Educational Evaluation and Policy Analysis, 2003-2006.
- Member, Task Force on Developing Research to Improve Educational Leadership; Division American Educational Research Association, The Laboratory for Student Success, and the University Council for School Administration.

== Current work ==
Ellen Goldring is currently involved on the following projects;

- Reclaiming Communities: Diversity, Equity, and Access in the Post-Busing Era: A longitudinal study of the transition from court-ordered busing to unitary status funded by the WT Grant Foundation.
- The Institute for School Leadership: A study of the impact of multimedia case based professional development for school leaders funded by the Gates Foundation and the Learning Sciences Institute, Vanderbilt University.
- Parental Involvement and Parent Choice: A study of the new roles for magnet schools with race neutral enrollment rules.

== Bibliography ==
- Goldring, E., & Rallis, S. (2000). Principals of Dynamic Schools: Taking Charge of Change (2nd ed.). Newbury Park, CA: Corwin/Sage.
- Smrekar, C., & Goldring, E. (1999). School Choice in Urban America: Magnet Schools and the Pursuit of Equity. New York: Teachers College Press.
- Goldring, E., & Smrekar, C. (2000). Magnet schools and the pursuit of racial balance. Education and Urban Society, 33(1), 17-35.
- Goldring, E. & Greenfield, W. (2002). Understanding the evolving concept of leadership in education: Roles, expectations and dilemmas. In J. Murphy (ed.) The Educational Leadership Challenge: Redefining Leadership in the 21st Century, NSSE Yearbook. Chicago: University of Chicago Press. ?.
- Goldring, E., & Hausman, C. (2001). Civic capacity and school principals: The missing link in community development. In R. Crowson & B. Boyd (Eds.), Community Development and School Reform. Greenwich, CT: JAI Press.
- Hausman, C., & Goldring, E. (2000). School community in different magnet program structures. School Effectiveness and School Improvement, 11(1), 80-102.
- Goldring, E., & Hausman, C. (1999). Reasons for parental choice in urban schools. Journal of Education Policy, 4(5), 469-490.
- Bauch, P., & Goldring, E. (1998). Parent-teacher participation in the context of school restructuring. Peabody Journal of Education, 73, 15-35.
- Bauch, P., & Goldring, E. (1995). Parent involvement and school responsiveness: Facilitating the home-school connection in schools of choice. Educational Evaluation and Policy Analysis, 17(1), 1-22.
