= Mount Goldring =

Mountain in Graham Land, Antarctica

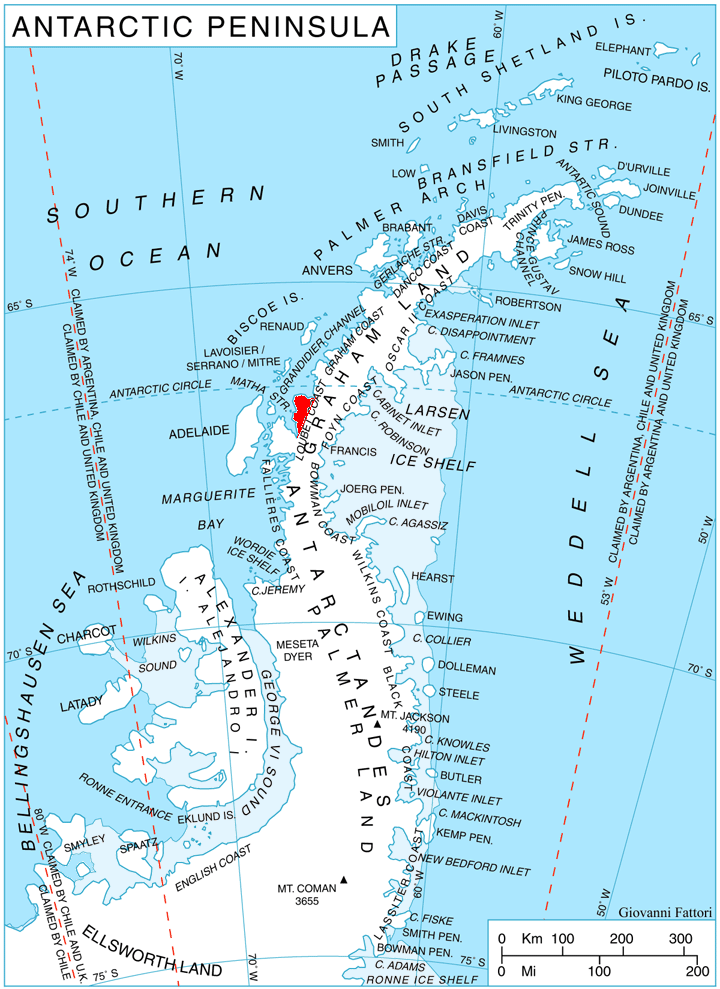
Location of Pernik Peninsula on Loubet Coast, Antarctic Peninsula.

Mount Goldring (66°57′S 66°1′W) is a peak on Pernik Peninsula, Loubet Coast, situated on the north side of Murphy Glacier, to the east of Lallemand Fjord in Graham Land, Antarctica. It was mapped from air photos obtained by the Falkland Islands and Dependencies Aerial Survey Expedition, 1956–57, and was named by the UK Antarctic Place-Names Committee for Denis Goldring, a Falkland Islands Dependencies Survey geologist at nearby Detaille Island, 1957–59.
