= The Circle (file system) =

Peer-to-peer distributed file system

The Circle is a peer-to-peer distributed file system written mainly in Python. It is based on the Chord distributed hash table (DHT).

Development on the Circle was ceased in 2004.

== Features ==
It supports file sharing, instant messaging with buddy lists, the Internet Relay Chat model of sending a message to a channel, and a personalized, trust-based news service.

More unusually, it supports:

- finding and sending messages to people who aren't currently online;
- a proxy for the Debian Advanced Packaging Tool system; and
- a probabilistic mechanism for sharing common keys between nodes, something not present in all DHT implementations.

== Details ==
Its DHT implementation is vulnerable to denial of service attacks.

From The Circle homepage:

The Circle is a scalable decentralized peer-to-peer application.... There's no central authority running the show. Which means no entry taxes, no one booting you off the network, and (in theory) no weak point which can break the whole system. As long is there's one Circle peer running, anywhere in the world, there's still a network. Circle does not try to provide anonymity, which allows it to be much more scalable than gnutella.

The Circle currently runs on Linux, BSD, Windows, and Mac OS X.
