= Golden Ring Hotel =

Hotel in Moscow, Russia

Coordinates: 55°44′43″N 37°34′49″E

The hotel from outside

Golden Ring Hotel (Russian: Гостиница Золотое Кольцо) is a hotel in Moscow. The hotel is located just opposite the Ministry of Foreign Affairs Building and the Arbat Street, on Smolenskaya Ulitsa.

== History ==
The hotel was built in 1974 as the Belgrade-I Hotel and used to serve foreign tourists (mostly from the Eastern bloc countries) who visited Russia with Intourist groups.
