= Magic circle (disambiguation) =

A magic circle is a ritually defined space in a number of magical traditions.

Magic circle or Magic Circle may also refer to:

- Magic circle (mathematics), an arrangement of natural numbers on circles such that the sum of the numbers on each circle and the sum of numbers on each diameter are identical
- Magic circle (games), a concept used in sociology and psychology
- Magic Circle (law firms), a group of leading London law firms
  - Offshore magic circle, a group of law firms practicing in offshore jurisdictions
- The Magic Circle (organisation), a British organisation dedicated to stage magic
- Magic Circle (album), a 2005 album by Wizard
- The Magic Circle (Waterhouse paintings), two 1886 paintings by John William Waterhouse
- The Magic Circle (video game)
- Magic Circle Music, a record label founded by Manowar's bassist Joey DeMaio in 2003
- Magic Circle Festival, a music festival founded in 2007 by Joey DeMaio, headlined by Manowar
- Sala gang or Den Magiska Cirkeln, a 1930s Swedish criminal and occult organization
- The Magic Circle, a 1993 novel by Donna Jo Napoli

== See also ==
- Circle of Magic, a series of fantasy novels by Tamora Pierce
