= List of artworks at the Indianapolis Museum of Art =

This is a list of some of the most significant artworks at the Indianapolis Museum of Art (IMA). The museum's collection has always been very strong in 19th-century European and American paintings, particularly Neo-Impressionism, and textiles. Generous donations helped the IMA develop impressive holdings in modernist, African, and Asian art. Recently, the IMA has begun to focus on developing its collections of contemporary art and design.

Image	Title	Artist	Place of origin	Year	Material	Dimensions (inches)	Accession number	IMA page
	Sunlight	Frank W. Benson	America	1909	Oil paint, Canvas	32 x 20	11.1	Sunlight
	Breton Women at a Wall	Émile Bernard	France	1892	Oil paint, Cardboard	32.875 x 45.5	1998.172	Breton Women at a Wall
	Tidying Up	Isabel Bishop	America	1941	Oil paint, Masonite	15 x 11.5	43.24	Tidying Up
	Morning at Grand Manan	Alfred Thompson Bricher	America	1878	Oil paint, Canvas	25 x 50	70.65	Morning at Grand Manan
	The Negress	Jean-Baptiste Carpeaux	France	1868	Bronze	22.375	80.202	The Negress
	House in Provence	Paul Cézanne	France	c1885	Oil paint, Canvas	25.5 x 32	45.194	House in Provence
	Dorothy	William Merritt Chase	America	1902	Oil paint, Canvas	72 x 36	03.4	Dorothy
	Blasting St. Vincent's Rock, Clifton	John Sell Cotman	England	1830	Watercolor, Gum arabic, Pencil, Paper	13.5 x 22.75	1999.32	Blasting St. Vincent's Rock, Clifton
	The Crucifixion	Lucas Cranach the Elder	Germany	1532	Oil paint, Wood	30 x 21.5	2000.344	The Crucifixion
	Chinese Souls#2	Nancy Crow	America	1992	Resist dyed fabric	81 x 89	1996.249	Chinese Souls #2
	The Valkhof at Nijmegen	Aelbert Cuyp	Netherlands	1652–4	Oil paint, Wood	19.25 x 29	43.107	The Valkhof at Nijmegen
	Young Woman in Blue	Edgar Degas	France	1882–5	Pastel, Paper	18.5 x 12.25	38.12	Young Woman in Blue
	Evening dress	Christian Dior	France	1956	Silk chiffon	36	2002.143	Evening dress
	Reflections	Arthur Garfield Dove	America	1935	Oil paint, Canvas	15.125 x 21.0625	2003.161	Reflections
	Courre Merlan (Whiting Chase)	Jean Dubuffet	France	1964	Oil paint, Canvas	38.25 x 51	1992.394	Courre Merlan (Whiting Chase)
	The Holy Family with the Dragonfly	Albrecht Dürer	Germany	1495	Engraving	9.375 x 7.25	58.4	The Holy Family with the Dragonfly
	Entry of Christ into Jerusalem	Anthony van Dyck	Flanders	1617	Oil paint, Canvas	59.5 x 90.25	58.3	Entry of Christ into Jerusalem
	Palace plaque depicting warrior	Edo people	Africa	1500–1700	Brass	21.125 x 14.75 x 3	1989.845	Palace plaque depicting warrior
	Galinthias Outwits Eileithyia by Announcing the Birth of Heracles / Portrait of Mrs. Fuseli	Henry Fuseli	Switzerland	1791	Graphite, Ink, Paper	12.25 x 15.625	1993.172	Galinthias Outwits Eileithyia by Announcing the Birth of Heracles
	The Flageolet Player on the Cliff	Paul Gauguin	France	1889	Oil paint, Canvas	27.9375 x 35.9375	1998.168	The Flageolet Player on the Cliff
	Landscape near Arles	Paul Gauguin	France	1888	Oil paint, Canvas	36 x 28.5	44.10	Landscape near Arles
	Still Life with Profile of Laval	Paul Gauguin	France	1886	Oil paint, Canvas	18.125 x 15	1998.167	Still Life with Profile of Laval
	Enclosed Field with Peasant	Vincent van Gogh	Netherlands	1889	Oil paint, Canvas	29 x 36.25	44.74	Enclosed Field with Peasant
	U.S.A.	John Haberle	America	1889	Oil paint, Canvas	8.5 x 12	2002.225	U.S.A.
	Haida ceremonial dance rattle	Haida people	Canada	1850–80	Wood, Pigment	12.625 x 3.75 x 3.75	30.550	Ceremonial dance rattle
	Cliff Rock--Appledore	Childe Hassam	America	1903	Oil paint, Canvas	29 x 36	07.1	Cliff Rock--Appledore
	Fine Wind, Clear Morning	Katsushika Hokusai	Japan	1829–33	Wood block print	10.125 x 15	60.12	Fine Wind, Clear Morning
	The Boat Builders	Winslow Homer	America	1873	Oil paint, Wood	6 x 10.25	54.10	The Boat Builders
	Hotel Lobby	Edward Hopper	America	1943	Oil paint, Canvas	32.25 x 40.75	47.4	Hotel Lobby
	LOVE (sculpture)	Robert Indiana	America	1970	Cor-ten steel	144 x 144 x 72	75.174	LOVE
	LOVE (painting)	Robert Indiana	America	1966	Oil paint, Canvas	71.875 x 71.875	67.8	LOVE
	The Rainbow	George Inness	America	1878–9	Oil paint, Canvas	30 x 45	44.137	The Rainbow
	Untitled	Robert Irwin	America	1968–9	Lacquer, Cast acrylic, Tungsten lights	54	1988.220	Untitled
	Untitled	Donald Judd	America	1967	Brass, Enamel, Cold rolled steel	6.125 x 138 x 6	1992.362	Untitled
	Still Life with a Chinese Porcelain Jar	Willem Kalf	Netherlands	1669	Oil paint, Canvas	30.75 x 26	45.9	Still Life with a Chinese Porcelain Jar
	Guardian figure	Kota people	Africa	1880–1920	Wood, Copper, Brass, Iron	15.5 x 7 x 4	1991.292	Guardian figure
	Vorhor, the Green Wave	Georges Lacombe	France	1896–7	Egg tempera, Canvas	39.375 x 28.375	1984.202	Vorhor, The Green Wave
	Madonna and Child with St. John the Baptist and St. Mary Magdalene	Neroccio di Bartolomeo de' Landi	Italy	1495	Tempera, Wood	28 x 20.125	2004.161	Madonna and Child with St. John the Baptist and St. Mary Magdalene
	Untitled	Ronnie Landfield	American	1998	acrylic, Paper	29.75 x 22.75	2008.299	Untitled
	Untitled (The Birth)	Jacob Lawrence	America	1938	Tempera, Paper	12.875 x 11.625	1997.130	Untitled (The Birth)
	Man and Woman	Fernand Léger	France	1921	Oil paint, Canvas	36.25 x 25.5	52.28	Man and Woman
	The Two Sisters	Georges Lemmen	Belgium	1894	Oil paint, Canvas	23.625 x 27.5625	79.317	The Two Sisters or The Serruys Sisters
	The Flight into Egypt	Claude Lorrain	France	c1635	Oil paint, Canvas	28 x 38.5	2003.171	The Flight into Egypt
	The Flight of Europa	Paul Manship	America	1925	Bronze, Marble	25 x 30.5 x 8.25	50.30	Flight of Europa
	Rebecca and Eliezer at the Well	Carlo Maratta	Italy	1655–7	Oil paint, Canvas	47 x 62	1988.70	Rebecca and Eliezer at the Well
	Hurricane	John Marin	America	1944	Oil paint, Canvas	25 x 30	61.42	Hurricane
	Afternoon Tea	Richard E. Miller	America	1910	Oil paint, Canvas	39.5 x 32	1997.139	Afternoon Tea
	Peasant with a Wheelbarrow	Jean-François Millet	France	1848–52	Oil paint, Canvas	14.875 x 17.875	49.48	Peasant with a Wheelbarrow
	Crucifixion	Barnaba da Modena	Italy	1375	Tempera, Gold, Wood	41 x 26.5	24.5	Crucifixion
	The Boy	Amedeo Modigliani	Italy	1919	Oil paint, Canvas	36.25 x 23.75	46.22	The Boy
	Battle Between Carnival and Lent	Jan Miense Molenaer	Netherlands	1633–4	Oil paint, Wood	16 x 21.75	1998.96	Battle Between Carnival and Lent
	Charing Cross Bridge	Claude Monet	France	1900	Oil paint, Canvas	26 x 36	65.15	Charing Cross Bridge
	Boreas and Oreithyia	Charles-Joseph Natoire	France	1740	Chalk, Paper	12.375 x 14.75	80.366	Boreas and Oreithyia
	The Holy Family with Saint John the Baptist	Nosadella	Italy	1550–60	Oil paint, Wood	19.5 x 15	66.233	The Holy Family with Saint John the Baptist
	Crucifix	Gaspar Núñez Delgado	Spain	1599	Ivory, Ebony, Mahogany, Silver, Polychromy	26.75 x 14 x 3.25	1995.24	Crucifix
	Jimson Weed	Georgia O'Keeffe	America	1936	Oil paint, Linen	70 x 83.5	1997.131	Jimson Weed
	Magbo helmet mask for Oro society	Onabanjo of Itu Meko	Africa	1880–1920	Wood, Pigment, Iron	28.75 x 13.75 x 18.5	1989.754	Magbo helmet mask for Oro association
	Roman Capriccio: The Pantheon and Other Monuments	Giovanni Paolo Panini	Italy	1735	Oil paint, Canvas	39 x 53.5	50.5	Roman Capriccio: The Pantheon and Other Monuments
	Ma Jolie	Pablo Picasso	Spain	1914	Oil paint, Canvas	21.1875 x 25.625	61.36	Ma Jolie
	The Banks of the Oise near Pontoise	Camille Pissarro	France	1873	Oil paint, Canvas	15 x 22.25	40.252	The Banks of the Oise near Pontoise
	The House of the Deaf Woman and the Belfry at Eragny	Camille Pissarro	France	1886	Oil paint, Canvas	25.625 x 31.875	2002.76	The House of the Deaf Woman and the Belfry at Eragny
	Self-Portrait	Rembrandt van Rijn	Netherlands	1629	Oil paint, Wood	17.5 x 13.5	C10063	Self-Portrait
	Aristotle	Jusepe de Ribera	Spain	1637	Oil paint, Canvas	49 x 39	2000.345	Aristotle
	The Love Song	Norman Rockwell	America	1926	Oil paint, Canvas	38.375 x 42.875	1997.151	The Love Song
	The Triumphant Entry of Constantine into Rome	Peter Paul Rubens	Belgium	1620–2	Oil paint, Wood	19 x 25.5	2001.237	The Triumphant Entry of Constantine into Rome
	Coffee service	Gottfried Schmidt	Austria	1811	Hard-paste porcelain, Polychrome enamels, Gilding, Silvering	16.5	1995.60-.67	Coffee service
	Mother (Mutter)	Karl Schmidt-Rottluff	Germany	1916	Wood block print, Paper	24.5 x 20.25	57.95	Mother (Mutter)
	Senufo female ancestor figure	Senufo people	Africa	1901–1930	Wood	41.625 x 8 x 3.75	1999.31	Female ancestor figure
	The Channel of Gravelines, Petit Fort Philippe	Georges Seurat	France	1890	Oil paint, Canvas	28.875 x 36.5	45.195	The Channel at Gravelines, Petit Fort Philippe
	Red Kimono on the Roof	John Sloan	America	1912	Oil paint, Canvas	24 x 20	54.55	Red Kimono on the Roof
	Egyptian Barnyard	David Smith	America	1954	Wrought and Soldered Silver	14.5 x 24 x 5.5	60.279	Egyptian Barnyard
	Preparing for the Matinee	Edmund Charles Tarbell	America	1907	Oil paint, Canvas	45.5 x 35.5	82.201	Preparing for the Matinee
	Angel of the Resurrection	Tiffany Studios	America	1904	Glass, Lead	348 x 168	72.75	Angel of the Resurrection
	Broek in Waterland	Jan Toorop	Netherlands	1889	Oil paint, Canvas	27 x 30	2000.156	Broek in Waterland
	Moulin Rouge: La Goulue	Henri de Toulouse-Lautrec	France	1891	Lithograph, Paper	66.375 x 46.75	36.4	Moulin Rouge--La Goulue
	The Fifth Plague of Egypt	Joseph Mallord William Turner	England	1800	Oil paint, Canvas	48 x 72	55.24	The Fifth Plague of Egypt
	Acton	James Turrell	America	1976	Tungsten lights, Specially designed room	408 x 252	1989.111	Acton
	Healing of Abiku Children	Twins Seven-Seven	Nigeria	1973	Wood, Pigment	51.375 x 51.5625	1993.82	Healing of Abiku Children
	The Quintet of the Silent	Bill Viola	America	2001	DVD, Panasonic plasma screen, Line doubler, Surge protector, DVD player	24.75 x 40.5 x 7	2001.381A-J	The Quintet of the Silent
	The Seamstress	Édouard Vuillard	France	1892	Oil paint, Cardboard	11 x 10	69.68	The Seamstress
	They Waz Nice White Folks While They Lasted (Sez One Gal to Another)	Kara Walker	America	2001	Cut paper, Overhead projector	168 x 168 x 240	2002.1	They Waz Nice White Folks While They Lasted (Sez One Gal to Another)
	The Country Dance	Jean-Antoine Watteau	France	1706–10	Oil paint, Canvas	19.5 x 23.625	74.98	The Country Dance
	Face mask	We people	Africa	1900–1950	Wood, Pigment, Shells, Cloth, Fiber, Fur, Paper, Metal, Feathers	19 x 13.5 x 11.5	1989.373	Face mask
	Portland vase	Josiah Wedgwood	England	1790	Stoneware	10	1994.2	Portland vase
	Entry of Christ into Jerusalem	Master of Taüll	Spain	1125	Fresco transferred to Canvas	70.25 x 121	57.151	The Entry of Christ into Jerusalem
	Triptych of the Annunciation	Master of the Legend of Saint Ursula	Flanders	1483	Oil paint, Wood	23.25 x 45.75	1997.138	Triptych of the Annunciation
	Eli Lilly Family Quilt		America	1847	Cotton	104.5 x 105	1996.281	Eli Lilly Family Quilt
	High chest of drawers (Indianapolis Museum of Art)	Inspired by Thomas Chippendale	America	1760–80	Walnut, Brass	98 x 43.25 x 22.25	75.99	High chest
	Ritual wine server (guang), Indianapolis Museum of Art, 60.43		China	1200–1100 BCE	Bronze	9	60.43	Ritual wine server
	Vase with carved peony scrolls		China	1000	Cizhou ware	17	47.153	Vase with carved peony scrolls
	Bowl with two violet spots		China	1200	Jun ware	6	47.131	Bowl with two violet spots
	Cong-shaped vase		China	1200	Longquan celadon	16.375	47.154	Cong-shaped vase
	Covered jar with carp design		China	1522–66	Porcelain	18	60.88A-B	Covered jar with carp design
	Vase with nine peach design		China	1736–95	Porcelain, Overglaze enamel	19.5 x 14.5	60.116	Vase with nine peach design
	Side chair	Inspired by Thomas Chippendale	England	1755–65	Mahogany	39.5 x 25 x 21	81.375	Side chair
	Woman's apron		Germany	1760	Silk, Metallic and silk thread	36 x 39	70.46	Woman's apron
	Sumbanese woman's ceremonial skirt		Indonesia	1900	Cotton, Nassa shells, Glass trade beads	29 x 46.5	33.682	Woman's ceremonial skirt
	Ksitigarbha bodhisattva		Japan	1175	Wood	49	59.29	Ksitigarbha bodhisattva
	Shigaraki ware storage jar		Japan	1450	Stoneware	17.75	81.378	Storage jar
	Moroccan wall hanging		Morocco	1800s	Silk velvet, Gold metallic thread	66 x 156	1983.66	Ceremonial hanging
	Helmet mask (Tatanua)		New Ireland	1880–1930	Wood, Cloth, Fiber, Pigment, Lime, Shells	19 x 8.25 x 11	1989.1421	Helmet mask (Tatanua)
