= Negress (disambiguation) =

Negress is the female form of the word Negro.

Negress may also refer to:

- A Negress, oil painting by Anna Bilińska-Bohdanowicz
- The Negress, bronze sculpture by Jean-Baptiste Carpeaux
- Blonde Negress I and White Negress II, sculptures by Constantin Brâncuși
