= Moroccan wall hanging =

19th-century Moroccan wall hanging

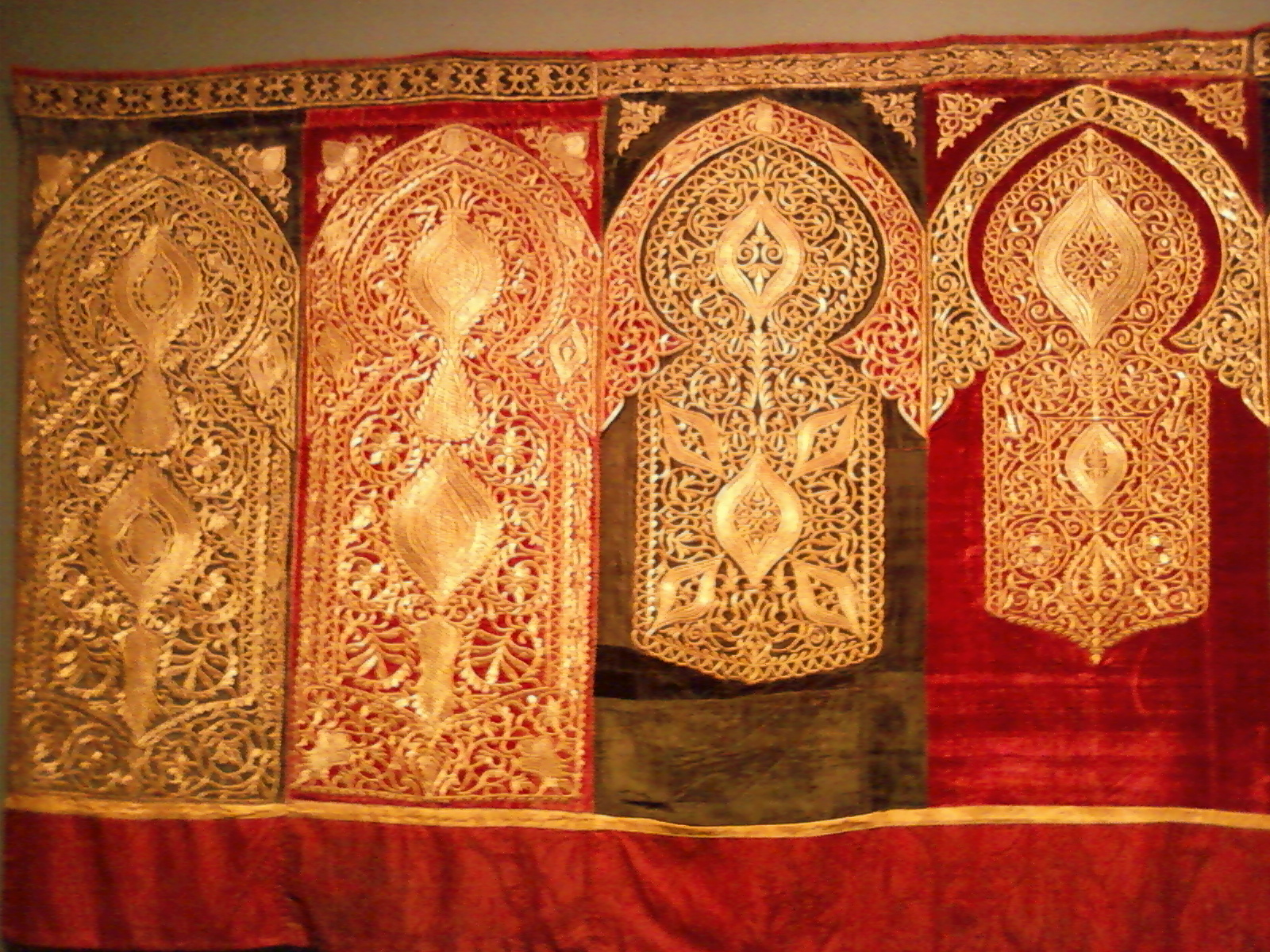
- Year: mid-1800s
- Type: textile
- Dimensions: 170 cm × 420 cm (66 in × 167 in)
- Location: Indianapolis Museum of Art, Indianapolis

This large, mid-19th century Moroccan wall hanging, or haiti, is a highlight of the textile collection of the Indianapolis Museum of Art, which is in Indianapolis, Indiana. Made in the cultural center of Fez, it is crafted of the finest materials: silk velvet embroidered with gold metallic thread.

== Description ==
The seven panels of this wall hanging, in alternating crimson and emerald velvet, were sewn not by women, as was typical of Moroccan embroidery, but by professional male needleworkers. That is because this haiti represents the most prestigious and complicated form of textile. The men were under close supervision by the leatherworkers' guild, since the work was so complex it required custom-made leather templates. They stitched around the templates with a special technique known as underside couching that kept the precious gold thread from being wasted on the unseen underside. The interlaced mihrab motif, echoes a mosque's arch-shaped niche.

== Historical information ==
Artisans in Fez had been creating sumptuous wall hangings like this since the 16th century. Magnificent embroideries of this particular type, with their large size and architectural elements, were reserved for grand occasions such as the week-long weddings of the wealthy. They provided a suitable backdrop for the bride in her finery.

== Location history ==
In 2003, the IMA loaned this artwork to the National Museum of African Art as part of an exhibit entitled "The Fabric of Moroccan Art," which was sponsored by Mohammed VI, king of Morocco. Of the dozens of textiles displayed, this one was lauded as "One of the most important pieces in the exhibition--and in the IMA's entire textile collection."

== Acquisition ==
This haiti was donated to the IMA by Eliza M. and Sarah L. Niblack in 1932. It became an official part of the museum's collection in 1983 per Sarah's bequest, and was given the accession number 1983.66. The Niblack family had acquired it when Admiral Albert Parker Niblack, Eliza's brother, was stationed in Gibraltar in 1917. His discerning eye led to a collection of 2,500 Moroccan, European, and Indonesian textiles, all of which found their way into the IMA's collection. The family's generosity means the museum holds one of the most important collections of Moroccan textiles in the United States, since most institutions focus on Turkish and Persian textiles.
