= Magbo helmet mask for Oro society =

African mask from Nigeria

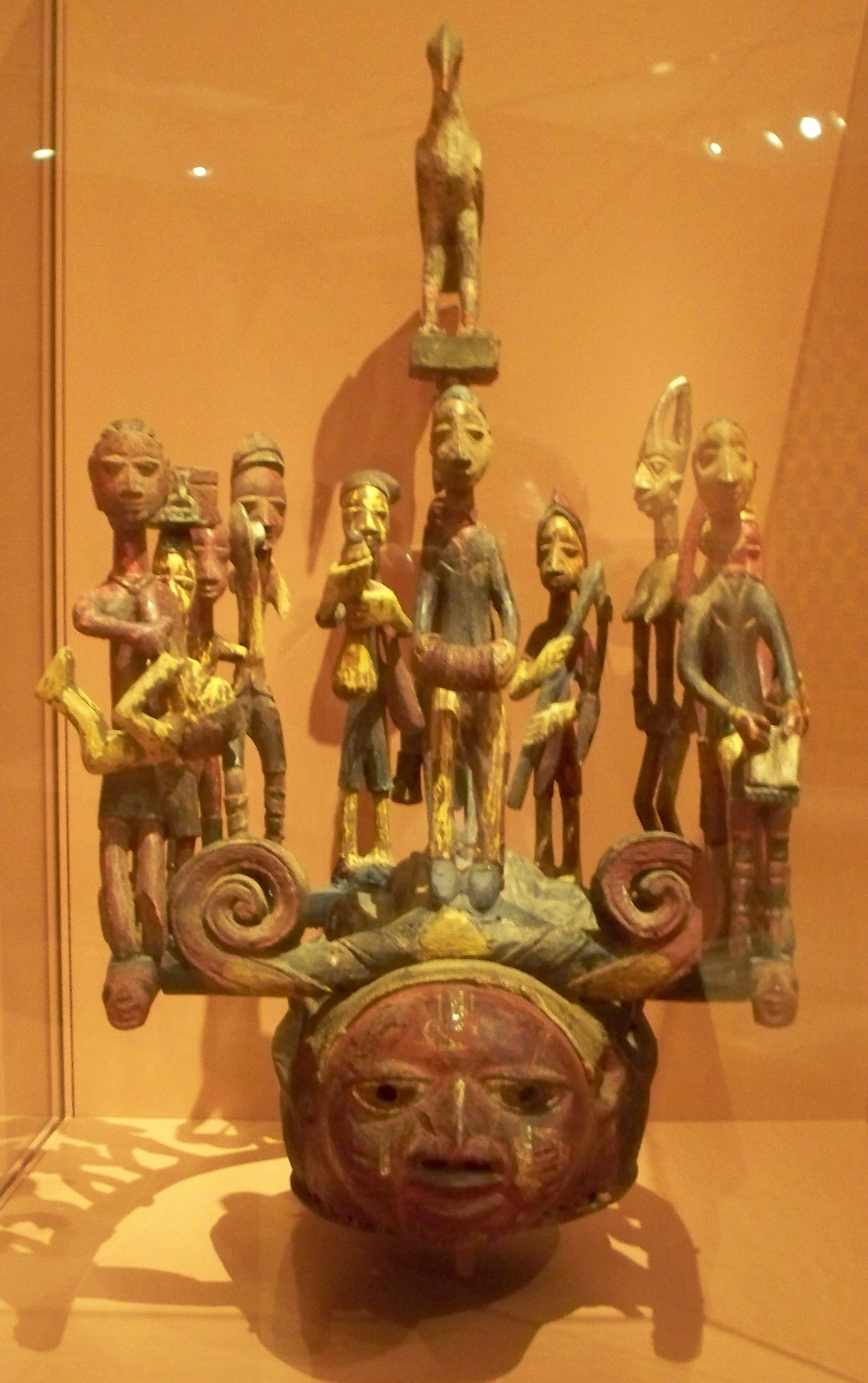
- Artist: Onabanjo of Itu Meko
- Year: 1880-1910
- Type: Wood carving
- Dimensions: 73.0 cm × 34.9 cm × 47 cm (28.75 in × 13.75 in × 18.5 in)
- Location: Indianapolis Museum of Art; Indianapolis

This Magbo helmet mask for an Oro society member was created by Yoruba artist Onabanjo of Itu Meko. It is now in the African collection of the Indianapolis Museum of Art, which is in Indianapolis, Indiana. Created between 1880 and 1910, it depicts a varied cast of community members carved of wood, colored with pigment, and mounted on a curved bar surmounting the helmet.

== Description ==
Thirteen distinct figures crown this helmet, including a prisoner, a nursing mother, a preacher, an accordion player, a soldier, an elder, a palmwine tapper, and a mounted warrior wearing a helmet of his own, this one topped by an enormous bird. This indicates the wide reach of the Oro society, encompassing the entire community. After 1850, Brazilian motifs (such as the double scrolls above the main face and floral clusters throughout) became a common part of the artistic vernacular among the Ijebu subgroup of the Yoruba people. This is because former slaves returned home, bringing new ideas to the already sophisticated culture.

== Historical information ==
In Yoruba communities, the secretive Oro society had immense power. It was composed of community leaders, who would meet to reward good deeds and punish bad ones with everything from chastisement to the death penalty. They also presided over burials.

=== Acquisition ===
This mask was purchased by Indianapolis philanthropist Harrison Eiteljorg in 1976. He gave it to the IMA in 1989, where it was given the accession number 1989.754. It is currently on view in the Eiteljorg Suite of African and Oceanic Art.

== Artist ==
Most African art is unattributed. The unusual practice of nailing the individual figures to the helmet, rather than carving the entire artwork from a single piece of wood, leads scholars to believe that this is the work of master carver Onabanjo, from the village of Itu Meko, Nigeria. The Brazilian motifs are also in keeping with his work.

== See also ==
- Yoruba art
