= Face mask (We people) =

African mask

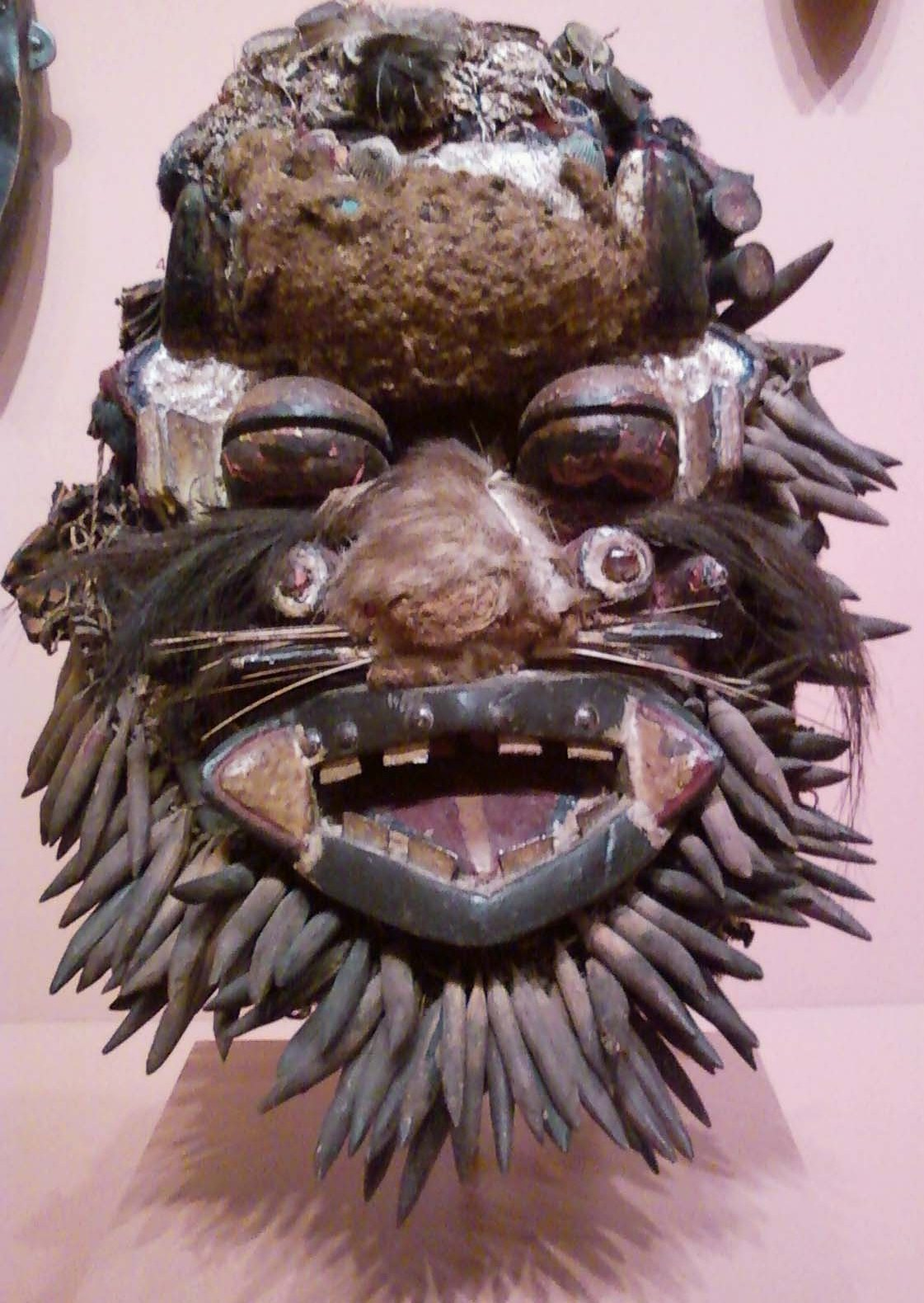
- Artist: Unknown We artist
- Year: 20th century
- Type: Wood, pigment, shells, cloth, fiber, fur, paper, metal, feathers, quills
- Dimensions: 19 × 13.5 × 11.5 in (48.3 × 34.3 × 29.2 cm)
- Location: Indianapolis Museum of Art; Indianapolis

An adorned wood face mask from the We (Wee) people of West Africa, dated to the 20th century is in the permanent African collection at the Indianapolis Museum of Art (as acquisition number 1989.373) and on display in the Eiteljorg Suite of African and Oceanic Art.

== Description ==
Designed to resemble a snarling leopard, this wooden mask is heavily adorned with a variety of materials to include pigment, shells, cloth, fiber, fur, paper, metal, feathers, and quills. This mask is denoted as male by the cartridge shells along the top and the wood carved leopard's teeth placed along the sides and bottom.

=== We people ===
The We, sometimes called the Krahn or Guere, are an indigenous African people that inhabit areas in eastern Liberia and western Côte d'Ivoire. In this region, masks such as this one typically start as simple, unadorned objects carved by a male artist. The mask is then handed down through generations with each new wearer adding adornments. According to the We, as each generation adds to the mask, it grows in ritual significance and power. The individual honored with wearing the mask traditionally wears an oversized skirt made of raffia fronds and may carry a ceremonial staff.

We masks similar to this one are often designed to appear ferocious and are intended for use in mediations between community members, as visual aids during moral lessons, and as forms of entertainment. By portraying the more frightening nature of the animal, the mask is viewed as powerful and may have been used as part of social control methods prior to the introduction of Western law systems during the colonial period.

== Acquisition ==
A detailed history of this mask is unknown. The work has however been dated to approximately 1900-50 and the acquisition credit line is attributed to a gift from Mr. and Mrs. Harrison Eiteljorg.
