= Breton Women at a Wall =

Painting by Émile Bernard

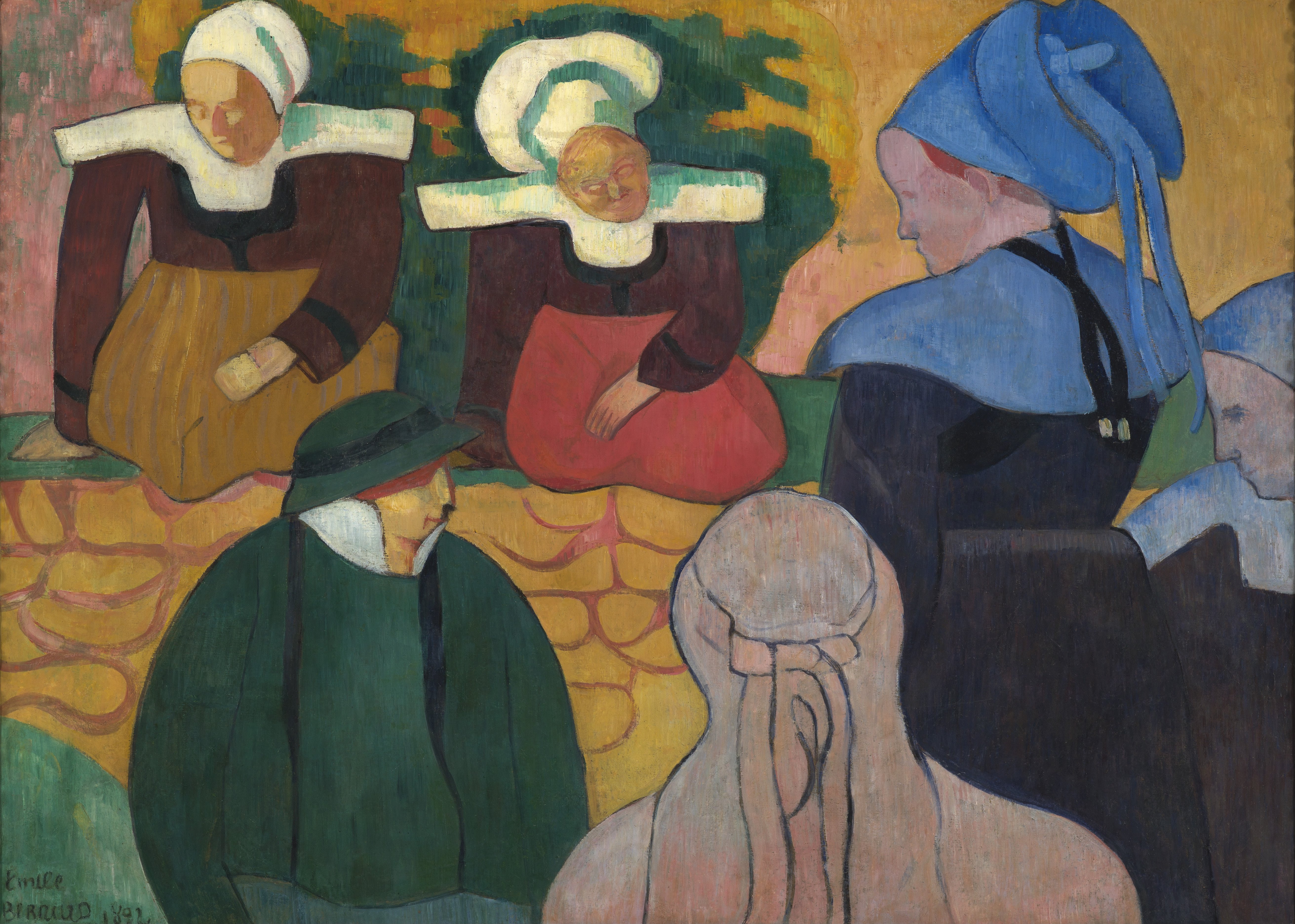
- Artist: Émile Bernard
- Year: 1892
- Type: Oil on cardboard
- Dimensions: 83.50 cm × 116 cm (32.875 in × 45.5 in)
- Location: Indianapolis Museum of Art; Indianapolis

Breton Women at a Wall is an oil painting by Émile Bernard. It is part of the permanent collection of the Indianapolis Museum of Art.

== Description ==
Bernard most likely painted this painting from memory, modeled after a trip he took with Paul Gauguin in 1888 to Brittany. The painting has five Breton women and one man gathering around a wall. Their faces are pointed down toward the cobblestone wall. Their heads are covered in traditional Pont-Aven coiffes and they are in traditional Brittany wear. The painting is proliferated with bright cobalts, yellows, greens, and reds, and is chosen for effect, rather than accuracy in representation. The women all have slight facial features, but they are indistinguishable. Bernard uses harsh, graphic outlines to help define the features of the women's outfits and faces. The man is dressed in all green, and facing the rest of the women. The characters are boldly flat, recalling Bernard's love of Japanese prints. The placement of the figures shows Bernard's disregard for traditional rules, including scale or perspective.

== Historical information ==
A young Bernard, together with Gauguin, took a trip to Pont-Aven, a remote location in France, and began creating a new, Post-Impressionist style of painting that defined the Pont-Aven School and Cloisonnism during the summer of 1888. Along with Gauguin, Bernard cherished Brittany and the Breton people, and Breton Women at a Wall reflects his fascination with their customs, which, in contemporary French society, was often seen as a way to get back to the past. Bernard would draw on his experiences in Brittany throughout his life.

=== Acquisition ===
The painting went through many private hands between 1893 and 1959, before landing in the hands of Swiss art collector Samuel Josefowitz. In 1998, the Indianapolis Museum of Art purchased the painting, along with 30 Gauguins, as a partial gift from Josefowitz.

== See also ==
- Post-Impressionism
- List of artworks at the Indianapolis Museum of Art
