= Haida ceremonial dance rattle (Indianapolis Museum of Art) =

Ritual dance rattle
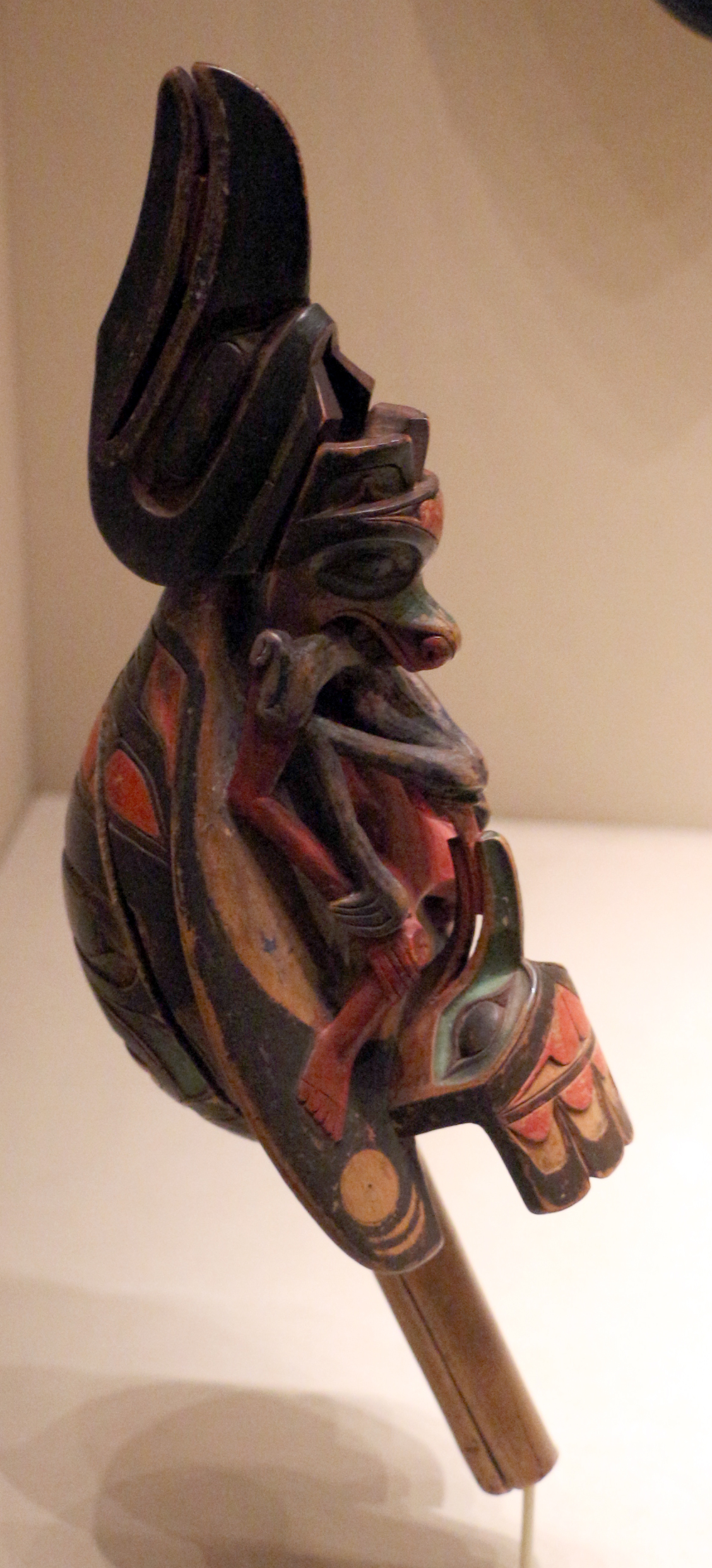
- Year: ca. 1850-1880
- Type: musical instrument
- Dimensions: 32.07 cm × 9.5 cm × 9.5 cm (12.625 in × 3.75 in × 3.75 in)
- Location: Indianapolis Museum of Art; Indianapolis

This ritual dance rattle in the form of a raven is part of the Native American collection of the Indianapolis Museum of Art in Indianapolis, Indiana. Made by the Haida people of British Columbia in the early- to mid-19th century, it contains a number of spiritually significant totems whose power would be harnessed by shamans to control spirits during rituals.

== Description ==
This wooden rattle is intricately carved from a single piece of wood and richly pigmented in green, red, and black. It depicts a raven clenching the tongue of a frog in its beak. The figure at the bottom, which bites the frog's body, is unidentified. The precise significance of the configuration is unknown; it might imbue the shaman with the bird's vision, or the power of the frog's poison. Extended tongues are a common artistic motif in the region, often sexual in nature but in this case most likely referring to the tongue as the seat of life force. While there is some contention that raven rattles were reserved for chiefs, they have been found in the graves of shamans, making that distinction as difficult to confirm as the meaning of the rattle's iconography.

== Historical information ==
Albert P. Niblack, an Indianapolis native, collected this rattle in the field during his stint as an ethnographer. He traveled widely through the region, publishing his findings in 1888 in The Coast Indians of Southern Alaska and Northern British Columbia. While recognizing the excellence of their woodcarving, Lt. Niblack was somewhat disparaging of the musicality of the instruments he collected, declaring that "some of their devices . . . are essentially for the creation of a hideous noise."

=== Acquisition ===
This artifact was a gift to the IMA from (by then) Vice Admiral Niblack in 1930. It has the accession number 30.550 and is currently on view in the Michael and Patricia McCrory & Richard and Rebecca Feldman Gallery.

== See also ==
- Shamanic music
- Cultural depictions of ravens
