= Tidying Up =

1941 painting by Isabel Bishop

- Artist: Isabel Bishop
- Year: 1941
- Medium: oil on masonite
- Dimensions: 38 cm × 29 cm (15 in × 11.5 in)
- Location: Indianapolis Museum of Art; Indianapolis, Indiana

Tidying Up is an oil painting by American artist Isabel Bishop. It is currently in the permanent collection at the Indianapolis Museum of Art.

== Description ==
Tidying Up depicts a young contemporary (1930s or 1940s) working woman in an unguarded moment of checking herself in her hand mirror.

Bishop's work generally focuses on young women caught during the idle moments away from their jobs. Her active brushwork served to reflect the upward social mobility experienced by working women of this period, while her color palette recalls works of the Italian Renaissance. Bishop's subject matter is quickly rendered, and lines are expressive and dynamic. Her quick brushstroke evokes the everyday activity and animation of the modern city.

== Historical information ==
Educated at the New York School of Applied Design for Women, Bishop was part of the loosely organized Fourteenth Street School, who were influenced by the realism of the Ashcan School. They painted scenes of daily life that concentrated on middle-class and lower-class peoples. Bishop focused on female subjects, usually in work settings. She spent more than ten years painting the secretaries, sales clerks, and blue-collar workers who lived or worked in and around Union Square. Her favorite subject was women going about their everyday lives, eating, talking, putting on makeup, taking off their coats. These ordinary motions produced facial expressions that Bishop felt revealed the personality of the people she portrayed.

=== Acquisition ===
The Indianapolis Museum of Art purchased Tidying Up from Midtown Galleries in New York City in 1943.

== See also ==
- List of artworks at the Indianapolis Museum of Art
