= Healing of Abiku Children =

1973 artwork by Twins Seven-Seven

- Artist: Twins Seven-Seven
- Year: 1973
- Dimensions: 130.5 cm × 131 cm (51.4 in × 52 in)
- Location: Indianapolis Museum of Art; Indianapolis

Healing of Abiku Children is a piece created by the Nigerian artist Twins Seven Seven in 1973, located in the Indianapolis Museum of Art, which is in Indianapolis, Indiana, United States. It consists of a large wooden plaque intricately carved and dyed with pigment to depict an important Yoruba ceremony. In it, a mother consults with a priest to keep her abiku twins in this world, rather than dying and being reborn to her over and over.

== Description ==
Twins Seven Seven was intimately familiar with the ritual he depicted, being the sole surviving child of seven sets of twins. The Yoruba are both blessed with an unusually high incidence of twins and cursed with high infant mortality, a fact which they explain with the concept of abiku, or children born to die shortly thereafter. To end the cycle, mothers consult special divination priests, who use ceremonies and medicines to convince the children to remain in the community. The predominant figure in this work is such a mother, who holds one of her abiku twins while the other sleeps on her back. To the left, the priest framed by the door mixes the potions he will use on the children. Every inch of space is filled by people busily performing various tasks, their large eyes and facial scarification matching traditional Yoruba ideals of beauty. Twins Seven Seven's unique combination of modern and traditional styles (he was trained by German artists in Nigeria) is on display in this work, with its intricate, rhythmic designs from edge to edge and an almost sculptural quality due to the combination of carving and coloring the wood.

=== Acquisition ===
Healing of Abiku Children was commissioned in 1972 by Dr. Hanus Grosz of Indianapolis, who requested a work on "healing".

In 1993, Healing of Abiku Children was given to the IMA by Mr. and Mrs. Harrison Eiteljorg. It is currently displayed in the Eiteljorg Suite of African and Oceanic Art and has the acquisition number 1993.82.

== See also ==
- Yoruba religion
- Ibeji
- 1973 in art
