= The Negress =

Bronze sculpture by Jean-Baptiste Carpeaux

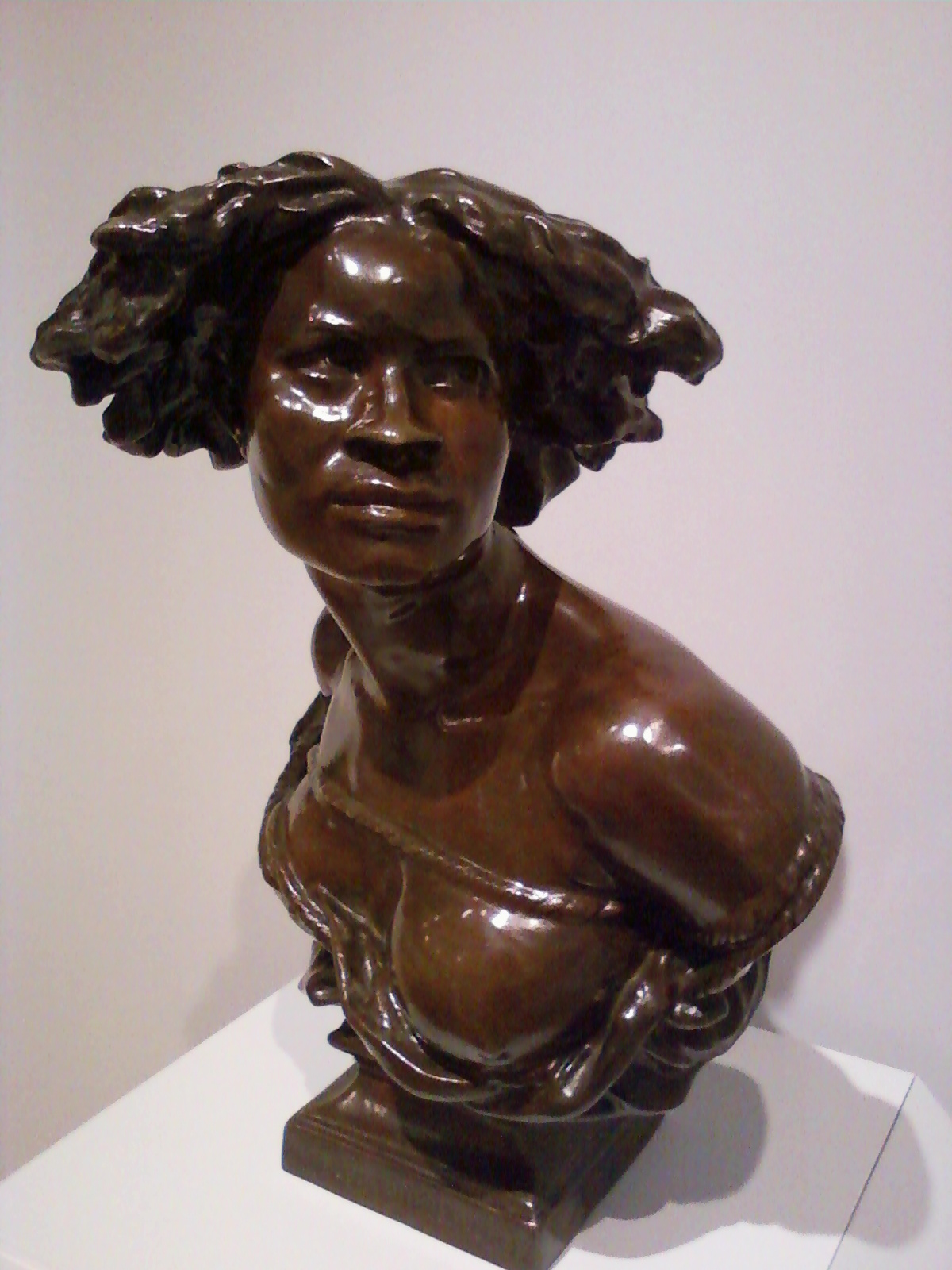
- Artist: Jean-Baptiste Carpeaux
- Year: 1868
- Type: Bronze sculpture
- Dimensions: 56.83 cm (22.375 in)
- Location: Indianapolis Museum of Art; Indianapolis, Indiana

The Negress is a bronze sculpture by French artist Jean-Baptiste Carpeaux. It is now in the permanent collection at the Indianapolis Museum of Art.The Negress was purchased by the Indianapolis Museum of Art in 1980.

The Negress relates to Carpeaux's last monumental sculpture project, Fontaine de l'Observatoire, in Paris's Luxembourg Garden. To interpret this theme, Carpeaux elected to use four life-size female figures supporting a globe and representing different races as continents. The Indianapolis bronze is a preparatory work for Africa, presented as a bust rather than a full-length figure.

A terracotta copy of The Negress is located in the Metropolitan Museum of Art.

== Description ==
The Negress portrays a woman who is the personification of the continent of Africa. Carpeaux wanted to use her to emphasize the horrors of slavery, creating the piece three years after the Civil War of the United States had ended and twenty years after slavery was banned in all French and Danish colonies. The woman is looking to the side, her figure twisting to the left. Her twisting body contributed to the fountain's composition. Her features express her strength and her human vulnerability, as she is also tied in bondage. Her skin is covered in a patina, enhancing the sculpture's use of light and shadow. The words, "Why be born a slave?" (in French, "Pourquoi! Naître esclave ?") are inscribed in the base, emphasizing her attachment to her depiction as an enslaved African.

== See also ==
- Fontaine de l'Observatoire
- Why Born Enslaved!
- List of artworks at the Indianapolis Museum of Art
