= Peasant with a Wheelbarrow =

19th-century painting by Jean-François Millet

- L'homme a la brouette (French)
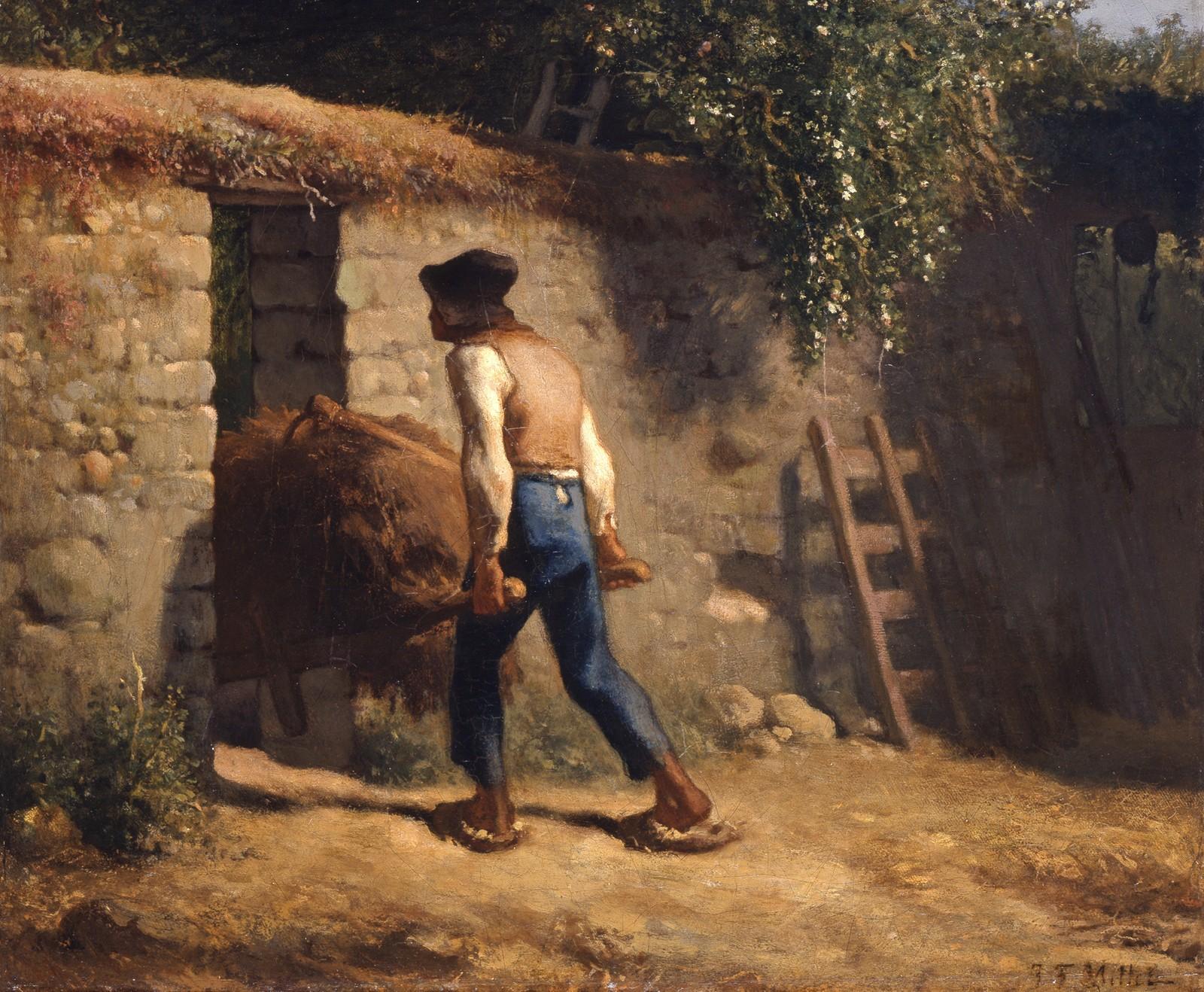
- Artist: Jean-François Millet
- Year: c. 1848–1852
- Type: Oil painting on canvas
- Dimensions: 37.78 cm × 45.40 cm (14.87 in × 17.87 in)
- Location: Indianapolis Museum of Art, Indianapolis

Peasant with a Wheelbarrow is an oil-on-canvas painting by French artist Jean-François Millet, begun in 1848 but not finished until Millet found a buyer in 1852. It depicts a peasant man pushing a wheelbarrow. It was acquired in 1949 by the Indianapolis Museum of Art in Indianapolis, Indiana.

== Description ==
In Peasant with a Wheelbarrow, Millet took a peasant farmer with simple clothes and tools, and transformed him into a symbol of the dignity of manual labor. The peasant is utterly idealized, bathed in a golden light and transmuted into an emblem of a vanishing way of life.

== Historical information ==
Moving to Barbizon in 1849, Millet quickly became associated with the Barbizon School. Although he shared their enthusiasm for painting fresh, outdoors scenes, Millet also liked to depict the local farmers. He found the nobility of the peasants, with their lives grounded in the soil, a welcome change from the instability of modern life. The school was brought to its highest prominence by the Revolution of 1848. The classically trained Millet was making a powerful political statement with this image, which raised a humble rural scene to the same level as a history painting. This intimate portrait reveals Millet's poetic side. Soon, he would transition to epic canvases for the Salon.

=== Acquisition ===
Peasant with a Wheelbarrow was acquired by the IMA in 1949, a gift of the James E. Roberts Fund and the Alumni Association of the John Herron Art School. It has the accession number 49.48.

== See also ==
- The Angelus
- The Gleaners
