= They Waz Nice White Folks While They Lasted (Sez One Gal to Another) =

Installation by Kara Walker

- Artist: Kara Walker
- Year: 2001
- Type: installation art
- Dimensions: 430 cm × 430 cm × 610 cm (168 in × 168 in × 240 in)
- Location: Indianapolis Museum of Art; Indianapolis

They Waz Nice White Folks While They Lasted (Sez One Gal to Another) is a 2001 installation artwork by American artist Kara Walker, located at the Indianapolis Museum of Art, which is in Indianapolis, Indiana, United States. It consists of paper cutouts forming a strange tableau with the projected image of a steamboat.

== Description ==
The installation consists of an overhead projector casting the image of a steamboat on the gallery wall, with a variety of bizarre silhouettes performing strange actions in front of it. A woman with hoof-like feet stands next to a woman holding a bust over her head, and a boy with a battleship on his head is beside a woman whose grotesquely malformed baby is tumbling off her back. She waves her handkerchief to a couple on the steamboat itself, a woman holding a uniformed man at gunpoint. The light of the projector causes the shadows of viewers to be cast upon the wall as well, entangling them in the artwork.

== Background information ==
Walker reappropriates the cut-paper silhouettes crafted by proper ladies in the nineteenth century to create strange tableaux from antebellum romance novels and slave narratives. They Waz Nice White Folks While They Lasted is actually one of her less disturbing works, which can feature images of rape, murder, and torture. Although she has received many letters protesting her use of images conveying negative African American stereotypes, Walker responds that their controversial nature is the very thing that makes them worthy of discussion.

=== Location history ===
They Waz Nice White Folks While They Lasted first appeared in Walker's third solo show in New York, a 2001 exhibit in the Brent Sikkema gallery in Chelsea called "American Primitive." That show marked the first time her signature silhouettes appeared with projected backgrounds. In 2002, it was acquired by the IMA, a gift of the Contemporary Art Society, and given the acquisition number 2002.1. It is not currently on view in the Carolyn M. Schaefer & John B. Gray Jr. Gallery.
