= U.S.A. (painting) =

1889 painting by John Haberle

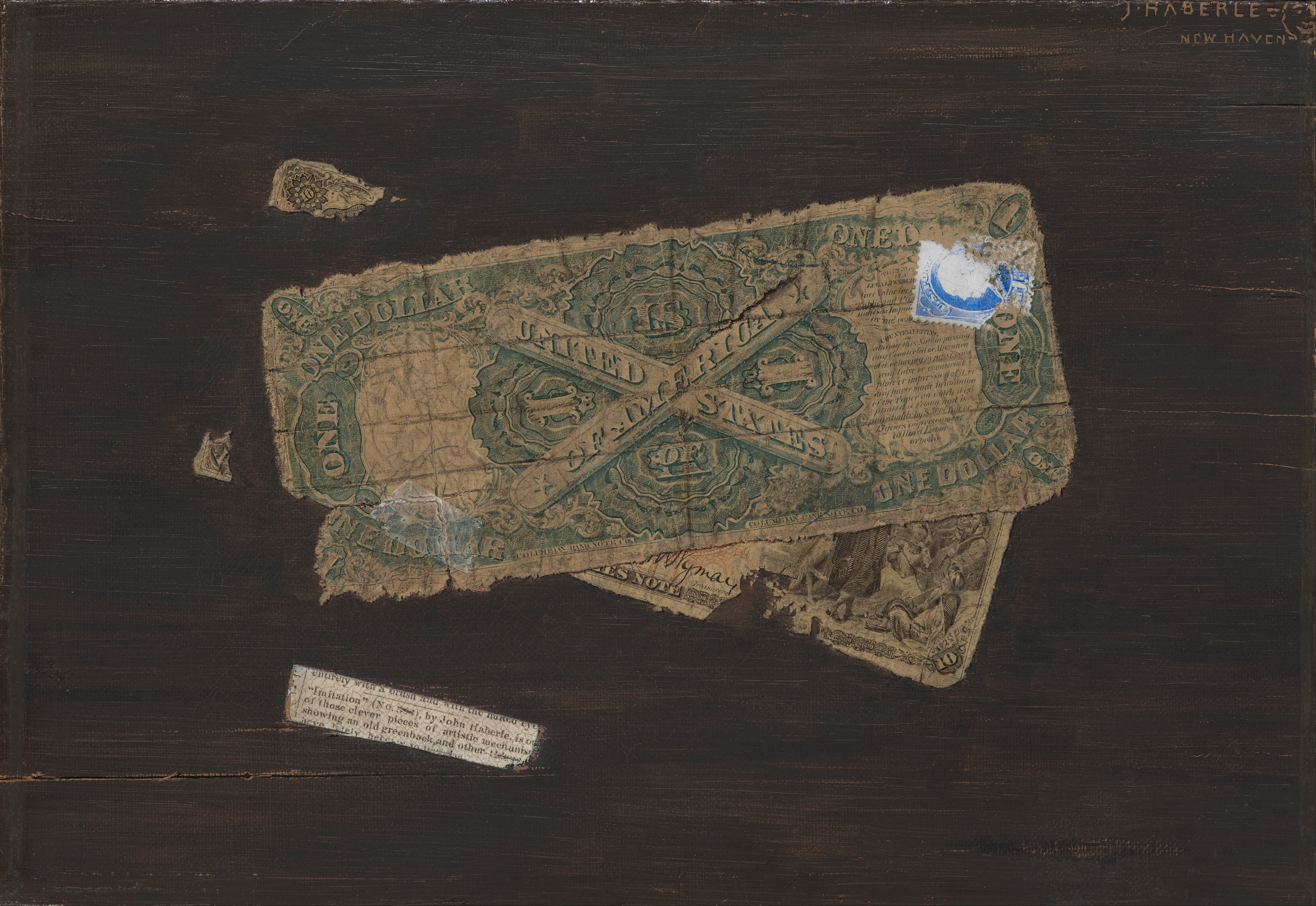
- Artist: John Haberle
- Year: 1889
- Type: Oil painting on canvas
- Dimensions: 22 cm × 30 cm (8.5 in × 12 in)
- Location: Indianapolis Museum of Art, Indianapolis

U.S.A. is a trompe-l'œil oil painting by American artist John Haberle from 1889, located in the Indianapolis Museum of Art, which is in Indianapolis, Indiana. It depicts currency and stamps so realistically that Haberle was accused of pasting real money to the canvas.

== Description ==
U.S.A. depicts a scattering of worn American stamps and bills, particularly the back of a dollar bill emblazoned with a warning against reproducing it. In a wry touch, Haberle also painted on a newspaper clipping praising one of his earlier works. U.S.A. is signed in the upper right corner with "J. Haberle" and a smiley face, and again on the metal plate on front of the shadow box frame, which Haberle painted to look engraved.

== Historical information ==
In 1886, William Harnett, another noted photorealistic painter, was arrested for counterfeiting. This apparently inspired Haberle to produce an abundance of exact facsimiles of American currency, particularly in his first four years as a painter, from 1887 to 1891. Haberle originally trained as an engraver, which helped prepare him for his particular artistic calling. Despite warnings from the Secret Service, Haberle persisted in producing such images in his particularly wry manner.

While governmental rebukes only encouraged Haberle to greater productivity, the accusation of trickery enraged him. When U.S.A. was first exhibited at the Art Institute of Chicago, a newspaper critic declared that the artist must have used actual money and stamps. Haberle immediately traveled to Chicago and, armed with magnifying glass, paint remover, and art experts, categorically proved that the canvas was covered only in oil paint.

=== Location history ===
It was a display of Harnett's work in a New York saloon that led to his brush with the Secret Service and rapid retreat from currency-themed art. Haberle, however, sold U.S.A. to Marvin Preston, manager of Churchill's Saloon in Detroit, where it hung unmolested. That setting was typical for trompe-l'œil paintings, which tended to have masculine themes like money and hunting trophies and reside in manly places like bars. His grandson, also Marvin Preston, donated it to the Sally Turner Gallery in Plainfield, New Jersey.

=== Acquisition ===
U.S.A. was a gift from Paul and Ruth Buchanan of Indianapolis in 2002. It is currently on view in the Paine Turn of the Century American Art Gallery and has the acquisition number 2002.225.
