= The Love Song (Rockwell) =

1926 painting by Norman Rockwell

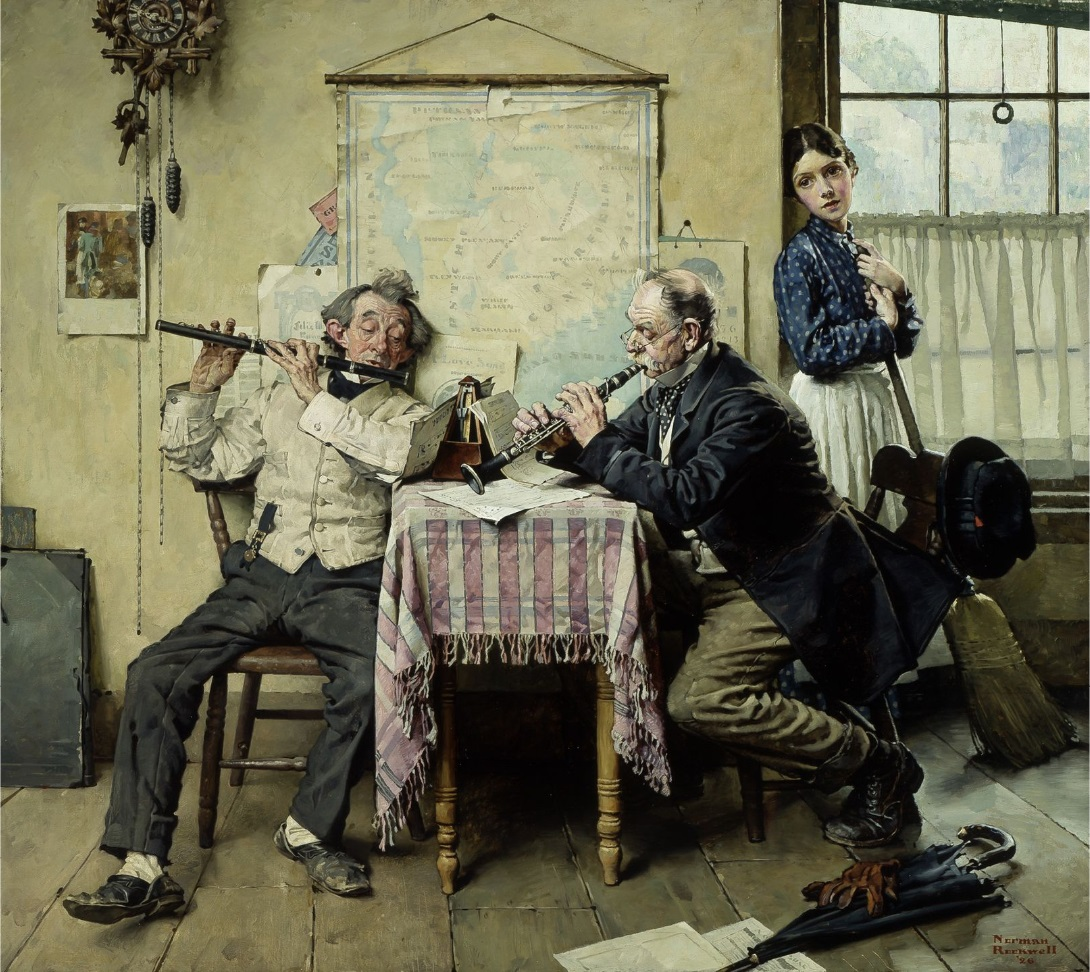
- Artist: Norman Rockwell
- Year: 1926
- Type: oil painting
- Dimensions: 97.47 cm × 108.90 cm (38.375 in × 42.875 in)
- Location: Indianapolis Museum of Art; Indianapolis

The Love Song is an oil painting by American artist Norman Rockwell, located in the Indianapolis Museum of Art, which is in Indianapolis, Indiana, United States. It originally appeared in the Ladies Home Journal in December 1926. It depicts two elderly musicians, on flute and clarinet, playing a duet while a young girl takes a break from sweeping to listen. The painting's title appears on the sheet music from which the musicians play.

== Description ==
The Love Song depicts one of Rockwell's common themes, the contrast of youth and age, through the wistful young girl and the elderly musicians. Although the main scene is linear and realistic like most of his work, Rockwell adds an impressionist landscape outside the window to demonstrate his range of talents. Rockwell's fascination with antique maps, of which he had a sizable collection, can be seen in the old map he uses to anchor the scene in rural America. It is signed and dated in red in the lower right corner "Norman Rockwell '26".

== Historical information ==
Rockwell was only thirty-two when he was commissioned to paint The Love Song, but he had already had a flourishing artistic career illustrating The Saturday Evening Post for ten years by that point. His fame grew rapidly in the years to come, but he maintained a relationship with Ladies' Home Journal that lasted until near the end of his life, as a 1971 article called "Thanksgiving with Norman Rockwell" included seven pages of his art.

=== Acquisition ===
The Love Song was purchased from Rockwell by Freeman E. Hertzel. His niece, Anne Blackman, and her husband Sidney Blackman gave it to the IMA through Carol Smithwick in 1997. It is on display in the American Scene Gallery and its acquisition number is 1997.151.
