= Madonna and Child with Saints John the Baptist and Mary Magdalene =

Painting by Neroccio di Bartolomeo de' Landi

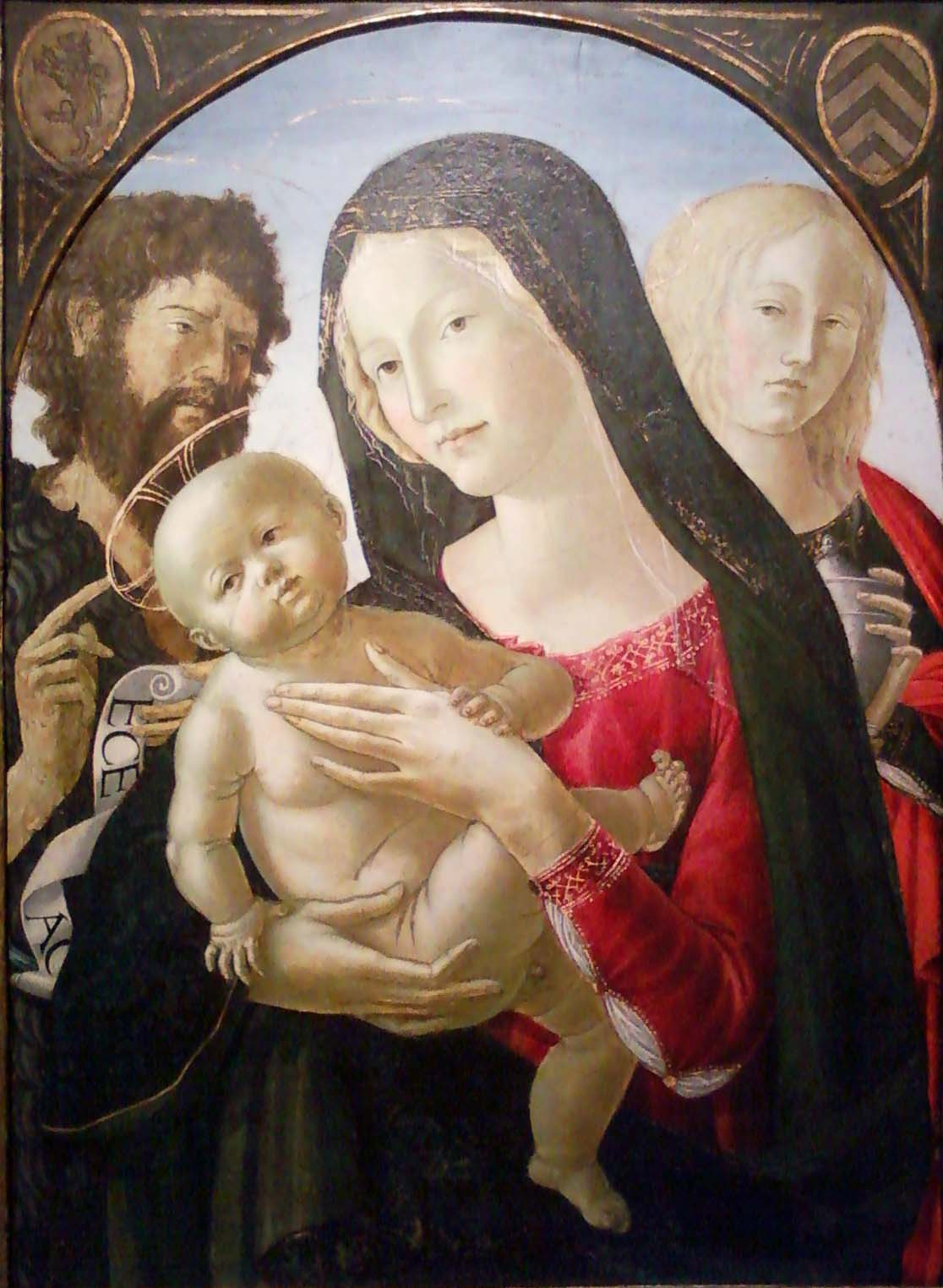
- Artist: Neroccio di Bartolomeo de' Landi
- Year: 1495
- Medium: Tempera on wood
- Dimensions: 71 cm × 51.12 cm (28 in × 20.125 in)
- Location: Indianapolis Museum of Art, Indianapolis

The Madonna and Child with Saints John the Baptist and Mary Magdalene is a 1495 painting in tempera on wood by Neroccio di Bartolomeo de' Landi. It is currently held by the Indianapolis Museum of Art.

== Background ==
Neroccio was an Italian painter and sculptor born in Siena in 1447. He was from a wealthy noble family of Siena (the Landi family). He learned his artistic skills under the tutelage of Lorenzo di Pietro, also known as Vecchietta, a famous Sienese artist (also responsible for teaching various Sienese painters).

In 1468 he worked as a shop boy during the cathedral works of Siena and in 1468 he already worked independently, being commissioned by Fra Giovanni. For some time he worked with Francesco di Giorgio (painter, engineer, architect), sharing the same workshop, but this partnership was dissolved in 1474. Still, while they worked together, Neroccio was heavily influenced by di Giorgio's work. Neroccio and di Giorgio are also known to have started "a new blonde and ethereal female ideal in Sienese painting". Most of his paintings feature blond females and Madonna and Child with St. John the Baptist and St. Mary Magdalene is a good example of this.

Some of Neroccio's paintings were probably made by his collaborators in his workshop. However, it is known that the Madonna and Child with St. John the Baptist and St. Mary Magdalene is a work of art done exclusively by him. Most of his artworks were intended for small and private devotion and for that reason he was very coveted in Siena during the time.

== Analysis ==
According to the gallery label provided by the Indianapolis Museum of Art:

Devotional images of the Madonna and Child were a mainstay of Neroccio's workshop. Working from a standard half-length format, the artist altered the composition by adding different saints according to the wishes of his clients. Here, he has inserted John the Baptist, who carries a scroll that proclaims the coming of Christ, and Mary Magdalene, who holds the jar of oil with which she anointed the feet of Jesus.
The infant Christ's nudity expresses his humanity, and therefore, the possibility of his suffering and death.
