= Ksitigarbha bodhisattva =

Ksitigarbha Bodhisattva
- Jizō Bosatsu, 地蔵菩薩 (Japanese)
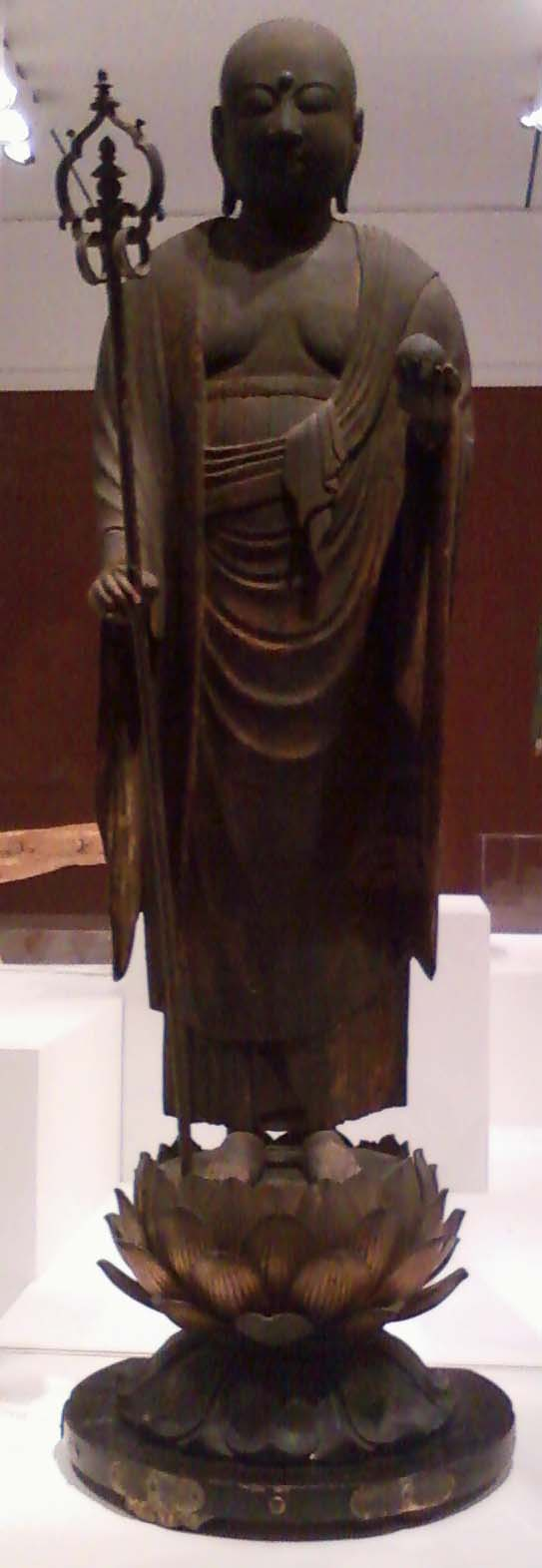
- Artist: Unknown Japanese artist
- Year: c. 1175
- Type: Wood and bronze
- Dimensions: 49 in (124.5 cm)
- Location: Indianapolis Museum of Art; Indianapolis, IN

Ksitigarbha Bodhisattva (Jizō Bosatsu, 地蔵菩薩), is a Japanese wood and bronze statue of about 1175 in the late Heian period, which is now in the permanent Asian collection at the Indianapolis Museum of Art. The statue depicts Jizō (Ksitigarbha in Sanskrit), who in Japanese Buddhism is the bodhisattva of the earth, and is considered a protector of children and travelers. He is also a rescuer of beings in hell and is considered a guardian of souls for children who have died before their parents.

== Description ==
Jizō is garbed in traditional monk's attire, lacking ornate jewelry and adornments typically seen on images of Bodhisattvas. He is shown in a standing position, with his right foot slightly forward, a common pose for this bodhisattva used to indicate his physical presence walking through the present world. In his right hand Jizō carries a six ringed alarum staff, or khakkhara, used to warn insects of his presence, and in his left hand he carries a cintamani jewel, believed to light up the dark as well as grant wishes. Below Jizō is situated an open lotus flower, a traditional Buddhist symbol of purity amidst the imperfections of the physical world.

== Style ==
The style of this statue is reflective of the transitioning attitudes and ideals observed in the early Kamakura period. During this time Japan faced a shift from the nobility that governed the late Fujiwara period to the "landowning military men" that seized power at the start of the Kamakura period. Dramatic shifts in politics, society, and culture resulted in a transformation of artistic design, with focus placed heavily on realism and honesty. Additionally, the Kamakura era marked a turning point in religious activity, with Buddhism becoming more heavily practiced among the masses Stylistically, Ksitigarbha Bodhisattva (Jizō Bosatsu) reflects this shift towards Buddhism in its depiction of the Bodhisattva, as well as the realism of early Kamakura art in the "highly stylized geometric" shaping of the statue's head and torso.

== Acquisition ==
A detailed history of this statue is unknown. The work has however been dated to approximately 1175; it was acquired through the Evans Woollen Jr. Memorial Fund in 1959.
