= Covered jar with carp design =

16th-century Chinese ceramic work

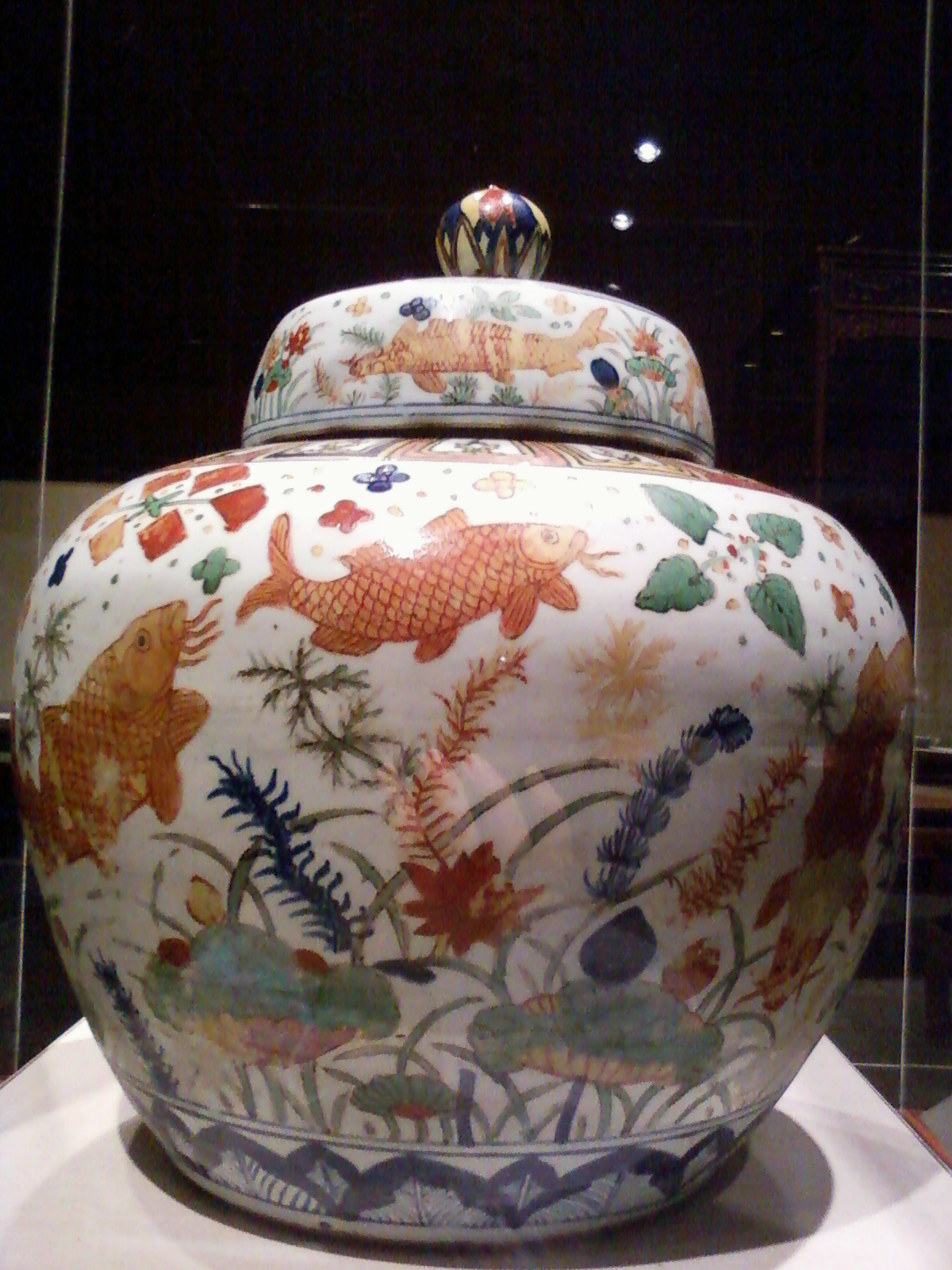
- Year: 1522-1566
- Type: porcelain
- Dimensions: 46 cm (18 in); 39 cm diameter (15.5 in)
- Location: Indianapolis Museum of Art; Indianapolis

This covered jar with a carp design is a piece of porcelain from the Jiajing period of the Ming Dynasty in China, now in the Indianapolis Museum of Art, which is in Indianapolis, Indiana. Created between 1522 and 1566, it is exceptionally large and elaborate and would have been a source of great prestige for its owner.

== Description ==
The base of the jar is emblazoned with the reign mark Da Ming Jiajing nianzhi, or "Made during the Jiajing reign of the great Ming dynasty," in two columns, but the distinctive style would have made the time period clear enough without that label. While underglaze blue designs and overglaze enamel paintings began to appear on Chinese porcelain in the fifteenth century, during the sixteenth they became markedly bolder and more exuberant in design and color. This was a complex process, requiring multiple firings. For the first firing, a clear glaze over a cobalt-based paint resulted in vivid blue designs on the white porcelain. Before the second firing, translucent enamels applied over the glaze resulted in a range of brilliant colors. The end result is this vivid design, the swimming carp depicted from an angle that makes it appear the jar is transparent.

== Historical information ==
Since Jiajing was a devout Taoist, motifs popular in that tradition became widespread during his reign. While fish came with many associations, including pleasure, abundance, success, and royalty, one of the best-known associations comes from the fourth-century BC Taoist philosophers Zhuangzi and Huizi. Zhuangzi said, “See how the fish swim as they please. That’s what fish really enjoy.” When Huizi asked, “How do you know what fish enjoy?” Zhuangzi replied, “You’re not I, so how do you know I don’t know what fish enjoy?”

== Acquisition ==
The jar was given to the IMA in by Mr. and Mrs. Eli Lilly in 1960. It has the accession numbers 60.88A-B, and is currently on view in the Valeria J. Medveckis Gallery.

== See also ==
- Chinese ceramics
