= Cliff Rock - Appledore =

Painting by Childe Hassam

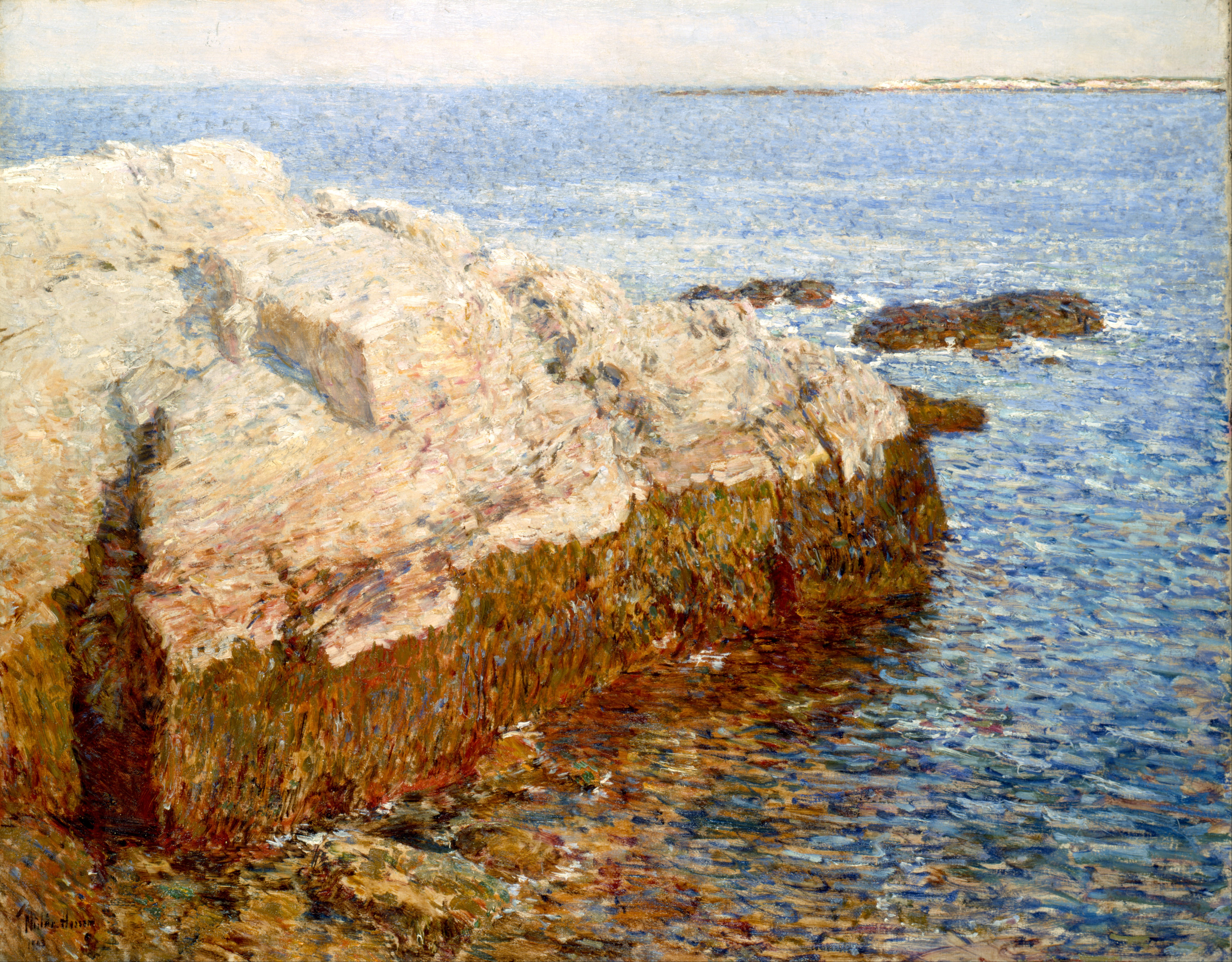
- Artist: Childe Hassam
- Year: 1903
- Medium: oil on canvas
- Dimensions: 74 cm × 91 cm (29 in × 36 in)
- Location: Indianapolis Museum of Art; Indianapolis, Indiana
- Owner: Indianapolis Museum of Art

Cliff Rock - Appledore is an oil painting by American artist Childe Hassam, painted in 1903. It is part of the permanent collection at the Indianapolis Museum of Art.

== Description ==
Inspired by the French impressionists, Hassam used varying brushstrokes, bold color, and confident free handling of the medium. Blue ocean reflects onto the large, sun-bleached rock, while distant shores beyond are barely hinted at with lines of cream and green. Broken brushstrokes suggest shadows and reflections of the water.

== Historical information ==
Hassam, like many American painters at the turn of the century, studied in Paris for three years. He adopted the impressionist style as his own, and worked closely with other American Impressionists such as Mary Cassatt. He is often hailed as a pure example of the American Impressionist movement.

A native New Endlander, Hassam heavily favored the New England area for his work, and spent his time painting much of the Atlantic Coast. This shore is the shore of Appledore, one of the nine islands that make up the Isles of Shoals, located off the coasts of New Hampshire and Maine. Appledore was the location of a small artist colony.

=== Acquisition ===
Cliff Rock - Appledore was purchased at its inaugural exhibition in 1906 by the John Herron Art Fund.
