= Shigaraki ware storage jar (Indianapolis Museum of Art) =

Japanese storage jar

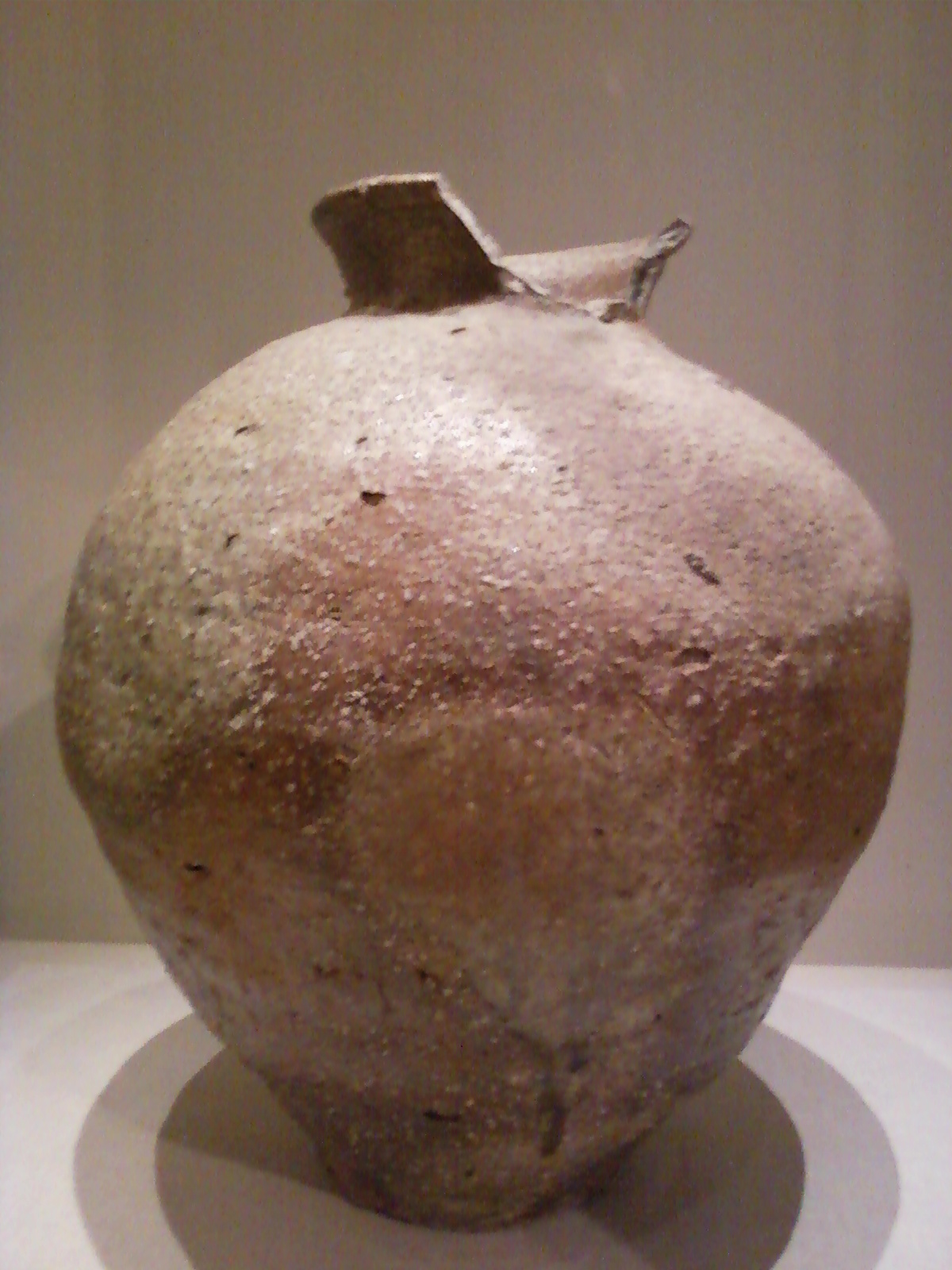
- Year: ca. 1550
- Type: stoneware
- Dimensions: 45.1 cm (17.75 in); 39.69 cm diameter (15.625 in)
- Location: Indianapolis Museum of Art, Indianapolis

The shigaraki ware storage jar is part of the Japanese collection of the Indianapolis Museum of Art, which is in Indianapolis, Indiana. Created in about 1550, during the Muromachi period, it was at some point broken, which would severely limit its utility. However, it was carefully preserved through the centuries as an art object.

== History ==
Such jars from Shigaraki were originally created for grain storage. However, their rough simplicity captured the attention of Zen practitioners, and they began to use them as water jars during the Japanese tea ceremony beginning in the sixteenth century. Their very imperfections, such as asymmetry and uneven coloration, made them all the more suitable as representations of the artless perfection sought for the meditative ritual.

The jar was purchased in 1981 with the help of the Martha Delzell Memorial Fund. It currently is on display in the Valeria J. Medveckis Gallery and has the accession number 81.378. Shigaraki ware jars of similar size and age have recently sold for between $10,000 and $50,000.

== Description ==
The clay used to create this jar was mixed with stone fragments and pebbles, resulting in an uneven surface that resembles the natural variations of granite. It was formed by quickly patting down clay coils, for a rough, asymmetrical profile. The glaze was made when ashes from the wood burning in the kiln landed on the vessel and liquified, their varying amounts of iron resulting in the different colors.

== See also ==
- Japanese craft
- Japanese pottery and porcelain
- List of Traditional Crafts of Japan
