= Vase with nine peach design =

Qing dynasty porcelain piece

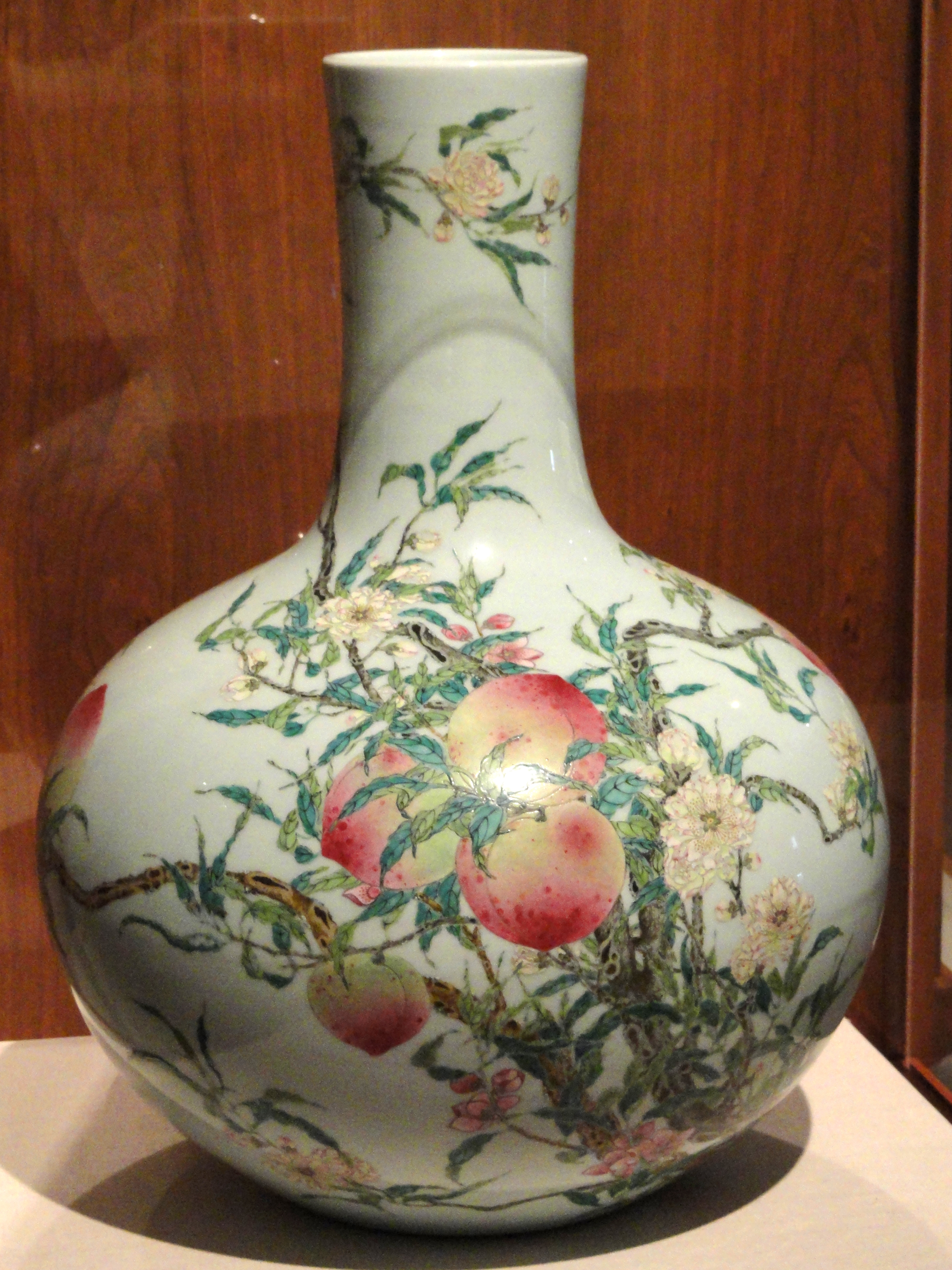
- Year: 1736-1795
- Type: Porcelain
- Dimensions: 50 cm (19.5 in); 37 cm diameter (14.5 in)
- Location: Indianapolis Museum of Art; Indianapolis

This vase with a nine peach design is part of the Chinese collection of the Indianapolis Museum of Art, which is in Indianapolis, Indiana, United States. It is a fine piece of Jingdezhen porcelain with overglaze (or "enamel") decoration dating from the Qianlong period of the Qing dynasty, made between 1736 and 1795.

== Description ==
The six-character reign mark on the bottom of this vase ("Da Qing Qianlong nian zhi") indicates that it was made under imperial patronage. The excellent quality and large size would have made it very suitable for display in the imperial palace. The design of peach buds, blossoms, leaves and fruits appears naturalistic, but that configuration would never appear in nature. Rather, it is a sort of rebus, as is common in Chinese decorations. Peaches symbolize immortality (thanks to the goddess Xiwangmu and her peach tree that only bore fruit every three millennia) and "nine" and "a long time" are homophones, so this design represents longevity and timelessness. The artist handled the theme very skillfully, using the complex shape of the vase to make the peaches most prominent by placing them on the vase's shoulder.

=== Historical information ===
In the early eighteenth century, Chinese artists realized that they could create opaque colors by adding white pigment to translucent enamels. This enabled them to use the same color palette they had recently encountered in oil paintings brought to China by European traders. This discovery led to unprecedented artistic freedom and creativity.

=== Location history ===
This vase was loaned to the Smithsonian Institution to be part of the exhibit "Asia in America: Chinese Art from the Indianapolis Museum of Art" that ran September 18, 2004 to March 20, 2005 in the Arthur M. Sackler Gallery. It was the first in a series on Asian art in American museums.

=== Acquisition ===
Mr. and Mrs. Eli Lilly gave this vase to the Herron School of Art in 1960, and it remained with the IMA during the division of the institutions. It currently has the accession number 60.116 and is on display in gallery K305.

== See also ==
- Qing porcelain
