= Courre Merlan (Whiting Chase) =

Painting by Jean Dubuffet

- Artist: Jean Dubuffet
- Year: 1964
- Medium: Oil on canvas
- Dimensions: 97.2 cm × 140 cm (38.25 in × 54 in)
- Location: Indianapolis Museum of Art, Indianapolis

Courre Merlan (Whiting Chase) is an oil painting by French artist Jean Dubuffet. It has been at the Indianapolis Museum of Art since 1992.

== Description ==
Courre Merlan (Whiting Chase) appears abstract. It consists of a large free-form shape that nearly fills the canvas and is placed on a dark, textured background. This large shape contains smaller, neatly outlined, puzzle-like shapes, most of which are white and filled with parallel lines. The main colors in the work are limited to red, white, blue, and black. These features are all characteristic of Dubuffet's style at the time. Although the shapes are abstracted, a boat or ship and fishermen can be seen, and the title suggests they are fishing for whiting. In contrast with the foreground image, the background is dark and heavily textured with brushwork.

== Historical information ==
Throughout his career, Dubuffet created his works as parts of distinct, self-contained series or cycles. Courre Merlan was a part of his Hourloupe cycle, which was the longest-running series, from July 1962 to 1974. Paintings in the Hourloupe are marked by flattened shapes, delineated with dark or black outlines, and a mostly limited color palette--red, white, blue and black. Dubuffet was initially inspired by ballpoint pen doodles he created while talking on the telephone. He believed this style reflected the way objects are seen in the mind. In the Hourloupe series, Dubuffet also veered into three-dimensional sculptures and installations. The Hourloupe cycle, and this work, also reflect Dubuffet's affinity for “art brut”—art produced by children, psychiatric patients, and other untrained artists. In addition, although Dubuffet did not consider himself a Surrealist, he was influenced by the surrealist interest in the unconscious.

Dubuffet believed that art addressed itself to the mind and not the physical world. With works such as Courre Merlan that portray objects with little or no reference to their actual colors or dimensions, he intended to prove that the world within the painting might be just as real as the physical world. Dubuffet argued that individuals could create their own versions of reality.
