= Red Kimono on the Roof =

1912 painting by John Sloan

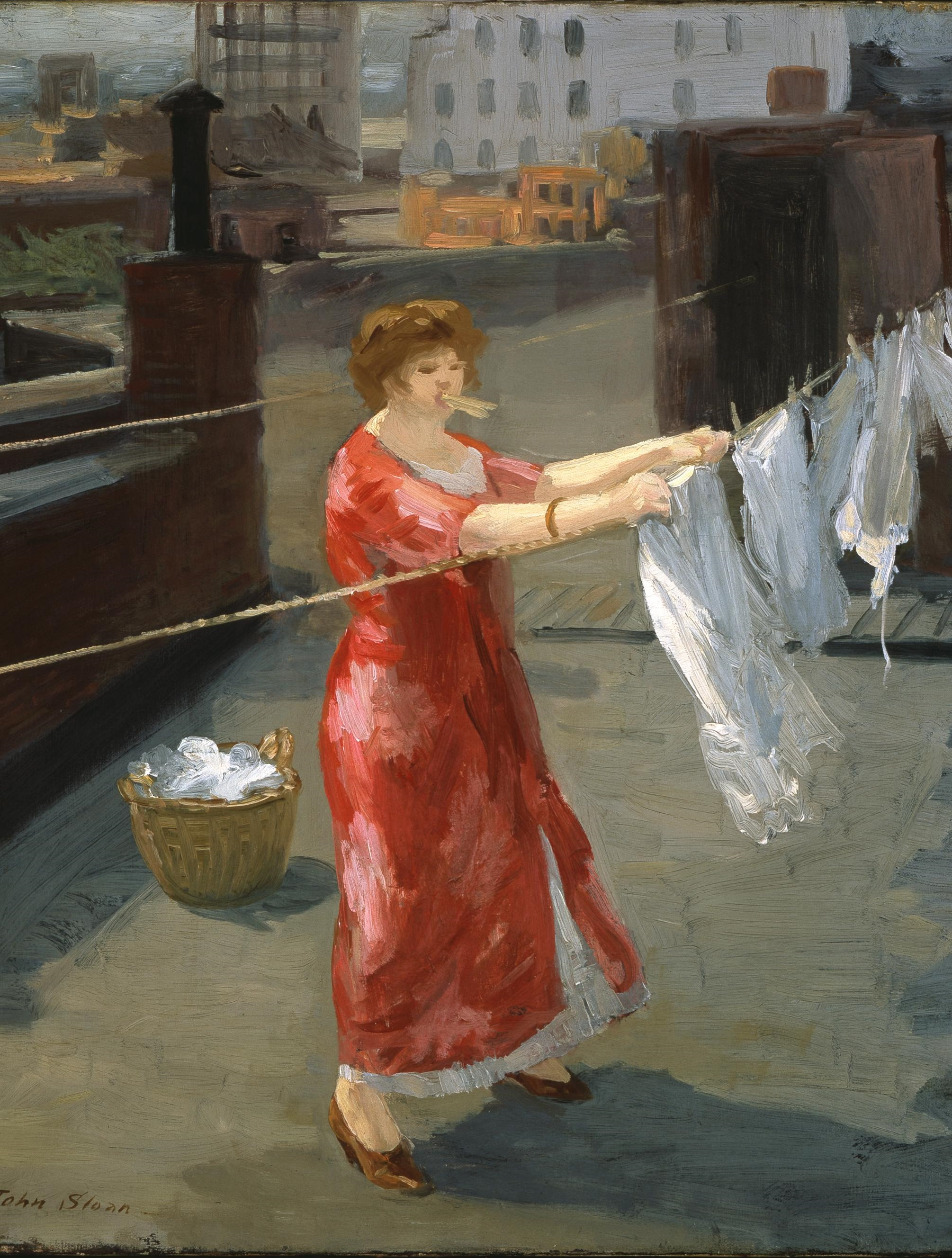
- Artist: John Sloan
- Year: 1912
- Medium: Oil on canvas
- Dimensions: 61 cm × 51 cm (24 in × 20 in)
- Location: Indianapolis Museum of Art, Indianapolis

Red Kimono on the Roof is an oil painting by American artist John Sloan, located in the Indianapolis Museum of Art, which is in Indianapolis, Indiana, USA. Painted in 1912, its down-to-earth subject matter and execution make it an excellent example of the work of the Ashcan School, which was active in New York City in the early years of the twentieth century.

== Description ==
Red Kimono on the Roof is a matter-of-fact depiction of a woman in a vibrant red wrap hanging laundry on a New York roof, clothespin in her mouth. Sloan's spontaneous brushwork give the painting a sense of immediacy, while his careful attention to light and shade suggests the passage of time. This particular slice of the Lower East Side probably caught Sloan's eye due to the kimono worn by the woman, a charmingly bohemian sartorial choice that meshed well with the novel Maratta color system Sloan had just begun using on his typically sober paintings. This painting also marks a shift from horizontal to vertical in Sloan's canvases, an artistic and perceptual shift that occurred between 1909 and 1915.

== Background information ==
Sloan was attracted to the rooftop tableaux visible from his eleventh-floor studio on Sixth Avenue in Greenwich Village. He could look down upon people unselfconsciously going about their daily business, their vivacity making them as fascinating as characters on a stage, performing for an audience of one. All the members of the Ashcan School studiously avoided sentimentality, letting their vigorous slice-of-life images speak for themselves. Even Sloan, the most politically sensitive of the group as an active socialist, refused to editorialize with his paintings.

== Location history ==
In 2008, the IMA loaned out Red Kimono on the Roof for a traveling exhibition entitled "Seeing the City: Sloan's New York." While the exhibition itself ran from October 2007 to December 2008, the process of preparing the painting for travel began over a year before then. This included everything from assessing the condition of the painting to evaluating the security systems of the other museums to crafting a personalized travel crate. The exhibition visited the Delaware Art Museum, the Westmoreland Museum of American Art, the Smart Museum of Art at the University of Chicago, and the Reynolda House.

== Acquisition ==
Red Kimono on the Roof was acquired by the IMA in 1954, courtesy of the James E. Roberts Fund. It is on view in the Urban Realism Gallery and has the acquisition number 54.55.
