= Disc Installation =

Untitled
- Artist: Robert Irwin
- Year: 1967-1969
- Type: Installation art series
- Dimensions: 140-150 cm (54-60 in)

Robert Irwin is associated with the Modern Art movement and is best known for his Installation art. Philosophers influence Irwin’s work, such as Maurice Merleau-Ponty’s ideas of engagement and interaction between the physical world and people. Irwin reflects these ideas through his disc installations. From 1967-1969 he worked on this installation, which consists of convex discs made of metal and plastic. The discs hang on a wall and are illuminated by floodlights to create the illusion of no edges. It is a play on light, dark, shadows, and the space in which the discs lie in.

== Inspiration ==
The disc installation was born from Robert Irwin’s previous works with lines and dots. He worked with lines (on canvas) from 1957 to 1964, but the “prepositional tendency had the effect of dribbling away the viewer’s presence before the canvas" (Robert Irwin). The lines led to the dots (many dots on a canvas ranging in colors which all met in the center creating the focal point), which he worked with from 1964 to 1967. But something about the dots didn’t sit right with Irwin. He began to question the use of the frame and edges. This led to his manipulation of light, dark, shadow, and the exhibition space, which gave the artwork the ability to “dissolve into its environment.”

== Composition ==
Irwin’s intention with the discs was to create a blending between light and dark resulting in an “evenness” while escaping the traditional confinements of a frame. The first experimental discs were made out of a translucent plastic to produce the least amount of contrast between the edges of the disc and the shadow the lights gave off. But it was a trial and error because the discs were too floppy to be used. It took a while searching in California for Irwin to find the right metal shop in downtown Los Angeles that was right for the job. The discs produced by this shop were made of a lightweight aluminum that were shaped by hand with the help of a machine “that consisted of just a soft-shaped steel plate and a drop hammer.” In the later years of Irwin’s work with the discs, he was able to create a plastic disc that wasn’t too floppy. To avoid the floppy problem, he used a double crowning technique which is essentially a bulge within a bulge.

The shape, three-dimensional convex circles, derived from the dot pieces. Irwin wanted them to be circular in order to avoid the corners a square or rectangle would produce. But instead of being flat it needed to be convex to deemphasize the edge. The disc was painted where the disc bulges out (point closest to the viewer) the same color as the wall (point furthest away from the viewer) to give it a floating effect. But the combination of convexity and color made it so the viewer had a difficult time determining whether the disc was convex, concave, or flat. (Originally he painted the discs with dots, but the way they turned out was unsatisfactory. He resorted to a spray painting technique, which allowed for the effect that minimized the visibility of the edge.)

The discs vary in size, but very little. (Examples of diameters: 60 3/8", 54 1/4”, 54”) They stretch out about 20 inches away from the wall.

The lighting needed for the pieces is very specific: “even, ambient, natural daylight, without any artificial supplementation.” But this lighting isn’t easy to obtain in every location, so although there are places that natural light can be used the most common light used is artificial. The artificial lighting consists of two lights on the floor and two lights on the ceiling that beam onto the disc. The shadows created by the disc are projected onto the wall to look like a “rosette of shadow.” At first, an Incandescent light bulb was used, but the yellow it produced was too warm for such a cool color of paint. Irwin moved onto Westinghouse, which was worse than the standard incandescent (in terms of yellowness). He settled on the next bulb, Sylvania, which still produced a small amount of yellow. To solve the problem, a pale blue transparent filter was attached to the bulb resulting in a cool stream of light.

Towards Irwin’s last years of working with the discs he reintroduced the line into his work. He sliced a thin three-inch wide line through the middle of the discs to add a pop of color (the gray wall) and disrupt the minimalism.

== Critical acclaim ==
“Shown correctly, Irwin’s discs are otherworldly. They seem to float ambiguously. It is the disc seeming to dematerialize or the shadows taking on volume? There is an eerie, fluid sense of density, object and shadow playing in and out of co presence. White becoming color becoming shadow of white. Self possession divulging itself.” –Lawrence Weschler commenting on Irwin’s discs

“Irwin emphasizes verbally that what he requires of the spectator is for him literally to ‘enact the process of the work’s conception’...There were of course serious problems arising out of the inevitable discrepancy between the artist’s stated demands and the actual uniformed confrontation with the works, which were, for one thing, exceedingly elegant and often ravishing beautiful; one was not necessarily inclined, at least consciously, to respond as searchingly as hoped.” –Jane Livingston’s essay on Irwin’s traveling exhibit of discs 1969

== Irwin Quotes ==
“You have to make it very clear to anyone who might read your essay, especially any young artist who might happen to pick it up, that my whole process was really an intuitive activity in which all of the time I was only putting one foot in front of the other, and that each step was not that resolved. Most of the time I didn’t have any idea where I was going; I had no real intellectual clarity as to what it was I thought I was doing. Usually it was just a straightforward commitment in terms of pursuing the particular problems or questions which had been raised in the doing of the work.” -Robert Irwin (artist)

“Visually it was very ambiguous which was more real, the object or its shadow. They were basically equal.”-Robert Irwin (artist), 1982
