= Vorhor, the Green Wave =

Painting by Georges Lacombe

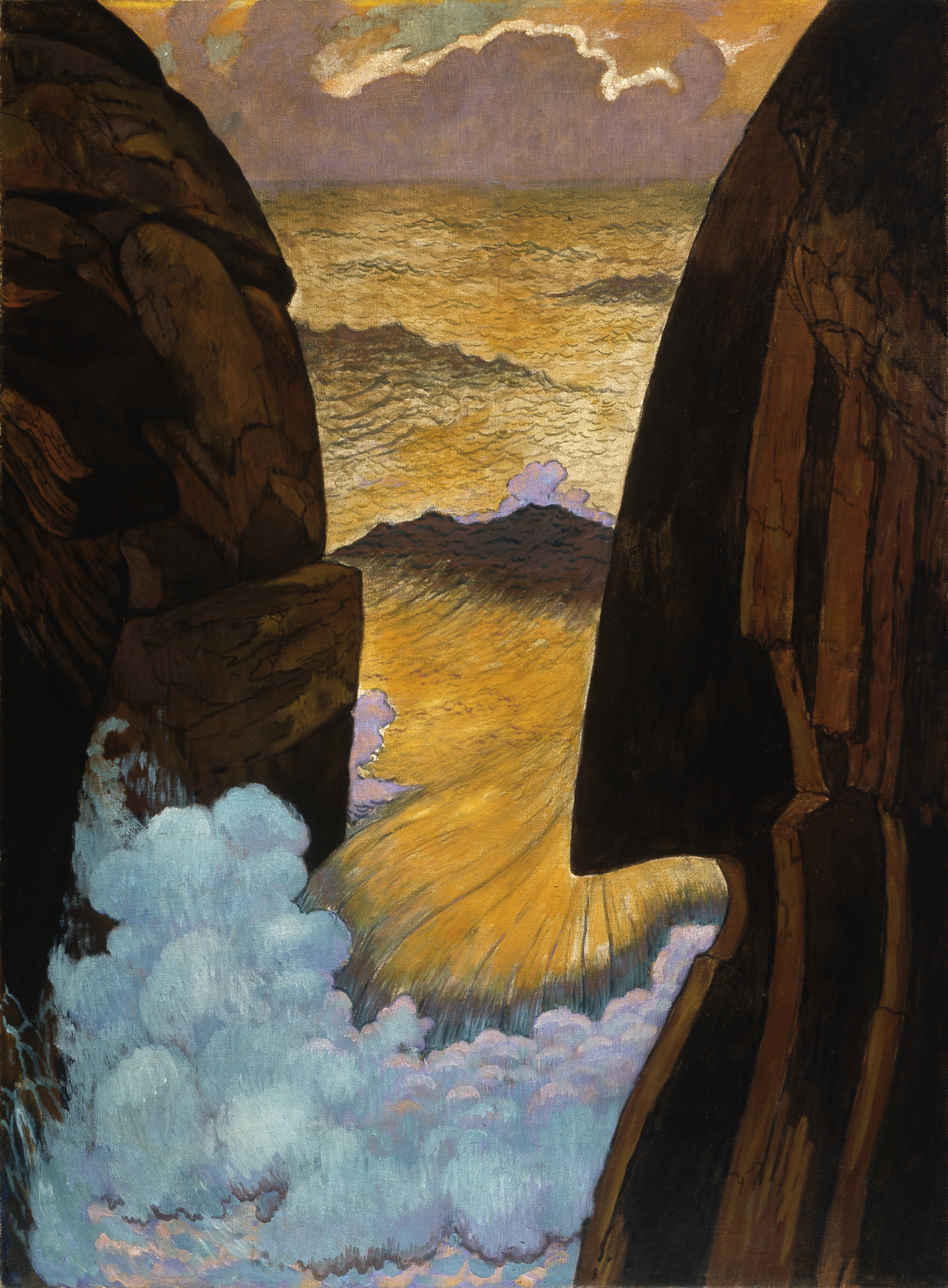
- Artist: Georges Lacombe
- Year: 1896–97
- Type: Egg tempera on canvas
- Dimensions: 100.01 cm × 72.07 cm (39.375 in × 28.375 in)
- Location: Indianapolis Museum of Art; Indianapolis

Vorhor, the Green Wave is one of the most famous paintings by French artist Georges Lacombe. It is now in the Indianapolis Museum of Art, which is in Indianapolis, Indiana. Painted 1896–97, Lacombe used egg tempera and the inspiration of Japanese prints to depict the cliffs of Vorhor in Brittany.

== Description ==
North of Pont-Aven, Lacombe found this dramatic crag overlooking the sea and rendered it even more spectacular with vivid hues of turquoise, mauve, and gold. He also anthropomorphized the rocks, finding human shapes in them, and transformed the waves into decorative patterns similar to Japanese prints. The back of the canvas bears an atelier monogram.

== Historical information ==
In 1892, Lacombe first encountered Post-Impressionism, and was immediately smitten. He fully embraced Gauguin's insistence that artists be allowed to reinterpret nature when creating a series of coastal paintings between 1893 and 1897. The influence of Symbolism on Lacombe can be seen in the foreboding with which he imbued the narrow gap and pounding waves.

=== Acquisition ===
Sylvie Mora-Lacombe inherited the painting upon her father's death. It was purchased by the IMA in 1984 with the assistance of the Alliance of the Indianapolis Museum of Art, where it was given the acquisition number 1984.202.

== See also ==
- Saintes-Maries (Van Gogh series)
