= Man and Woman (Léger) =

1921 painting by Fernand Léger

- Homme et Femme (French)
- Artist: Fernand Léger
- Year: 1921
- Type: Oil on canvas painting
- Dimensions: 92.1 cm × 65 cm (36.25 in × 25.5 in)
- Location: Indianapolis Museum of Art; Indianapolis

Man and Woman is an oil-on-canvas painting executed in 1921 by the French artist Fernand Léger. The painting is a cubist portrait of a man and a woman locked in a passionate embrace at odds with their depersonalized, industrialized setting. The painting is held by the Indianapolis Museum of Art, United States.

== Description ==
Léger rejected many aspects of cubism, such as multiple simultaneous vantage points, but retained the trait of reducing figures to their most basic, geometric components. To that end, the woman in this painting consists of curves and the color orange, while the man is depicted in columns and blue. They are scarcely distinguishable from the background, an industrial latticework of beams and girders. In this way, Léger illustrated his belief that, although it might be a struggle, humans could maintain their humanity in a mechanized age, coexisting with technology and burgeoning urbanization. Léger's technique underscores this message, with flat brushwork emulating mass production. The disjointed figures force rapid visual shifts, which simulates the increasing sensory complexity of the machine age.

== Historical information ==
Léger's battlefront experiences during World War I instilled in him the conviction that art should reflect the new, mechanized world, and be accessible to the average person. He identified strongly with the working class. Man and Woman was created in the middle of his "mechanica" period, when he created grand figures in a mechanical style.

== Acquisition ==
Man and Woman was acquired by the IMA in 1952, courtesy of the Martha Delzell Memorial Fund. It has the acquisition number 52.28.
