= Sumbanese woman's ceremonial skirt (Indianapolis Museum of Art) =

Decorative art of the Indianapolis Museum of Art

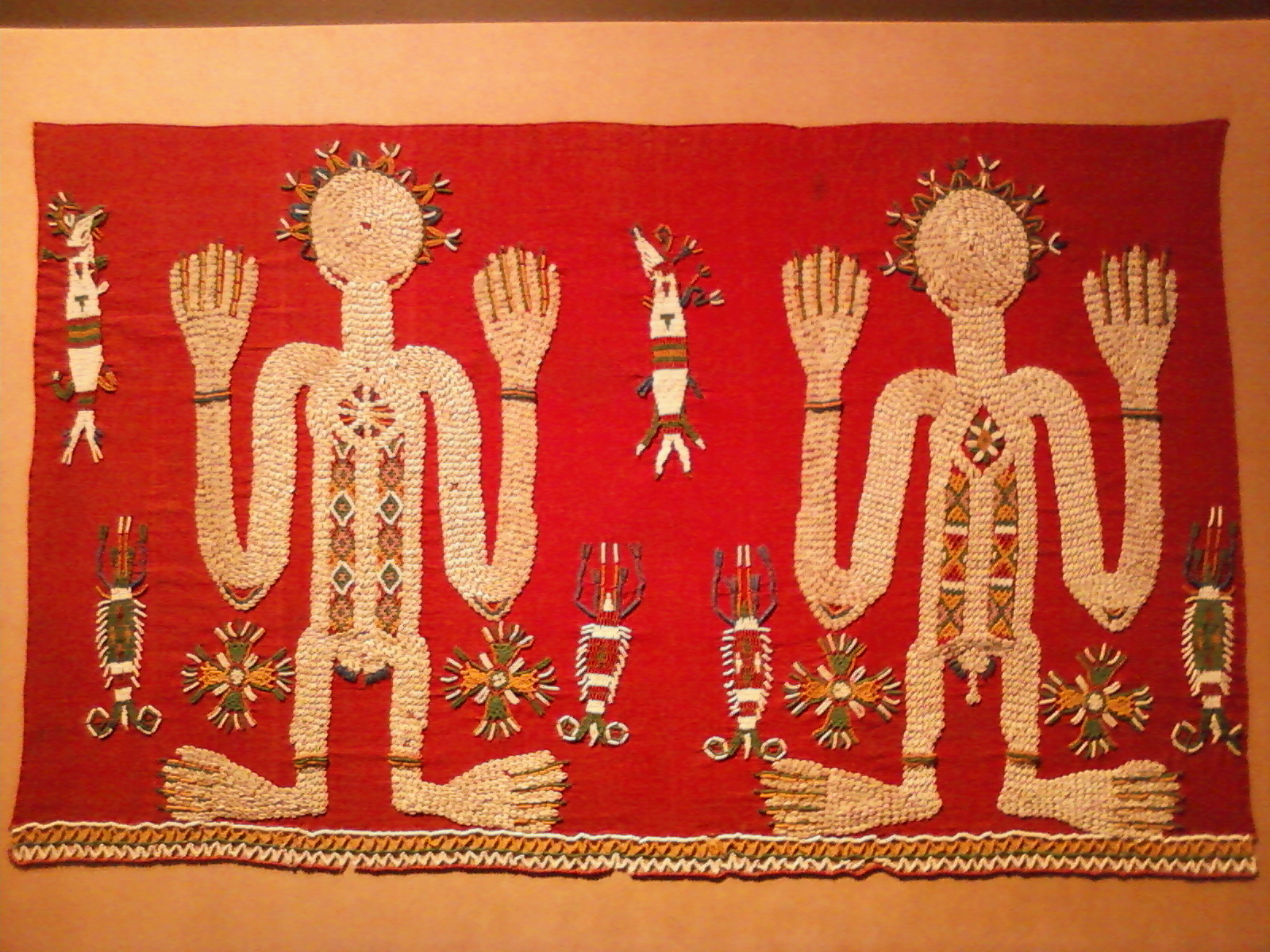
- Year: ca. 1900
- Type: textile
- Dimensions: 74 cm × 118 cm (29 in × 46.5 in)
- Location: Indianapolis Museum of Art; Indianapolis

This early twentieth century woman's ceremonial skirt from the Indonesian island of Sumba is part of the textiles collection of the Indianapolis Museum of Art, which is in Indianapolis, Indiana. Also known as a lau hada, the skirt would have been a nuptial gift for a woman of great social standing, since it is made of imported, machine-woven cotton cloth, glass trade beads, and nassa shells, which were once used as currency.

== Description ==
This skirt is densely covered in symbolic imagery. The large male and female figures, an ancestral couple, symbolize fertility and the continuity of life. In addition to their elaborate crowns, the couple's wrists, elbows, knees, and ankles are decorated, since the Sumbanese believed those regions to be energy repositories. Their stances are authoritative, with arms raised in prayer. The shrimp and lobsters on the skirt both stand for rebirth, due to their regenerative abilities. The vibrant red of the cloth itself is associated with fertility, blood, earth, and women. This combination of powerful imagery encourages fertility and a good relationship with the spirit world.

== Historical information ==
A lau hada such as this would be given to a wealthy bride on her wedding day as part of a series of ritualized gifts known as pakiri mbola or "bottom of the basket." They are rarely seen in museums, since the garments were meant to be buried with the woman who received them, announcing her lofty social status in the afterlife.

Although the imagery is deeply traditional, skirts with this level of complexity were not made prior to the nineteenth century. That is when vigorous trade with the Dutch brought in vast quantities of the glass beads and nassa shells necessary to create such a masterpiece.

== Acquisition ==
This lau hada came to the IMA in 1933 courtesy of the Eliza M. and Sarah L. Niblack Collection. It has the accession number 33.682. It is not currently on view.

== See also ==
- Textiles of Sumba
