= The Two Sisters (Lemmen) =

1894 painting by Georges Lemmen

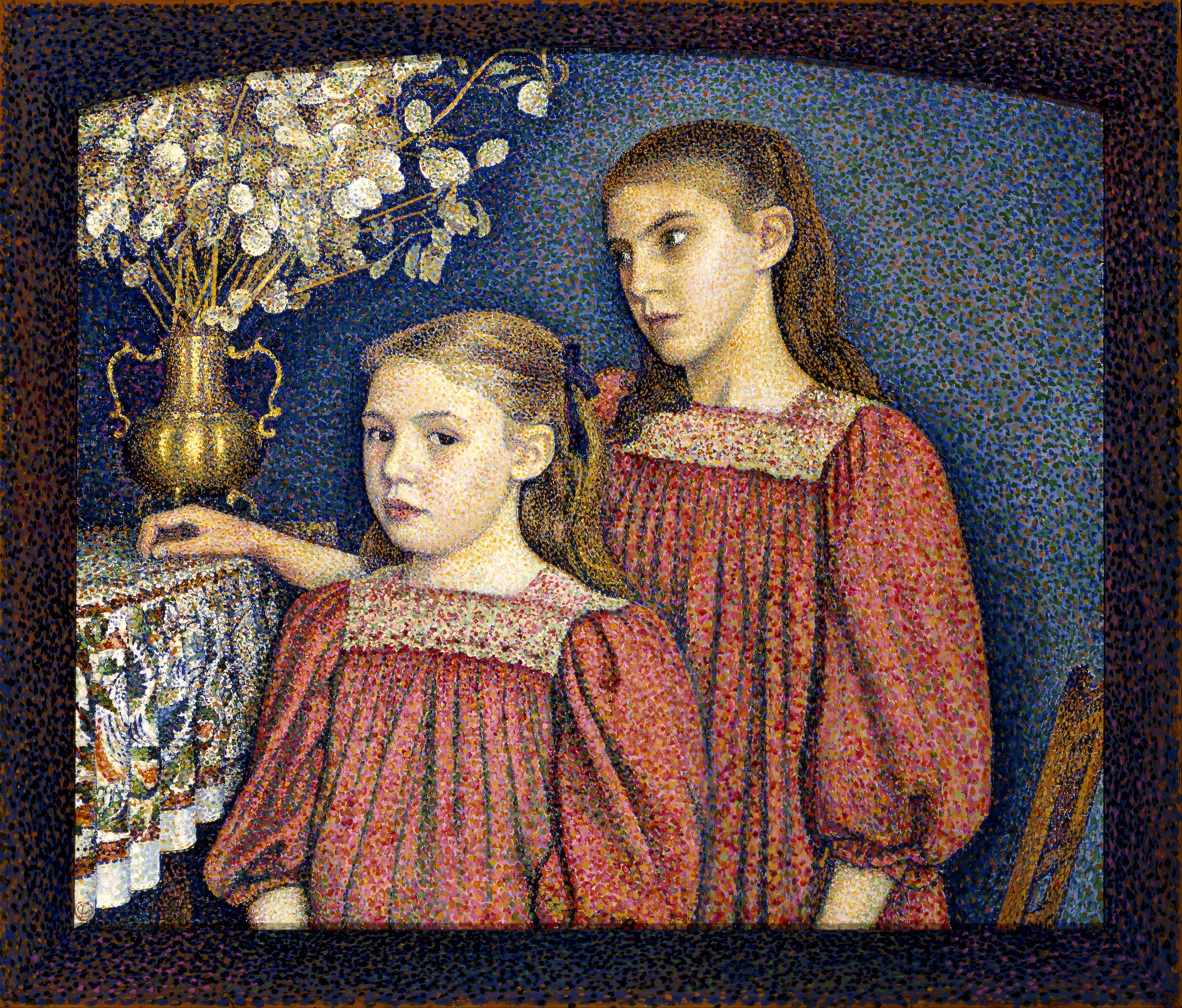
- Artist: Georges Lemmen
- Year: 1894
- Type: Oil painting on canvas
- Dimensions: 60.01 cm × 70.01 cm (23.625 in × 27.563 in)
- Location: Indianapolis Museum of Art, Indianapolis

The Two Sisters, also known as The Serruys Sisters, is an 1894 oil painting by Belgian artist Georges Lemmen, located in the Indianapolis Museum of Art, which is in Indianapolis, Indiana. It uses pointillism to depict the sisters Jenny and Berthe Serruys.

== Description ==
This double portrait of eight-year-old Jenny and twelve-year-old Berthe is typical of Lemmen's detailed, austere portraiture. He depicted the pair with penetrating gazes and a commanding presence, quite unlike the usual sentimentality of children's portraits. The painted wooden frame is original, one of the few surviving Neo-Impressionist frames. While the red of the girls' dresses and the blue of the background are the dominant colors, Lemmen used green and orange dots across the painting and the frame to enhance those hues. Utilizing the opposite ends of the color wheel means the contrast effect stimulates greater brilliance in the red and blue than they would have evoked on their own.

== Historical information ==
Lemmen was a friend of the Serruys family. His growing interest in the Arts and Crafts movement can be seen in the attention he paid to the tablecloth's pattern and money plant's twining tendrils. At the time of this portrait, he was still adhering quite closely to the rigors of Neo-Impressionism, though he would later shift to looser brushwork and division of color.

=== Acquisition ===
Edmond Serruys, the girls' father, commissioned the painting from Lemmen, then left it to Jenny Serruys Bradley, the younger subject, upon his death in 1917. It left her possession in the 1960s, traveling from galleries in London and New York to end in the collection of W.J. Holliday, who bequeathed it to the IMA in 1979. It has the acquisition number 79.317. It currently hangs in the Robert H. & Ina M. Mohlman Gallery.

== See also ==
- A Sunday Afternoon on the Island of La Grande Jatte
