= Young Woman in Blue =

Drawing by Edgar Degas

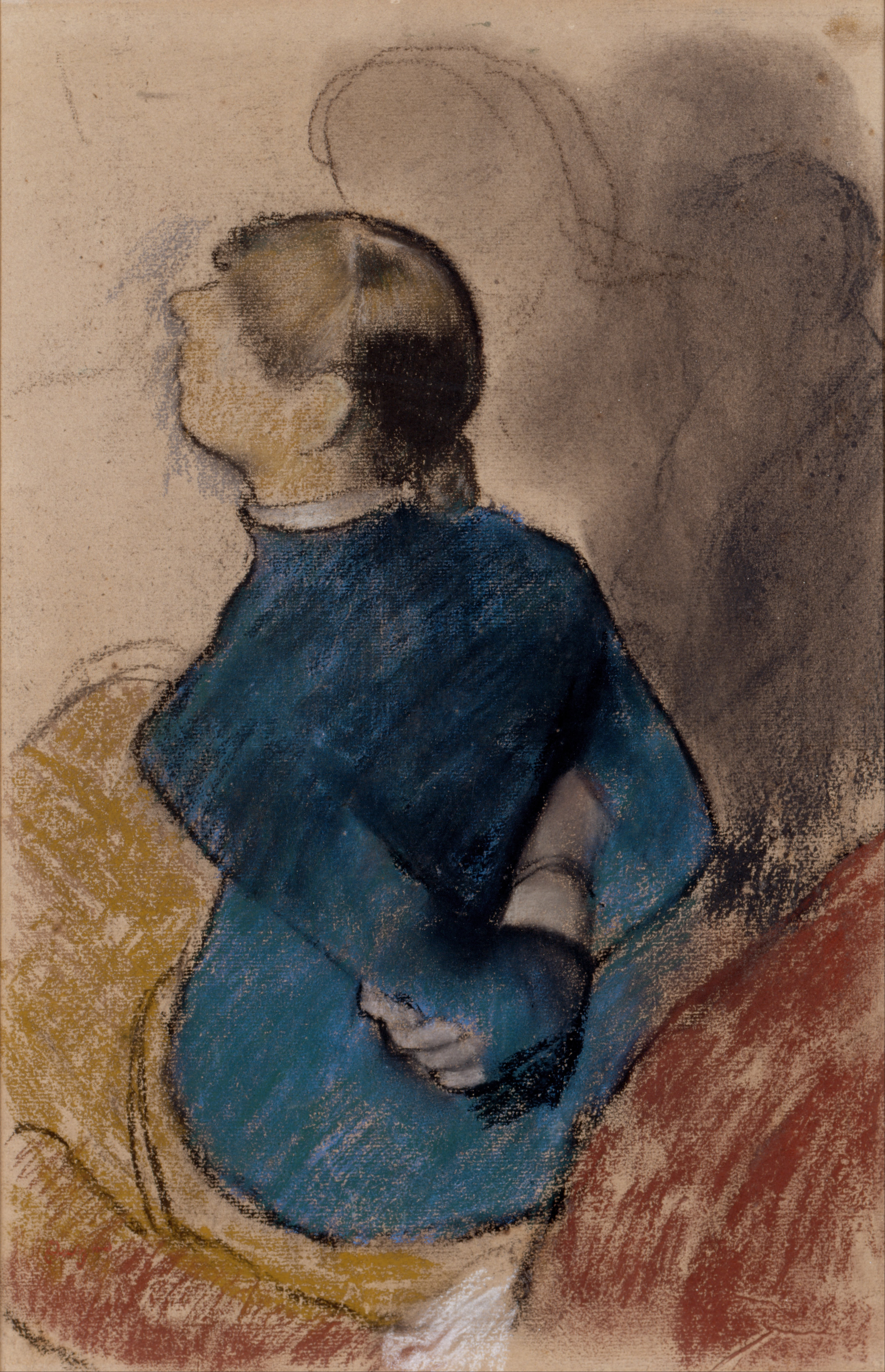
- Artist: Edgar Degas
- Year: 1884
- Type: Pastel over charcoal on buff paper
- Dimensions: 61.6 cm × 47 cm (24.25 in × 18.5 in)
- Location: Indianapolis Museum of Art, Indianapolis

Young Woman in Blue is a drawing by French artist Edgar Degas, created in 1884. It is currently in the permanent collection at the Indianapolis Museum of Art.

== Description ==
The subject appears to be a young saleswoman, observed in a Parisian hat shop. She is seen from above and behind, and her back is straitlaced and proper. Her hair is tied in a tight bun at the base of her skull, and her straight bangs are over her eyes. Her jacket is a deep blue and is the focal point of the drawing. She looks impatient, her arms crossed and her nose up in the air, and she seems to be absorbed in herself, paying little to no attention to the customers around her.

== Historical information ==
According to Mary Cassatt, Degas' protégée and friend, Degas often asked her to pose for him after going with her to the dressmaker's or the milliner's. He often asked her to assume a role or a stance he saw while out with her, especially if the pose was difficult. This separated Degas from the other Impressionists of the time, as working in a studio is decidedly not spontaneous. His focus on the figure was also decidedly not following the Impressionist school, keeping his work mainly focused on women in Parisian life.

Degas also desired to revive the pastel as an art form; a form which had fallen out of style in the 19th century.

=== Acquisition ===
Young Woman in Blue was sold at Degas' estate sale, part 2, in December 1918, after the artist's death. It was purchased by the Galerie Georges Petit, in Tabelaux. It was purchased by the Indianapolis Museum of Art in 1938, using the Delavan Smith Fund.
