= Albert Parker Niblack =

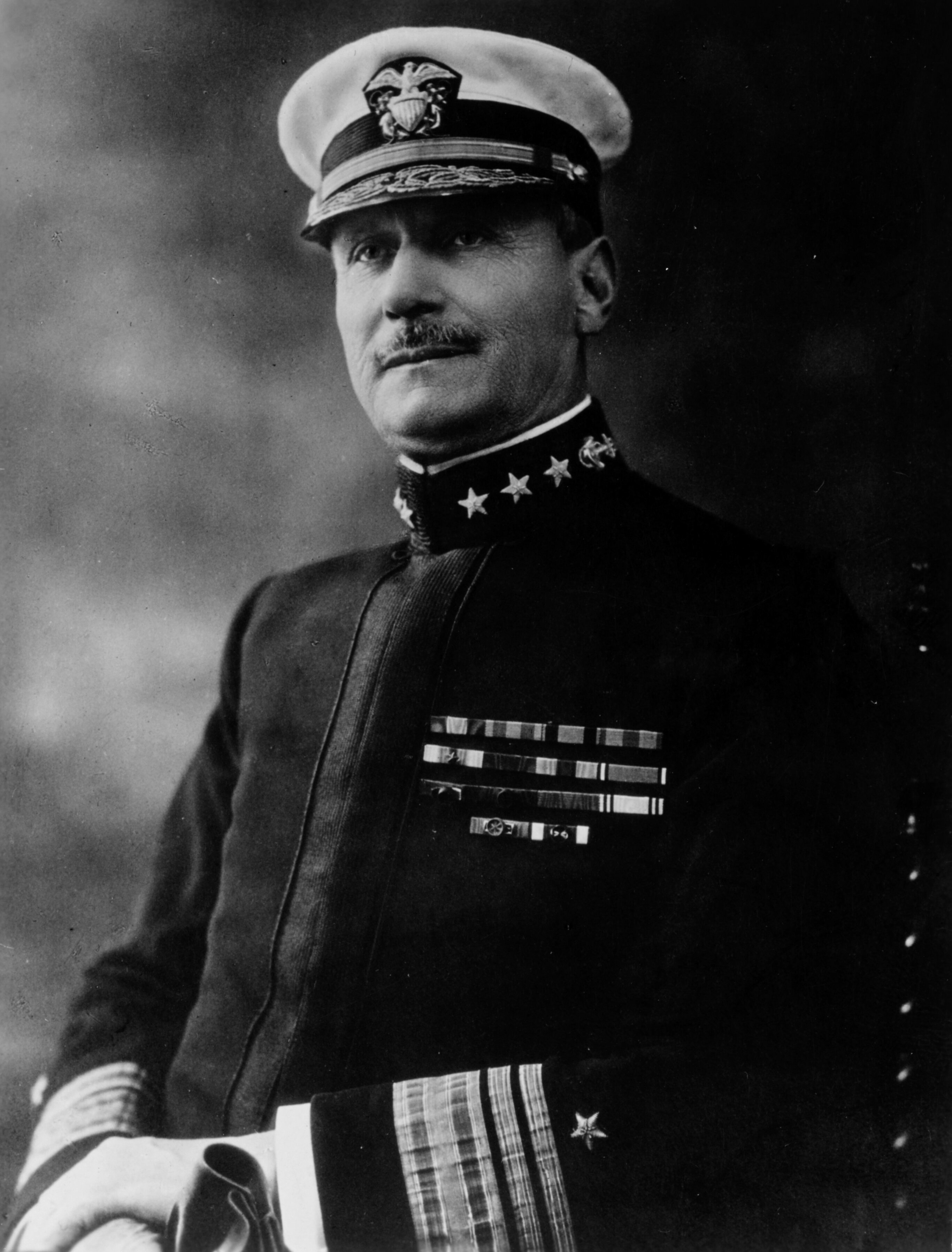
- Vice Admiral Albert P. Niblack
- Born: July 25, 1859; Vincennes, Indiana, U.S.
- Died: August 20, 1929 (aged 70); Monte Carlo, Monaco
- Military career
- Allegiance: United States of America
- Branch: United States Navy
- Service years: 1880–1923
- Rank: Vice Admiral
- Conflicts: World War I

Albert Parker Niblack (July 25, 1859 – August 20, 1929) was a United States admiral who served during the First World War. In 1940, the USS Niblack (DD-424), sponsored by his widow, was named in his honor.

== Biography ==
Niblack was born in Vincennes, Indiana. He was appointed to the United States Naval Academy September 22, 1876; graduated June 10, 1880; and was assigned to Lackawanna.

During the decades that followed, Niblack served on many ships and held several interesting posts ashore including work with the Smithsonian Institution, duty in the Bureau of Navigation, and a tour in the Office of Naval Intelligence. As part of his work with the Smithsonian, he wrote one of the first ethnographic accounts on the Haida and Tlingit of Southern Alaska and Northern British Columbia. He won his first command, Iroquois, February 10, 1904, and subsequently commanded some of the Navy's most famous ships including USS Hartford and USS Olympia. He was naval attaché to Argentina, Brazil, Chile, Germany, and the Netherlands, and served as a member of the General Board.

When the United States entered World War I, he took command of Division 1, U.S. Atlantic Fleet, with Alabama (BB-8) as flagship April 5, 1917, and was appointed Rear Admiral August 31. Niblack assumed command of Squadron 2, Patrol Force, October 23, and served in this post through the Armistice. In January 1919 he was sent to Venice, Italy to command the U.S. Naval Forces in the Eastern Mediterranean onboard USS Olympia. He became Director of Naval Intelligence March 1, 1919, and Naval Attaché in London August 6, 1920. As Vice Admiral, he commanded U.S. Naval Forces in European waters January 15, 1921 to June 17, 1922. After commanding the 6th Naval District at Charleston, S.C., Vice Admiral Niblack retired July 25, 1923.

In 1927 Niblack was appointed head of the International Hydrographic Bureau in Monaco, a post he held until his death.

He was a member of the Military Order of the Carabao.

He died at Monte Carlo, in Monaco on August 20, 1929.

== Publications ==
- Albert P. Niblack, "The Coast Indians of Southern Alaska and Northern British Columbia", Annual Report of the U.S. National Museum for the Year 1888 (Washington, D.C.: Smithsonian Institution, 1890).
- Albert P. Niblack, Putting Cargoes Through: The U.S.Navy at Gibraltar During the First World War, 1917-1919, Edited with an Introduction by John B. Hattendorf. (Gibraltar: Calpe Press, 2018).
