= Harrison Eiteljorg =

American philanthropist and patron of the arts

- Born: October 1, 1903; Indianapolis, Indiana
- Died: April 29, 1997 (aged 93); Indianapolis, Indiana
- Resting place: Crown Hill Cemetery and Arboretum, Section 61, Lot 8; 39.8191346°N 86.1769761°W

Harrison Eiteljorg (October 1, 1903, in Indianapolis – April 29, 1997, in Indianapolis) was an American philanthropist, businessman, and patron of the arts. The Eiteljorg Museum of American Indians and Western Art was named after him for his donation of visual arts by indigenous peoples of the Americas and Western American paintings and sculptures. Until his death in 1997, Eiteljorg served as chairman of the museum's board.

Eiteljorg was for several years a successful businessman in the mining industry. He served as board chair for the Indianapolis Museum of Art and also donated 1,200 pieces of African art and artifacts to their collection in 1989. There is also a collection of African art donated by Eiteljorg at Butler University in Indianapolis.

He married Edith Morgan Eiteljorg. They divorced in 1954.
