= Reflections =

Reflections may refer to:

== Books and magazines ==
- Reflections; or Sentences and Moral Maxims, a series of books (1665–1678) by François de La Rochefoucauld
- Reflections (Shah), by Idries Shah
- Reflections, an alumni publication of Lubbock Christian University
- Reflections, a publication of Yale Divinity School
- Reflections, an academic journal on writing and public rhetoric published by New City Community Press
- Reflections: The Arts and Sciences Forum, a biannual publication of the University of New Haven from 1987-2015

== Film and television ==
=== Film ===
- Reflections (1964 film) or Dry Summer, a Turkish film directed by Metin Erksan
- Reflections (1984 film), a British drama directed by Kevin Billington
- Reflections (1987 film), a Yugoslavian psychological horror film directed by Goran Marković
- Reflections (2005 film), an Indian short silent film by Bejoy Nambiar

=== Television ===
- Reflections (TV series), a 1962 Canadian classical-music television series
- "Reflections" (The Killing), a 2012 episode of the American television drama series The Killing
- "Reflections" (TMNT 2003), a 2004 episode of the cartoon program Teenage Mutant Ninja Turtles
- "Reflections" (Star Trek: Lower Decks), a 2022 episode of the animated series Star Trek: Lower Decks

== Music ==
- Reflections Records, a Dutch record label

=== Bands ===
- Reflections (Minnesota band), an American metalcore band formed in 2010
- The Reflections (Detroit band), a doo-wop group formed in the early 1960s
- The Reflections (Indianapolis band), a vocal group formed in the early 1960s
- The Reflections, a soul band from Harlem, New York also known for backing Melba Moore
- The Reflections, the Canadian backing band for Chad Allan, later known as The Guess Who
- Reflections, a solo project of Clint Newsom of the American band Rhythm of Black Lines

=== Albums ===
- Reflections (Steve Lacy album), 1959
- Reflections (Stan Getz album), 1964
- Reflections (Abdullah Ibrahim album), 1965
- Reflections (Terry Knight and the Pack album), 1967
- Reflections (The Supremes album), 1968
- Reflections (Manos Hatzidakis album), 1970
- Reflections (The 5th Dimension album), 1971
- Reflections (Jerry Garcia album), 1976
- Reflections (Andy Williams album), 1977
- Reflections (Chet Atkins and Doc Watson album), 1980
- Reflections (Akira Terao album), 1981
- Reflections (Gil Scott-Heron album), 1981
- Reflections (Rick James album), 1984
- Reflections (Hariharan album), 1988
- Reflections (1989 Frank Morgan album), 1989
- Reflections (Debby Boone album), 1989
- Reflections (The Judds album), 1994
- Reflections (Paul Young album), 1994
- Reflections (Bobo Stenson album), 1995
- Reflections (After 7 album), 1995
- Reflections (The Carpenters album), 1998
- Reflections (Apocalyptica album), 2003
- Reflections (B.B. King album), 2003
- Reflections (Paul van Dyk album), 2003
- Reflections (Miriam Makeba album), 2004
- Reflections (2006 Frank Morgan album), 2006
- Reflections (Sandra album), 2006
- Reflections (A Retrospective), a 2006 greatest hits album by Mary J. Blige
- Reflections (The Temptations album)
- Reflections (Graham Nash album), 2009
- Reflections (Kurt Rosenwinkel album), 2009
- Reflections (S.E.X. Appeal album), 2010
- Reflections (Candice Night album), 2011
- Reflections (Don Williams album), 2014
- Reflections (EP), 2014 EP by MisterWives
- Reflections, a 2016 album by X-Panda
- Reflections (Hannah Diamond album), 2019
- Reflections (Timo Andres, Conor Hanick, and Sufjan Stevens album), 2023
- Reflections (Blue album), 2026
- Reflections (From Ashes to New album) (2026)

=== Songs ===
- "Reflections" (The Supremes song), 1967
- "Reflections" (Bliss n Eso song), 2010
- "Reflections" (MisterWives song), 2014
- "Reflections (Care Enough)", a 2001 single by Mariah Carey
- "Reflections", a song performed by Jody Miller

== Other uses ==
- Reflection (mathematics), a transformation of a space
- Reflections (concert residency), a concert residency by Regine Velasquez in Manila
- Reflections (Amiga software), a 3D raytracing and modeling software
- Reflections (Dove), a 1935 painting by Arthur Dove
- Ubisoft Reflections, formerly Reflections Interactive, a games developer
- Reflections, a 1942 radio program starring Frank Sinatra

== See also ==
- Reflection (disambiguation)
- Reflexive (disambiguation)
