= NBKC Bank =

American bank

NBKC Bank (stylized nbkc bank) is a U.S. community bank with a nationwide online presence and known for its Banking as a Service is headquartered in Overland Park, Kansas. It offers comprehensive financial services, including deposit solutions like checking and savings accounts, credit services including home mortgages, and business loans. Its founding mission is to make banking simpler and more transparent for customers.

== History ==
nbkc bank is a state-chartered bank that is governed by FDIC. It was founded in 1999 as Horizon National Bank, initially focused on nationwide online mortgage origination during the early expansion of internet-based financial services.

The bank rebranded in 2004 to National Bank of Kansas City, reflecting a broader shift beyond mortgage lending into full-service banking.

During the 2000s and early 2010s, the bank expanded its product offerings to include consumer, commercial, and community banking services while maintaining a national mortgage platform. In 2015, the institution adopted the name nbkc bank as part of a rebranding effort aligned with its growing emphasis on digital banking and simplified customer experience.

As part of its fintech strategy, nbkc bank launched the Fountain City Fintech accelerator in 2018 to support early-stage financial technology companies and expand partnerships within the sector,^{8} resulting in the platform for nbkc’s Banking as a Service offering.

By 2020, nbkc bank had originated more than 20,000 mortgages totaling approximately $7.1 billion, reflecting its continued strength in nationwide home lending.

Over time, the bank diversified its business model to include online consumer banking, commercial banking in the Kansas City metropolitan area, and banking-as-a-service (BaaS) offerings for financial technology companies.

By 2022, nbkc bank reported assets exceeding $1 billion and had evolved into a diversified financial institution combining regional banking operations with national digital banking and fintech partnership capabilities. nbkc bank has been recognized as one of Kansas City's strongest banks with $1 billion or more in assets.

In 2022, nbkc bank was ranked 49th as the fastest growing company in Ingram’s Corporate 100 report.

In 2026, nbkc bank purchased a building that will serve as their new headquarters based in Overland Park, Kansas. The bank will move into the new building in 2027.

== Operations ==
The bank's operations are divided into several key business segments, ranging from traditional consumer deposit-banking to business banking. The bank offers a digital-first approach through its digital ecosystem that includes a mobile application and an online portal that support real-time fund transfers, mobile check deposits, and automated loan approvals, as well as access through multiple banking/fintech platforms that offer no or low fees, no minimum balance required and a streamlined bank account opening process. As of 2025, the institution maintains a physical presence through a network of four retail branches, with nationwide access to more than 90,000 ATMs globally through Moneypass and Atleos’ Allpoint networks.

The bank is recognized in the top 50 lenders in the country for VA home loans.

Primary business lines

The bank operates through four main divisions:

- Consumer Banking: Provides personal financial services, including savings and checking accounts, mortgages, and personal loans.
- Home Lending: Include a primary residential home loan, refinancing, home equity loans.
- Business Banking: Includes business checking, money market and CD accounts with no monthly service fees.
- Commercial Banking: Focuses on business lending, lines of credit, commercial real estate lending and specialized lending for small and mid-sized enterprises (SMEs) and large corporations, as well as Autobooks for invoicing/payments.

Banking as a Service (BaaS)

Expanding beyond traditional banking, nbkc bank is a Banking as a Service (BaaS) provider. This operation involves white-labeling the bank's regulated infrastructure—such as its banking license and core processing systems—to non-bank entities. The bank has also collaborated with financial technology platforms and consumer financial applications, such as Acorns, Betterment, Tilt and Gusto as part of its BaaS model, contributing to deposit growth and national expansion.
