= Reflected (disambiguation) =

To be reflected is to undergo a change in direction at an interface between two different media.

Reflected may also refer to:

- Reflected: Greatest Hits Vol. 2, a 2006 country album
- "Reflected" (song), a 1969 psychedelic rock song

== See also ==
- Reflection (disambiguation)
- Reflector (disambiguation)
