= Arthur Dove =

American abstract painter (1880–1946)

Arthur Garfield Dove
- Born: August 2, 1880; Canandaigua, New York, US
- Died: November 23, 1946 (aged 66); Huntington, New York, US
- Known for: Modernism, abstract art
- Relatives: Toni Dove (granddaughter)

Arthur Garfield Dove (August 2, 1880 – November 23, 1946) was an American artist. An early American modernist, he is often considered the first American abstract painter. Dove used a wide range of media, sometimes in unconventional combinations, to produce his abstractions and his abstract landscapes. Me and the Moon from 1937 is a good example of an Arthur Dove abstract landscape and has been referred to as one of the culminating works of his career. Dove made a series of experimental collages in the 1920s. He also experimented with techniques, combining paints like hand mixed oil or tempera over a wax emulsion as exemplified in Dove's 1938 painting Tanks, in the collection of the Boston Museum of Fine Arts.

== Early life and education ==
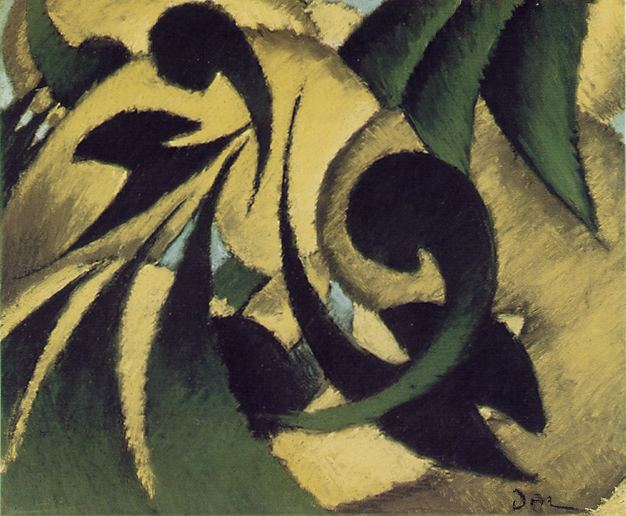
Dove's Nature Symbolized No. 2, c. 1911, a pastel on paper, at the Art Institute of Chicago

Dove was born to a wealthy family in Canandaigua, New York. His parents, William George and Anna Elizabeth, were of English ancestry. William Dove was interested in politics and named his son Arthur Garfield, after the Republican candidates for president and vice-president in the 1880 election, James Garfield and Chester Arthur, who ultimately won the vote. Arthur Dove grew up loving the outdoors on a farm; however, his father was a very successful businessman who owned a brickyard (along with city real estate) and expected his son to become wealthy. Dove's childhood interests included playing the piano, painting lessons, and pitching on a high school baseball team. As a child, he was befriended by a neighbor, Newton Weatherby, a naturalist who took him along on hunting, fishing, and camping excursions conducive to Dove's appreciation of nature. Weatherby was also an amateur painter who gave Dove pieces of leftover canvas to work with.

Dove attended Hobart College and Cornell University, where he enrolled in elective art classes. He graduated from Cornell in 1903. Dove was chosen to illustrate the Cornell University yearbook. Dove's illustrations proved popular by bringing life to the characters and situations depicted. After graduation, he became a well known commercial illustrator for Harper's Magazine and The Saturday Evening Post in New York City. Dove's parents were upset at his choice to become an artist instead of a more profitable profession that his Ivy League degree would have enabled, and they would prove unsympathetic to the difficulties that came with a career in art.

== Career ==
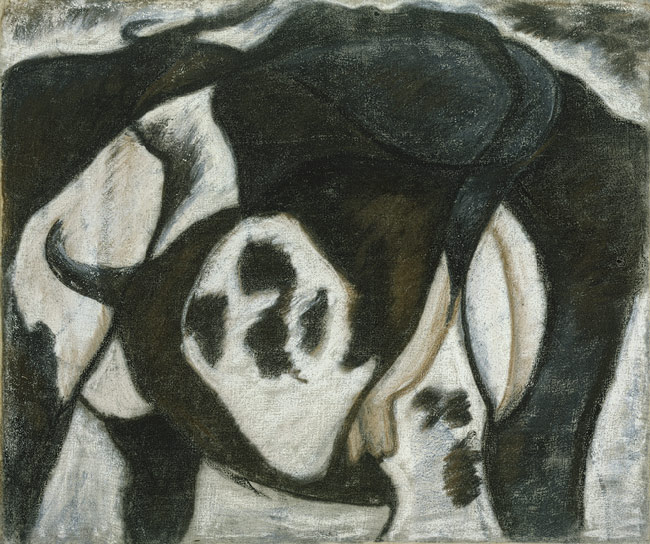
Arthur Dove, Cow, 1914, pastel on canvas, 45.1 x 54.6 cm, Metropolitan Museum of Art, New York

In 1907, Dove and his first wife, Florence, traveled to France and moved to Paris, then the world's art capital. They made short trips to both Italy and Spain. While there, Dove joined a group of experimental artists from the United States, which included Alfred Henry Maurer. Dove and Maurer remained friends until Maurer's suicide in 1932. While in Europe, Dove was introduced to new painting styles, in particular the Fauvist works of Henri Matisse, and he exhibited at the annual Autumn Salon in 1908 and 1909. Feeling a clearer sense as an artist, he returned to New York. His return to commercial illustration was unsatisfying, so Dove moved out of New York to make a living off farming and fishing while devoting the rest of his time to painting. His son, William C. Dove, was born on July 4, 1909.

When Dove returned to America in 1909 he met Alfred Stieglitz, probably by way of Maurer's written introduction. Stieglitz was a well known photographer and gallery owner who was very active in promoting modern art in America, including works by European artists that had never been seen before in the U.S. Dove decided to quit working as an illustrator but was in need of artistic identity along with emotional bolstering and Stieglitz filled both these roles. The photographer was 16 years older than Dove and his urban, Jewish and European cultural roots were in contrast to Dove's rural Anglo-Saxon Protestant heritage. Dove was said to be gentle, quiet, and a good friend while Stieglitz was known as being argumentative and shrewd. They found their common ground in the idea that art forms should embody modern spiritual values, not materialism and tradition. With Stieglitz's support, Dove produced what are known as the first purely abstract paintings to come out of America. Dove's works were based on natural forms and he referred to his type of abstraction as “extraction” where, in essence, he extracted the essential forms of a scene from nature.

Dove exhibited his works at Stieglitz's 291 gallery in 1910 as part of the show "Younger American Painters", which also included Dove's old friend Maurer. Dove showed one painting, a large still life painted in France entitled “The Lobster”, which would be his last representational work. Stieglitz provided Dove with his first one-man show in 1912 at the 291. The show, which included a group of Dove's pastels that came to be known as "The Ten Commandments", was the first public exhibition of abstract art by an American. In the two years after meeting Stieglitz, Dove became a leader in international art developments. From 1912 to 1946 Dove showed his work annually at Stieglitz's galleries: 291, Intimate Gallery, and An American Place. Dove used a wide range of media over the course of his career, sometimes in unconventional combinations. During the 1920s Dove made many works on paper such as the pastel on paper, Nature Symbolized (or Reefs) from 1924. As stated above Dove did experimental collage works in the 1920s in works like The Critic, 1925, and The Intellectual 1925; and he experimented with techniques, combining paints like oil and/or tempera over a wax emulsion. Tanks, 1938 is an example of oil over a wax emulsion; commenting about Tanks, the Boston Museum of Fine Arts says: Set off by a halo of pale gray, the quivering structures almost seem to dematerialize and merge into the surrounding scenery, yet at the same time, they retain their hulking forms.

The Critic (1925), Whitney Museum of American Art, New York. Dove did a series of experimental collage works in the 1920s.

In spite of support from various members of the art community, it was often necessary for Dove to earn money through farming, fishing and commercial illustration. Dove's most consistent supporter was Duncan Phillips, founder of the Phillips Collection in Washington, D.C., which now holds the majority of Dove's work. Dove's work convinced Philips that abstract was an artistic process, not just an art style. Stieglitz's gallery was first visited by Phillips because of Dove, and he continued to return to see Dove's work. In exchange for first choice of paintings from each exhibition, Phillips paid Dove a stipend of $50.00 a month. Dove met Phillips only once in his lifetime, in 1936. In 1937 Phillips purchased Goin Fishin for $2,000.00, then the largest sum paid for any of Dove's work. Phillips also purchased “Huntington Harbor 1.” Dove produced about twenty-five assemblages between 1924 and 1930.

Tanks (1938), oil over wax emulsion, Boston Museum of Fine Arts

Dove spent seven years on a houseboat called Mona with Helen Torr, known as "Reds" for the fiery color of her hair. Torr was also a painter. Although the psychological consequences benefited Dove's art, his life with Torr was difficult. Florence Dove had never cared about Dove's passion for art, and was more socially inclined. After 25 years of marriage, Dove left Florence. Florence would not grant him a divorce and flatly refused to let him see his son. When he departed, he left behind everything except his copies of Camera Work and Stieglitz's letters.

When Florence died unexpectedly, Dove paid $250 for the funeral expenses and sent flowers, but did not go to the funeral in Geneva. Although distressed about her death, he was now able to see his son and marry Torr. For the first time in eight years, Dove met with his then nineteen-year-old son, Bill, who was also an artist. The two established a friendship and later in life his son helped Dove with creating a technique for silvering frames.

Dove and Torr were not able to wed immediately as Torr had not divorced her first husband. They did eventually marry in April 1932 in the New York City Hall with a brief service and using a dimestore ring. Dove identified himself as a "frame maker" on his marriage registry. The 1933 Gallery 291 exhibition was the only time Stieglitz allowed Torr and Dove to exhibit together. "Seven Americans" brought Dove back into the coverage of major newspapers and art magazines, as well as back into the public eye. His work influenced later abstract landscape painters, such as Georgia O'Keeffe and Julian Hatton, in having "an unbridled love of pure, hot color."

=== Arthur Dove-Helen Torr Cottage ===
- Arthur Dove-Helen Torr Cottage
- U.S. National Register of Historic Places
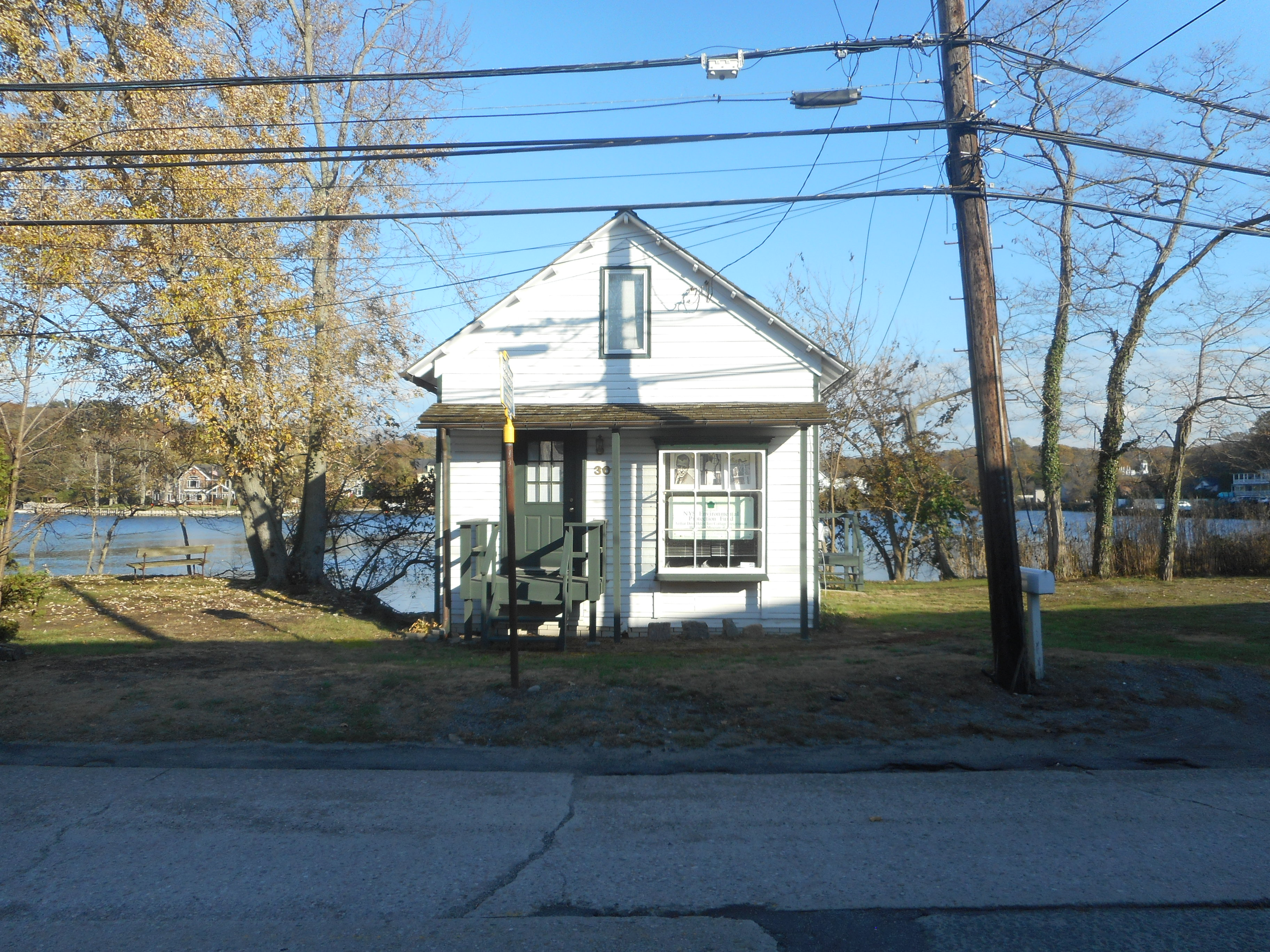
- The Dove-Torr Cottage from across Centershore Road in November 2017
- Location: 30 Centershore Rd., Centerport, New York
- Coordinates: 40°53′16″N 73°22′21″W
- Area: less than one acre
- Built: 1938
- Architectural style: Late Victorian
- NRHP reference No.: 99001682
- Added to NRHP: January 28, 2000

In July 1924, when Arthur Dove and Helen Torr sailed into Huntington Harbor aboard their 42-foot yawl, Mona, they could not have anticipated the extent to which Long Island's North Shore would inspire some of their greatest paintings. They lived in Halesite until the Great Depression when both Dove and Torr moved back to Dove's estate located in Geneva.

Wishing to return to Long Island, in 1938 the couple moved back into their first home, a former post office and general store on Center Shore Road in Centerport, New York. They purchased the house for $980.00. The tiny, one-room cottage stood on the edge of the Titus Mill Pond. Almost immediately, Dove was found to have pneumonia; he eventually suffered from a heart attack and was diagnosed with a debilitating kidney disorder. In terrible health for the remainder of his days, he lived quietly, finally able to devote himself entirely to painting, and focus on the inspiration of his surroundings and his home. Some of the most powerful paintings of his career, including Indian Summer, were painted in Centerport. Torr remained in the house on the millpond but never painted again. Helen Torr died in 1967. In 1979, her works and Dove's were hung together in the Museum of Modern Art in New York.

The Arthur Dove-Helen Torr Cottage was added to the National Register of Historic Places in 2000.

== Illness and death ==
Dove suffered from heart disease and Bright's disease through the late 1930s. He suffered a heart attack in 1939 and his health never fully recovered. In 1946 Dove had his last show with nine new paintings and made his final visit to the gallery and saw Stieglitz for the last time. In July of that year their first grandchild Toni was born. A little more than a month after the show closed in July, Stieglitz died of heart failure. Badly shaken from his friend's death, Dove lived for only four more months. Although he became partially paralyzed by a stroke, he continued with Torr's help guiding the brush, painting until he collapsed and died at Huntington Hospital. Arthur Dove died on November 23, 1946, following a second heart attack and kidney failure. He was interred at the Memorial Cemetery of St. John's Church in Cold Spring Harbor, New York. In October, just before his death, Dove wrote to Phillips for the last time:

You have no idea what sending on those checks to me at this time. After fighting for an idea all your life I realize that your backing has saved it for me and meant to thank you with all my heart and soul for what you have done. It has been marvelous. So many letters have been written and not mailed and owing to having been in bed a great deal of time this summer, the paintings were about all I could muster up enough energy to do what I considered the best of my ability. Just before Stieglitz’s death I took some paintings to him that I considered as having something new in the. He immediately walked right up to them and spoke of the new ideas. His intuition in that way was remarkable and I am so glad to have been allowed to live during his and your lifetimes. It has been a great privilege for which I am truly thankful.

Arthur Dove's granddaughter is the interactive artist Toni Dove.

The Estate of Arthur Dove is represented by the Terry Dintenfass Gallery.

In 2017, it was announced that Geneva, New York, would receive economic revitalization funding that would, in part, assist with rehabilitating the 1878 Dove Block building, once Dove's studio in the 1930s. The Landmark Society of Western New York had previously announced that the historic Dove Block building was on its "Five to Revive for 2016."

== Selected works ==
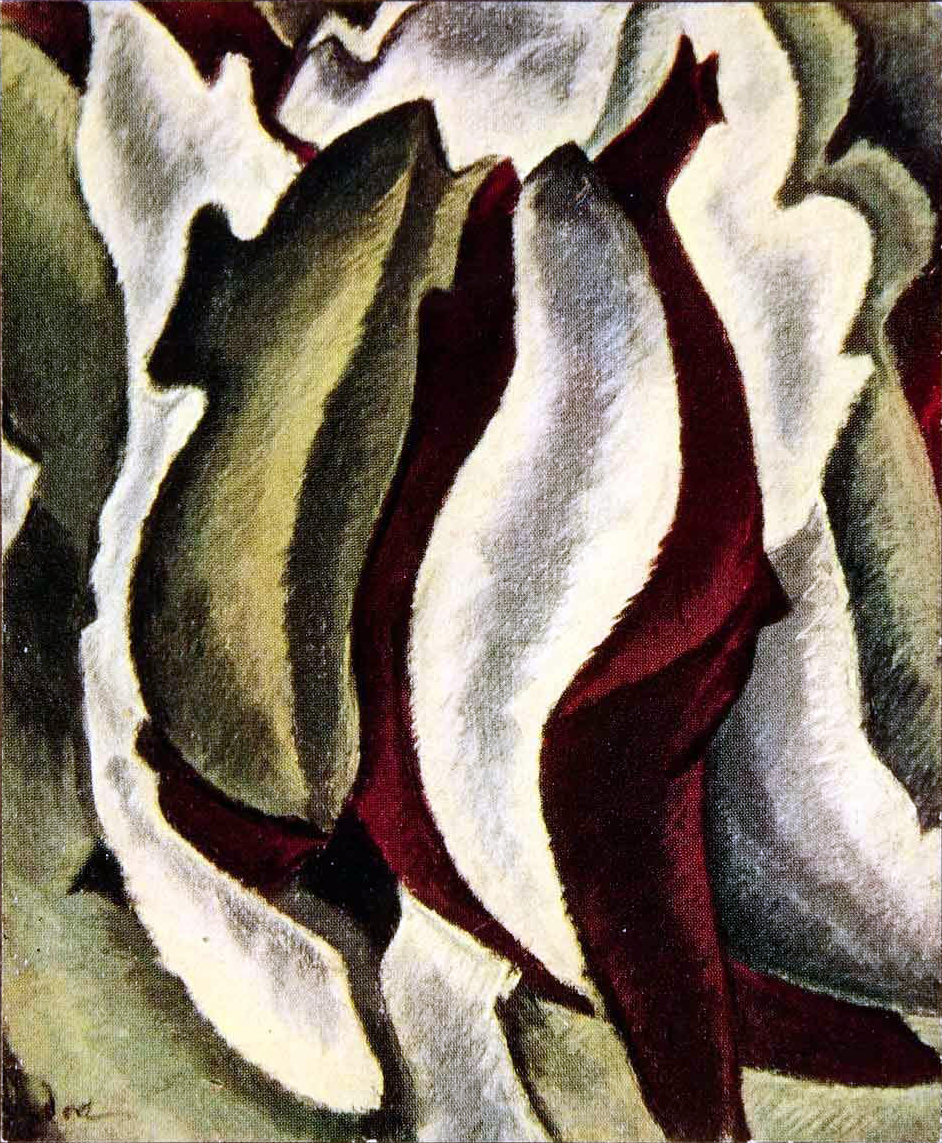
Based on Leaf Forms and Spaces, 1911–12, pastel on unidentified support (now lost)

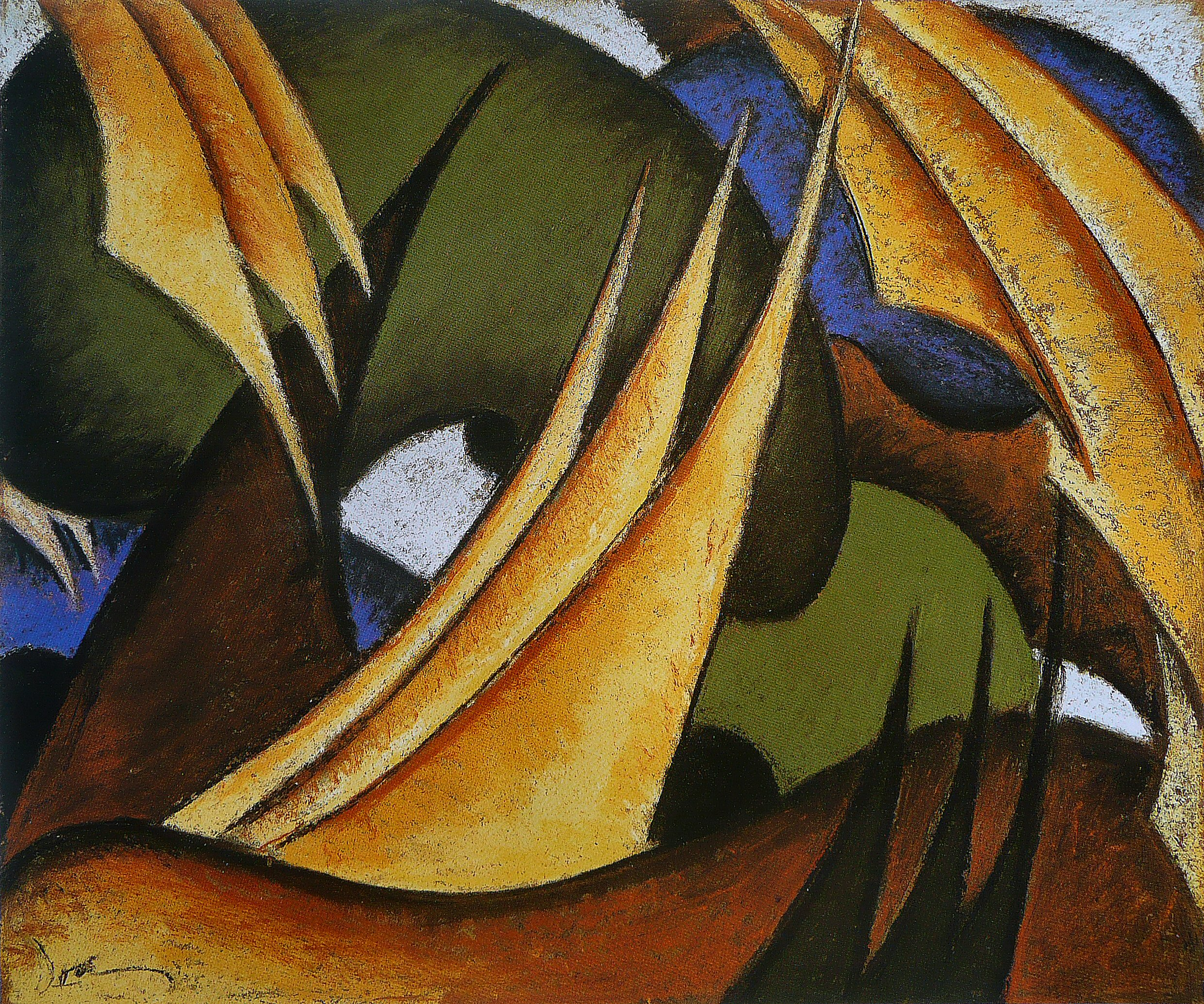
Sails, 1911–12

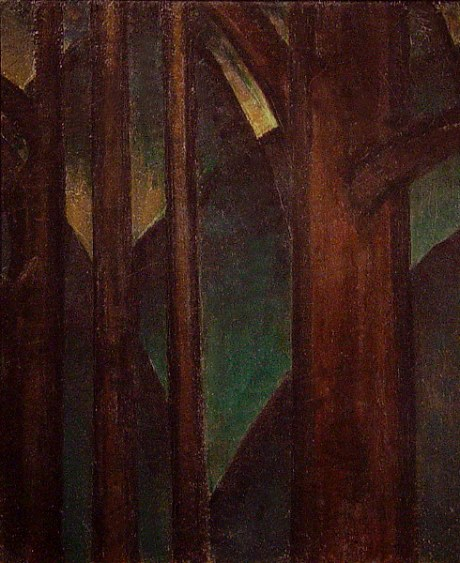
Dark Abstraction, 1917

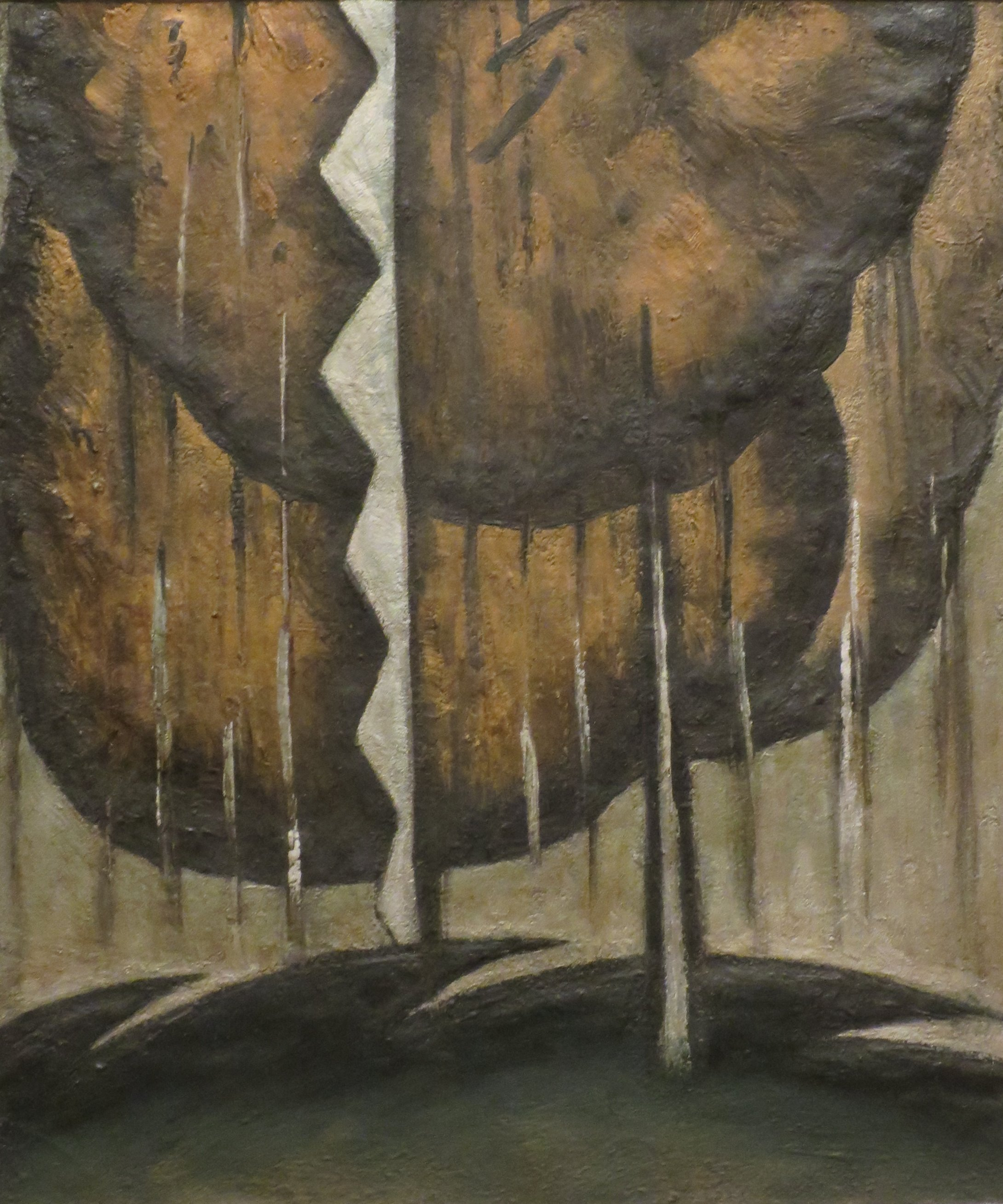
Thunderstorm, 1921

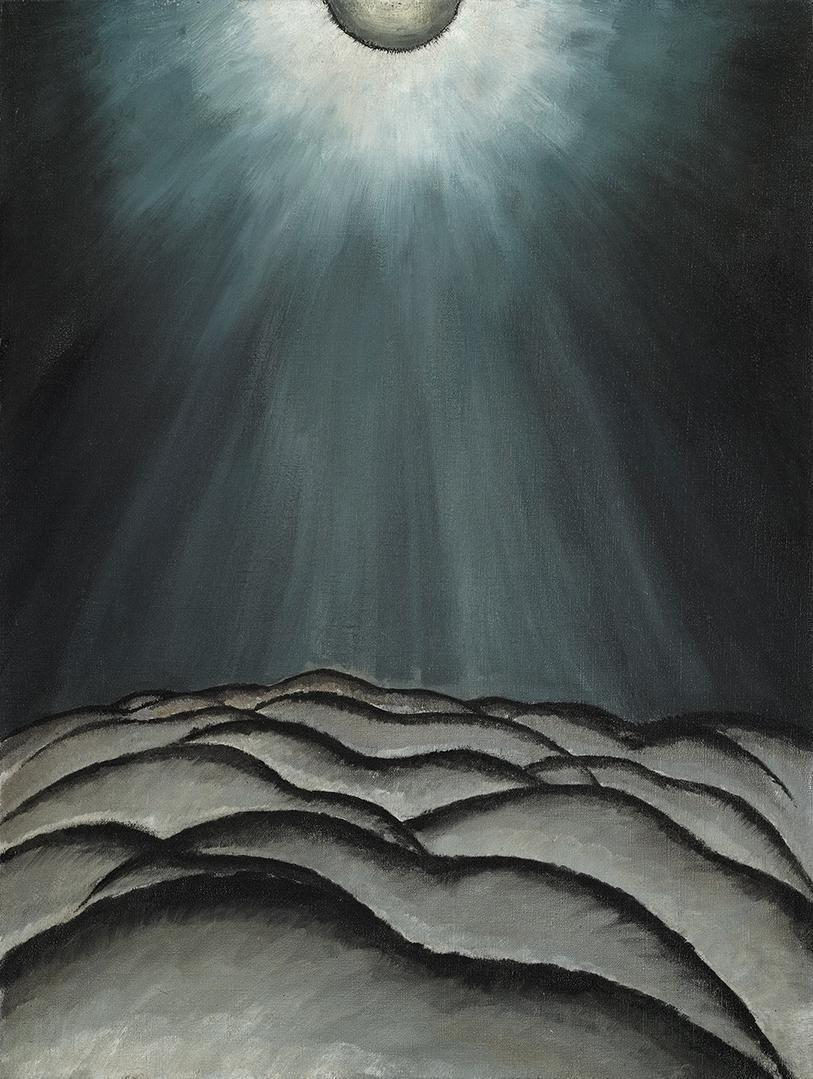
Moon and Sea No. II (1923)

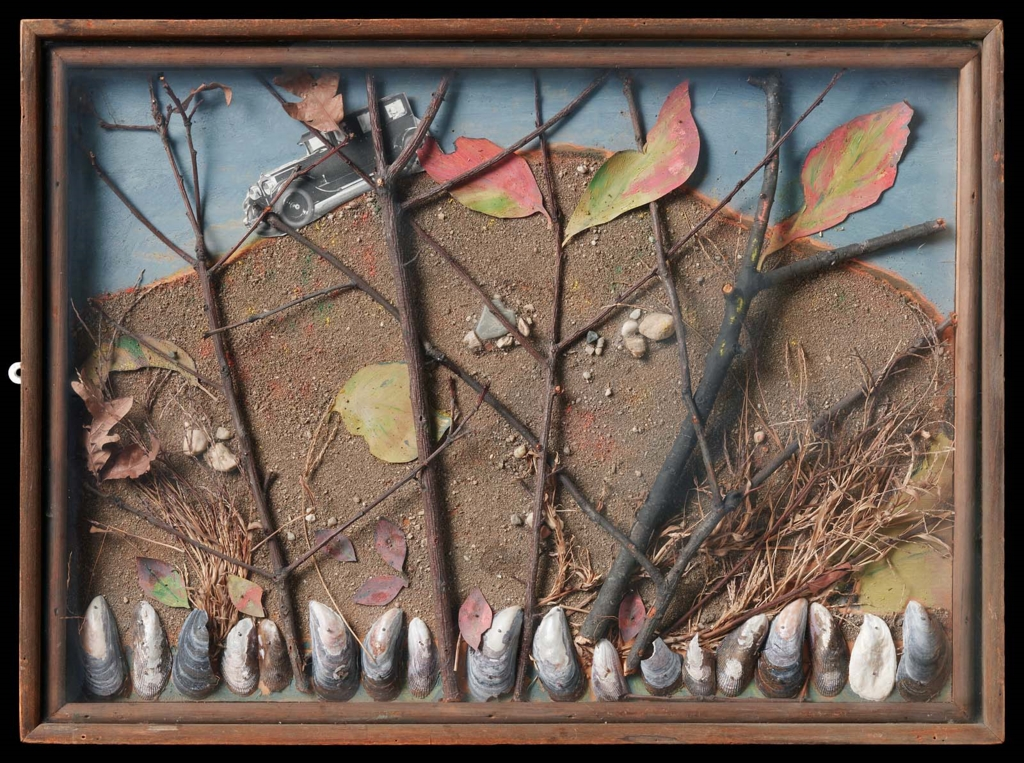
Long Island (1925)

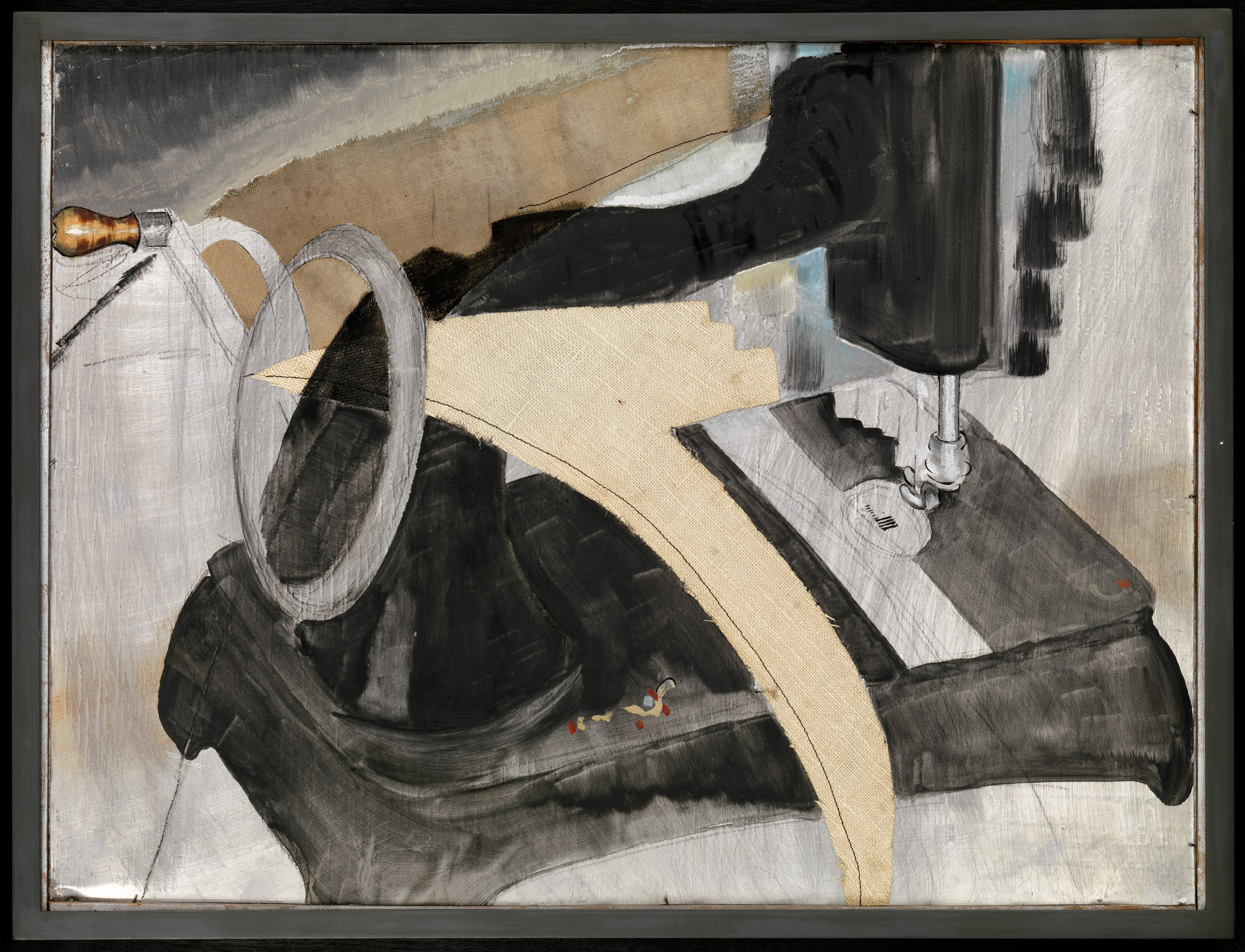
Hand Sewing Machine, (1927)

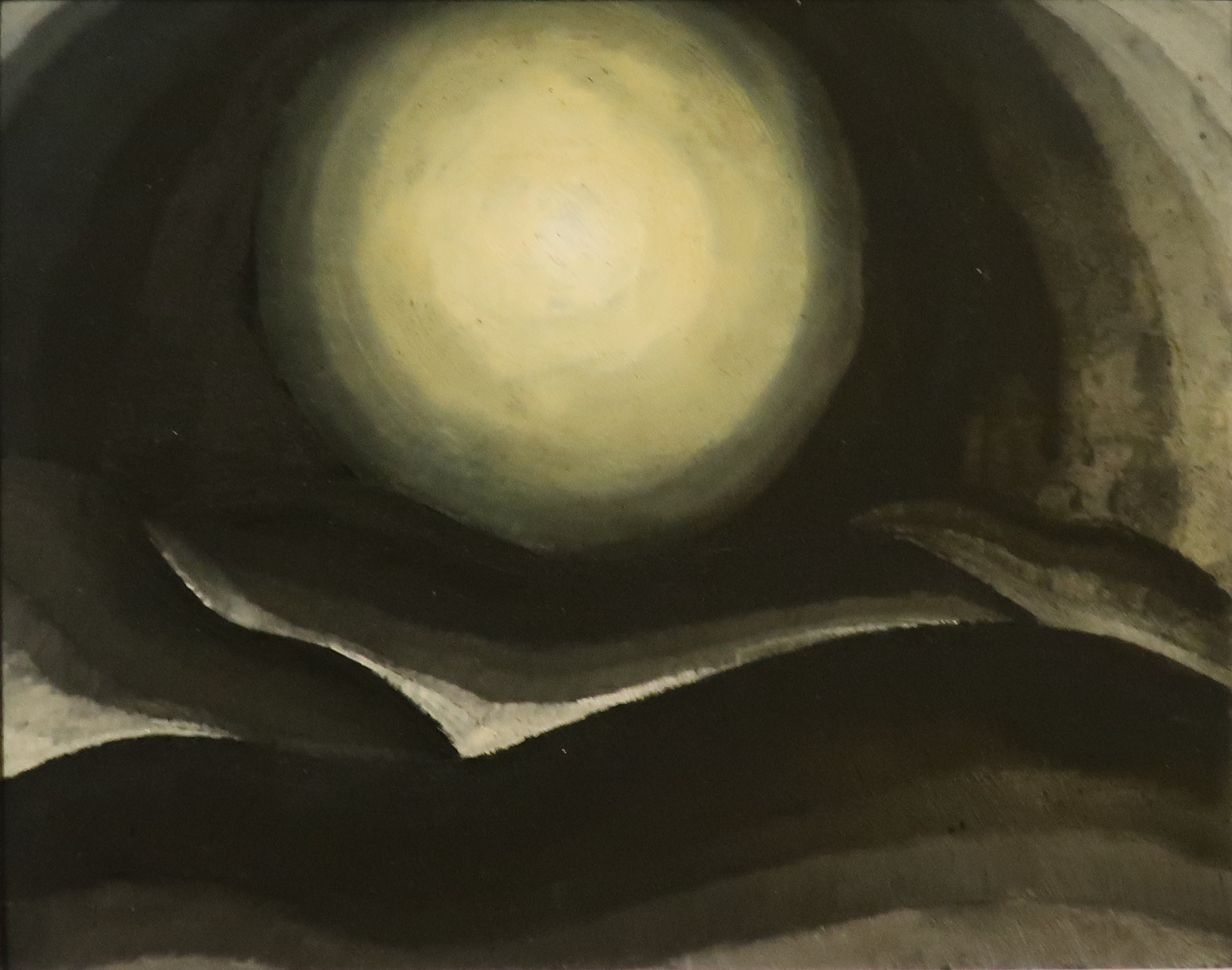
Moon, (1928)

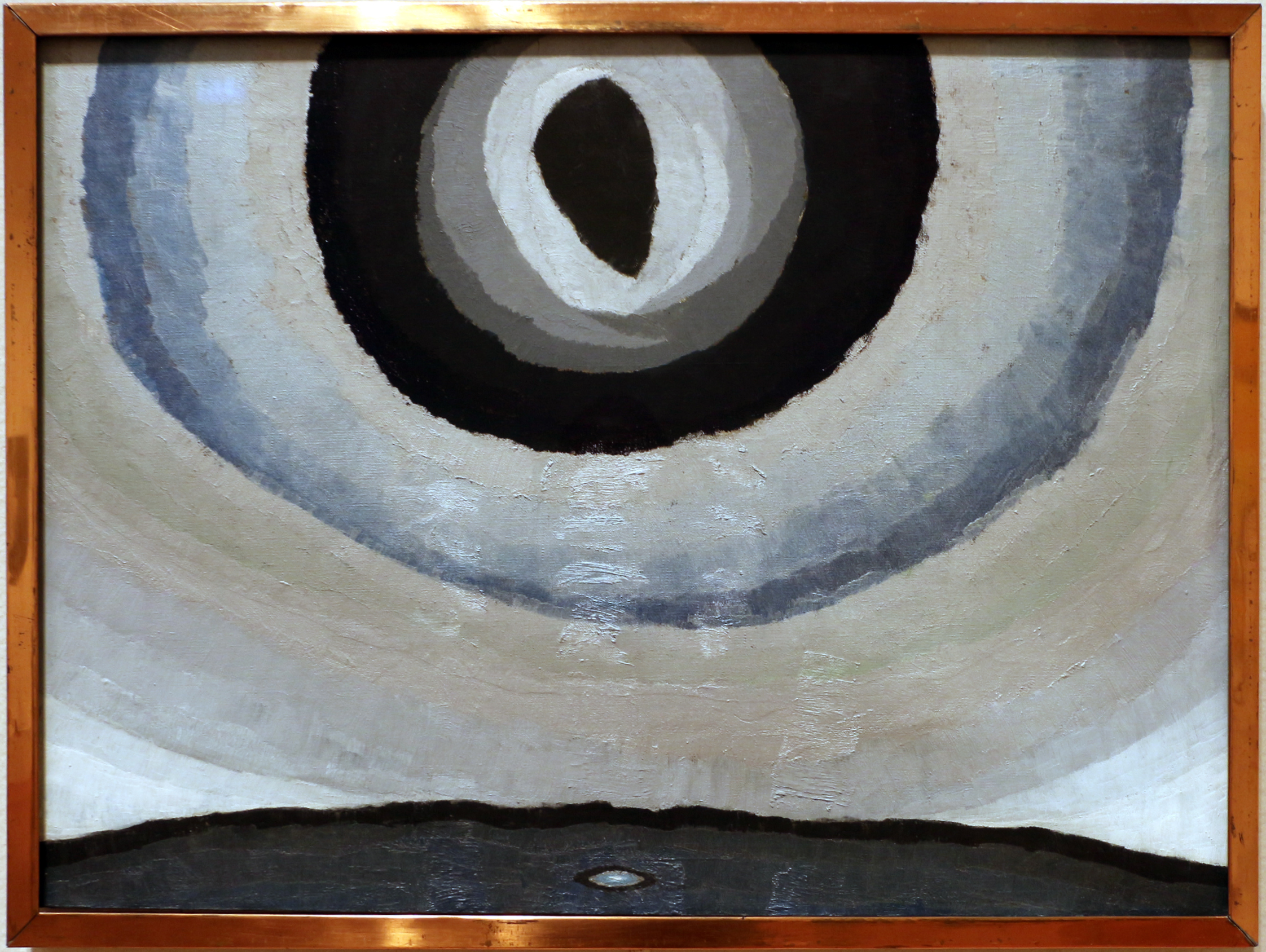
sole d'argento, (1929)

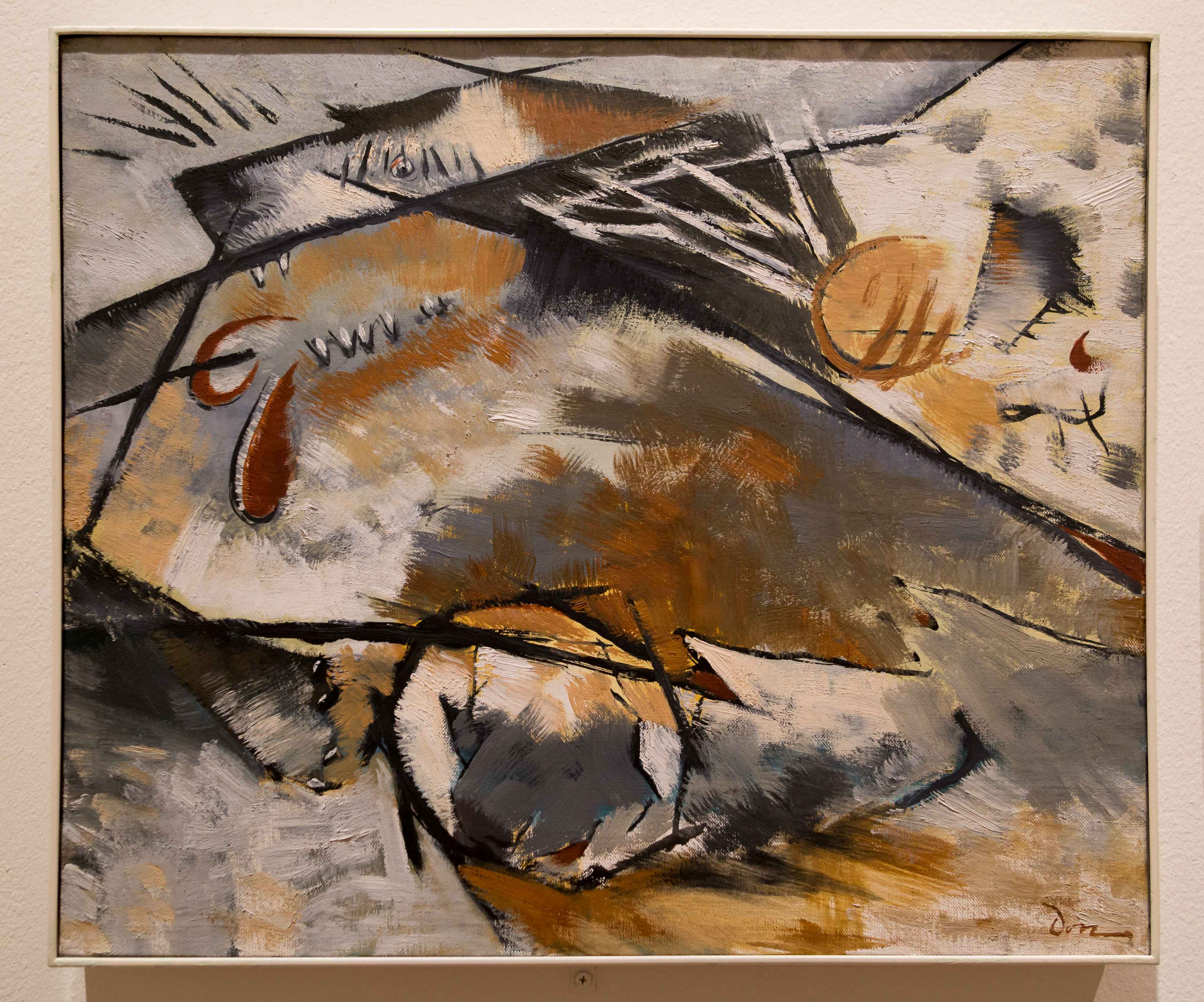
Dogs Chasing Each Other, (1929)

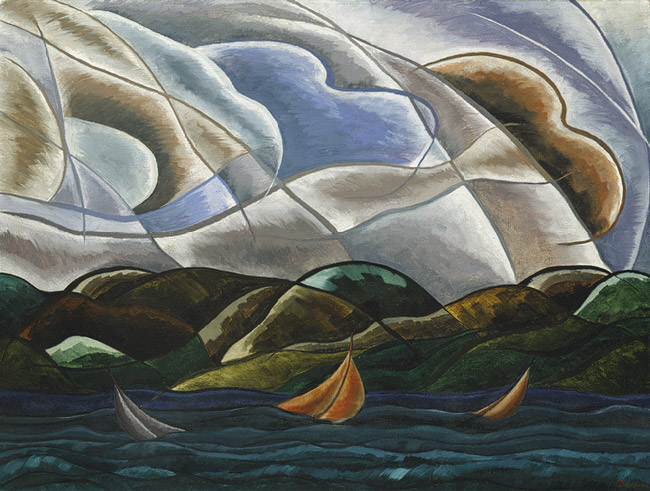
Clouds and Water, 1930, oil on canvas, 75.2 x 100.6 cm, Metropolitan Museum of Art

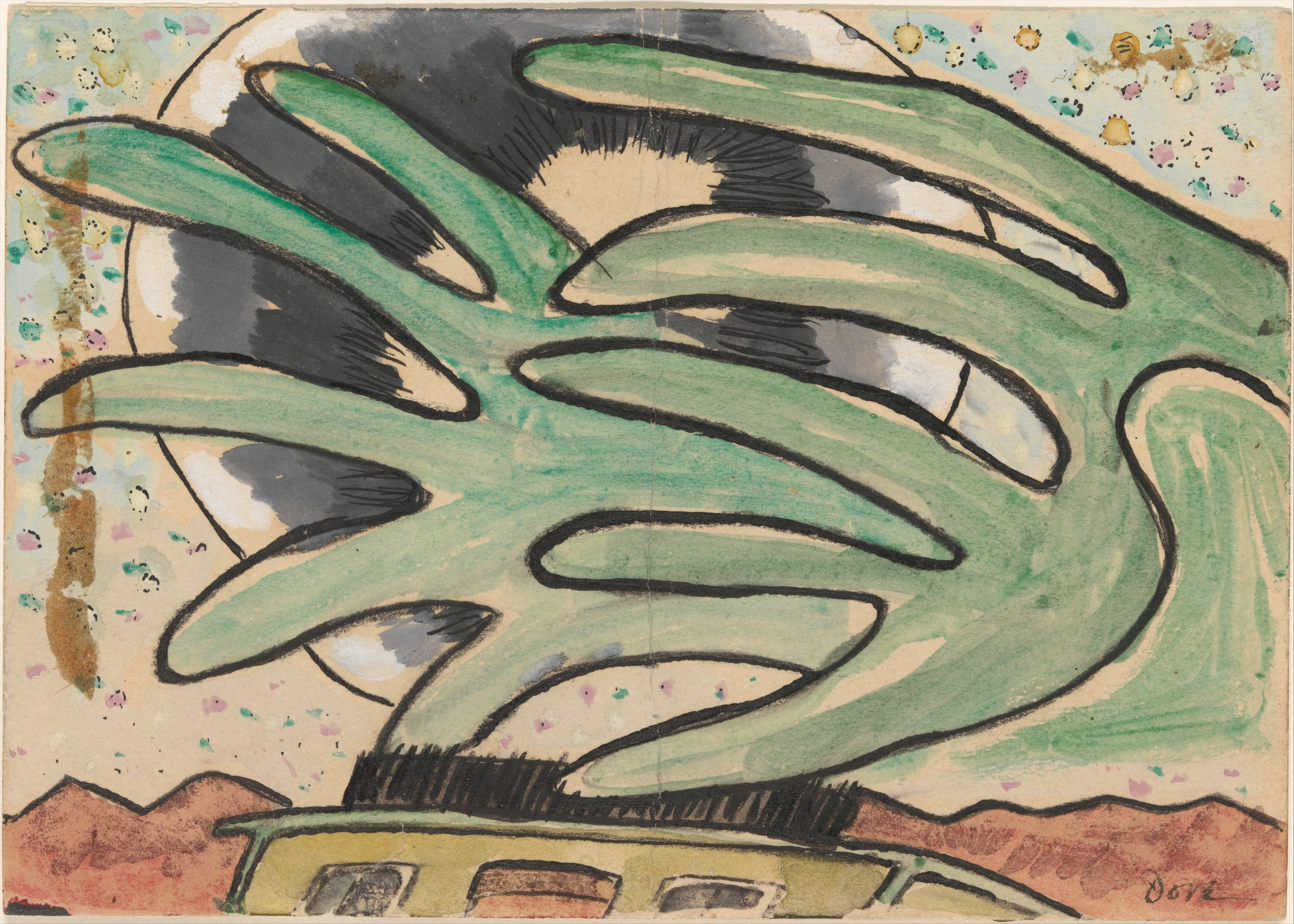
Silver Ball, Barge, and Trees, (1930)

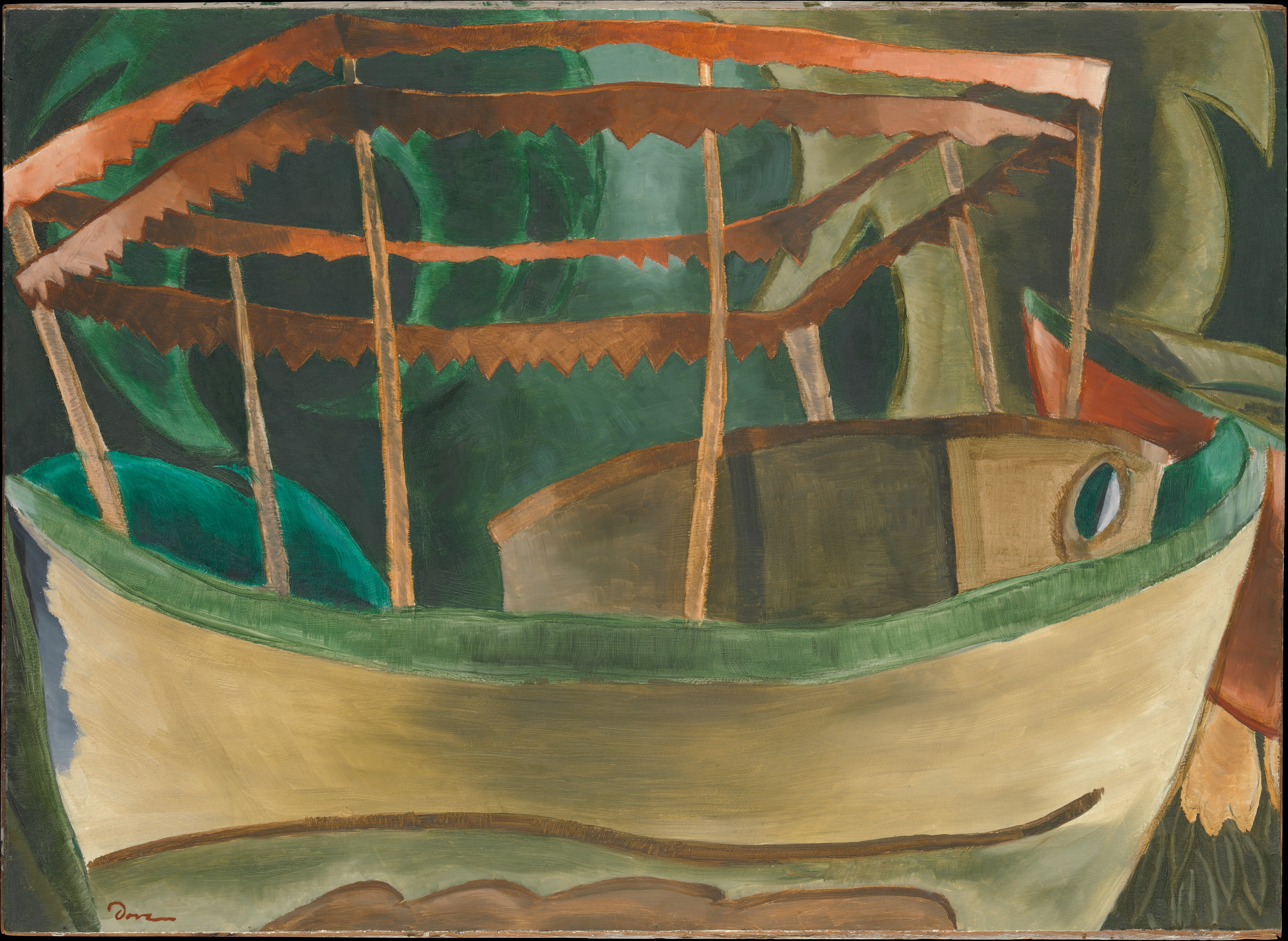
Fishing boat, (1930)

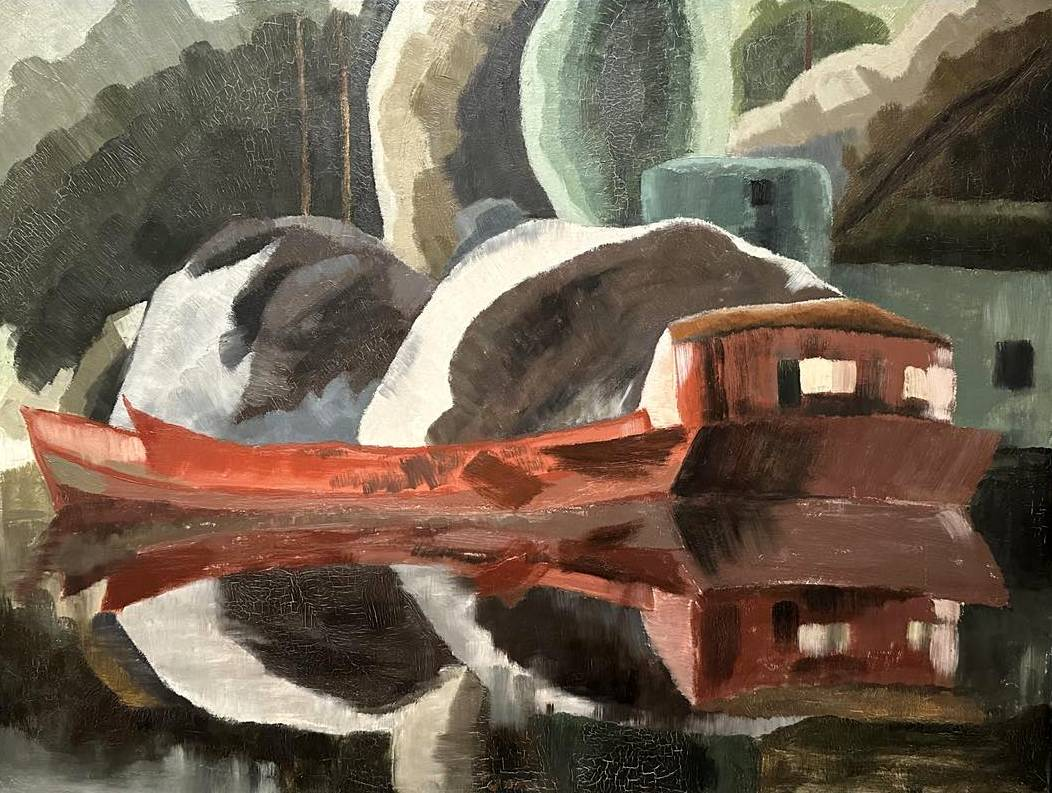
Red Barge (1931), The Phillips Collection

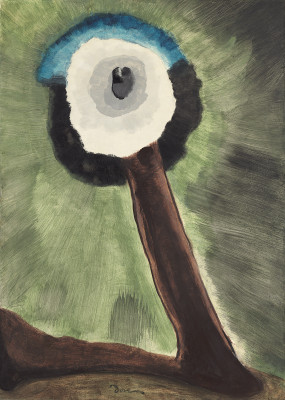
Moon, 1935, oil on canvas, 88.9 x 63.5 cm, National Gallery of Art, Washington DC

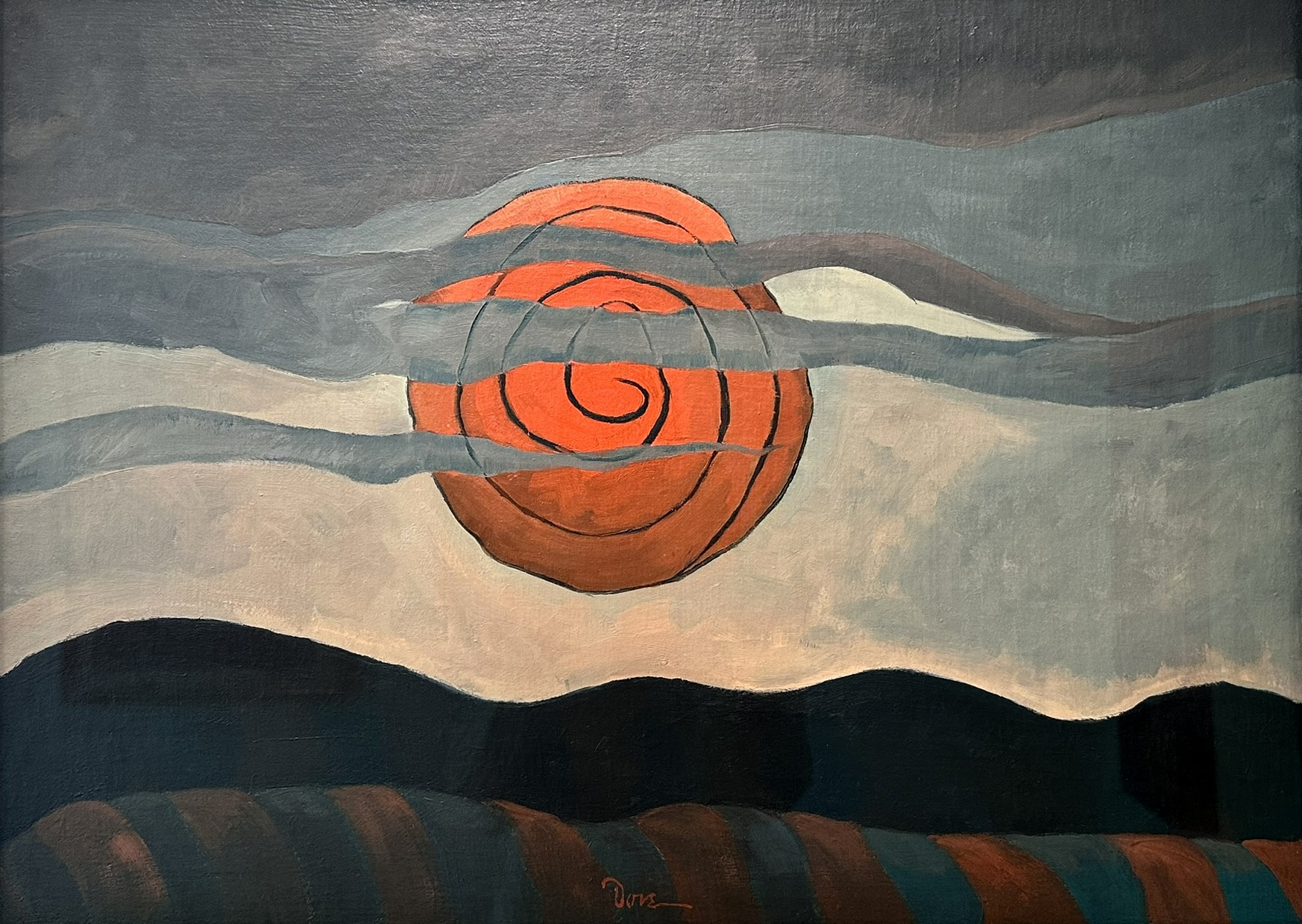
Red Sun (1935), The Phillips Collection

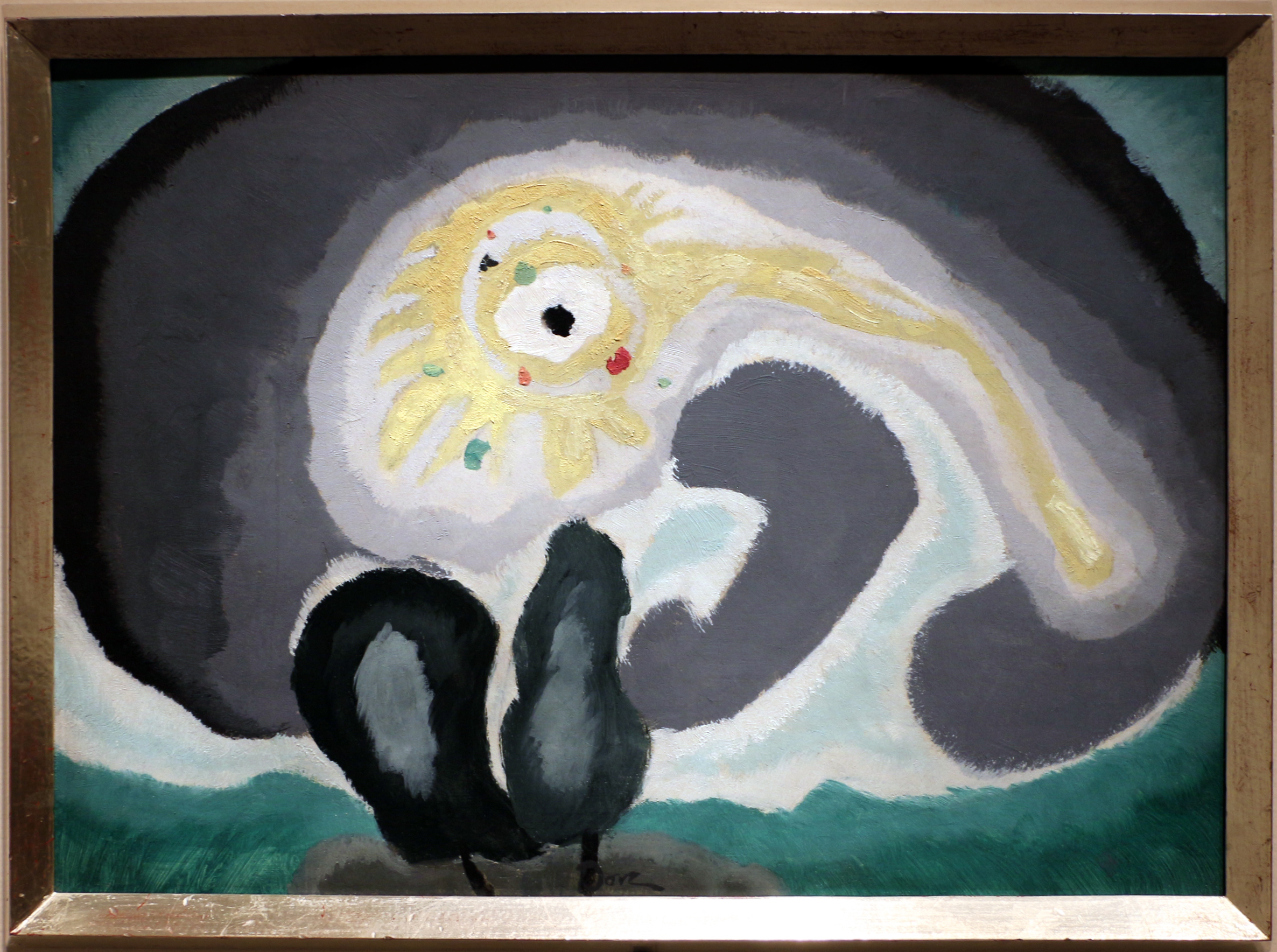
Reflections (1935)

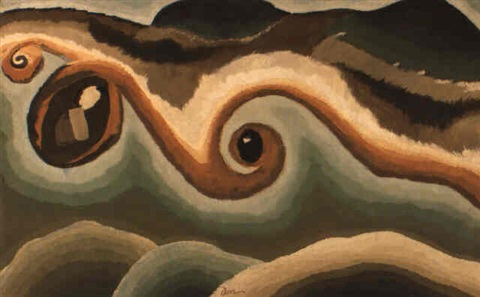
Canandaigua Outlet (1937)

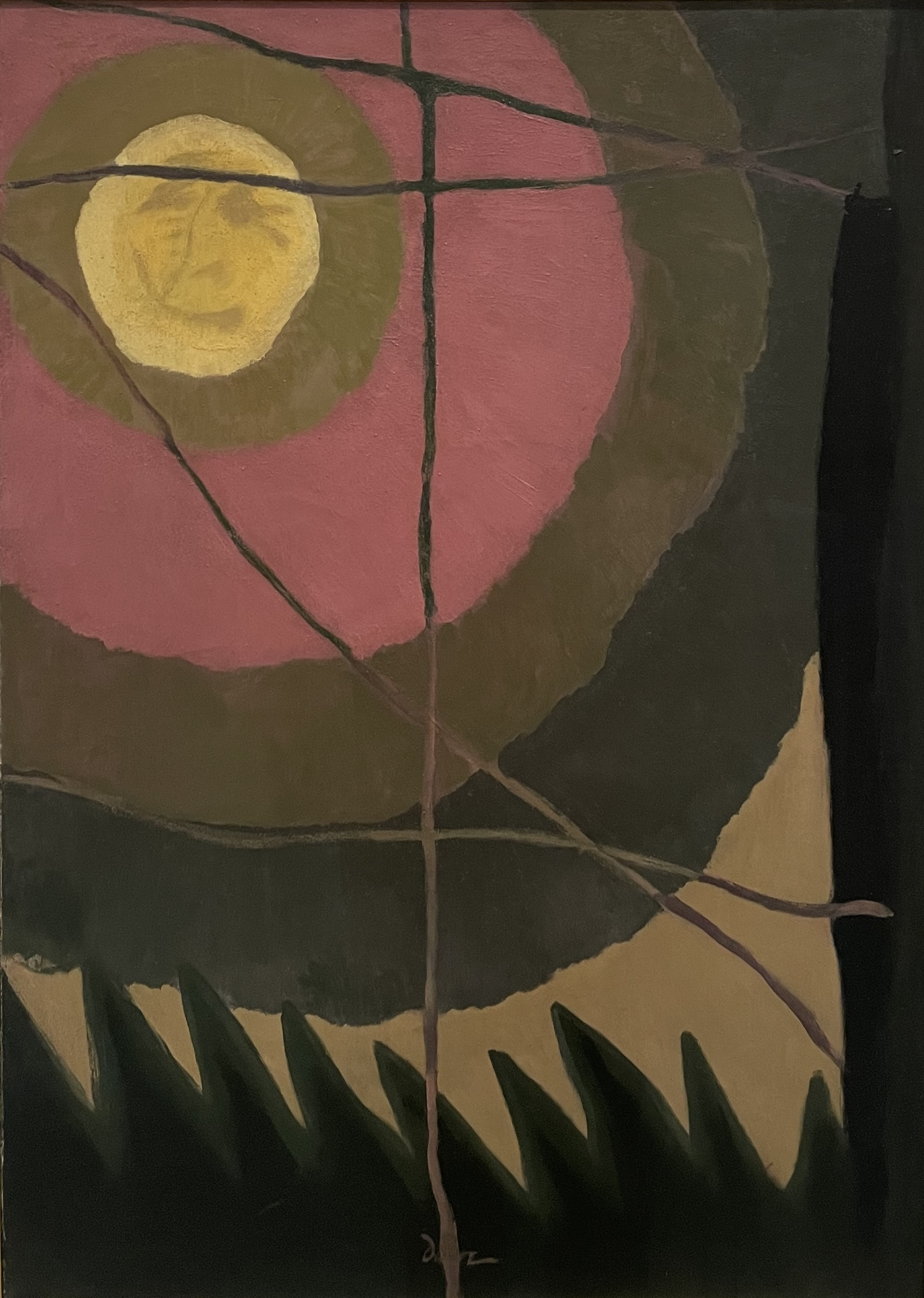
City Moon (1938), Hirshhorn Museum

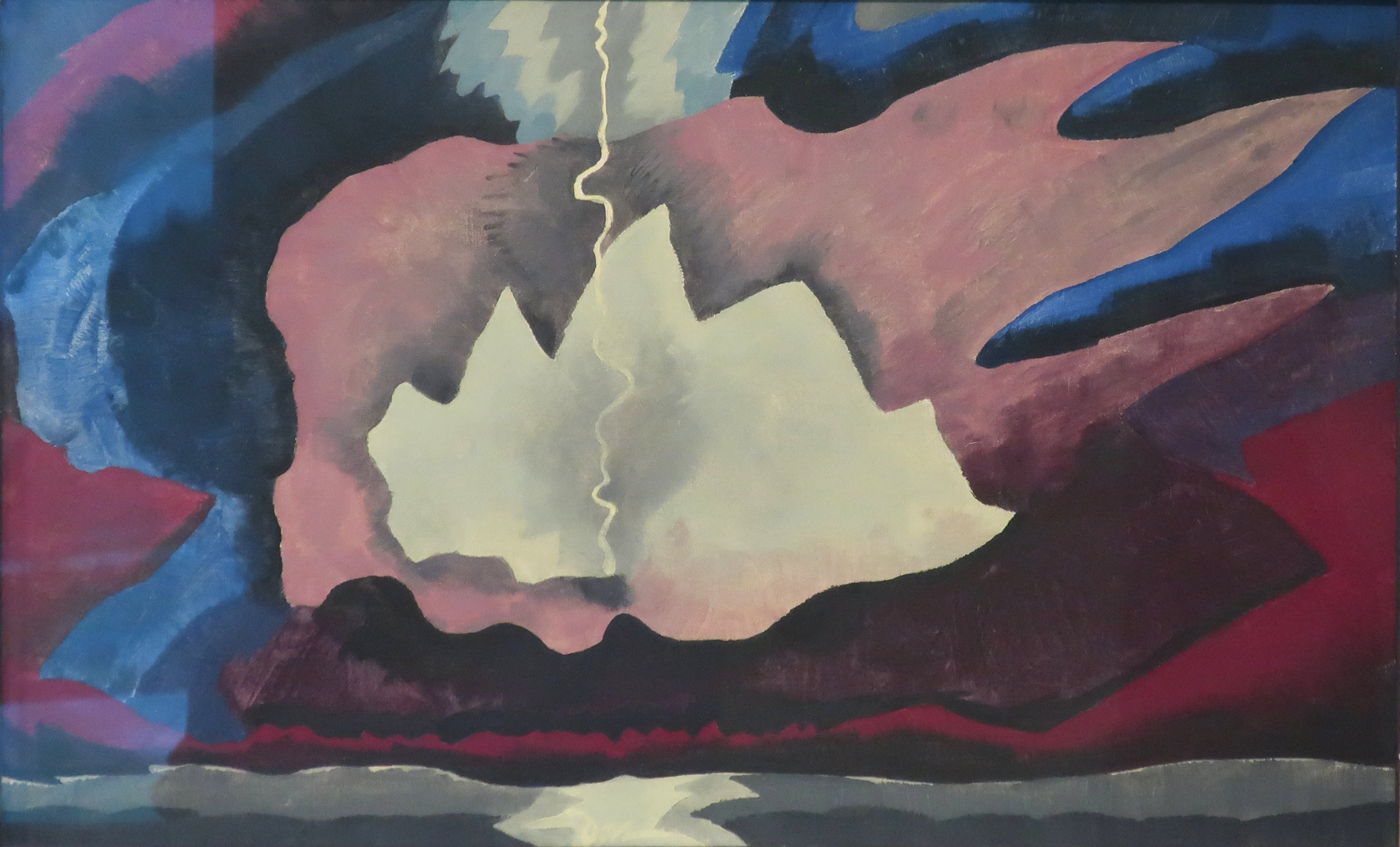
Thunder Shower (1940), Amon Carter Museum of American Art

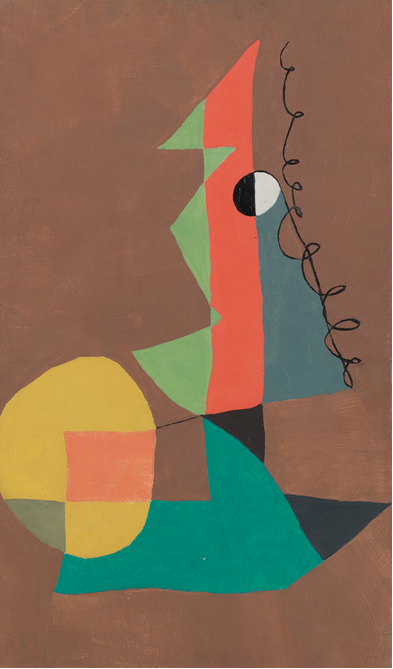
04 Percent (1942)

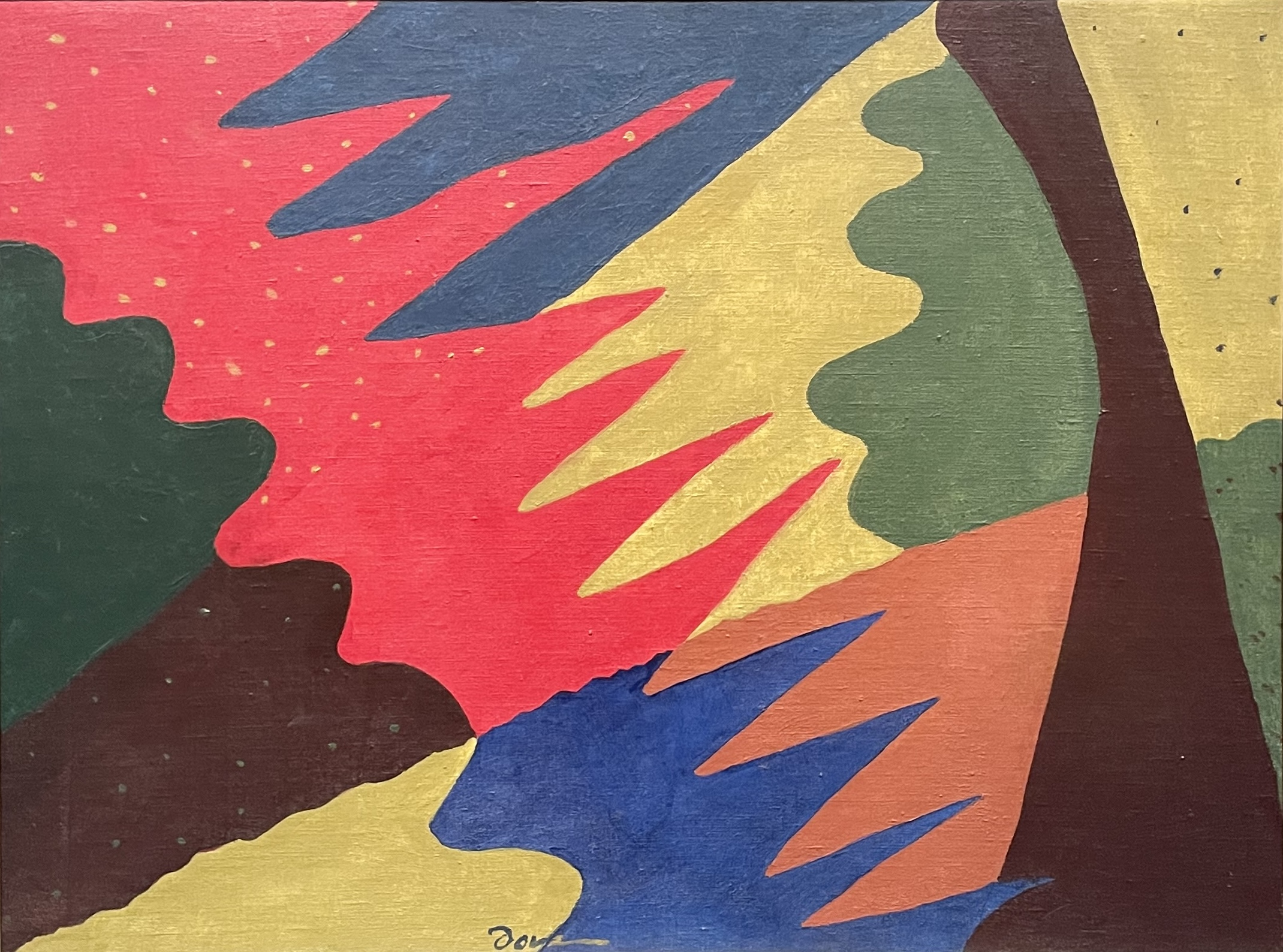
Space Divided by Line Motive (1943), National Gallery of Art

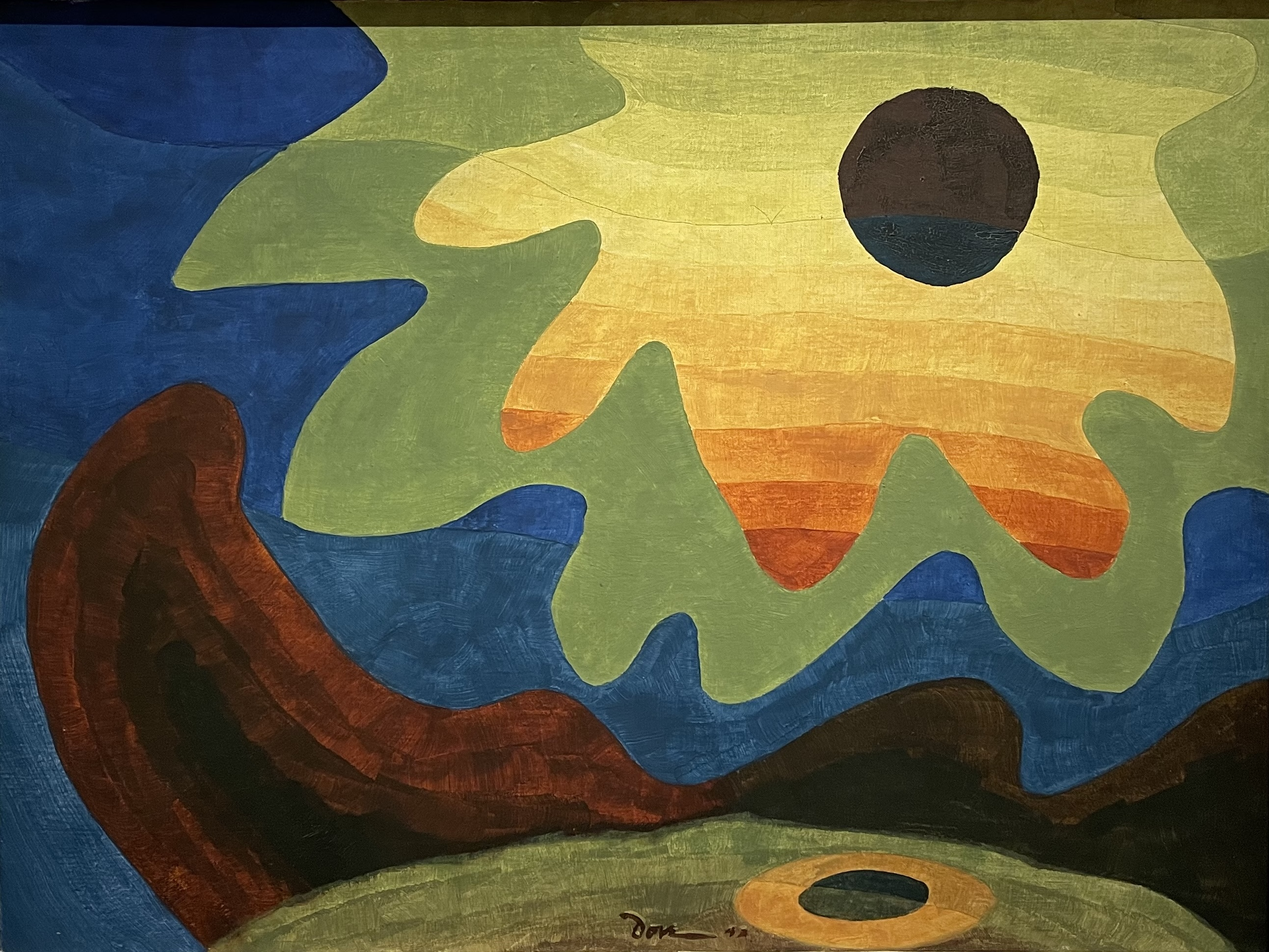
Sun (1943), Smithsonian American Art Museum

== Selected list of works ==
- 1910 Abstraction No. 1 - 6
- 1911 Movement No. 1
- 1911 Nature Symbolized
- ca. 1911 Nature Symbolized, No. 2
- 1911 - 2 Sails
- ca. 1912 Plant Forms
- ca. 1912 - 3 A Walk: Poplars
- 1913 Pagan Philosophy
- 1915 Plant Form
- 1917 - 20 Gear
- 1917 - 20 Thunderstorm
- 1920 Dark Abstraction (Woods)
- ca. 1921 Thunderstorm
- 1922 After the Storm, Silver and Green (Vault Sky) New Jersey State Museum
- 1923 Moon and Sea II
- 1923 Chinese Music
- 1924 Sunrise
- 1924 Huntington Harbor
- 1924 Starry Heavens
- 1924 Nature Symbolized or Reefs
- 1925 The Intellectual
- 1925 Goin’ Fishin’
- 1925 The Critic
- 1926 Portrait of Alfred Stieglitz
- 1927 George Gershwin, Rhapsody in Blue Part 1
- 1928 Snow and Water
- 1928 Composition
- 1928 Sea Gull Motive (also known as Sea Thunder or The Wave)
- 1929 Alfie’s Delight
- 1929 Silver Sun
- 1929 Foghorns
- 1929 Wind (number 1)
- 1929 Harbor in Light
- 1929 Moth Dance
- 1929 "Tree Trunk"
- 1930 - ? Brick Barge with Landscape
- 1931 Ice and Clouds
- 1931 Fields of Grain as Seen from Train
- 1931 Ferry Boat Wreck
- 1931 Pine Tree
- 1931 Two Forms
- 1931 Abstract from Threshing Engine
- 1931 Steam Boat - Northport
- 1932 Gale
- 1932 Dawn III
- 1932 Sunday
- ca. 1933 Sun Drawing Water
- 1934 Trees
- 1934 Trees II
- 1934 Brickyard Shed
- 1934 - ? Sowing Wheat
- 1935 Moon
- 1935 Corn Crib
- 1935 Red Sun
- 1935 " Cow #1"
- 1935 Snowstorm
- 1935 Barns
- 1935 Tree I
- 1936 Windy Morning
- 1937 Me and the Moon
- 1937 Happy Landscape
- 1937 - ? Water Swirl, Canandaigua Outlet
- 1938 "City Moon"
- 1938 Shore Front
- 1938 Tanks
- 1938 Holbrook’s Bridge to the Northwest
- 1938 Swing Music (Louis Armstrong)
- 1938 "Motor Boat" Boston MFA
- 1939 Continuity
- 1939 What Harbor Worcester Art Museum
- 1940 Abstract Still Life
- 1940 Syosset
- 1940 Black and White
- 1941 Our House
- 1941 Pyramid Formation
- 1941 The Brothers #1 Honolulu Museum of Art
- 1941 Landscape
- 1941 "Neighborly Attempt At Murder" Boston MFA
- 1942 The Brothers McNay Art Museum
- 1942 Untitled #3 New Britain Museum of American Art, Connecticut
- 1943 Space Divided by Line Motive (U.S.A.)
- 1943 Sun
- 1943 Sand and Sea
- 1936 - 44 Fire the Sauerkraut Factory, West X, New York
- 1938 "Sun On The Lake" Boston MFA
- 1942 "Square On The Pond" Boston MFA
- 1943 "Spring" Boston MFA
- 1944 "Dancing Willows" Boston MFA
- 1944 That Red One Boston MFA
- 1944 High Noon
- 1945 Figure 4

== Exhibitions ==
- 1940-1946 Untitled from Sketchbook “E” Arkansas Arts Center American
- 1941 "Across the Road" oil on canvas Des Moines Art Center American
- 1941 "Centerport Series #16" watercolor and gouac Hirshhorn Museum American
- 1941 "Indian Summer" oil on canvas Heckscher Museum of Art
- 1943 "Space Divided" by Line Motive oil on canvas Corcoran Gallery of Art American
- 1943 "Arthur Garfield Dove, Paintings 1942-43" An American Place, New York, NY
- 1947 "Dove Retrospective Exhibition: Paintings 1908-1946" Downtown Gallery, New York, NY
- 1958 "Arthur Dove Retrospective" Whitney Museum of American Art, New York, NY
- 1971 "Arthur Dove" Galerie Ann, Houston, TX
- 1975 "Arthur Dove: Mainly the Forties" Marion Koogler McNay Art Institute, San Antonio, TX
- 2016-2018 "Making Modern" Boston MFA, Boston, MA

== Books ==
- D. Newman: Arthur Dove and Duncan Phillips, Artist and Patron. George Braziller Inc., 1981, ISBN 0-8076-1019-4.
- Debra Bricker Balken Arthur Dove: A Retrospective. MIT Press, 1997 ISBN 0-262-02433-0.
- Melanie Kirschner: Arthur Dove: Watercolors and Pastels. George Braziller Inc., 1999, ISBN 0-8076-1447-5.
- Debra Bricker Balken Arthur Dove: A Catalogue Raisonne of Paintings and Things. Yale University Press, 2021, ISBN 0-3002-5165-3.

== Other sources ==
- Harnsberger, R. Scott (2002), Four Artists of the Stieglitz Circle: A Sourcebook on Arthur Dove, Marsden Hartley, John Marin, and Max Weber, Greenwood Press, ISBN 0-313-31488-8.
- Murphy, Jessica. “Arthur Dove (1880–1946).” In Heilbrunn Timeline of Art History. New York: The Metropolitan Museum of Art, 2000–. (June 2007)
- Raynor, Vivien (October 16, 1983). "Out of History's Mists Comes Arthur Dove". The New York Times.
