= Helen Torr =

American Modernist painter (1886–1967)

- Self-Portrait c.1934-1935
- Born: November 22, 1886; Roxborough, Philadelphia
- Died: September 8, 1967 (aged 80); Bayshore, Long Island
- Known for: Painter
- Movement: Modernism
- Spouse(s): Arthur Dove and Clive Weed

Helen S. "Reds" Torr (1886–1967) was an American early Modernist painter nicknamed "Reds" for her hair color. Torr worked alongside her artist husband Arthur Dove and friend Georgia O'Keeffe to develop a characteristically American style of Modernism in the 1920s.

== Early life ==
Torr was born in Roxborough, a neighborhood in Philadelphia, in 1886. In 1906, Helen Torr won a scholarship to the Pennsylvania Academy of the Fine Arts, where she studied under William Merritt Chase. She also studied at Drexel University.

== Career ==
Throughout her career, Torr tended to focus on the creation of both oil paintings and charcoal-based drawings. Torr's work was exhibited publicly only twice during her life, one of those at Alfred Stieglitz's gallery An American Place in 1933 as part of a group show. Torr was reluctant to put her works in exhibitions and found encouragement through her friendships. Most of her work was not shown during her lifetime. Torr outlived her husband Arthur Dove by 21 years but never resumed painting, and requested that all her paintings and drawings be destroyed. Instead, her sister donated much of her work to the Heckscher Museum, which exhibited a show of her work in 1972.

In 1980 the Graham Gallery in New York held a solo exhibition of her work. Some of her works are currently held in the Metropolitan Museum of Art and the Boston Museum of Fine Arts.

The cottage in which she and Dove resided was acquired in 1998 by the Heckscher Museum of Art in Huntington, New York. In 2000, it was accepted into the Historic Artists’ Homes and Studios Program administered by the National Trust for Historic Preservation.

Torr was reluctant to put her works in exhibitions and found encouragement through her friendships. Most of her work was not shown during her lifetime. Throughout her career, Torr tended to focus on the creation of both oil paintings and charcoal-based drawings.

== Personal ==
Her first marriage was to the cartoonist Clive Weed.

Torr met fellow artist Arthur Dove in Westport, Connecticut, which resulted in both artists leaving their first marriages. Around 1924, the couple settled aboard a sailboat anchored in Halesite on Long Island. In 1933, they moved to Dove's hometown, Geneva, New York, where they lived until 1938 when they moved to a cottage in Centerport on Long Island. They lived in the cottage until Dove's death in 1946. Throughout their life the couple suffered from economic hardship and lived in extreme poverty. Torr died in Bayshore, Long Island, New York, in 1967.

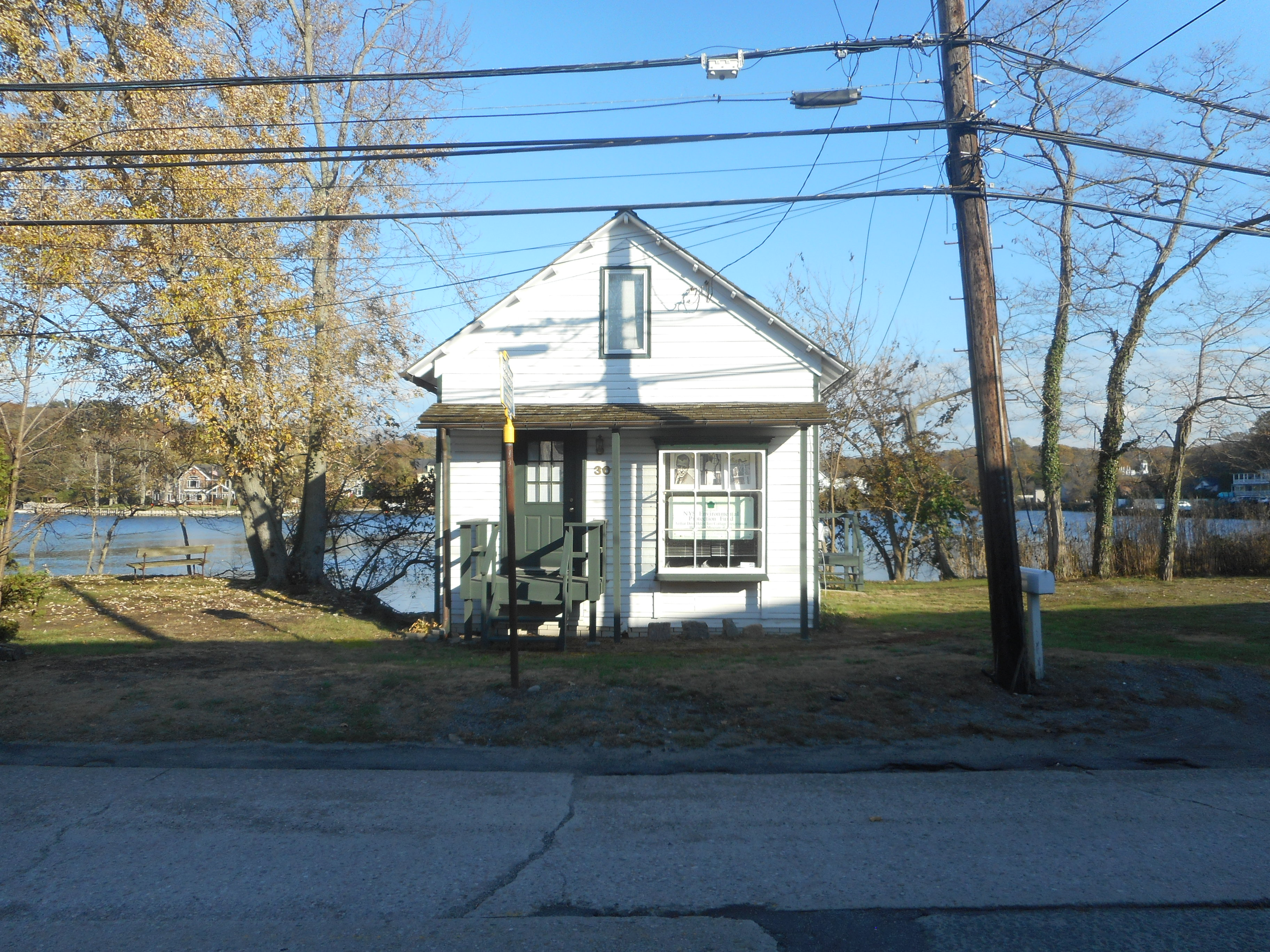
Arthur Dove-Helen Torr Cottage

== List of works ==
Image	Title of Work	Information
	Ship's Mast	Medium: Charcoal on wove paper Dimensions: 510 x 484 mm (20 1/16 x 19 1/16 in.); Creation date: 1920-35
	Evening Sounds	Medium: Oil on composition board Dimensions: 36.19 x 25.4 cm (14 1/4 x 10 in.); Creation date: 1925-30
	Crimson and Green Leaves	Medium: Oil on plywood Dimensions: 14 1/8 x 12 1/2 in. (35.9 x 31.8 cm); Creation date: 1927
	Purple and Green Leaves	Medium: Oil on copper mounted on board Dimensions: 20 1/4 x 15 1/4 in. (51.4 x 38.7 cm); Creation date: 1927
	Houses on A Barge	Medium: Oil on canvas Dimensions: 16 x 21 in. (40.6 x 53.3 cm); Creation date: 1929

== Exhibitions ==
There are many public collections in the Heckscher Museum of Art, Huntington Long Island, New York; New Jersey State Museum, Trenton, New Jersey; Terra Museum of American Art, Chicago, Illinois; San Francisco Museum of Modern Art, San Francisco, California; and the Sheldon Museum of Art, Lincoln Nebraska.

- Huntington, New York. "Helen Torr: 1886-1967," June 3, 1972–July 9, 1972.
- New York. Graham Gallery. "Helen Torr," January 30, 1972–February 21, 1998.
- New York. Graham Gallery. "Helen Torr, 1886–1967. In Private Life, Mrs. Arthur Dove," March 25–May 17, 1980, no. 7 (lent by the Estate of Helen Torr).
- New York. The Metropolitan Museum of Art. "American Still Life: 1915–1950," February 1, 1995–January 28, 1996, no catalogue.
- New York. The Metropolitan Museum of Art. "Arthur Dove/Helen Torr: Land and Water," February 14–June 14, 1998, no catalogue.
- Albany. New York State Museum. "Twentieth-Century American Landscapes from The Metropolitan Museum of Art," May 29–November 4, 2001, no catalogue.
- Oxford, England. Ashmolean Museum. "America's Cool Modernism: O'Keeffe to Hopper," March 23–July 22, 2018, no. 84.
