= The Reflector =

The Reflector may refer to:

- The Daily Reflector, a daily newspaper in Greenville, North Carolina
- The Reflector (Indiana newspaper), the student newspaper at the University of Indianapolis
- The Reflector (Mississippi newspaper), the student newspaper at Mississippi State University
- The Reflector (Virginia newspaper), a defunct newspaper in Virginia
- The Reflector (Washington newspaper), a weekly newspaper in Battle Ground, Washington

== See also ==
- The Daily Reflector, an eastern North Carolina–based newspaper
- Reflector (disambiguation)
