= Julian Hatton =

American artist

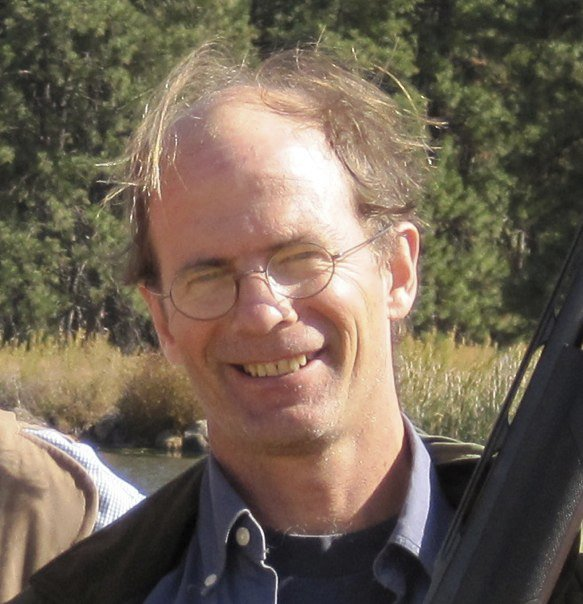
- Julian Hatton
- Born: Julian Hatton; December 19, 1956 (age 69); Grand Haven, Michigan, United States
- Education: NY Studio School of Drawing, Painting & Sculpture; 1980–1982
- Known for: Painting
- Notable work: "Tamaracks in December"
- Movement: Fauvism; Abstract Expressionism; American modernism
- Awards: MacDowell Residency Fellowship (1992); NEA (1993); N.Y.F.A. (1998); Fellowship in Painting; Pollock-Krasner Foundation(2001); American Academy of Arts and Letters (2007); Academy Awards in Art
- Patrons: Steve Wynn
- Website: www.julianhatton.net

Julian Burroughs Hatton III is an American landscape abstract artist from New York City. He studied at New York Studio School of Drawing, Painting and Sculpture and has exhibited at galleries across the United States.

== Early years ==
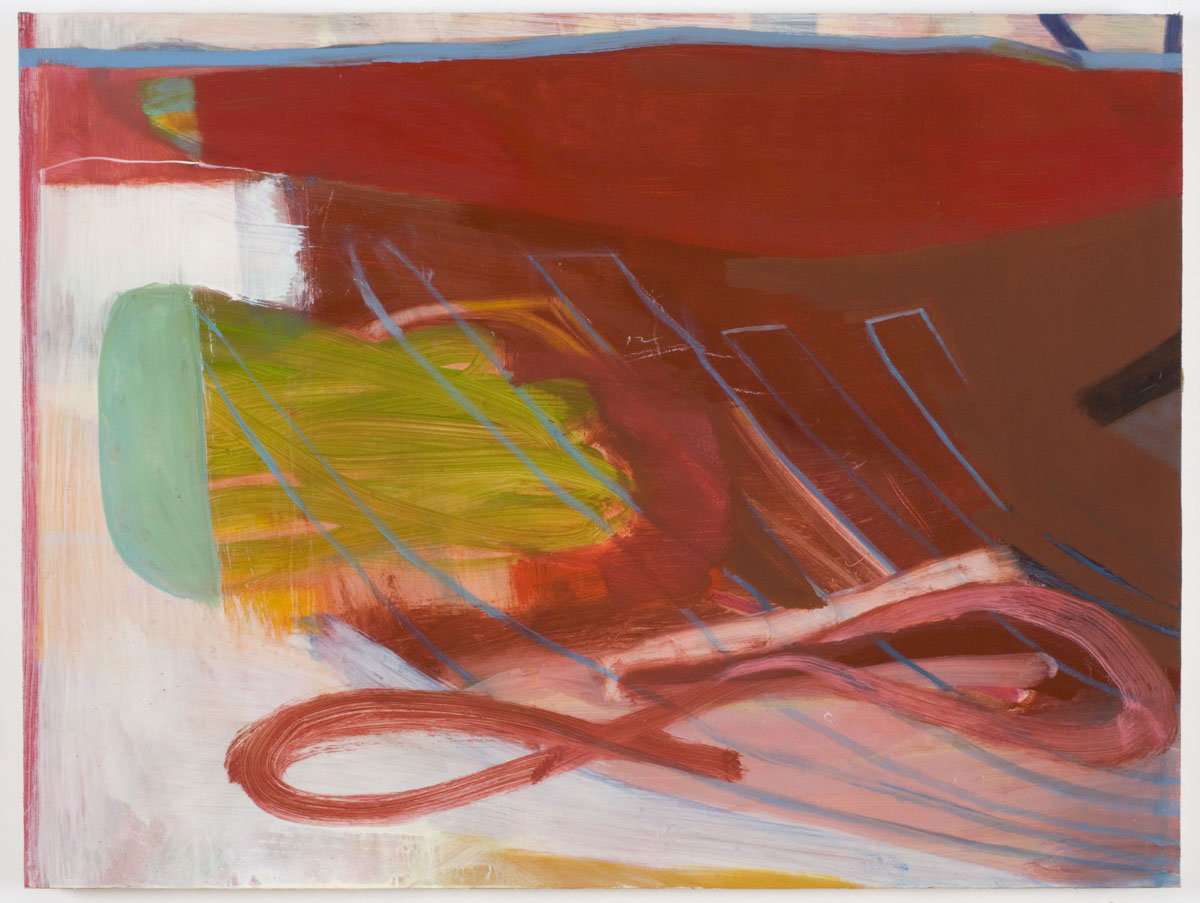
Slow Curve by Julian Hatton.

Hatton was born in Grand Haven, Michigan. The cold Michigan climate and cold flat landscape influenced his sense of color. He graduated from Phillips Academy in Andover, Massachusetts in 1974. Hatton then graduated from Harvard University in 1979 with a major in art history. Painting in the North of France helped him develop his understanding of color and landscape. His first application to the Studio School in New York was rejected since he lacked a portfolio. He studied with painter Fernando Zobel in Spain, returned with a portfolio, and was accepted. He enrolled at the New York Studio School of Drawing, Painting and Sculpture from 1980 to 1982.

Hatton worked at the Water Club restaurant in Manhattan for eight years. Later, he worked with decorative painters, painting interiors of apartments and restaurants, while living in SoHo.

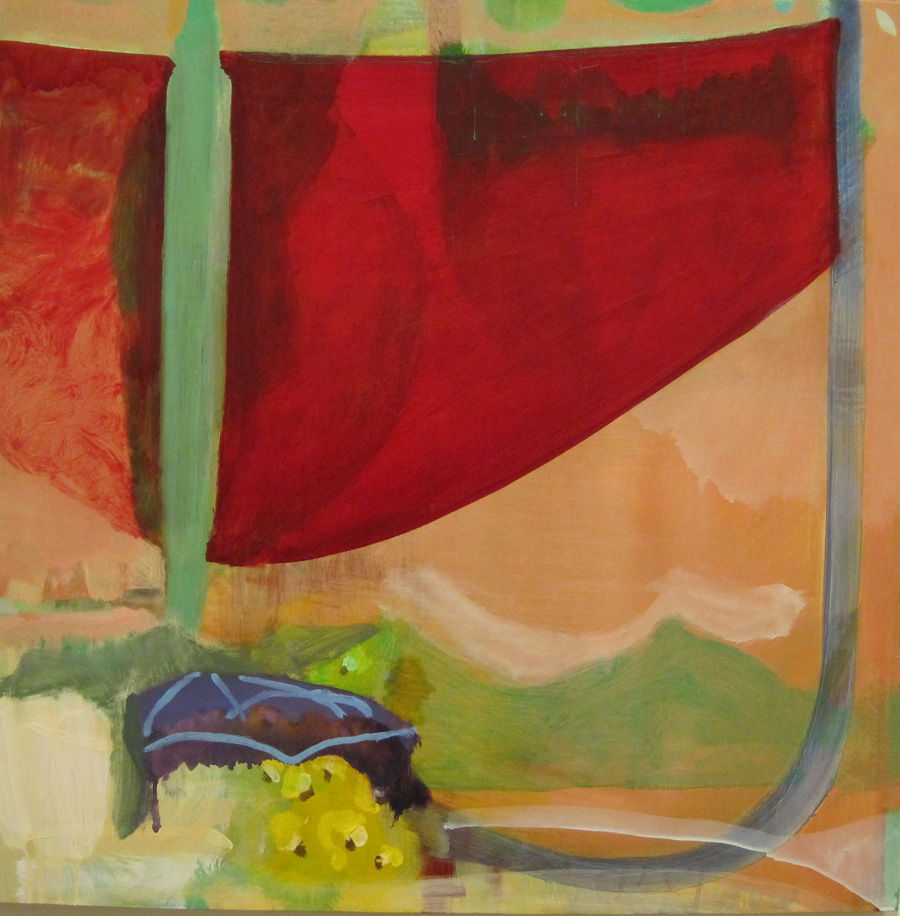
Close to the Wizard of Oz by Julian Hatton.

== Career ==
Hatton exhibited at Manhattan galleries, including Elizabeth Harris Gallery, Kathryn Markel Gallery, Frederieke Taylor Gallery, Frank Mario Gallery, Jon Leon Gallery, Eighth Floor Gallery, Lohin Geduld Gallery and the American Academy of Arts and Letters Invitational Exhibit. He has exhibited his artwork in Washington, Atlanta, San Francisco, Dallas, Charlotte, La Jolla, and Southwest Harbor and Belfast in Maine. His work was shown internationally at the Museum at Rochefort-en-Terre in Brittany, France.

ArtInfo described his paintings as "boldly integrating invented and observed shapes and colors" with his "own lexicon of shapes and lines which he arranges in innovative ways" using a "homemade visual syntax", yielding a "feast of contradictions." During these years he taught at the Rhode Island School of Design as well as Swarthmore College and the Vermont Studio Center.

== Reception ==
New York Times critics have described his painting style as "vibrant, playful, semi-abstract landscapes" and "layers broad, richly colored shapes of trees, rivers and hills into funky, tautly frontal arcadian visions." Paintings had a "mix of Fauvism, Abstract Expressionism and outsider vision."

Art critic John Goodrich of the New York Sun felt Hatton's paintings were less "real" in terms of factual description but that they "contain their own peculiar truths, evident in keenly felt colors and designs." Goodrich felt Hatton "finds expression through his forms."

Critic Ann Landi of ARTnews wrote there was "something endearingly anachronistic about Julian Hatton's abstractions" and compared Hatton to Arthur Dove and Georgia O'Keeffe.

Ebony wrote in 2005 in Art in America that Hatton "experiments with complex and sometimes contradictory spatial relationships" and that his landscapes "consist of Cubist-inspired fractured planes and shifting, multiple perspectives." Critic Joel Silverstein in Reviewny.com suggested Hatton's paintings "sing to each other in a high key citron-like color" and compared him to Paul Gauguin, Miró and Hofmann. He described Hatton as a "lyrical designer" who "abstracts form by promoting visual attractiveness."

In The Brooklyn Rail critic Hovey Brock described Hatton's paintings as having a "healthy self-confidence not only in his artistic process, but also in the very enterprise of abstract painting." Critic Peter Malone of Hyperallergic magazine described Hatton's 2019 show entitled Bewilderness as "vigorously overlapping perspectives are pulled into a unified whole made of delightfully unstable parts" that demonstrate a "copious gift for invention, expressed through witty references to flowers, trees, rivers, pathways, and other landscape elements."

== Grants and awards ==
- 1992–MacDowell Residency Fellowship
- 1993–National Endowment for the Arts, Washington, D.C.
- 1995–Rochefort-en-Terre, Art Colony Fellowship, Brittany, France
- 1998–New York Foundation for the Arts Fellowship in Painting
- 2007–Award in Art, American Academy of Arts and Letters
