= Toni Dove =

American sculptor; interactive film, installation and performance art

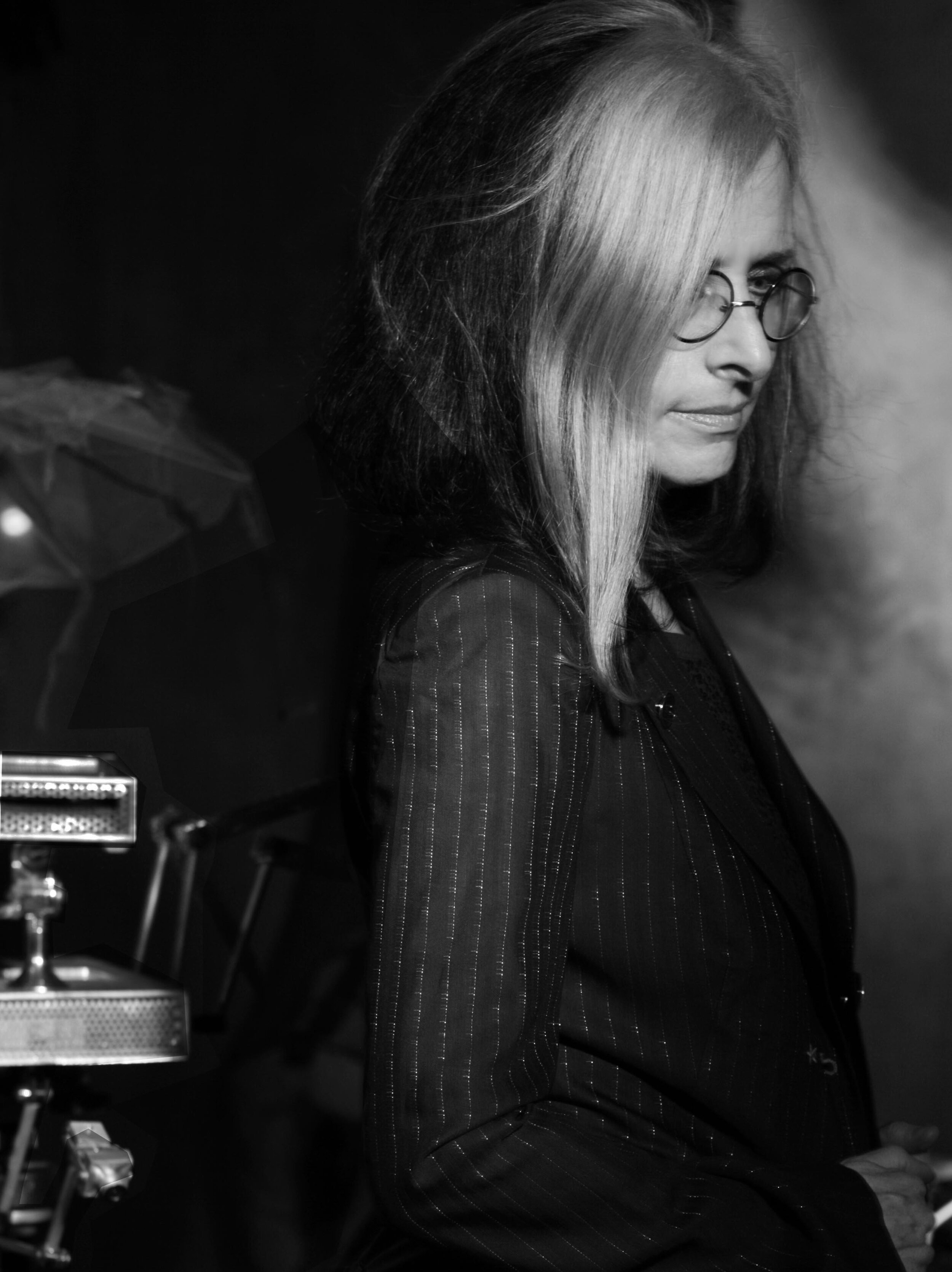
- Born: Toni Dove; 1946 (age 79–80)
- Known for: Performance, installation-video

Toni Dove is an American artist based in New York. Since the early 1990s, she has produced unique and highly imaginative embodied hybrids of film, installation and performance. In her work, performers and participants interact with an unfolding narrative, using interface technologies such as motion sensing to “perform” on-screen avatars.

== Career ==
Dove is considered one of the pioneers of Interactive Cinema and has shown work at ZKM, the Banff Centre for the Arts, the Brooklyn Anchorage, and the Whitney Museum of American Art. She has been affiliated with Creative Time and Harvestworks, and a DVD version of scenes from her pieces has been distributed by Cycling '74. She is the granddaughter of American abstract painter Arthur Dove.

Dove has been working with interactive narrative since 1990. Her work blends cinematic tropes typical of studio-age film noir with contemporary narrative trends in science fiction, cybernetics, and new media, often offering a feminist take on popular genres. Dove refers to her work as "cyber-theatre" because it relies on virtual performers (avatars) rather than human actors and because she gives her audience partial control over the performance through the use of interactive technologies. In these hybrids of film, installation art, and experimental theater, the participants interact with an unfolding narrative movie, often using minimally invasive interface technologies such as speech recognition and computer vision to control or 'perform' their on-screen avatars.

Dove's 1994 piece entitled Casual Workers, Hallucinations and Appropriate Ghosts has been interpreted as belonging to the larger domain of radio because of its "aural evocation of high-tech street erotics". The piece tracks a metamorphosis from a choreography based on the gestures of Charcot's "theater" of hysteria to a choreography of the female heroines of martial arts. It is accompanied by a narrative about disturbances in the fabric of human intimacy followed by a three minute symphony constructed entirely of screams. The piece was situated at the end of a series of adult video stores and presented an alternative view of the subject matter at hand on 42nd street.

In 2001 Toni Dove received funding from the Daniel Langlois Foundation to produce Spectropia: A Ghost Story on the Infinite Deferral of Desire, the second part in a "trilogy of narrative, interactive installations begun in 1998". The first installment, Artificial Changelings, dealt with "the emergence of compulsive consumerism in the 19th century" through a plotline centered on a heist. For this piece, Dove used floor mats as the basis for viewer interaction with the piece: moving around shifted the visitor's point of view among three options (first, second, and third person). Gestures made by visitors further affected how the piece was experienced. In the second installment, Dove continued her inquiry "into the subconscious at work in the capitalist society of the early 20th century".

== Notable works ==
- Lucid Possession (2009–present)
- Spectropia (2001–2010)
- Artificial Changelings (1995–2000)
- Casual Workers, Hallucinations and Appropriate Ghosts (1994)
- Archeology of a Mother Tongue (1993; in collaboration with Michael Mackenzie)
- The Blessed Abyss: A Tale of Unmanageable Ecstasies (1992)
- Mesmer: Secrets of the Human Frame (1990)

== Publications ==
- "Haunting the Movie: Embodied Interface/Sensory Cinema." In Gavin Carver and Colin Beardon, New Visions in Performance: The Impact of Digital Technologies. Routledge, 2012.
- "The Space Between: Telepresence, Re-Animation and the Re-Casting of the Invisible." In Martin Rieser and Andrea Zapp, New Screen Media: Cinema/Art/Narrative. London: British Film Institute, 2002, pp. 208–220.
- "Theater Without Actors: Immersion and Response in Installation." In Leonardo (1994): 281-287.
- Mesmer: Secrets of the Human Frame. Granary Books, 1990.
