= Reflexive =

Reflexive, or the property reflexivity, may refer to:

== Grammar ==
- Reflexivity (grammar):
  - Reflexive pronoun, a pronoun with a reflexive relationship with its self-identical antecedent
  - Reflexive verb, where a semantic agent and patient are the same

== Mathematics and computer science ==
- Reflexive relation, a relation where elements of a set are self-related
- Reflexive operator algebra, an operator algebra that has enough invariant subspaces to characterize it
- Reflexive space, a subset of Banach spaces
- Reflexive bilinear form, a bilinear form for which the order of a pair of vectors does not affect whether it evaluates to zero.

== Other ==
- Reflexive antagonism, the phenomenon by which muscles with opposing functions tend to antagonistically inhibit each other.
- Reflexive Entertainment, a video game developer
- Reflexivity (social theory), a concept in social theory relating to the capacity of an individual agent to act against influences of socialization and social structure

== See also ==
- Reflection (disambiguation)
- Reflections (disambiguation)
- Self-reflexivity (see Self-reference)
