= Reflector =

Reflector may refer to:

== Science ==
- Reflector, a device that causes reflection (for example, a mirror or a retroreflector)
- Reflector (photography), used to control lighting contrast
- Reflecting telescope
- Reflector (antenna), the part of an antenna that reflects radio waves
- Reflector (cipher machine), a component of some rotor machines in cryptography
- Reflector (microsatellite), space debris research microsatellite
- Reflector, the newsletter of the Boston section of the Institute of Electrical and Electronics Engineers
- Reflector, in math, the left adjoint in a reflective subcategory
- Neutron reflector, in physics

== Computing ==
- .NET Reflector, code browser utility
- Reflector, in an electronic mailing list, a single email address that reflects (sends/remails) a copy of an email sent to it to other email addresses
- Reflector router, used in a distributed reflected denial of service attack (DRDoS)
- Reflector (cellular automaton), a type of pattern
- Reflector, conferencing system used in the Internet Radio Linking Project

== Music ==
- Reflector (Pablo Cruise album), a 1981 album by Pablo Cruise
- Reflector (Killing Heidi album), a 2000 album by Killing Heidi
- Reflector (PlanetShakers album), a 2002 album by PlanetShakers
- Reflector (band), a rock band based in Beijing

== Other uses ==
- Reflector (Transformers), a fictional character in the Transformers toyline of the 1980s
- The Reflector (disambiguation), several newspapers
- The Daily Reflector, an eastern North Carolina–based newspaper
- Safety reflector, a retroreflector intended for pedestrians or vehicles

== See also ==
- Reflektor, a 2013 Arcade Fire album
- Reflection (disambiguation)
