= Reflection =

Reflection may refer to:

== Science and technology ==
- Reflection (physics), a common wave phenomenon
  - Specular reflection, mirror-like reflection of waves from a surface
    - Mirror image, a reflection in a mirror or in water
  - Diffuse reflection, where ray incident on the surface is scattered
  - Retroreflection, technology for returning light in the direction from which it came
  - Signal reflection, in signal transmission
- Elastic scattering, a process in nuclear and particle physics
- Reflection nebula, a nebula that is extended and has no boundaries
- Reflection seismology or seismic reflection, a method of exploration geophysics

=== Mathematics ===
- Reflection principle, in set theory
- Point reflection, a reflection across a point
- Reflection (mathematics), a transformation of a space
- Reflection formula, a relation in a function
- Reflective subcategory, in category theory
- Reflection symmetry, the property of being unchanged by a reflection

=== Computing ===
- Reflection (computer graphics), simulation of reflective surfaces
- Reflection mapping, an efficient image-based lighting technique for approximating the appearance of a reflective surface by means of a precomputed texture
- Reflection (reflective programming), a computer program that accesses or modifies its own code
- Reflection, terminal emulation software by Attachmate
- Reflection (artificial intelligence), a technique used in large language models (LLMs)

== Arts and entertainment ==
=== Film and television ===
- The Reflection (TV series), an anime series created by Stan Lee and Hiroshi Nagahama
- "Reflection", an episode of Power Rangers: SPD
- Reflection (2018 film), a Burmese film
- Reflection (2021 film), a Ukrainian film
- "The Reflection", an episode of the TV series Pocoyo

=== Music ===
==== Albums ====
- Reflection (Brian Eno album) or the title song, 2017
- Reflection (Demis Roussos album), 1984
- Reflection (Derek Minor album), 2016
- Reflection (Loraine James album), 2021
- Reflection (Fifth Harmony album) or the title song, 2015
- Reflection (Hooverphonic album), 2013
- Reflection (Pentangle album) or the title song, 1971
- Reflection (Redrama album), 2014
- Reflection (The Rubyz album) or the title song, 2011
- Reflection (Steamhammer album), or Steamhammer, 1969
- Reflection (Tofubeats album) or the title song, 2022
- Reflection (Unashamed album) or the title song, 1996
- Reflection: Axiom of the Two Wings, by Mari Hamada, 2008
- The Reflection (album) or the title song, by Keb' Mo', 2011
- Reflection, by Mr. Children, 2015
- Reflection, by the Shadows, 1990
- Reflection, by Rophnan, 2018
- Reflection, by Kelly Chen, 2013

==== Songs ====
- "Reflection" (song), by Christina Aguilera from the soundtrack of the animated Disney film, Mulan (1998)
- "Reflection" (Psychic Fever song), 2025
- "Reflection", by Bobbie Singer, Austria's selection for the Eurovision Song Contest 1999
- "Reflection", by As I Lay Dying from Shadows Are Security, 2005
- "Reflection", by Bleeding Through from Dust to Ashes, 2001
- "Reflection", by BTS from Wings, 2016
- "Reflection", by Jay Chou from Greatest Works of Art, 2022
- "Reflection", by Mirror from One and All, 2019
- "Reflection", by Prince from Musicology, 2004
- "Reflection", by Tool from Lateralus, 2001
- "Reflection", by Visions of Atlantis from Delta, 2011
- "Reflection", by Young Dolph & Key Glock from Dum and Dummer, 2019
- "The Reflection", by The Haunted from The Dead Eye, 2006
- "The Reflection, by Trust Company from True Parallels, 2005

==== Other musical works ====
- Reflection (Britten), composition for viola and piano by Benjamin Britten, 1930

=== Other art ===
- Reflection, installation art by Shane Cooper
- The Reflection, a work of fiction by Hugo Wilcken

== Other uses ==
- Self-reflection, the ability to witness and evaluate our own cognitive, emotional, and behavioural processes
- Reflection, a tool used in reflective practice and education
- Reflective surfaces (climate engineering)
- Reflective writing, an analytical writing practice

== See also ==
- Reflector (disambiguation)
- Reflections (disambiguation)
- Reflexive (disambiguation)
- Reflected (disambiguation)
