= Reflections (Dove) =

1935 painting by Arthur Dove

- Artist: Arthur Garfield Dove
- Year: 1935
- Medium: Oil on canvas
- Dimensions: 38.42 cm × 53.66 cm (15.125 in × 21.125 in)
- Location: Indianapolis Museum of Art; Indianapolis

Reflections is an oil on canvas painting by American artist Arthur Dove from 1935, now in the Indianapolis Museum of Art, in Indianapolis, Indiana, US.

== Description ==
Reflections is a highly representative Dove piece, a flowing abstract landscape with trees under a prominent Sun. The whimsy, organic elements, and prominent Sun and Moon are all characteristic themes of his work. Although at first glance a straightforward landscape, Dove once referred to it as "Reflections (from headlights in car)", indicating a more complex possible reading.

== Historical information ==
In 1910, Dove became the first American to paint an abstract work. His bold, emotional paintings earned him membership in the Stieglitz Group, a cadre of Americans devoted to modernism. In 1933, he moved to Geneva, New York, to live on his family estate. Though unhappy with the region's provincial character, he remained for five years. His work underwent a profound shift in this period, as his artistic and geographic isolation led him to concentrate on scenes from his bucolic surroundings and the "purely formal appeal of natural objects' shapes and lines, which he emphasized to the point of abstraction with organic shapes and unexpected color schemes". Reflections was created squarely in the middle of his Geneva period.

=== Location history ===
Dove first sold Reflections to his long-time friend and patron Alfred Stieglitz in New York. It was then added to the collection of the Downtown Gallery in New York before being acquired by Mr. and Mrs. Denman of Bellevue, Washington. The work then shuttled through private and corporate collections before returning to New York and the Alexandre Gallery, from which it was purchased by the IMA. It is currently housed in the Paine American Modernism Gallery.

=== Acquisition ===
Reflections was purchased in 2003 from the Alexandre Gallery courtesy of the Caroline Marmon Fesler Fund. Its accession number is 2003.161.
