= The Reflections (Indianapolis band) =

The Reflections were an Indianapolis vocal group who had a regional hit with "In the Still of the Night"/"Tic Toc" (Tigre 602, 1963) before changing their name to Stark Naked & The Car Thieves in 1966.
