= Caroline Marmon Fesler =

American collector

- Born: Caroline Marmon; 1878; Richmond, Indiana
- Died: December 28, 1960 (aged 81–82); Crown Hill Cemetery and Arborteum
- Resting place: Crown Hill Cemetery and Arborteum Sec 29, Lot 44
- Education: Smith College
- Spouse: James William Fesler

Caroline Marmon Fesler (1878 – December 28, 1960) was an American art and music patron, cultural philanthropist, and fine-art collector. Her contributions to the Indianapolis, Indiana, arts community included financial support and gifts of fine art to the Art Association of Indianapolis (the forerunner to the Indianapolis Museum of Art and the Indiana University – Purdue University Indianapolis Herron School of Art and Design), in addition to serving as a board member of Herron School of Art (1916–1947) and president of the Art Association of Indianapolis (1941–1947). Fesler was also a patron of the Indianapolis Symphony Orchestra and founded the city's Ensemble Music Society. Her major art collecting interests and acquisitions tended toward Post-Impressionist and modernist paintings, although not exclusively, and included paintings by Georges Braque, Paul Cézanne, Marc Chagall, Henri Matisse, Pablo Picasso, Georgia O'Keeffe, Georges Seurat, and Vincent van Gogh, among others. The Marmon Memorial Collection, which Fesler established in honor of her parents, remains an important part of the Indianapolis Museum of Art's permanent collections.

== Early life and education ==
Caroline Marmon was born in 1878 in Richmond, Indiana, to Elizabeth (Carpenter) (1849–1940) and Daniel W. Marmon (1844–1909). Caroline's father, a mechanic and engineer, was a principle of the Nordyke and Marmon Company, a manufacturer of milling equipment that provided the base of the family's wealth. When she was still young the family moved to Indianapolis, Indiana, where her father became president of a local power and light company and later founded the Marmon Motor Car Company, a luxury automobile manufacturer. Her two older brothers, Walter C. Marmon (1872–1940) and Howard Carpenter Marmon (1876–1943), followed their father into the family's automobile manufacturing business.

Marmon grew up in Indianapolis, where she attended local public schools and May Wright Sewall's Girls' Classical School. After graduating from Smith College in Northampton, Massachusetts, in 1900, Marmon studied painting in Paris. Although she did not become an artist herself, Marmon further developed her lifelong interests in art, music, and French culture while living in France.

== Marriage ==
Caroline Marmon married James William Fesler (1864–1949), a prominent Indianapolis attorney on June 2, 1917. Fesler, who became a senior partner in the law firm of Fesler, Elam and Young, was a graduate of Indiana University (A.B. degree in 1887; honorary doctorate degree in 1940). He was also as a member of the IU Board of Trustees (1902–1936) and served as the board's vice president (1916–1919) and president (1919–1936). In 1920 he made an unsuccessful run as a Republican candidate for governor of Indiana. The Feslers, who resided at 4035 North Pennsylvania Street in Indianapolis, had no children. Caroline Fesler inherited from her mother the Marmon family's lakeside summer home at 1100 East Shore Drive at Lake Maxinkuckee.

== Career ==
Fesler's leadership and cultural philanthropy reflected her major interests in fine art and music. Her lifelong contributions to the Indianapolis arts community included financial support and acquisitions of fine art, especially gifts of 20th-century modern art. An avid art collector and arts patron, she supported the work of the Art Association of Indianapolis (the forerunner to the Indianapolis Museum of Art and the IUPUI Herron School of Art and Design) for several decades, in addition to serving as president of the Arts Association in the 1940s, when the association maintained the John Herron Art Museum and the Herron art school. Fesler also enjoyed classical music. She was a patron of the Indianapolis Symphony Orchestra and founded the city's Ensemble Music Society.

=== Art collector ===
Pablo Picasso's Ma Jolie (1914)

Fesler's major art collecting interests and acquisitions tended toward Post-Impressionist and modernist paintings, although not exclusively. She collected paintings by Paul Cézanne, Pablo Picasso, Georges Seurat, and Georgia O'Keeffe, who was also a personal friend, and other artists.

Fesler's early art collecting efforts for the Art Association of Indianapolis began as a member of the Gamboliers, a group of Indianapolis art patrons who pooled their funds to acquire the works of contemporary artists whose reputations had not yet been established in the art world and whose work was not yet receiving significant interest from major art collectors and art museums. The group existed from 1927 to 1934 and then disbanded, but its contributions helped build the Herron Museum's modern art collection, in addition to introducing "modern art to a wider audience." The museum accepted 155 works from the Gamboliers. Among the group's most notable acquisitions for the museum was Henri de Toulouse-Lautrec's color lithograph, Moulin Rouge: La Goulue, in 1936.

Fesler also acquired works of art on her own that she anonymously donated to the Art Association's Herron Museum. In the early 1940s her widowed mother, Elizabeth Marmon, made a $1 million bequest to each of her three children as part of their inheritance from their industrialist father, Daniel Marmon. Fesler used the bulk of her inherited funds from this gift to acquire a collection of paintings that she planned from the outset to donate to the Art Association's museum as a memorial to her parents. During the 1940s Fesler acquired for the museum a collection of eight paintings by Meindert Hobbema, Corneille de Lyon, Aelbert Cuyp, Jacob van Ruisdael, Vincent van Gogh, Willem Kalf, Georges Seurat, and Paul Cézanne. Although her acquisitions were made anonymously, it was not a well-kept secret at the museum that Fesler was the source of the gifts. When she did become publicly known as the donor, Art News described her as "a new kind of patron," one who acquired works of art directly for the museum and not for herself.

=== Philanthropic leadership ===
Fesler's contributions to the Herron museum and art school in Indianapolis did not begin or end with her donations of fine art. She also provided substantial financial support and leadership. Fesler served as a board member of the Herron School of Art from 1916 to 1947, and remained active on several committees at the Art Association, including its Fine Arts Committee and the Art School Committee. In 1941 Fesler succeeded Evans Woolen II as president of the Art Association of Indianapolis and continued to serve in that role until 1947, when she resigned for health reasons. Fesler's generous support of the organization continued through bequests made in her will following her death in 1960.

In 1928 the construction of a new Herron art school building on the Art Association's property at 16th and Pennsylvania Streets was made possible through an anonymous $200,000 gift, which the association's leadership knew was Fesler's donation. The old art school building was demolished and replaced with a new facility designed by Paul Philippe Cret, a French architect whose firm was located in Philadelphia, Pennsylvania, and Robert Frost Daggett of Indianapolis. The new art school building was dedicated on September 5, 1929.

In 1933 Fesler spearheaded the decision to separate the Herron art school from the museum under separate directors. While Wilbur Peat remained the head of the Herron museum, Fesler led a search for the Herron art school's first director, recommending artist and New York art educator Donald Mattison for the position and offering to pay his salary.

In 1940 Fesler's financial support shifted from the Herron art school to the museum, beginning with a remodeling of its 16th Street museum building in 1940–41. She made an anonymous $50,000 donation in support of renovations to the building that was combined with additional funds of $85,000 from other sources to complete the project. Beginning in December 1943 and continuing over a period of about eighteen months, Fesler also made a series of acquisitions that she donated the Art Institute to fill what she considered to be gaps in the museum's collections.

Fesler's first major gifts of art to the Herron museum included eight paintings that formed the core of The Marmon Memorial Collection, named in honor of her parents. The artworks included Hobbema's The Water Mill (The Trevor Landscape); Corneille's Portrait of a Man with a Glove; Cuyp's The Valkhof at Nijmegen; Ruisdael's Landscape with Cascade; Van Gogh's Landscape at Saint-Remy (Enclosed Field with Peasant) ; Kalf's Still Life with a Chinese Porcelain Jar; Seurat's The Channel of Gravelines, Petit Fort Philippe; and Cézanne's House in Provence. These additions to Herron's collections helped the museum attain national stature among U.S. art museums. She also acquired Georgia O'Keeffe's Grey Hills, and donated her friend's painting to the Herron museum in 1943. Fesler made other donations of fine art to the Art Association, even when the selection proved to be controversial. One instance occurred in 1944 after members of Herron's arts committee, preferring more conservative works from well-established artists, declined to purchase Pablo Picasso's Ma Jolie (1914). Fesler acquired the painting herself and bequeathed it to the museum in 1960.

Fesler's support of the Art Association continued after her death. In her will she bequeathed to the organization a $500,000 gift for improvements to the Herron museum/art school at its 16th Street site. Herron's board approved the use of $300,000 from the bequest to build a three-story wing for the Herron art school. Indianapolis architect Evans Woollen III designed the new building, which was constructed at the northwest corner of the Paul Philippe Cret-designed building that Fester had funded in 1928. In addition to Picasso's Ma Jolie (1914), Fesler bequeathed several more paintings from her private collection to the Herron museum. These works included Picasso's Music, Henri Matisse's Seated Girl, Georges Braque's Still Life with Red Fish, Giorgio di Chireo's Street of Arcades, Marc Chagall's Horse and Rider, and Marie Laurencen's Circus Horse.

=== Music patron ===
In addition to art, Fesler enjoyed classical music, especially chamber music. She was also a patron of the Indianapolis Symphony Orchestra. In 1944 she founded Indianapolis's Ensemble Music Society and served as its vice president. Fesler was especially known for frequently hosting private chamber music concerts performed by renowned musical groups at her Indianapolis home. She also became acquainted with numerous musicians, including Alexander Schnieder, who collaborated with pianist Eugene Istomin at one of her annual concert events.

== Death and legacy ==
Fesler died at her home in Indianapolis on December 28, 1960. Her remains are interred at Crown Hill Cemetery in Indianapolis.

Evans Woollen III considered Fesler to be Indianapolis's "first lady of the arts." The Marmon Memorial Collection, which she began in the mid-1940s, remains intact at the Indianapolis Museum of Art. Blanche Stillson, who knew Fesler well, wrote that her longtime friend had "an intuitive appreciation of quality." Fesler's "keen eye" and generous donations brought what Ellen Lee, an Indianapolis Museum of Art curator called "the bones of a great collection" to Indianapolis.

The Herron Art Institute's Paul Cret-designed building, constructed in 1928 from funding that Fesler provided, and Fesler Hall, the three-story modern building designed by Evans Woollen III that was funded through a Fesler bequest and completed in 1962, are still standing. The two historic buildings serve as the campus for the present-day Herron High School.

The Ensemble Music Society continues to operate in Indianapolis. Its 2018–2019 season marks the 75th anniversary of its founding.

== Honors and tributes ==
In 1961, to honor Caroline Marmon Fesler, the Indianapolis Museum of Art mounted a memorial exhibition, "Tribute to Caroline Marmon Fesler, Collector: Exhibition of Paintings, November 15 to December 17, 1961, Herron Museum of Art, Indianapolis, Indiana."
