= The Seamstress (painting) =

Painting by Édouard Vuillard

- La Ravaudeuse aux chiffons (French)
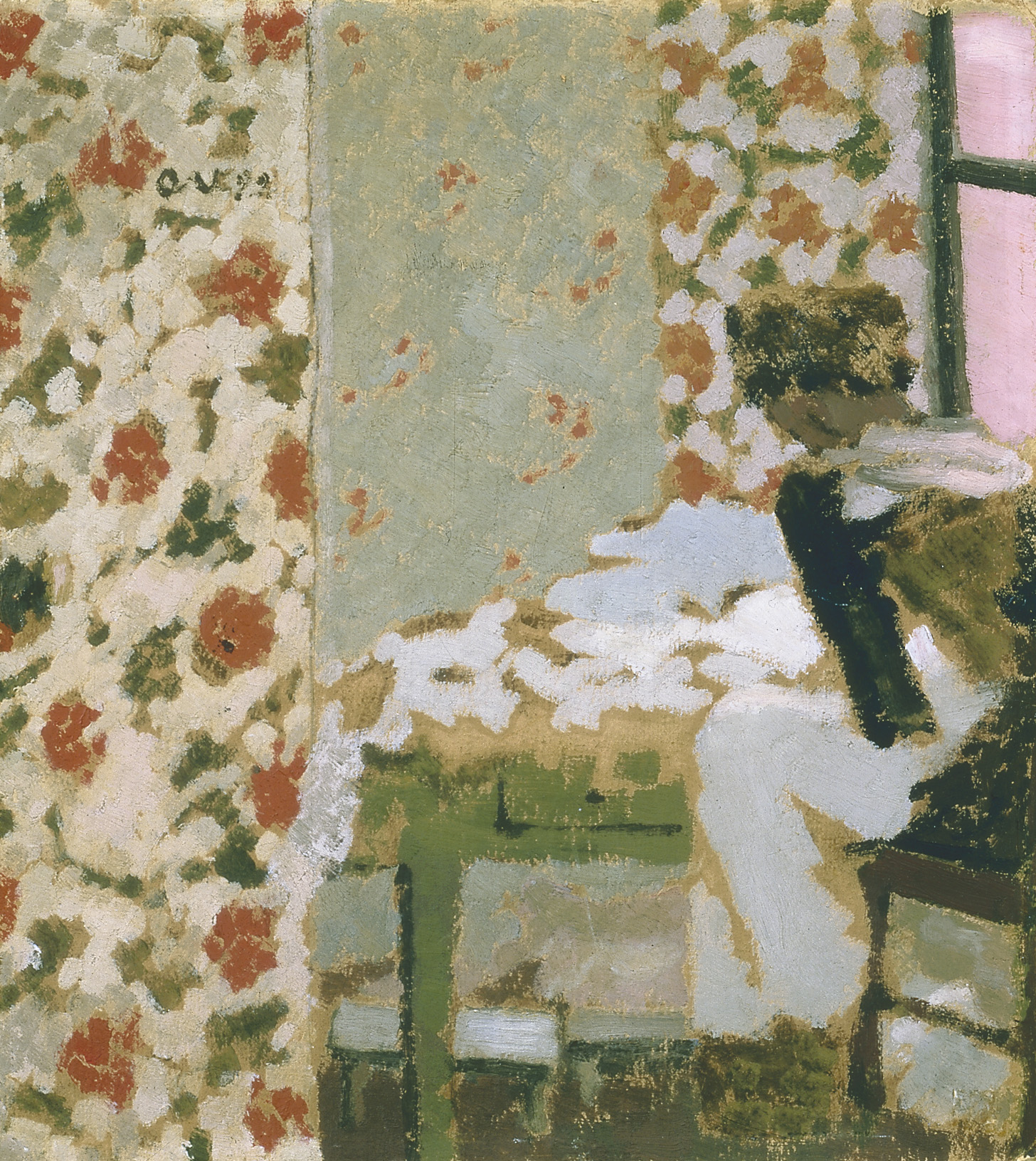
- Artist: Édouard Vuillard
- Year: 1893
- Type: Oil painting on board
- Dimensions: 28 cm × 25 cm (11 in × 10 in)
- Location: Indianapolis Museum of Art; Indianapolis

The Seamstress is an 1893 oil painting by French artist Édouard Vuillard, located in the Indianapolis Museum of Art, which is in Indianapolis, Indiana. It is a small, intimate image of a woman sewing.

== Description ==
The Seamstress depicts a woman with her back to the viewer, sewing in front of a window. A feeling of three-dimensionality is created by the juxtaposition of vividly patterned wallpaper with plain grey walls. The painting seems almost unfinished, since Vuillard left the underlying board exposed in the table, the seamstress' dress, and the wall. The stripe of wallpaper that dominates the left third of the composition is ambiguously related to the rest of the room, leaving the viewer to decide their orientation to the subject. The interplay of those beiges, browns, and reds with the stark, flat pink of the window (a Vuillard hallmark) fills that ambiguous space with intensity. The scraps of cloth and wallpaper create patterns of color and shape as visually arresting as the subject matter.

== Historical information ==
Vuillard is most famous for indoor scenes such as this, which reveal the details of their subjects' lives in claustrophobic detail. Most of his 1890s output was small, domestic, and feminine as a result of the artist's corset-maker mother's heavy influence on his life. The physical, though not emotional, diminutiveness, of these early works dissatisfied Vuillard, who used his connections to spend the rest of his lengthy career focusing on large decorative panels. For these, he abandoned his distinctive style and moved to more conventional depictions of objects and space. Thus, the current artistic consensus is that his career peaked in his first decade, though he was active for more than forty years. As an eager young student, he had helped form les Nabis, a group of progressive artists inspired by Gauguin and the Symbolists. They prioritized the abstract and decorative functions of shape and color. As he grew more conventional, Vuillard abandoned such visually engaging habits.

=== Location history ===
The Seamstress has been on view in many locations, including Le Barc de Boutteville of Paris in 1893; the McLellan Galleries in Glasgow in 1920; the Lefevre Gallery in London in 1945; a traveling exhibition of Vuillard's intimate interiors that reached Houston, Washington, D.C., and Brooklyn in 1989-1990; and a comprehensive retrospective arranged by the National Gallery of Art in D.C., the Montreal Museum of Fine Arts, the Galeries nationales du Grand Palais in Paris, and the Royal Academy of Arts in London in 2003-2004.

=== Acquisition ===
The IMA acquired The Seamstress in 1969 as a gift of Blanche Stillson in memory of Caroline Marmon Fesler. It has the acquisition number 69.68. It is currently on display in the Sidney and Kathy Taurel gallery.
