= Nordyke =

Nordyke is a surname. Notable people with the surname include:

- Addison H. Nordyke, American industrialist
- David Nordyke (1952–2003), American educator
- Deborah Nordyke (born 1962), American biathlete
- Lou Nordyke (1876–1945), American baseball player
- Micajah Thomas Nordyke (1847–1919), American painter

== See also ==
- Nevada State Route 339, aka Nordyke Road
- Nordyke v. King, American lawsuit
- Nordyke Marmon & Company, American company
