= Nicholas Tchkotoua =

Georgian writer

His Illustrious Highness Prince Nicholas Tchkotoua
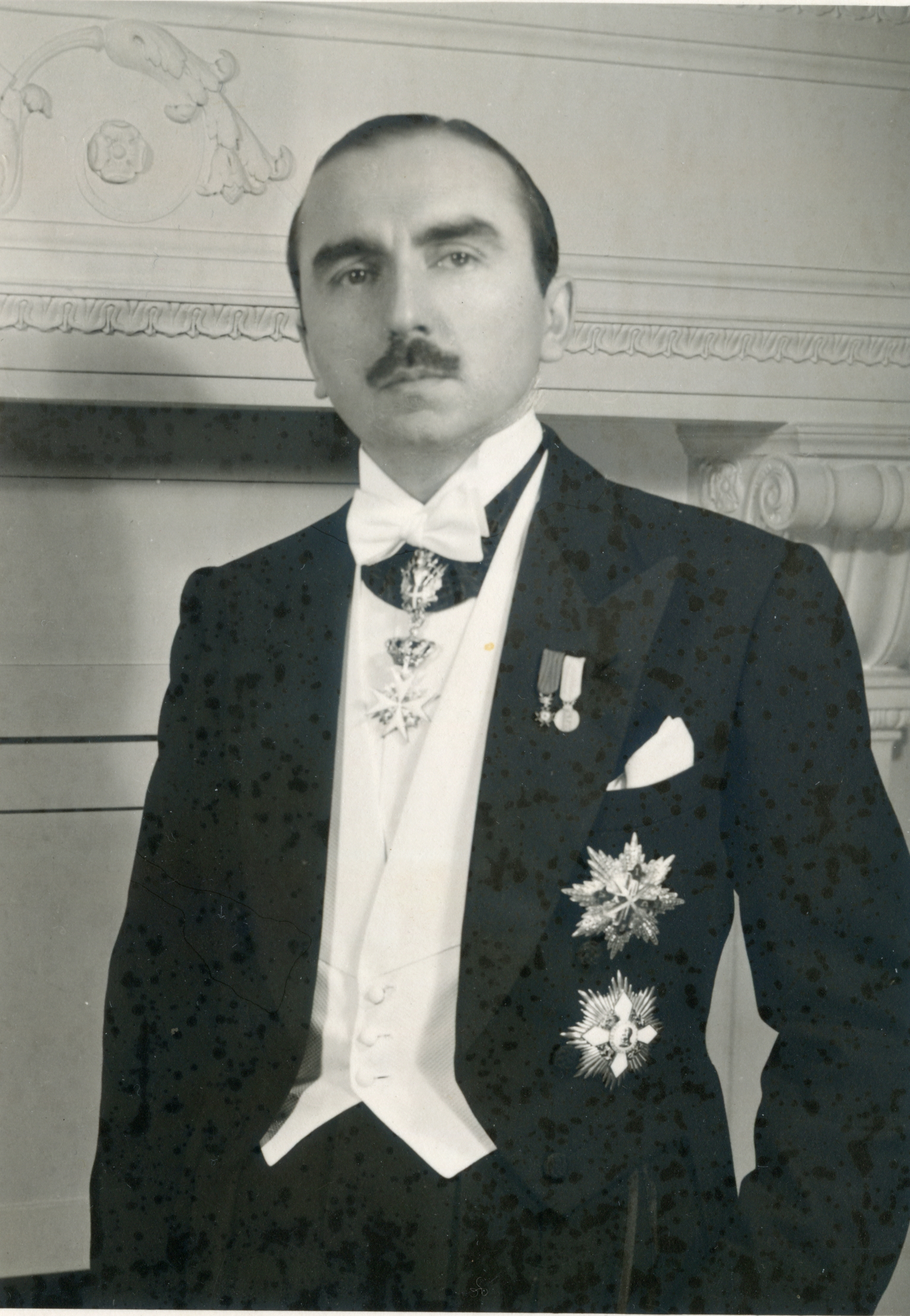
- Born: September 24, 1909; Batumi, Georgia
- Died: 13 May 1984 (aged 74); Lausanne, Switzerland
- Occupations: Author and Ambassador of the Order of Malta
- Spouse: Carol Carpenter Marmon
- Children: Tamara, Zourab, Nina, Charles, Marina, Dimitri
- Website: www.tchkotoua.com

His Serene Highness Prince Nicholas Tchkotoua (1909-1984) was a Georgian writer and a prominent member of the Order of Malta. He fled his homeland after the takeover by the Bolsheviks in 1921.

== Early life and ancestry ==
Tchkotoua Family Coat of Arms

Born into the House of Tchkhotua, an old Georgian noble family, which later became also part of the Russian nobility, as the son of Prince Chalva Charles Tchkhotua (1873-1931) and his wife and cousin, Princess Pelagia Platonovna Tchkhotua (1883-1943). He had one brother, Prince Zourab.

== United States ==
Tchkotoua was educated in France and Switzerland and settled in the US in 1933, where he met and married Carol Marmon, only daughter of Howard Carpenter Marmon (creator of the Marmon Wasp) whilst at the Marmon Motor Car Company). One of his children was Zourab Tchkotoua (1937-2019), a close friend and confidant of Gunter Sachs for many decades.

In 1949, Tchkotoua published a novel he wrote in English, claimed as the first-ever internationally published novel written by a Georgian. In the novel, set in Tbilisi, Lausanne and Paris before the First World War, Georgian Prince Shota's love for his Taya, a Russian princess, remains faithful even when outside forces manipulate their emotions, prize them apart and Shota ends up betrothed to an American. But it is the emotion, rather than the betrothal, that concerns the author. A new, re-edited version of the novel was published in 2008 to some acclaim.

== Death-wish ==
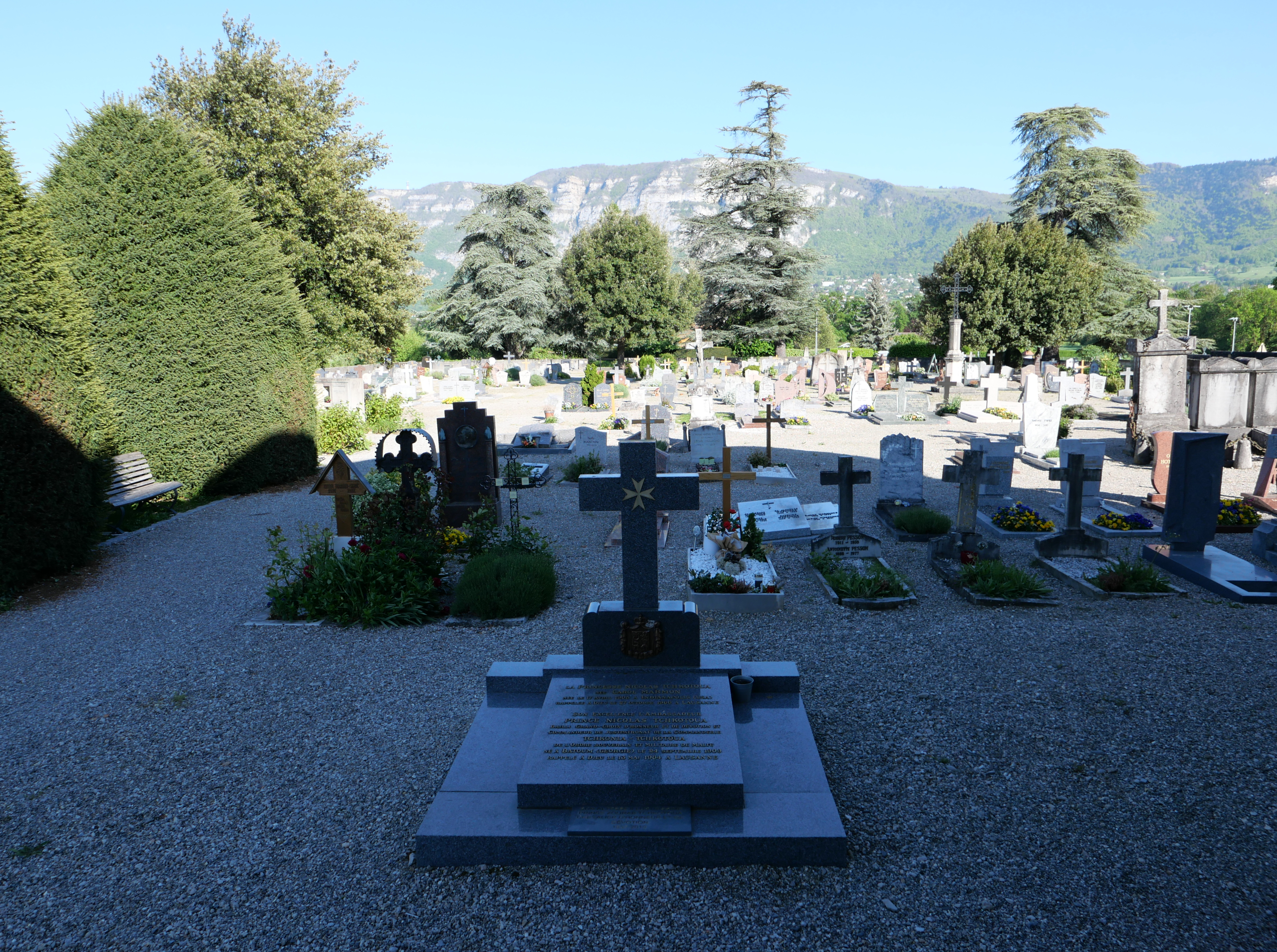
The family grave in 2024.

Tchkotoua and his family later moved to Lausanne, Switzerland, where he died in 1984. He found his final resting place next to his wife, who had already died in 1966, at the cemetery of Compesières in Bardonnex, a municipality in the Swiss canton of Geneva, where the Compesières Commandry of the Order of Malta is located. One of their sons - the car racing driver Zourab (1937-2019) - was buried in the family grave as well.

Tchkotoua had asked that after his death his heart be buried in Georgia. In 1988 his family smuggled it back to the cemetery in Vera, Tbilisi, where it lies to this day.
