= Owen Nacker =

American automotive engineer (1883–1959)

- Born: Owen Milton Nacker; November 7, 1883; Highland Township, Oakland County, Michigan
- Died: May 4, 1959 (aged 75); Pleasant Ridge, Michigan
- Occupation: Automotive engineer
- Years active: 1900s-1950s
- Spouse: Pearl Leonard

Owen Nacker (November 7, 1883 in Highland Township, Oakland County, Michigan – May 4, 1959 in Pleasant Ridge, Michigan) was an American automotive engineer.

== Early Automotive Career ==
Nacker was a consultant to Alanson Partridge Brush (February 10, 1878 – March 6, 1952 in Michigan) of the Brush Motor Car Company, makers of light car, the Runabout. As such he worked on the V-16 project at the Marmon Motor Car Company with Howard Marmon. This project was newly begun before Nacker left Marmon.

== Cadillac engine development ==
He was recruited in 1926 by Cadillac general manager Lawrence P. Fisher (October 19, 1888 in Norwalk, Ohio – September 3, 1961 in Detroit, Michigan) to work at the Cadillac Division of General Motors Corporation (GM). Nacker became head of engine development. He designed a 45 degree Overhead valve V-8 with an aluminum crankcase, five main bearings, counterweighted crankshaft with a front vibration damper and timing chain driving the generator. Cylinder blocks included cast nickel-iron liners extending into the crankcase with cast iron heads. This was the engine for Cadillac Division's new 1927 LaSalle companion model.

Nacker was lead development engineer of the Cadillac V-16 engine project. This was probably the first car engine to be styled for aesthetics as well as function. Finned aluminum valve covers were used and wiring and piping were hidden under covers and panels and enamel was used on some engine surfaces. Nacker also developed Cadillac's V-12 that shared tooling and many components with the V-16.

Nacker also was the leader of the 1936 monobloc Cadillac V-8 engine development with John E "Jack" Gordon also in the later stages. This new V-8 was so smooth and powerful it rendered the V-12 obsolete. Therefore, the V-12 was dropped from production after the 1937 model year.

== Hydramatic transmission ==
Nacker was also part of the team of engineers that developed the General Motors Hydramatic automatic transmission.

Both the monobloc Cadillac V-8 and Hydramatic transmission were used in the M5 version of the Stuart tank during World War II.

== Family ==
Owen Milton Nacker was the son of Harmon Nacker (September 30, 1857 in Dearborn, Michigan – November 17, 1913 in Milford, Michigan) and Dora Law (June 24, 1864 – Jun 28, 1918 in Highland, Michigan). They were married on November 22, 1882. Owen married Pearl Leonard (March 18, 1887 in Novi, Michigan – January 29, 1979) on November 23, 1904 in Highland, Michigan.
