= House in Provence =

Painting by Paul Cézanne

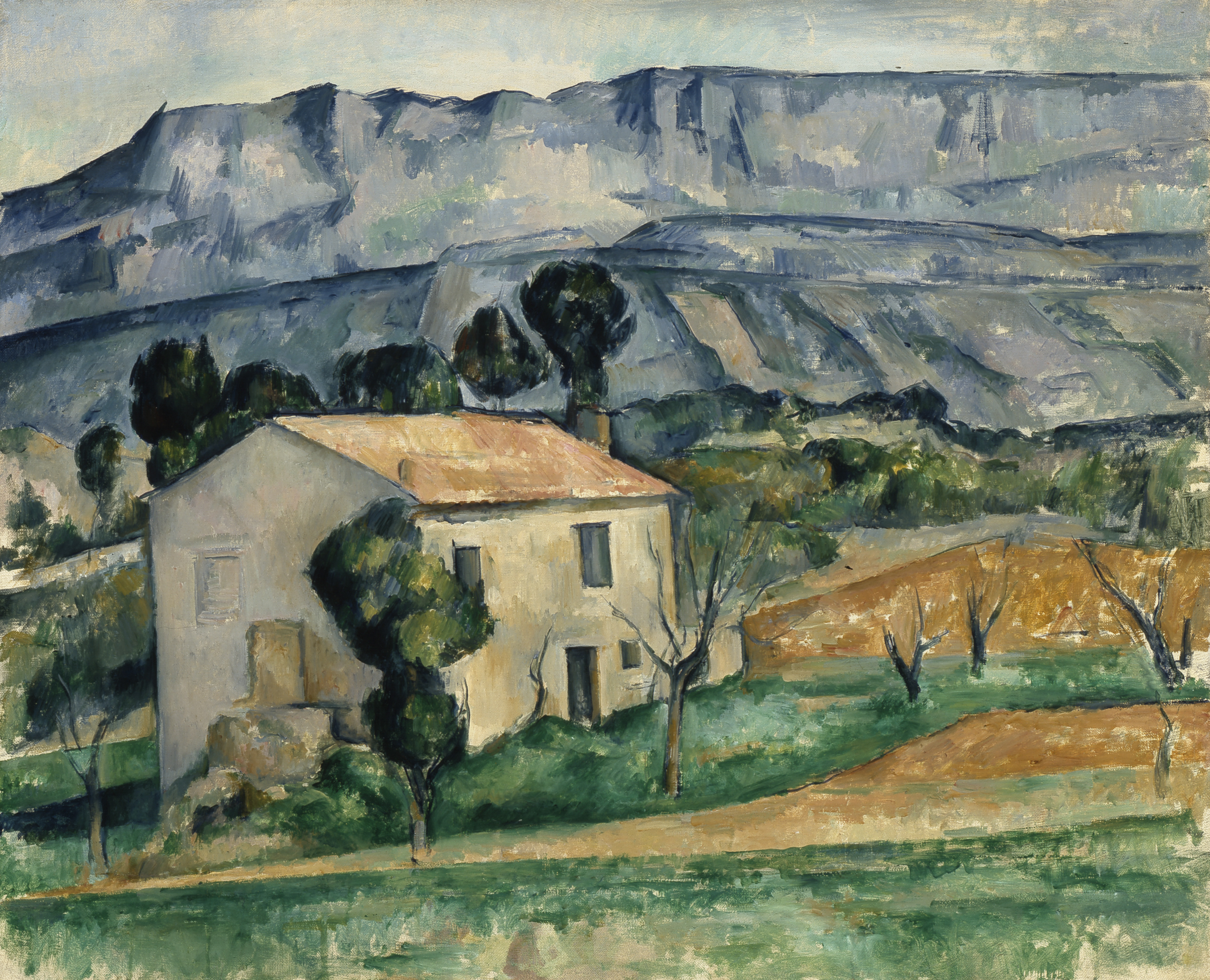
- Artist: Paul Cézanne
- Year: 1886-90
- Type: Oil painting on canvas
- Dimensions: 65 cm × 81 cm (25.5 in × 32 in)
- Location: Indianapolis Museum of Art, Indianapolis

House in Provence (French title: Maison devant la Sainte-Victoire près de Gardanne) is an oil painting on canvas by the French Post-Impressionist artist Paul Cézanne, from 1886-1890. It is held is part at the Indianapolis Museum of Art.

== Description ==
With muted tones and soft colors, Cézanne painted a home, accented by the gray-blue mountains in the background, the soft greens of the rolling hills, and the brown tones of the fields. Cézanne's dynamic style is best observed closely in this painting; the brushstrokes intersect in dynamic way, creating a patchwork. The brushstrokes create lively movement within the hard lines that border the house and the mountain.

== Historical information ==
House in Provence exemplifies Cézanne's 'mature style'. The painting depicts the region where he lived with his family and where he lived as a youth. This landscape is set on the South side of Montagne Sainte-Victoire, which was a favorite subject of the artist. Cézanne did not share the same interests as the rest of the impressionists, instead focusing his work on the basic structure of his subjects. Here are the horizontal bands of grey-blue, green, and brown, contrasting with the vertical trees and the solidly-built isolated farmhouse.

== Provenance ==
House in Provence was probably bought by the artist Ambroise Vollard. In 1910, it was sold to Henri Bernstein. It was likely sold to Gottlieb Reber in 1918. It was sold to Marie Harriman by 1936. In 1945, the piece was purchased by Caroline Marmon Fesler for the John Herron Art Institute, now the Indianapolis Museum of Art, in memory of her parents, Daniel W. and Elizabeth C. Marmon.

== See also ==
- List of paintings by Paul Cézanne
