= Stillson =

Stillson may refer to:

- Blanche Stillson (1889–1977), American artist and author
- Daniel Chapman Stillson (1826-1899), American inventor of the Pipe wrench
- Greg Stillson, antagonist in Stephen King's 1979 novel The Dead Zone
