= Addison H. Nordyke =

American business magnate and manufacturer

Addison H. Nordyke was an American business magnate and manufacturer from Richmond, Indiana. He co-founded E. & A. H. Nordyke mills, later known as Nordyke Marmon & Company.

== Biography ==
In 1858, Nordyke and his father, Ellison Nordyke, formed a partnership in to manufacture and build flour mills. The company was named E. & A. H. Nordyke with a small building just behind Ellis Nordyke's home serving as the first plant. This business continued until 1866 when Daniel W. Marmon joined the firm and the name changed to Nordyke Marmon & Company. Around 1870, Nordyke Marmon & Co. was a major concern in constructing mills. Amos K. Hallowell began with the company in 1875 and stayed through until 1895.

Addison H. Nordyke stayed with the company as an active official until 1899 and as a stockholder and director until 1904. Daniel W. Marmon continued his active official connection with the company until his death in 1909.

In 1887, A. H. Nordyke was a charter member of the Cedar Beach Club of Lake Wawasee, Indiana.

In 1895, Addison Nordyke also signed the $400,000 bond becoming a surety to the Herron School of Art.

== See also ==
- Lake Wawasee History

== Sources ==
- "A Brief History of The Nordyke & Marmon Company"
- Excerpts from "A History of the John Herron Art Institute"
