= Roosevelt (automobile) =

Defunct American motor vehicle manufacturer

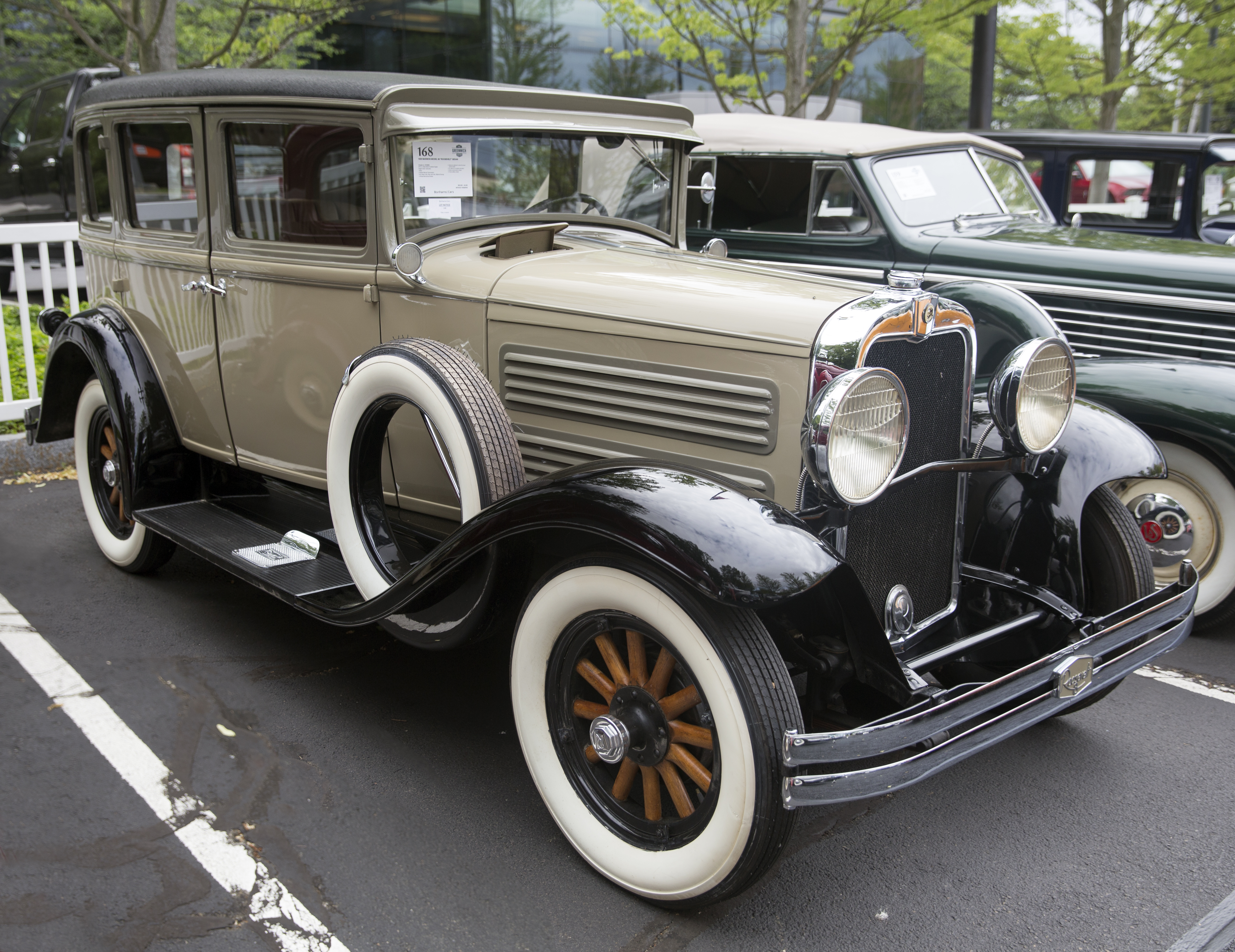
- 1929 Roosevelt Eight Model 68 4-Door Sedan

Overview
- Type: Passenger car
- Manufacturer: Marmon Motor Car Company
- Also called: Marmon-Roosevelt
- Production: 1929-1930
- Designer: Alexis de Sakhnoffsky

Body and chassis
- Body style: Sedan, Coupe, Victoria and Convertible

Powertrain
- Engine: L-head 8-cylinder engine, 201.9 cubic-inches
- Power output: 72 horsepower
- Transmission: 3-speed manual

Dimensions
- Wheelbase: 113 in (2,870 mm)

Chronology
- Successor: Marmon Model 70

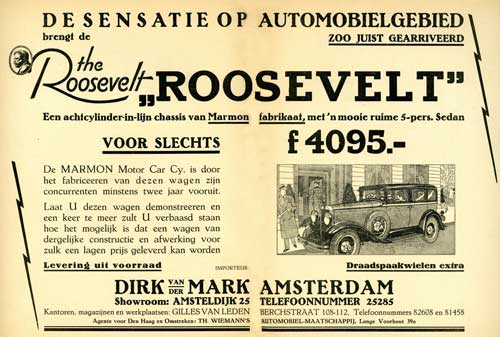
1929 Roosevelt advertisement in Amsterdam

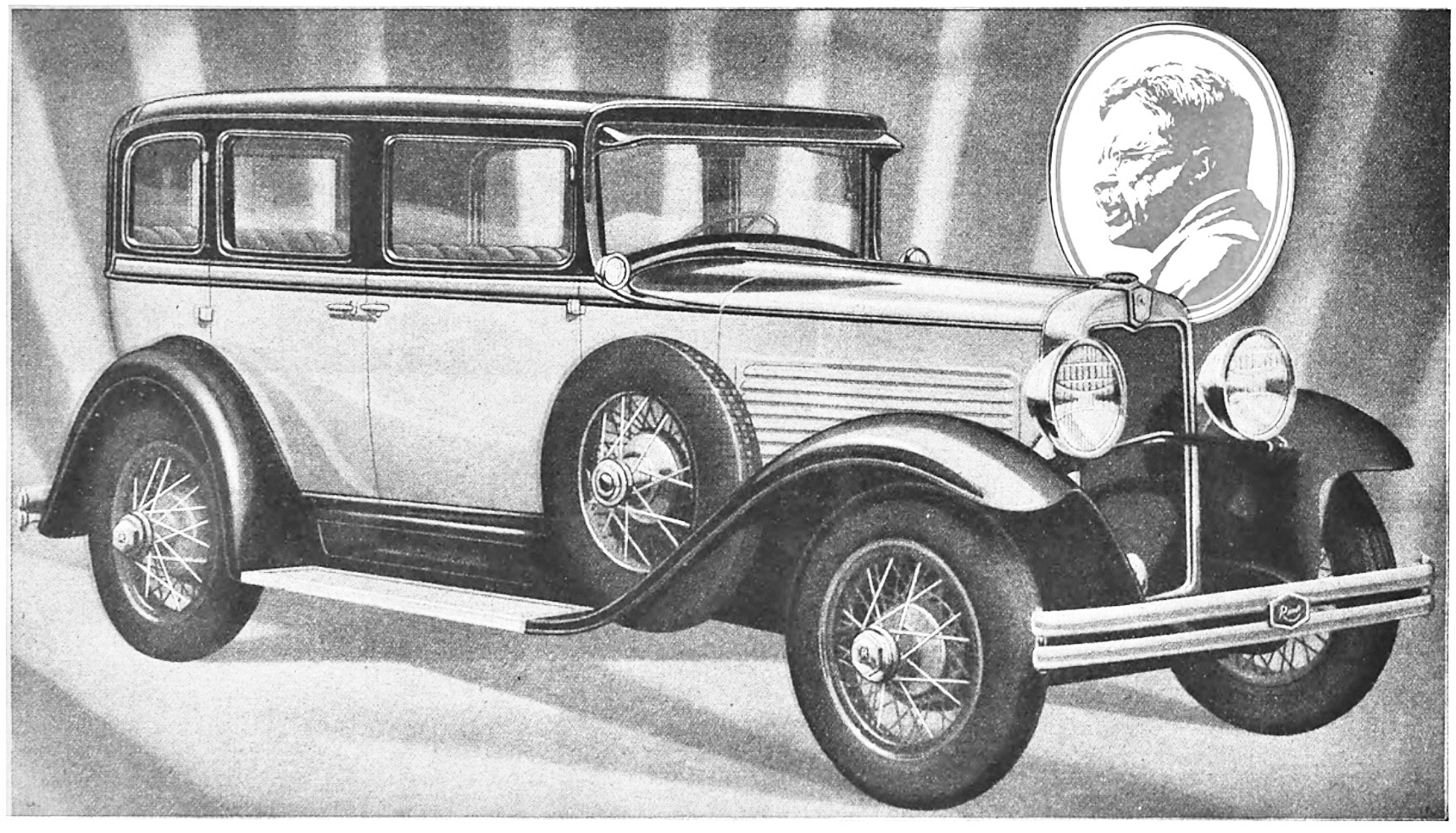
Roosevelt (1929–1930)

Roosevelt was a Vintage era marque of an American automobile that was manufactured by the Marmon Motor Car Company of Indianapolis, Indiana, during the 1929 and 1930 model years.

== History ==
The Roosevelt was named after President Theodore Roosevelt and designed to be priced as an "affordable" automobile, and advertising used the tag line Smart Transportation for the Thrifty. The Roosevelt was the first automobile in America with a straight-eight engine to be priced under $1,000, with the sedan and coupe selling for $995, equivalent to $18,656 in 2025.

Although the Roosevelt name did not appear for the 1931 range of Marmon models, the car was refined into the new Model 70 Marmon.

Sales in 1929 approached 24,500 automobiles, considered an excellent first year for a new marque. One of the unique features of the Roosevelt was the horn button. It served 3 purposes. Push down and it would honk, pull up and it was the starter, and turn it, to turn the head lights on and off. It also had a cameo of Theodore Roosevelt, black and white, on the front top middle of the radiator.
