= Still Life with a Chinese Porcelain Jar =

1669 painting by Willem Kalf

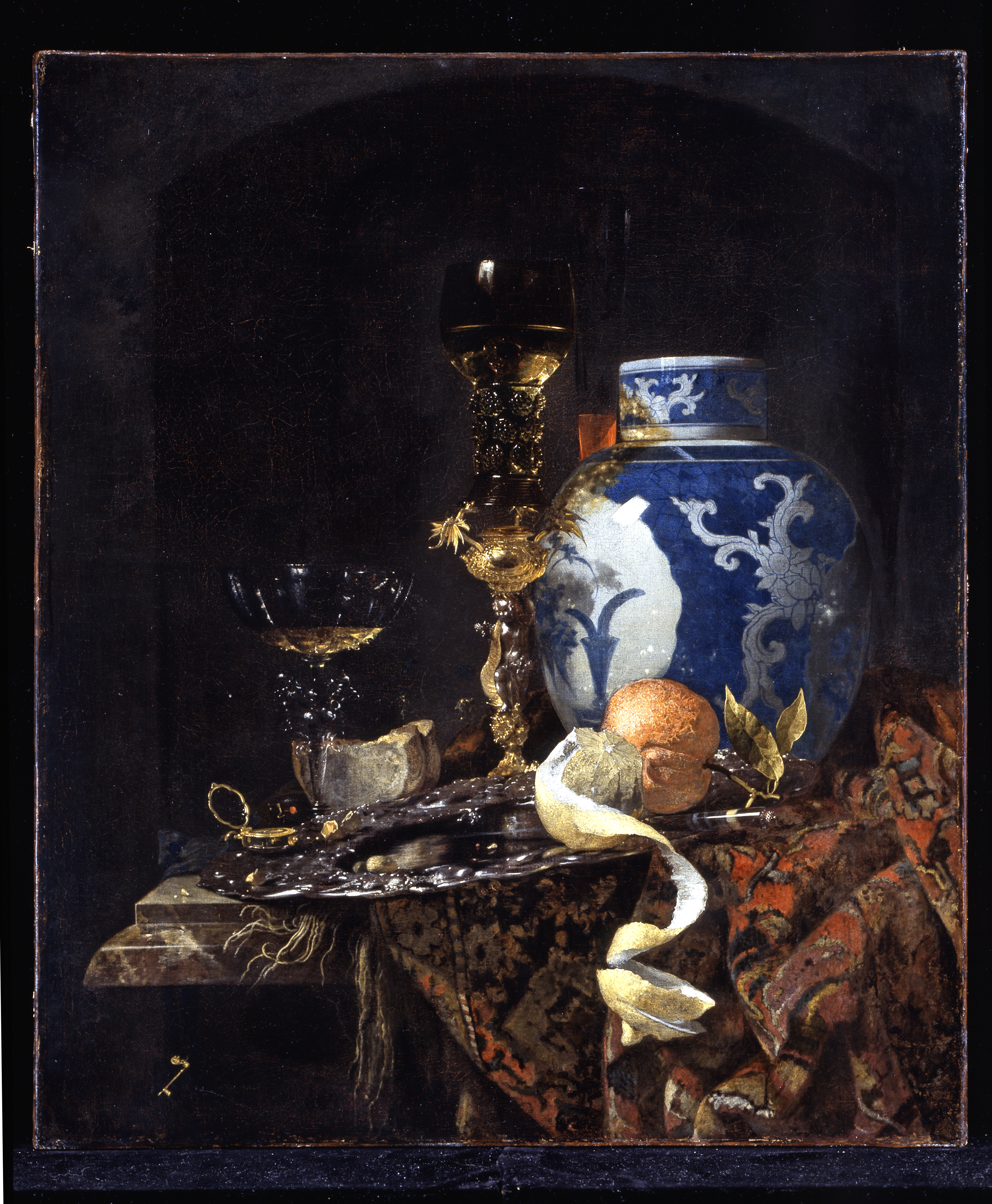
- Artist: Willem Kalf
- Year: 1669
- Type: Oil painting on canvas
- Dimensions: 78.1 cm × 66 cm (30.75 in × 26 in)
- Location: Indianapolis Museum of Art, Indianapolis

Still Life with a Chinese Porcelain Jar is a 1669 oil painting by the Dutch artist Willem Kalf, located in the Indianapolis Museum of Art in Indianapolis, Indiana. It is a sumptuous still life displaying the sort of costly wares that flowed through the Netherlands during its heyday as a trade center.

== Description ==
In Still Life with a Chinese Porcelain Jar, Kalf selected an array of precious objects with which to showcase the wealth and refinement of the Netherlands and his own skills as a painter. Everything is expensive, imported, or both. The citrus fruit, glassware from Venice, and Chinese porcelain jar are evidence of Dutch sailors' enterprise. Local talent is displayed by Dutch silver and a rummer, or wineglass, with a cherub holding a cornucopia at its base. They stand on a marble tabletop with a carelessly crumpled oriental rug. Amid all that luxury is a lesson: a ticking watch on the silver platter reminds the viewer that such earthly riches are fleeting, and worth far less than eternal salvation. The carefully balanced composition, rich colors, and warm tonalities make this painting an object of beauty as well as moral edification.

== Historical information ==
In the 1650s and '60s, as Amsterdam flourished as a hub of commerce and politics, Kalf perfected the pronk (display) still life to exhibit its prosperity. Using an arrangement of objects generally extremely similar to the ones in Still Life with a Chinese Porcelain Jar, depicted with a rich, velvety atmosphere and glistening light, Kalf captured his city's wealth for all to admire. His goal was to render the objects even more beautiful than reality did. This would establish painting as the preeminent art form. Goethe thought he succeeded, saying of Kalf's paintings that "there is no question that should I have the choice of the golden vessels or the picture, I would choose the picture."

=== Acquisition ===
The Herron School of Art acquired this artwork in 1945, a gift of Mrs. James W. Fesler in memory of Daniel W. and Elizabeth C. Marmon. The painting was exhibited in the Chengdu Museum as part of the traveling exhibition "Rembrandt to Monet: 500 Years of European Painting from the Clowes Collection and the Indianapolis Museum of Art at Newfields", which closed on January 4, 2021. The painting has the accession number 45.9.
