= Howard Carpenter Marmon =

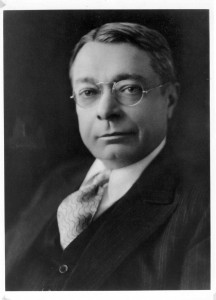
- Born: May 24, 1876; Richmond, Indiana, United States
- Died: April 4, 1943 (aged 66); Fort Lauderdale, Florida, United States
- Burial place: Crown Hill Cemetery and Arboretum
- Occupation: Automotive engineer
- Spouses: Florence Moore Myers (m. 1901; div. 1911) Martha Martindale Foster (m. 1911)
- Children: Carol Carpenter Marmon, later Princess Carol Tchkotoua
- Parent(s): Daniel W. Marmon, Elizabeth Carpenter

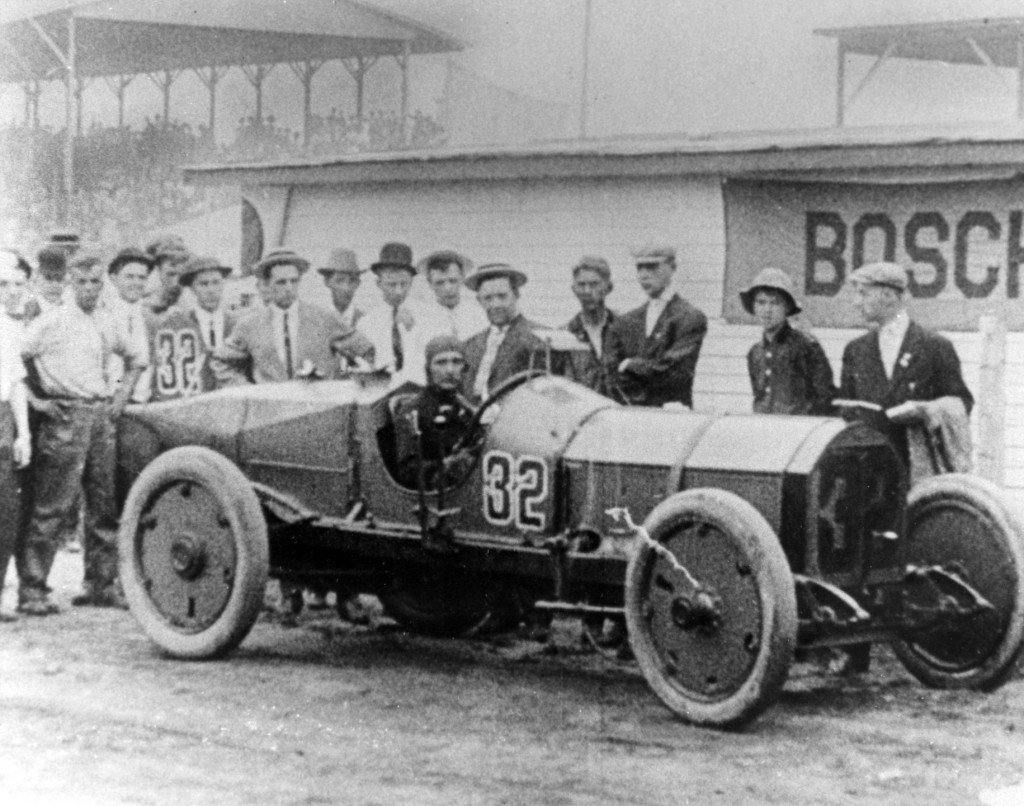
The Wasp, driven by Ray Harroun in the Indianapolis 500

Howard Carpenter Marmon (May 24, 1876 – April 4, 1943) was an American engineer and the founder of the Marmon Motor Car Company. He was a pioneer in automobile engineering credited with several innovations including the use of weight-saving aluminum components in car manufacture, and development of the 16 cylinder V16 engine. He is most known for his creation of the six cylinder Marmon "Wasp", a car driven to victory by the company designer, Ray Harroun in the inaugural Indianapolis 500 race in 1911.

== Biography ==
Howard's father Daniel W. Marmon was a co-founder of the Nordyke and Marmon Company, Indianapolis, a company specialising in flour and grain milling machinery and, by the late 19th century, the largest in the world. Born on May 24, 1876, Howard had an early education in Richmond schools and Earlham College like his father and older brother, Walter. Howard graduated from the University of California, Berkeley in 1886 with a degree in mechanical engineering. He joined the family business in 1899 as chief engineer and along with his brother in the role of CEO built their first car together in 1902. Automotive design and manufacture became their passion and the focus of the brothers from this point on. Towards the end of the First World War the company was awarded a contract to build the Liberty aero engine in response to Walter's offer to support the war effort.

In 1926 the company name changed to the Marmon Motor Car Company. It became known for building high quality and reliable cars, full of revolutionary features the most outstanding being the use of aluminum for the car's body, an integrated rear trunk and hinged doors. He also invented the duplex downdraft manifold and was a pioneer in the use of aluminum, which tremendously reduced the weight of the V16 engines.

From 1913 to 1914 Marmon was president of the Society of Automobile Engineers (SAE International). He was awarded the medal for outstanding automotive design of the year in 1913 for the Marmon Sixteen. He was elected as the only American honorary member of the British Society of the Automotive Engineers.

Marmon produced innovative and stylish automobiles throughout the 1920s, creating especially two successful cars, "The Little Marmon", introduced in 1927 and the "Roosevelt", introduced in 1929.

The Marmon Motor Car Company produced in total some 86 cars before it went into receivership in May 1933 following the Great Depression.

He married Florence Moore Myers on May 8, 1901, in Alameda, California and had one daughter, Carol Carpenter Marmon, later Princess Carol Tchkotoua on her marriage to Prince Nicholas Tchkotoua. The marriage ended in divorce in 1911 and that year he married Martha Martindale Foster, who became the second Mrs. Carpenter Marmon. It is said that Florence lost her husband to her best friend, whose name was never mentioned in the family.

== 1911 and the Inaugural Indianapolis 500 ==
The Automobile reported in its January 26, 1911 issue that Howard Marmon had returned to Indianapolis from the New York automobile show where he had been elected Chairman of the General Rules Committee and Vice-president of the Manufacturers' Contest Association. It continued:

Mr. Marmon is a recognized authority in this realm and his words, owing to his long and successful experiences in all manner of automobile contests and activities, carry considerable weight with both the trade and the public. Particular attention is being paid by Mr. Marmon to the study of four subjects motor car racing, the Glidden Tour, the industry in general and the rules governing contests. "I believe that this seasons motor races will be the best ever," said Mr. Marmon. "This is not idle talk but take my own case for instance. I cannot afford to stop with a jolt, because I have gained too much of practical value. The severe races have helped the study of the construction of my cars and so with every manufacturer. I also believe that the appetite of the public is whetted to a keen taste for automobile speed battles. The 500 mile race proposed at the Indianapolis Motor Speedway promises to attract a great field and will be perhaps the greatest race ever held. Many new firms that have never entered cars before this season will do so this year. Concerning the automotive industry in general, I am an optimist. I am positive that the public demand is steadily growing. The fact that it is steady and not a sudden fad is an encouragement to me. People need automobiles now the same as the telephone or the electric light in their homes."

Howard Marmon was deeply involved in the Manufacturers' Contest Association and related plans for the first 500-mile race anywhere. He also had a more personal plans with regard to the race - to win it, as a fitting climax to sixty years of successful manufacturing by Nordyke & Marmon.

Ray Harroun had decided to retire as National Driving Champion, but Marmon approached him in the drafting room the day after public announcement of the first 500-mile race. Marion George in his "Marmon Racing-Winging It With The Wasp" recounted the conversation:

When Marmon suggested he drive the Wasp "just once more", Ray demurred. "No. I'm finished with racing. You won't need me anyway. Dawson could do it just as well as I could." To this Howard replied that he was considering building another car for Dawson and entering both him and Harroun in the race. "Think about it," he said. Then pouring forth ideas faster than Harroun could reply, he added that he'd like Dawson's car to be a four cylinder ... the same type engine they were offering to the public. "It probably would be just as fast if the piston displacement is comparable. We will not lose the sense of the rule but make it more rigid in application." Harroun replied, when given the chance, "but it wouldn't be as smooth, and I don't believe it would have as much chance of going the distance." Marmon, however, was insistent and asked Harroun to work out some bore and stroke combinations for a four. Within a week he had drafted out preliminary designs and specifications for a large four, and an improved six for the Wasp as well. Yet Harroun remained noncommittal about driving the race, offering all sorts of reasons why he shouldn't, including the fact that "five hundred miles is too far for anyone to drive at high speed." Marmon agreed, but was one step ahead of him on that point. He had a relief driver available, Cyrus Patschke, who was prepared to give Harroun a break at 200 miles. "How about it?" Marmon asked. Harroun, finally, consented and in mid-May the two of them took the Wasp to the track for a preliminary practice.

== Hemlock Hedges estate (Linville Land Harbor) ==
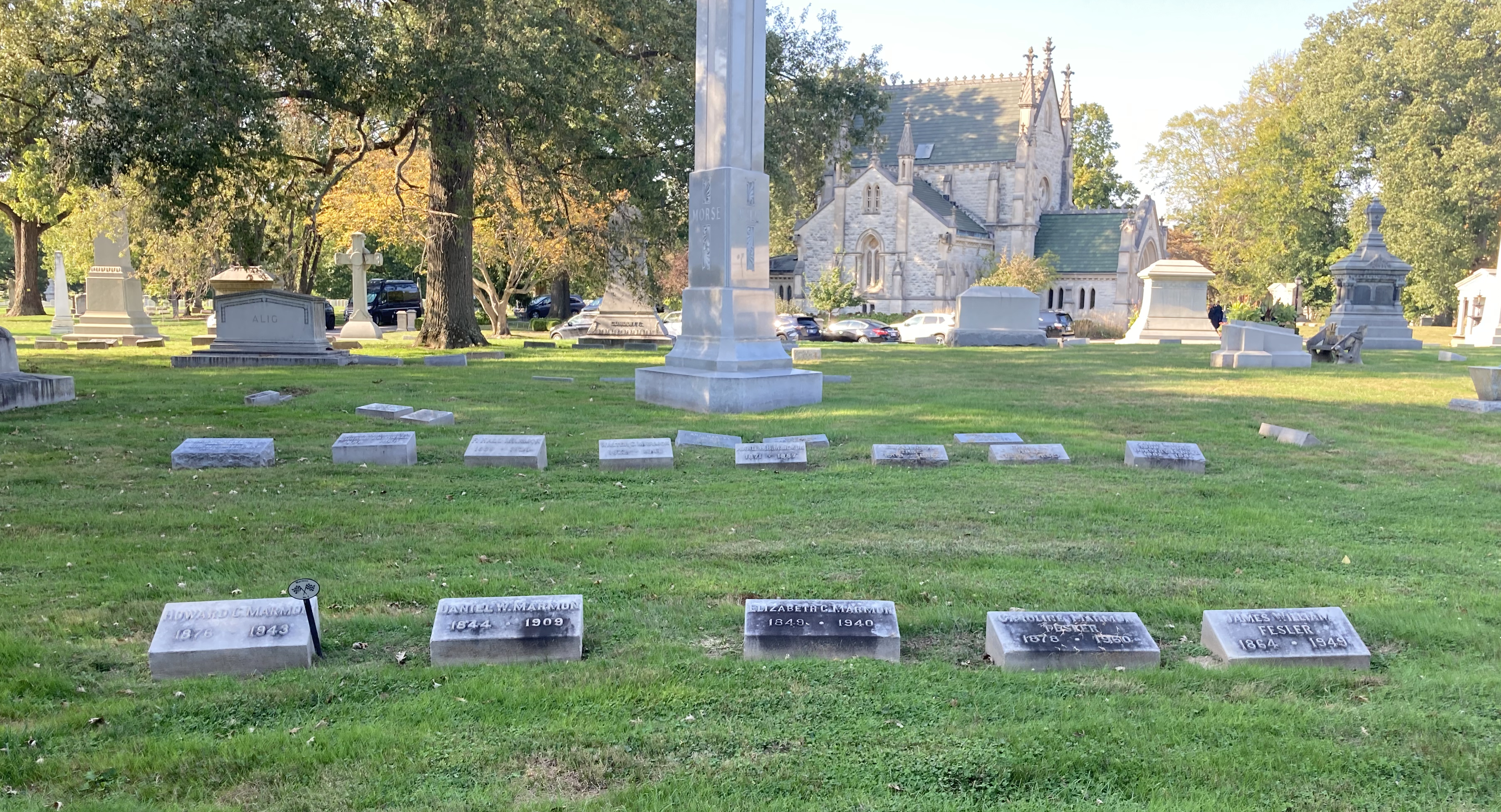
Marmon's grave (front row, leftmost) at Crown Hill Cemetery

In the 1920s, Howard Marmon moved with his wife to the place he loved, the mountains of North Carolina, to make it his permanent home. The town of Pineola had been a center of logging and the Ritter Company owned a large country club and acreage there. The Marmons bought an estate, naming it "Hemlock Hedges," which in time consisted of a 60-acre lake (created after Marmon built a dam on the Linville River), beautiful hardwoods and lawns, a spacious club which they converted into a home, guest houses, servant quarters, workshop, stable, laundry, a water tower and a gatehouse. The gatehouse later served as home to W.C. Tate, as he began his medical career in the mountains. The Marmon home contained a well-filled library, modern conveniences and furnishings from their many travels abroad. The estate received many visitors over the years including inventive giants of the day Henry Ford, Harvey Firestone and Thomas Edison.

Marmon was also a conservationist and built Anthony Lake Nursery to provide continued growth of native shrubs and trees as well as a fish hatchery to replenish local streams and rivers with native fish. This is now in part the site of Linville Land Harbor in Pineola.

The Marmons were devout Presbyterians and contributed to the building of the beautiful church, which still serves the residents of Pineola.

Howard Carpenter Marmon died in Fort Lauderdale, Florida on April 4, 1943, and was buried at Crown Hill Cemetery in Indianapolis.
