= Nordyke Marmon & Company =

American manufacturer of flour mills

Nordyke Marmon & Company was an American manufacturer of flour mills and located in Indianapolis, Indiana, United States.

== Early history ==
The company began in 1851 as the Nordyke, Ham & Company started in the manufacture of milling machinery in a small shop in Richmond, Indiana. Previously, Ellis Nordyke, a prominent millwright, had been making hand made milling equipment himself in Richmond. Buhr stones from France were imported for grinding grains.

In 1858, Addison H. Nordyke and his father, Ellison, formed a partnership in to manufacture and build flour mills. The company was named E. & A. H. Nordyke with a small building just behind Ellis Nordyke's home serving as the first plant. This business continued until 1866 when Daniel W. Marmon joined the firm and the name changed to Nordyke Marmon & Company. Around 1870, Nordyke Marmon & Co. was a major concern in constructing mills. Amos K. Hallowell began with the company in 1875 and stayed through until 1895.

Addison H. Nordyke stayed with the company as an active official until 1899 and as a stockholder and director until 1904. Daniel W. Marmon continued his active official connection with the company until his death in 1909.

== Move to Indianapolis ==
In 1875, Nordyke Marmon & Company moved to Indianapolis to obtain better manufacturing and shipping facilities. The "Quaker City Works", located in West Indianapolis adjoining the Indianapolis & Vincennes Railroad and Belt Railroads, was purchased in 1876. The firm grew in this location and became known as America's top mill builder.

Nordyke Marmon exported machinery products to Canada, Mexico, Central and South America furnishing complete machinery equipment for flour mills, corn mills, cereal mills, starch and rice mills and elevators. They made roller mills, bolting machines, packers, blending machinery, rice, corn and starch mill machinery and numerous special machines.

== Marmon Motor Car Company ==
The Marmon sons who were running Nordyke Marmon were dissatisfied with the automobiles of the late 19th and early 20th centuries. In 1902 they built a luxury car to satisfy their own demands. Howard Marmon went on to develop the Marmon Motor Car Company.

Nordyke Marmon & Company was bought out by Allis-Chalmers in 1926 and discontinued making mills.

== Sources ==
- A Brief History of The Nordyke & Marmon Company
- Marmon Motor Car Company
