= Marmon Motor Car Company =

American automobile manufacturer

Coordinates: 39.7520492°N 86.1808944°W

- Industry: Automobile
- Founded: 1902; 124 years ago
- Defunct: 1933; 93 years ago
- Fate: Renamed
- Successor: Marmon-Herrington
- Headquarters: Indianapolis, Indiana, United States
- Key people: Howard Carpenter Marmon, Ray Harroun, Owen Nacker, James Bohannon
- Products: Vehicles, parts

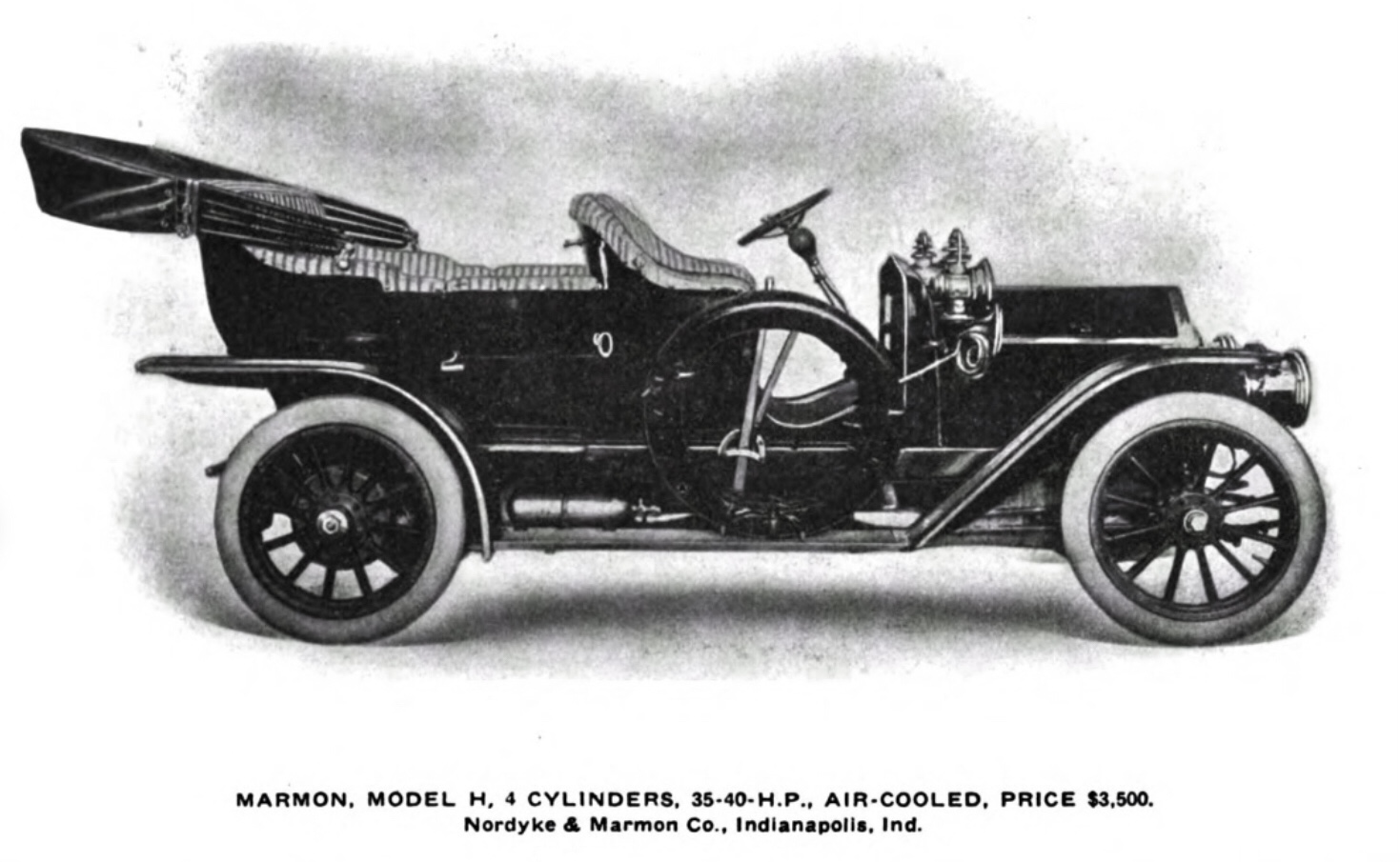
Marmon Model H (1908)

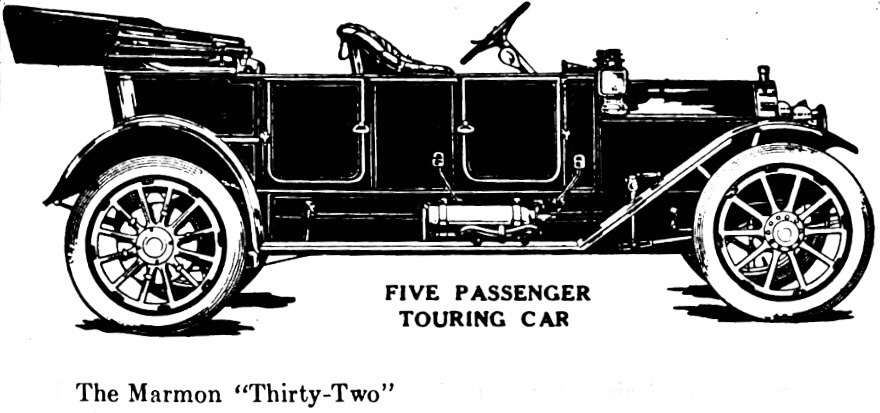
Marmon Model 32 (1909–1914)

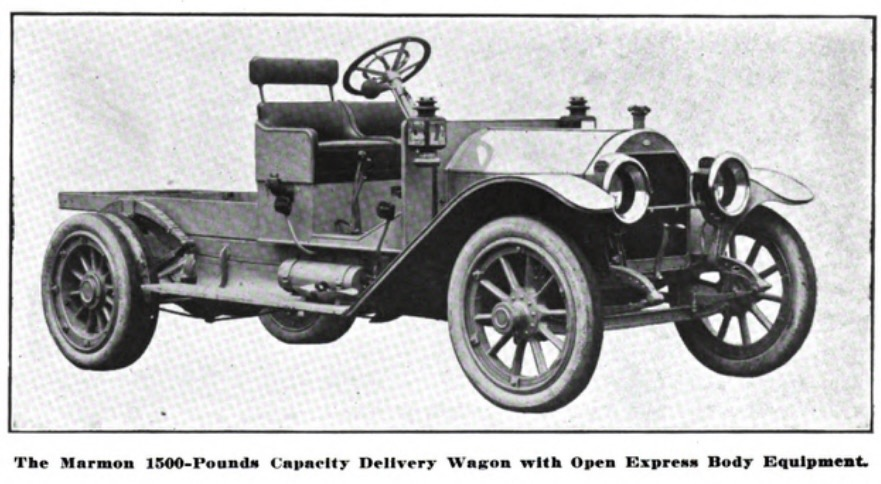
Marmon Truck (1913)

Marmon Motor Car Company was an American luxury automobile manufacturer founded by Howard Carpenter Marmon and owned by Nordyke Marmon & Company of Indianapolis, Indiana, U.S., and active from 1902 to 1933.

It was established in 1902 but not incorporated as the successor of Nordyke Marmon & Company until 1926. In 1933 it was succeeded by Marmon-Herrington, and in 1964 the Marmon brand name was sold to the Marmon Motor Company of Denton, Texas. Marmon-Herrington became the Marmon Group of Chicago, in 1964.

Marmon was notable for its various pioneering works in automotive manufacturing, introducing the rear-view mirror, pioneering the V16 engine, and the use of aluminum in auto manufacturing. The historic open wheel Marmon Wasp race car of the early 20th century was the first to use a single-seater "monoposto" construction layout.

== Marmon Automobiles ==
Marmon's parent company was founded in 1851, manufacturing flour grinding mill equipment and branching out into other machinery through the late 19th century. Small limited production of experimental automobiles began in 1902, with an air-cooled V-twin engine. An air-cooled V4 followed the next year, with pioneering V6 and V8 engines tried over the next few years, before more conventional straight engine designs were settled upon. Marmons soon gained a reputation as reliable, speedy upscale cars.

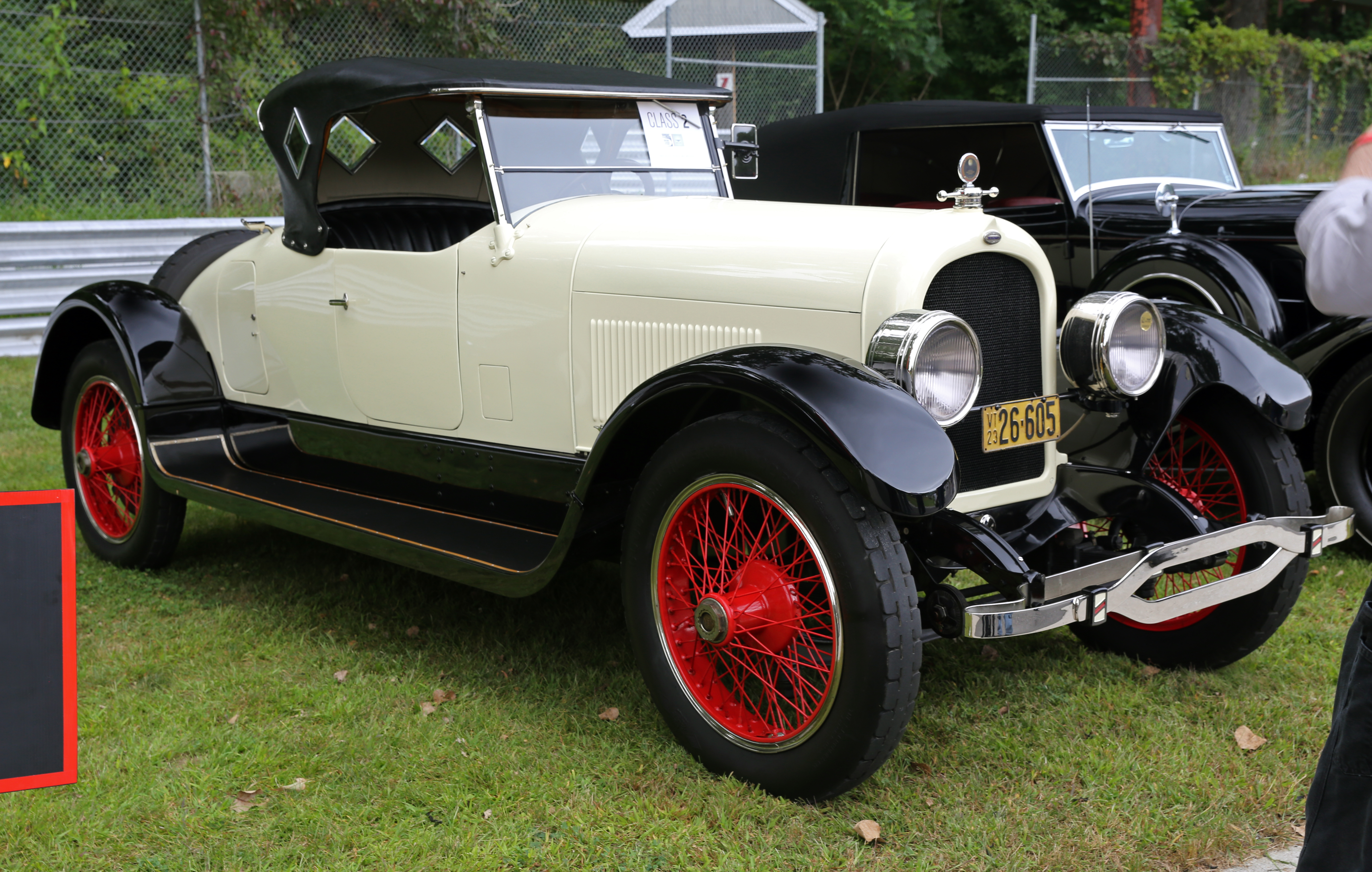
Late (1923) Marmon 34B 2-passenger speedster

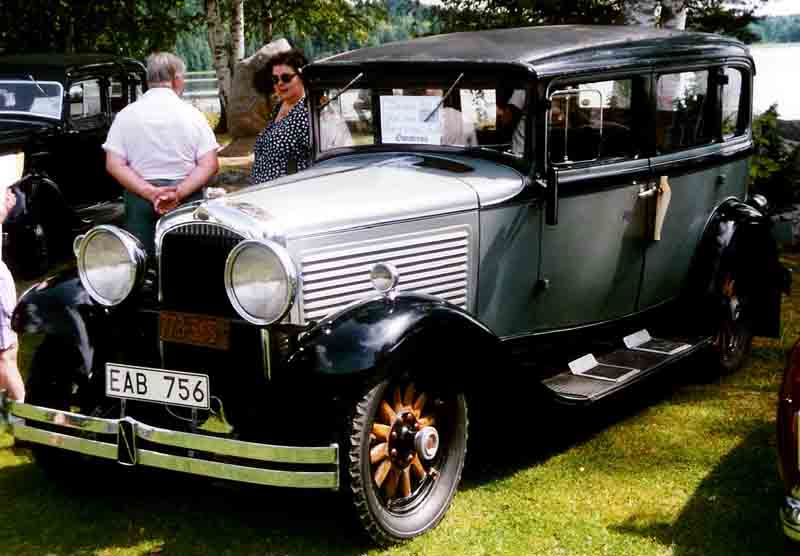
Marmon Series 8-69 4-door sedan 1929

=== Model 32 ===
The Model 32 of 1909 spawned the Wasp. It was driven by Marmon engineer and former racer Ray Harroun (who came out of retirement as a driver for just one race) to the championship of the first ever Indianapolis 500 motor race, in 1911. This car debuted the first known automobile rear-view mirror.

=== Model 41 ===
Model 41

=== Model 48 ===
The 1913 Model 48 was a left-hand steering tourer with a cast aluminum engine and electric headlights and horn, as well as electric courtesy lights for the dash and doors. It used a 573 in^{3} (9,382 cc) (4½×6-inch, 114×152 mm) T-head straight-six engine of between 48 and 80 hp (36 and 60 kW) with dual-plug ignition and electric starter. It had a 145 in (3683 mm) wheelbase (long for the era) and 36×4½-inch (91×11.4 cm) front/37×5-inch (94×12.7 cm) rear wheels (which interchanged front and rear) and full-elliptic front and ¾-elliptic rear springs. Like most cars of the era, it came complete with a tool kit; in Marmon's case, it offered jack, power tire pump, chassis oiler, tire patch kit, and trouble light. The 48 came in a variety of models: two-, four-, five-, and seven-passenger tourers at US$5,000 ($162,879 in 2025 dollars), seven-passenger limousine at US$6,250 ($203,598 in 2025 dollars), seven-passenger landaulette at US$6,350 ($206,856 in 2025 dollars), and seven-passenger Berlin limousine at US$6,450 ($210,114 in 2025 dollars).

=== Model 34 ===
The 1916 Model 34 used an aluminum straight-six, and used aluminum in the body and chassis to reduce overall weight to just 3295 lb (1495 kg). The displacement of the six-cylinder engine is 5565 cc with a bore of 95.25 mm and a stroke of 130.175 mm. A Model 34 was driven coast to coast as a publicity stunt, beating Erwin "Cannonball" Baker's record to much fanfare. By the year 1920, over 11,000 Marmon 34 had already been produced. The wheelbase was 136 inches = 3454 mm. The fuel tank held 18 gallons = 68 liters. The Electric System operates at 6 V and the storage batterie had a capacity of 162 Ah.

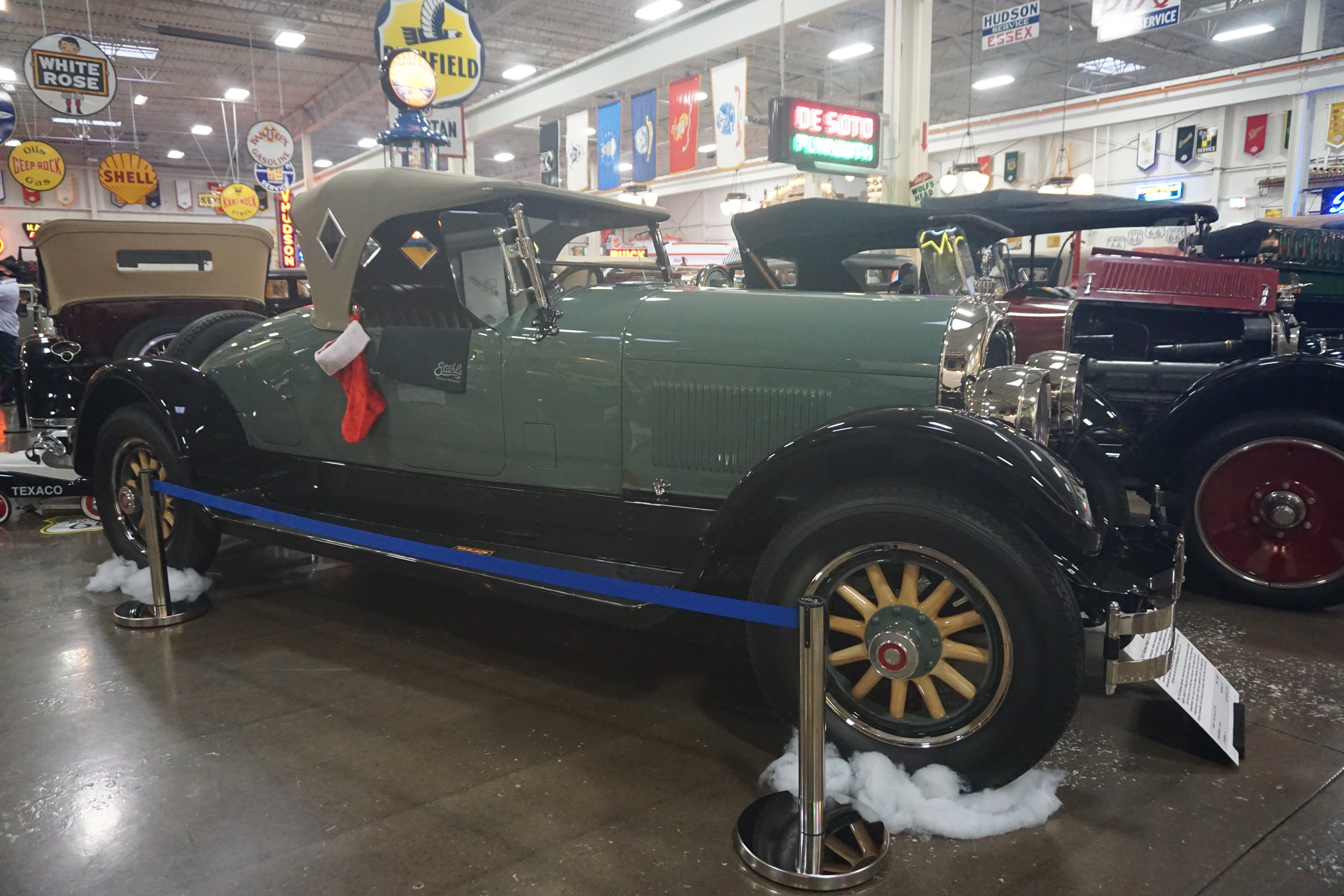
1924 Marmon Model 34-C Two-Passenger Speedster

New models were introduced for 1924, replacing the long-lived Model 34, but the company was facing financial trouble, and in 1926 was reorganized as the Marmon Motor Car Co.

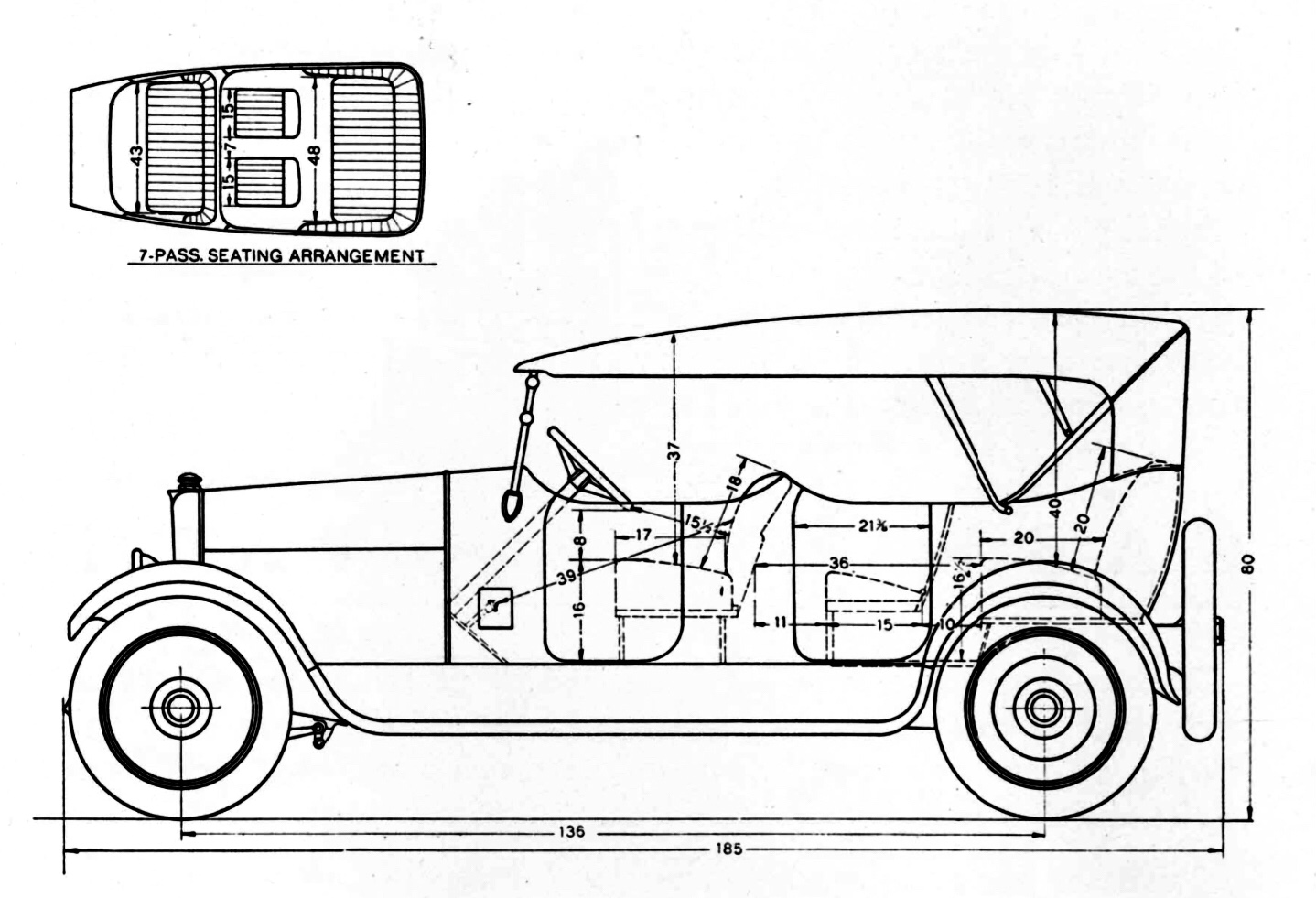
Marmon 34 Seven passenger Touring car

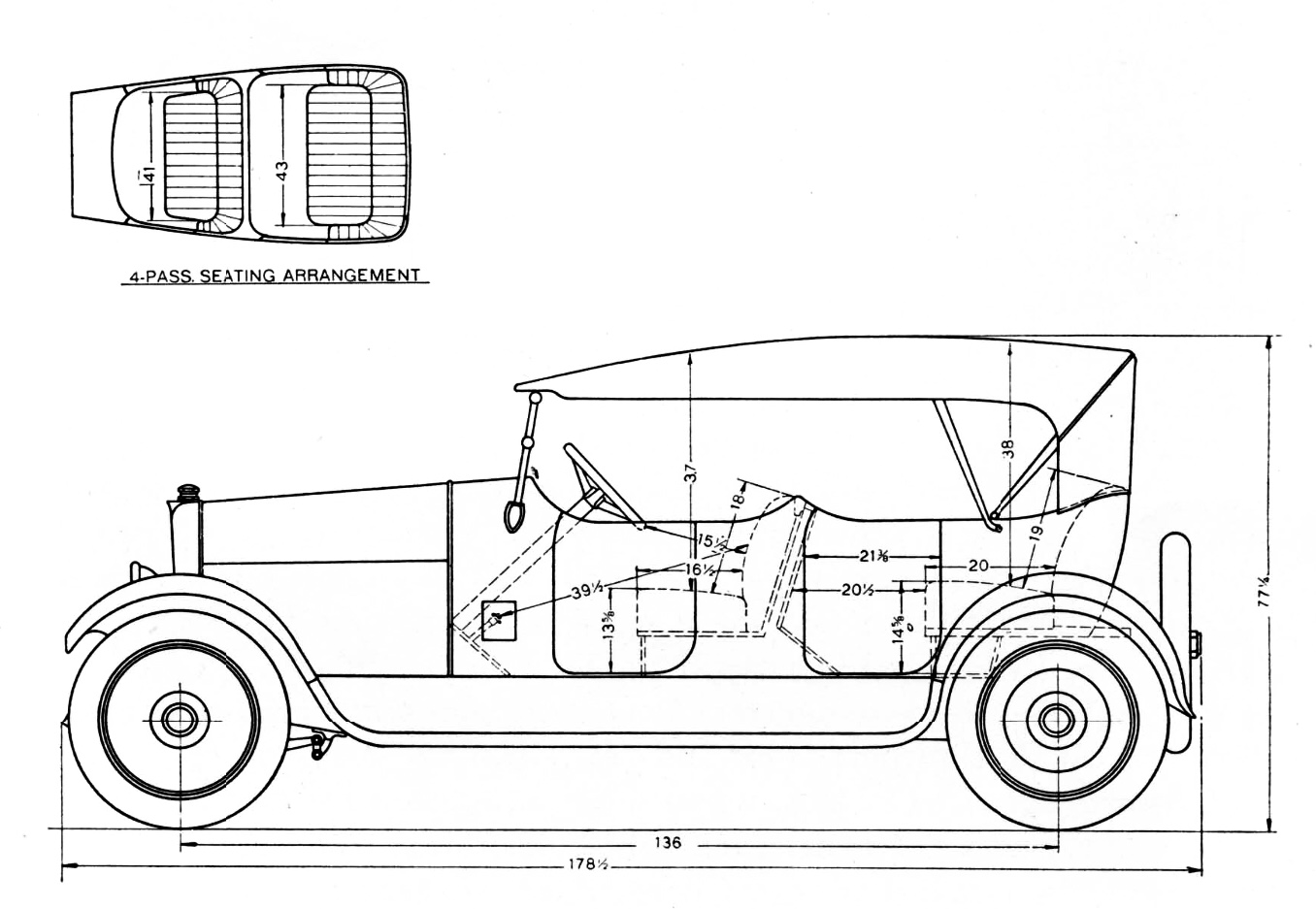
Marmon 34 Four passenger Touring car

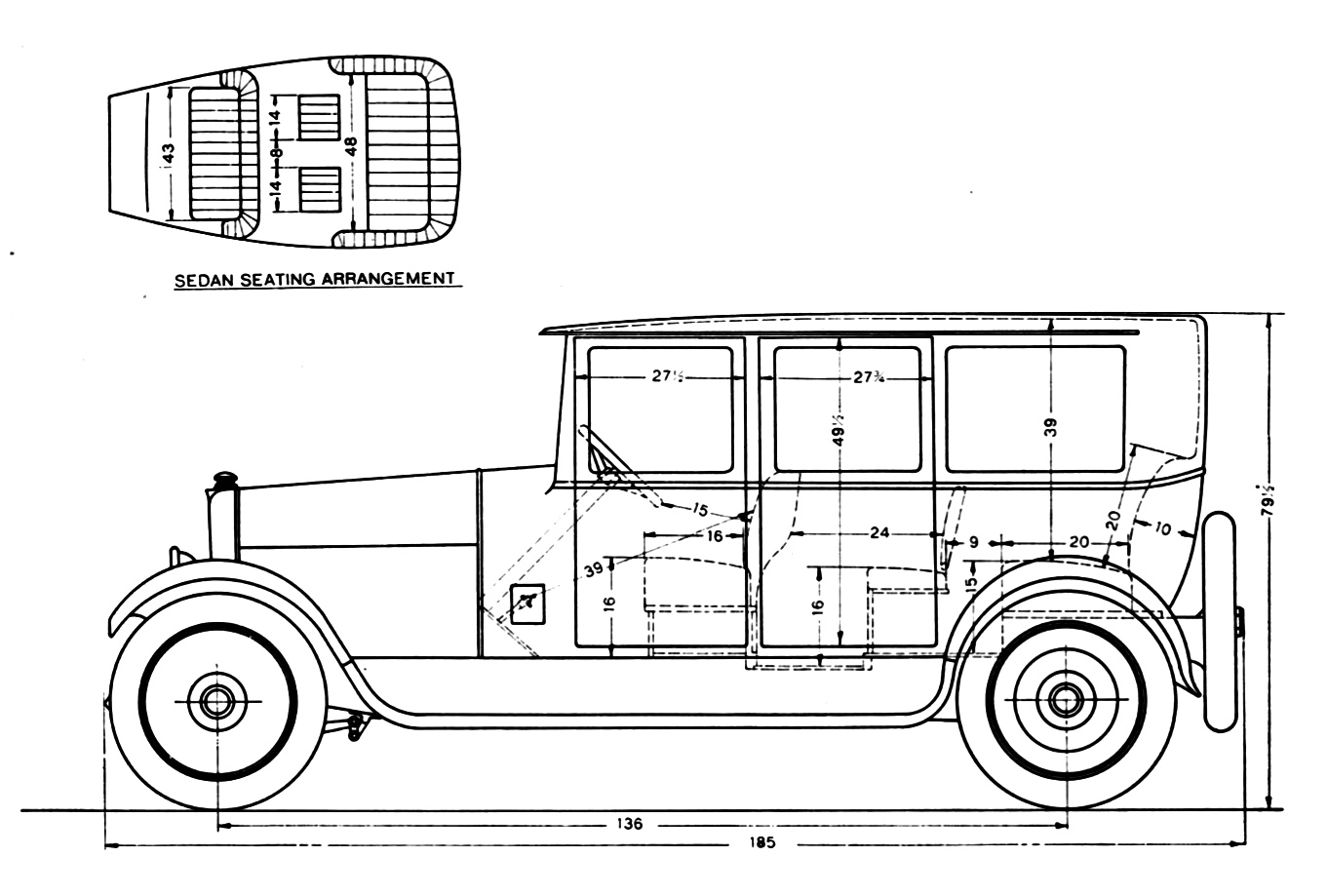
Marmon 34 Seven passenger Sedan

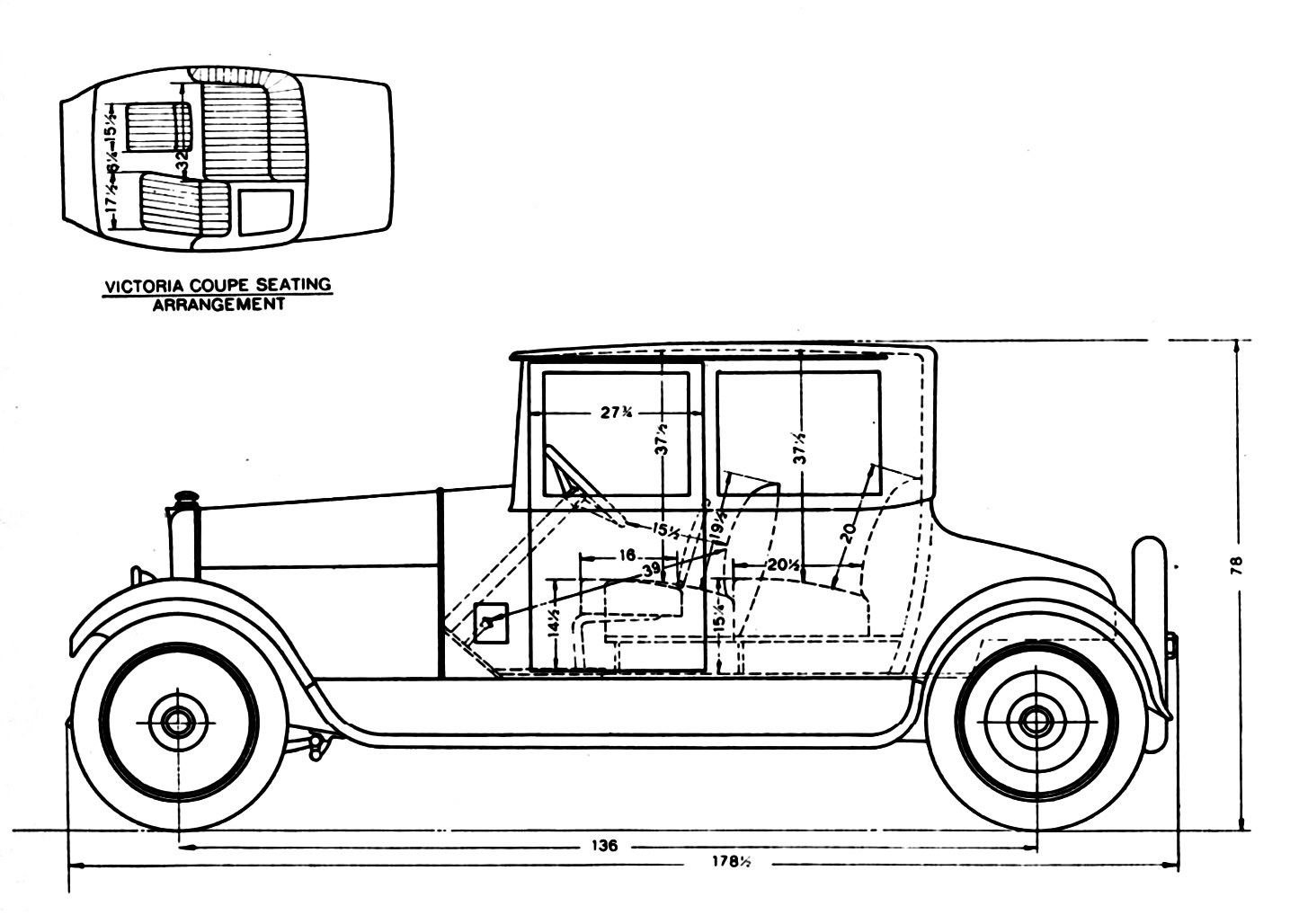
Marmon 34 Four passenger Victoria Coupé

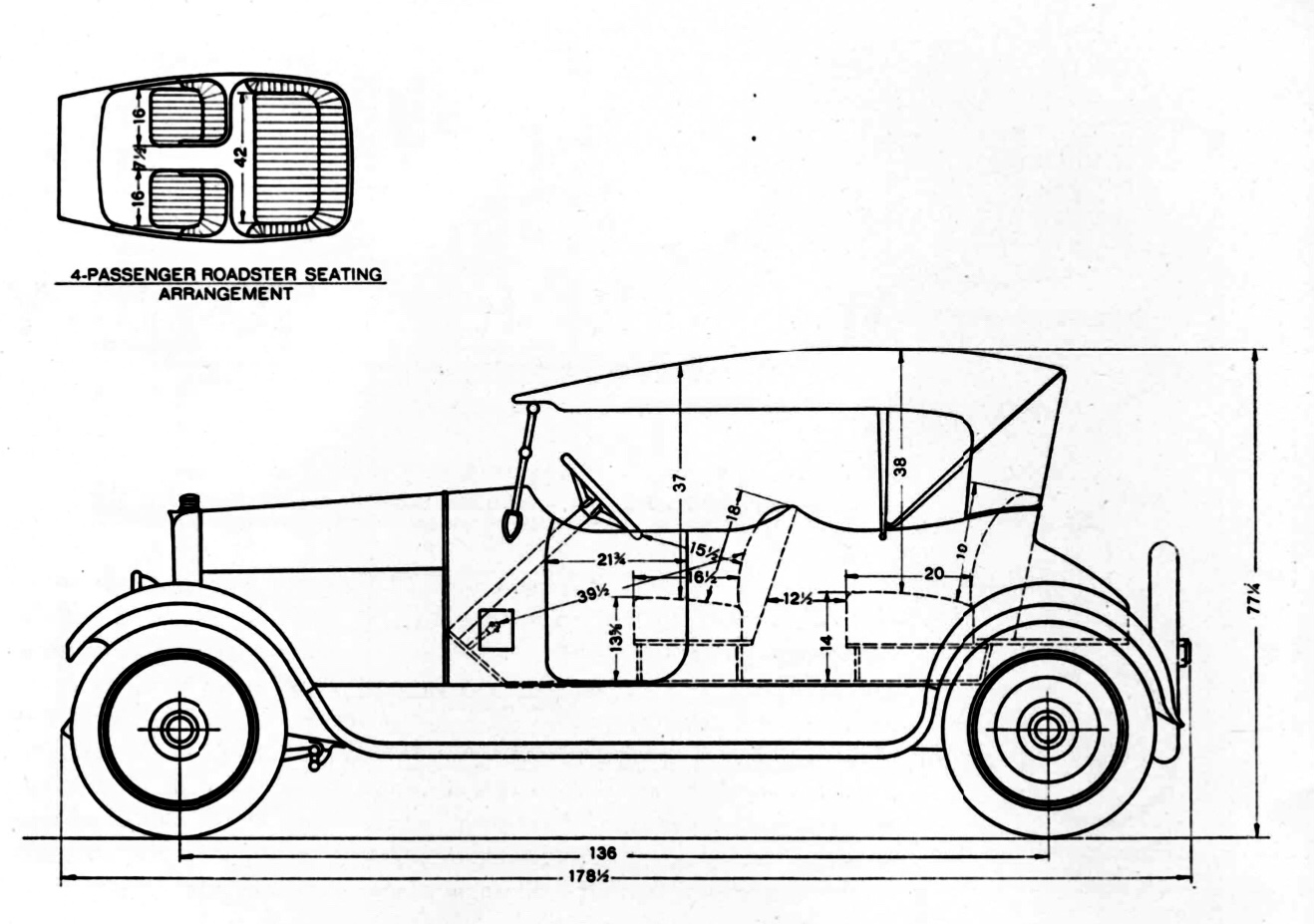
Marmon 34 Four passenger Roadster two door

=== Little Marmon, Roosevelt ===
In 1927 the Little Marmon series was introduced and in 1929, Marmon introduced an under-$1,000 straight-eight car, the Roosevelt, but the stock market crash of 1929 made the company's problems worse.

=== Marmon Sixteen ===
The Marmon Sixteen was produced between 1931 and 1934. Howard Marmon had begun working on the world's first V16 engine in 1927. By the time the Sixteen was introduced Cadillac had already debuted their V-16, designed by ex-Marmon engineer Owen Nacker. Peerless, too, had been developing a V16 with help from an ex-Marmon engineer, James Bohannon.

The Sixteen's engine displaced 491 in^{3} (8.0 L) and produced 200 hp (149 kW). It was an all-aluminum design with steel cylinder liners and a 45° bank angle. The car's body was designed by Walter Dorwin Teague in 1930, with assistance from his son.

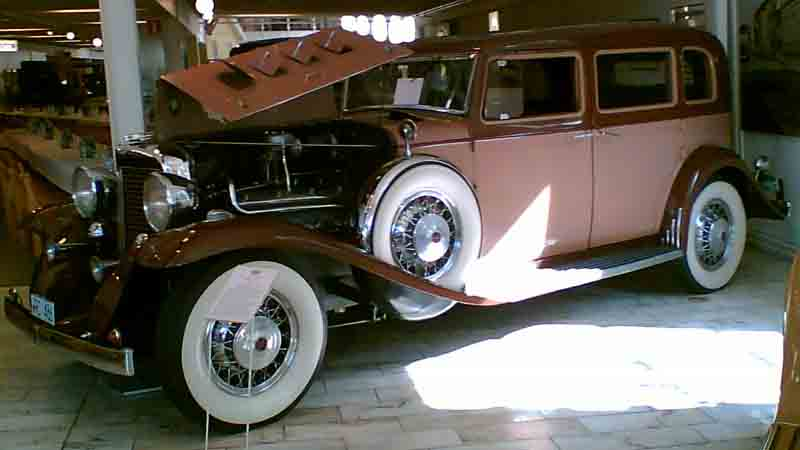
Marmon Series 16 4-door sedan 1933

=== Manufacturing Plant ===
The original Nordyke & Marmon Plant 1 was at the southwest corner of Kentucky Avenue and West Morris Street. Plant 2 was at the southwest corner of Drover and West York Street. Plant 3 was a five-story structure measuring 80 x 600 feet parallel to Morris Street (now Eli Lilly & Company Building 314). The Marmon assembly plant was built adjacent to the Morris Street property line with Plant 3 behind and parallel to it (also part of the Eli Lilly complex).

== Marmon-Herrington ==
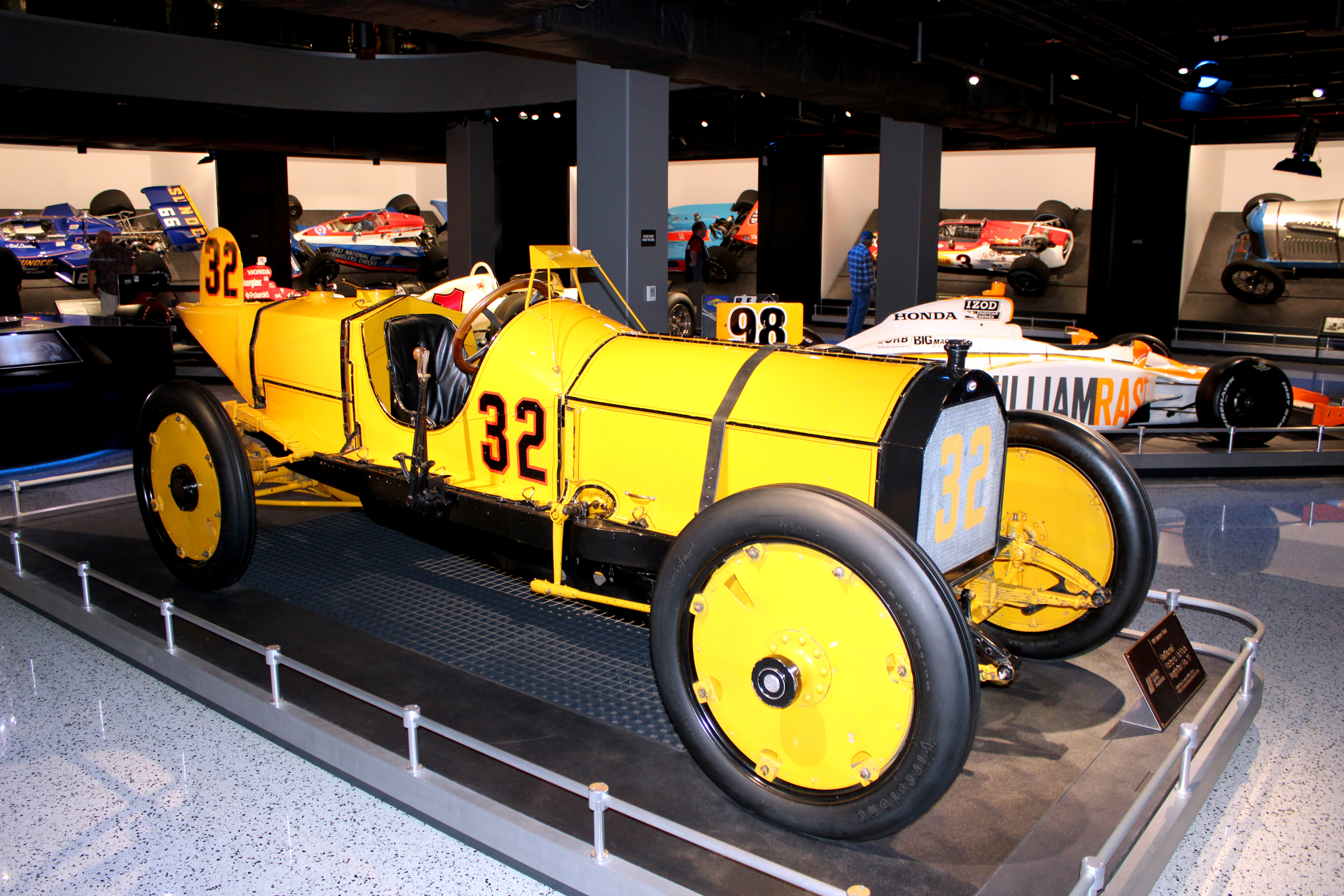
Ray Harroun's Wasp, winner of the 1911 Indianapolis 500. The car's rear-view mirror is mounted on struts ahead of the steering wheel.

While the Marmon Company discontinued auto production, it continued to manufacture components for other auto manufacturers and manufactured trucks. When the Great Depression drastically reduced the luxury car market, the Marmon Car Company joined forces with Colonel Arthur Herrington, an ex-military engineer involved in the design of all-wheel drive vehicles. The new company was called Marmon-Herrington.

In the early 1960s, Marmon-Herrington was purchased by the Pritzker family and became a member of an association of companies which eventually adopted the name The Marmon Group. In 2007, the Pritzker family sold a major part of the Group to Warren Buffett's firm Berkshire Hathaway.

For the 1993 Indianapolis 500, to commemorate the 40th anniversary of The Marmon Group of companies, Éric Bachelart drove a tribute to the Marmon Wasp, actually a year old Lola with Buick power, which was uncompetitive and failed to qualify. After qualifications ended, the sponsorship was transferred to the car of John Andretti, who was driving for A. J. Foyt Enterprises. Andretti started 23rd and briefly led before eventually finishing tenth.

== Notable owners ==
Actor Francis X. Bushman, at the height of his movie fame in the 1910s, owned a custom built purple painted Marmon. Other actors who were owners of Marmons include Wallace Reid, Douglas Fairbanks and Arthur Tracy.

Statesman and national hero of Finland Carl Gustaf Emil Mannerheim's official car was a Marmon E-75. Much later, the same car was bought by a group of technology students. It is still the representational car of the Aalto University student union after considerable repairs, and the name Marmon, to some extent, is coupled to this specific vehicle.

J. Horace McFarland, president of the American Civic Association, owned a Marmon. In 1924, he wrote to John Gries of the National Bureau of Standards' Division of Building and Housing that his Marmon cost nine cents a mile to operate, "independent of the chauffeur."

In his memoir, "The Cruise of the Rolling Junk", F. Scott Fitzgerald wrote about a 1,200-mile automobile trip to the South that he and Zelda Fitzgerald took in their used 1918 Marmon Speedster.

In his novella "Murder is My Business" and in other stories collected from the late 1930s, Raymond Chandler's detective hero, Philip Marlowe, drives an "old Marmon" throughout his investigations in old Los Angeles.

In 1916–17, Ruby Archambeau of Portland, Oregon, became the first woman to drive the circumference of the United States. Her vehicle was a Marmon.

"King of Bootleggers" Italian Canadian Rocco Perri of Hamilton, Ontario, was known to favor Marmons in the 1920s.

Actress Bebe Daniels was driving a Marmon Roadster 72 miles per hour south of Santa Ana when she became the first woman to be convicted of speeding in Orange County.

Operatic soprano Anna Case is pictured with her "High Power Marmon" in the May 8, 1924 issue of trade publication Musical Courier.

== Advertisements ==
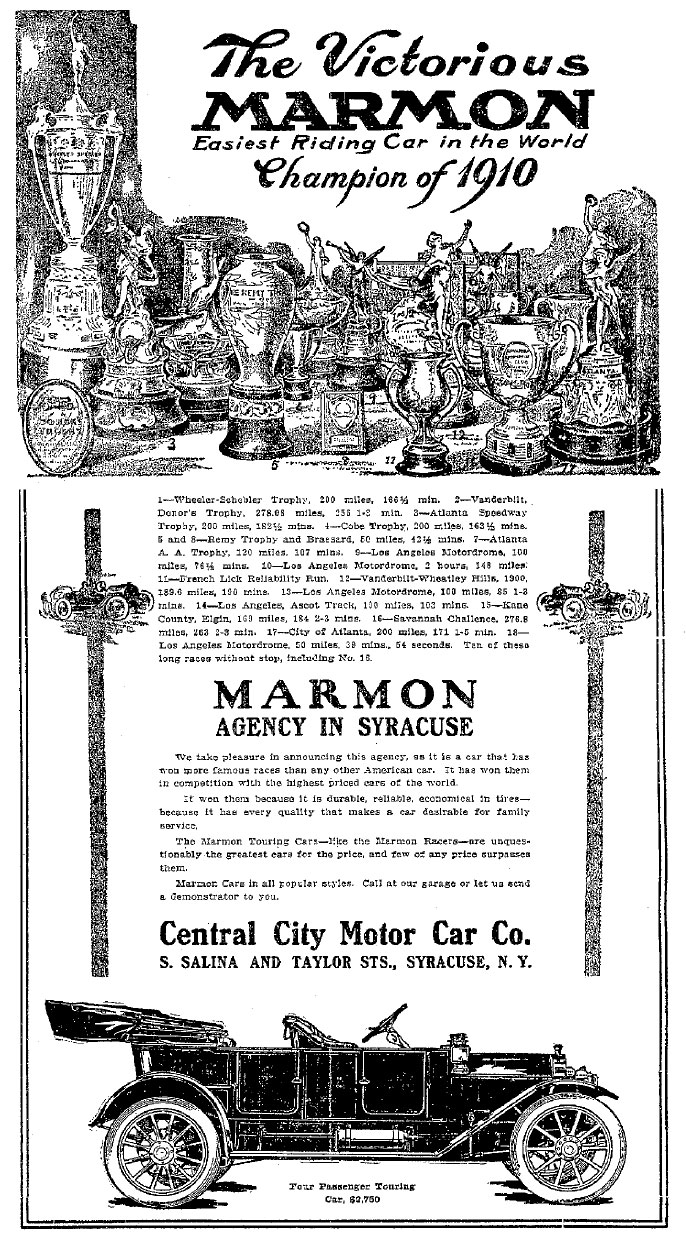
A 1911 Marmon Advertisement - Syracuse Post-Standard, March 18, 1911

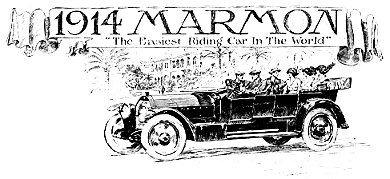
Marmon "48" from 1914 ad

== See also ==
- List of automobile manufacturers
