= Blanche Stillson =

American artist and author

- Born: June 6, 1889; Indianapolis, Indiana, Marion County, Indiana, United States
- Died: January 4, 1977 (aged 87); Indianapolis, Indiana, United States
- Occupations: Artist, author, and art educator
- Known for: Wood-block prints
- Parent(s): Dr. Joseph O. Stillson; Matilda Rose (Bisch) Stillson

Blanche Stillson (June 6, 1889 – January 4, 1977) was an American artist and author from Indianapolis. She began her career as a painter, and later moved to wood-block printing.

== Early life and education ==
Blance Stillson was born on June 6, 1889, in Indianapolis, Indiana, to Mathilde Rose (Bisch) and Dr. Joseph O. Stillson. Joseph Stillson and Matilda Bisch married on October 27, 1880. In the late 1800s Doctor Joseph O. Stillson, attended Hanover College, practiced medicine in Bedford, Indiana, with his father, Dr. Joseph Stillson.

Stillson attended the Girls' Classical School in Indianapolis, a college preparatory school founded by May Wright Sewall and her husband, Theodore Lovett Sewall. Stillson also attended DePauw University in Greencastle, Indiana, where she joined Alpha Phi, and international women's fraternity. She graduated with bachelor's degree from DePauw in 1911, the same year she was selected as a Phi Beta Kappa member.

Stillson also attended John Herron Art Institute in Indianapolis, where her art teachers were William Forsyth and J. Ottis Adams. During several summers she also studied with Charles Webster Hawthorne in Provincetown, Massachusetts. Stillson trained as a painter and did not began wood-block printing until the age of thirty-one.

== Career ==
=== Artist and art educator ===
Stillson taught art and painting from 1920 to 1934 at John Herron Art Institute (a forerunner to the Herron School of Art and Design at Indiana University–Purdue University at Indianapolis and the Indianapolis Museum of Art, present-day Newfields). She also taught art at Shortridge High School from 1928 to 1939 and Butler University in the evenings beginning in 1933.

Stillson exhibited her paintings and woodcuts at numerous art shows, including the Hoosier Salon's annual shows from 1925 to 1928 and at the Indiana State Fair from 1920 to 1927. Her art also appeared in books and newspapers, and on bookplates, greeting cards, promotional materials.

=== Author ===
Stillson wrote a weekly art column for the Indianapolis News from 1923 to 1925. She also wrote magazine articles, including "On Block Prints," an essay that was published in the Alpha Phi Quarterly in June 1922.

She was the author of three books. Abe Martin––Kin Hubbard (Indianapolis, 1939), which she co-authored with Dorothy R. Russo, describes Frank "Kin" McKinney Hubbard and Abe Martin, the cartoon character he created. The Marmon Memorial Collection of Paintings (Indianapolis, 1948), describes the modern art that Caroline Marmon Fesler acquired and donated to the Art Association of Indianapolis (Indianapolis Museum of Art). Wings: Insects, Birds, Men (Indianapolis, 1954) which gained national attention from the Book of the Month Club, is her most well-known work. Stillson, an avid bird watcher, provides a detailed account of the evolution of flight. In a book review published in the American Museum of Natural History's magazine, Natural History, E. T. Gilliard described Wings as "a classic" and compared it to Rachel Carson's The Sea Around Us, explaining that Stillson's book "does for the air around us what Rachel Carson has done for the sea."

=== Cultural leader ===
Stillson was active in the Indianapolis arts community. She was elected a trustee of the Art Association of Indianapolis, the present-day Indianapolis Museum of Art (Newfields) in 1944. She was also a member of the IMA's board of directors and served as vice president of the board in 1959.

== Personal life ==
Throughout her life, Stillson resided at a home that her parents had built in 1908 on North Meridian Street.

== Death and legacy ==
Stillson died on January 4, 1977, at Methodist Hospital in Indianapolis. Her remains are interred at Indianapolis's Crown Hill Cemetery.

Stillson produced art in several mediums, including still-life paintings, but she is best known for her wood-block prints, especially her bookplates. Examples of Stillson's art are included in the permanent collections of the Indianapolis Museum of Art (Newfields) in Indianapolis, and in the collections of the William Henry Smith Memorial Library at the Indiana Historical Society in Indianapolis.
