= Daniel W. Marmon =

American industrialist (1844–1909)

Daniel W. Marmon (October 10, 1844 – May 10, 1909) was an American industrialist.

== Biography ==
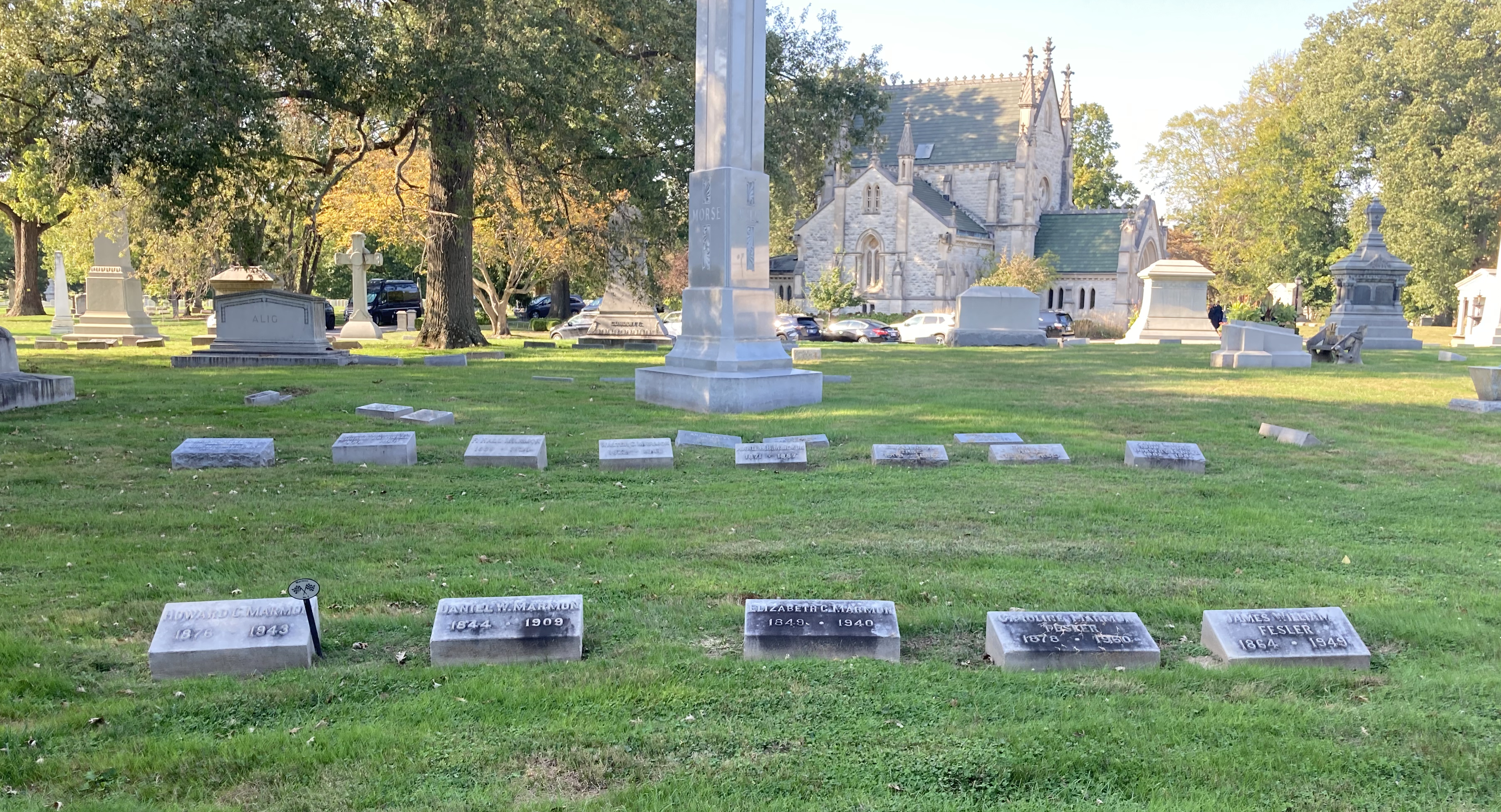
Marmon's grave (front row, second from left) at Crown Hill Cemetery

Born in Logan County, Ohio, Marmon was orphaned at age five and raised by his industrialist uncle, Eli Stubbs. As a child, he spent a great deal of time visiting the E. & A. H. Nordyke plant, a maker of milling equipment.

In 1865, after his graduation from Earlham College, Marmon become an equal partner in the mill construction business, and the company was renamed Nordyke Marmon & Company. It became most notable for its automobiles.

In 1882, Marmon and his wife Elizabeth purchased their property at 1100 East Shore Drive on Lake Maxinkuckee's East Shore. It contained a small cottage and over time, the cottage was expanded and outbuildings constructed.

Marmon and Elizabeth had two sons, Walter and businessman Howard.

Marmon died on May 10, 1909, in Indianapolis, from arteriosclerosis, and was buried at Crown Hill Cemetery.
