= Why Born Enslaved! =

Sculpture by Jean-Baptiste Carpeaux

Why Born Enslaved?
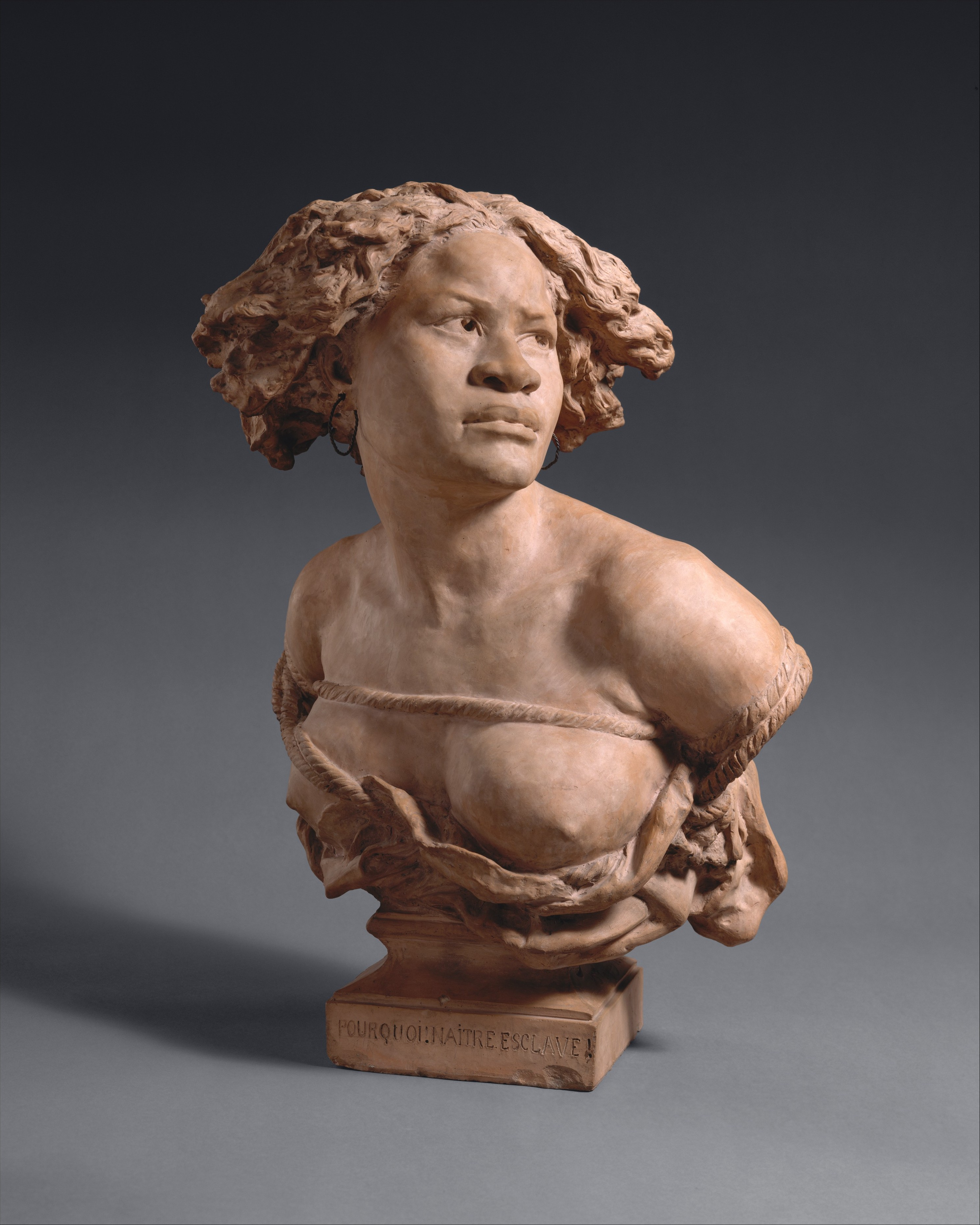
- Artist: Jean-Baptiste Carpeaux
- Year: 1867 (1868, 1869, 1873)
- Subject: Abolitionism
- Location: Cleveland Museum of Art, Metropolitan Museum of Art, National Museum in Warsaw, Ny Carlsberg Glyptotek, Petit Palais

Why Born Enslaved! (in French: Pourquoi naître esclave?) is a life-sized bust by the French sculptor Jean-Baptiste Carpeaux depicting a bound woman of African descent. Carpeaux executed versions of the sculpture in plaster, marble, terracotta, and bronze. It is represented in a number of museums, including the Ny Carlsberg Glyptotek in Copenhagen (marble, 1869) and the Metropolitan Museum of Art in New York City (marble, 1873).

== History ==
While the composition, modeled in 1868, debuted at the Paris Salon in 1869 and was reproduced in various media, the marble version was carved in 1873. Carpeaux added the inscription in French, Pourquoi! naître esclave! (lit. 'For what! to be born a slave'). The work was a preparatory work for the commission he had for the Fontaine de l'Observatoire, a fountain in the Jardin Marco Polo, south of the Jardin du Luxembourg in the 6th arrondissement of Paris.

Carpeaux explored the theme of slavery in his artwork after abolition in France in 1848 and the end of the American Civil War in 1865.

== Versions ==
- An 1867 polychromed plaster version, used as a master to cast other bronze versions of the bust, was acquired by the Cleveland Museum of Art in 2022.
- 1868 bronze versions are in the permanent collections of the Indianapolis Museum of Art, the National Museum in Warsaw, and the Museum of Fine Arts, Houston.
- An 1869 marble version of the bust is in the collection of the Ny Carlsberg Glyptotek (MIN 1671) in Copenhagen. In 1911 it was acquired by the Carlsberg Foundation from Eugène Plantié in Caen and presented to the museum.
- The Metropolitan Museum of Art in New York owns a terracotta version (1872) and a marble version (1873).
- Another version is in the City of Paris Museum of Fine Arts.
- An 1868 plaster version is in the collection of the Brooklyn Museum.

== Derivatives ==
Why Born Enslaved is the basis for Kara Walker's 2017 statue Negress, which is a plaster cast made from the bust where the bust's face forms a void within it.

== See also ==
- Fontaine de l'Observatoire
