= Fontaine de l'Observatoire =

Fountain in Paris, France

Coordinates: 48°50′27.8″N 2°20′12.5″E

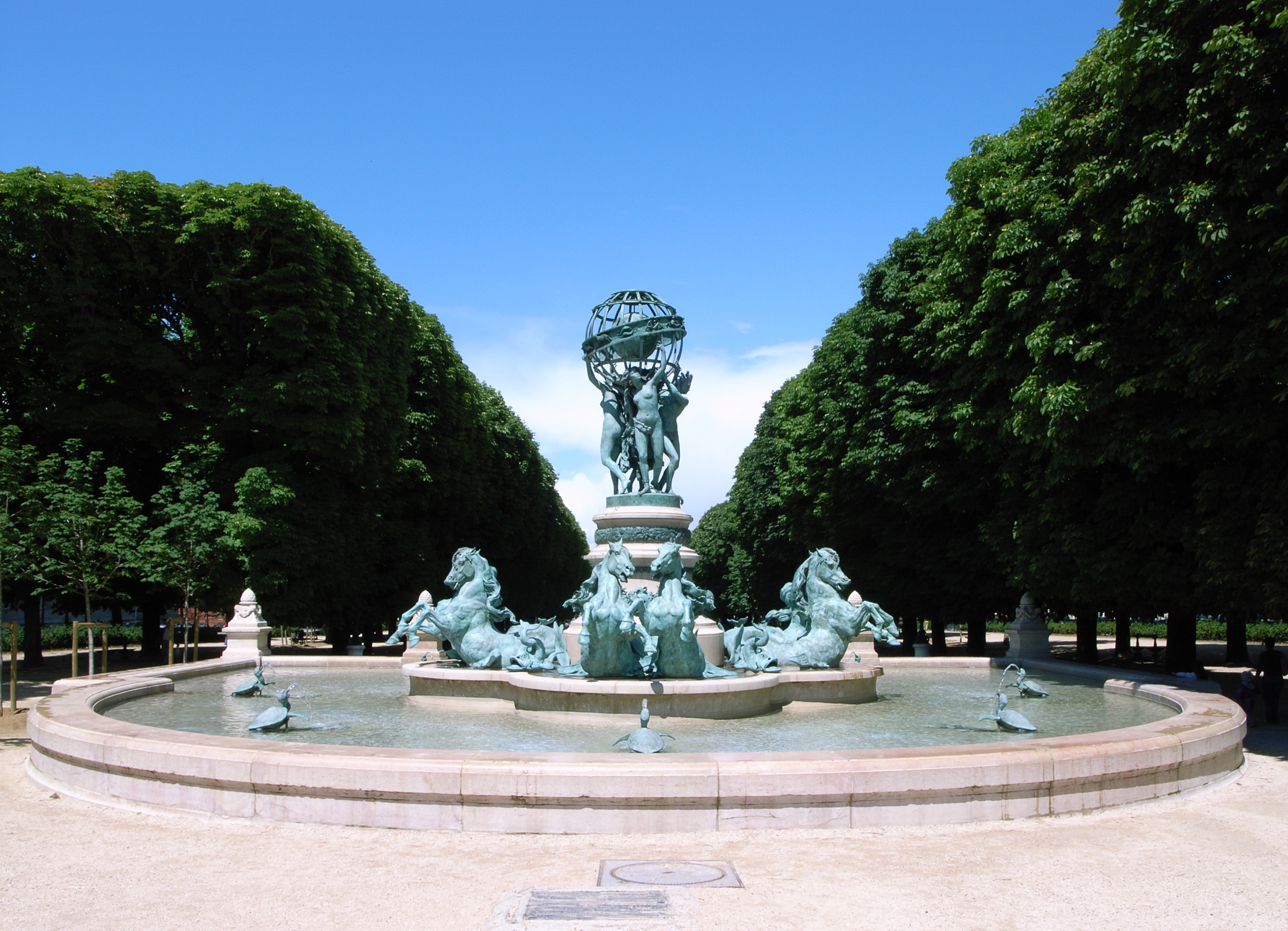
The Fontaine de l'Observatoire (1867-1874)

The Fontaine de l'Observatoire is a monumental fountain located in the Jardin Marco Polo, south of the Jardin du Luxembourg in the 6th arrondissement of Paris, with sculpture by Jean-Baptiste Carpeaux. It was dedicated in 1874. It is also known as the Fontaine des Quatre-Parties-du-Monde, for the four parts of the world embodied by its female figures, or simply the Fontaine Carpeaux.

== History ==
The fountain was first proposed in 1866 as part of the creation of the new grand avenue du Luxembourg, one of the major projects of the plan of Baron Haussmann for the reconstruction of Paris. The project was under the direction of Gabriel Davioud, the director of the Service of Parks and Plantations of the Prefecture of Paris. Davioud was a trained classical sculptor, and he was responsible for the design of the Paris fountains, squares, gates, lamp-posts, benches, pavilions and other architectural details during the Second French Empire.

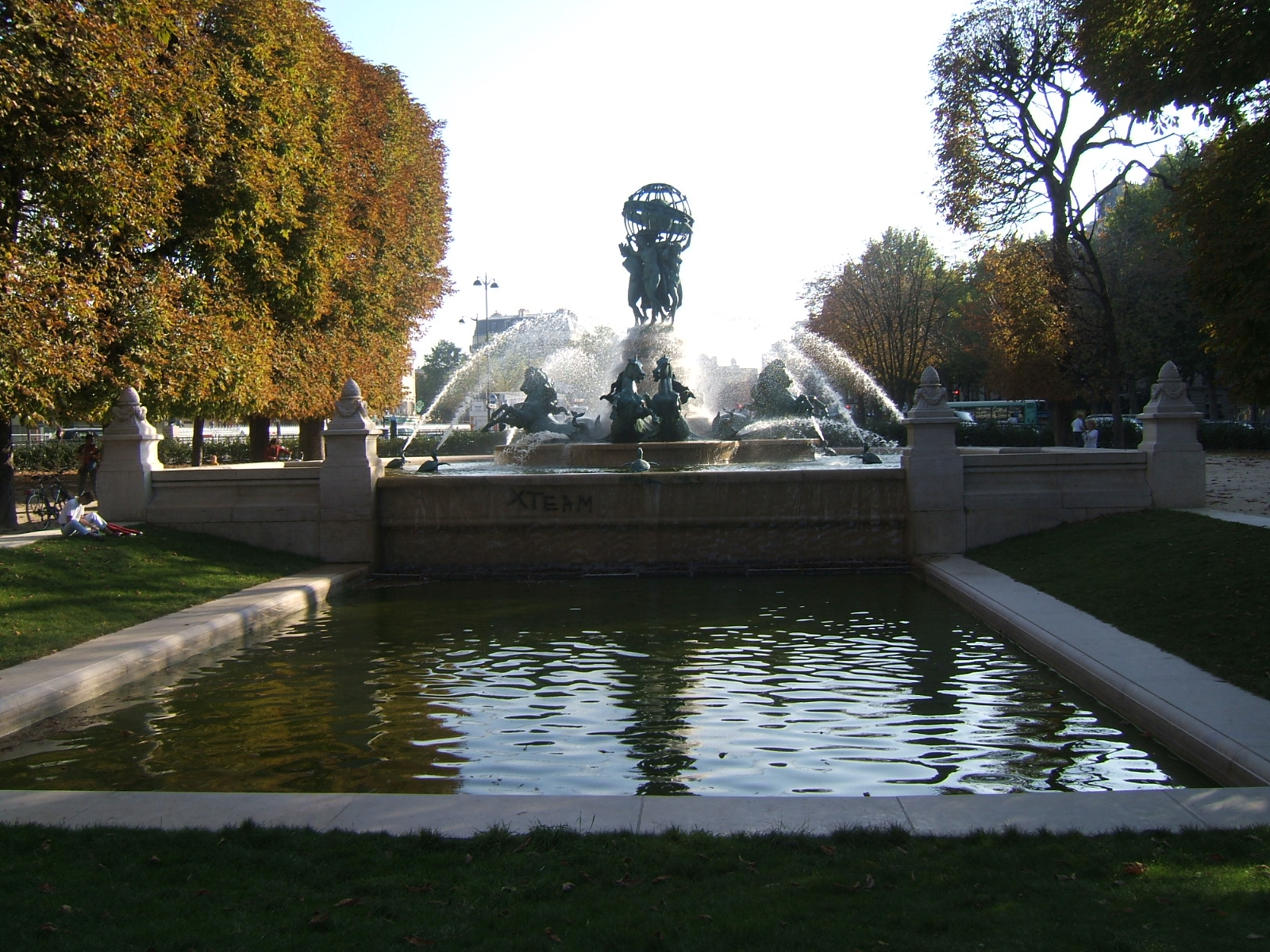
Ensemble setting

The avenue du Luxembourg project called for the creation of two new squares, with ornamental lamps and columns, statues, and a fountain. The fountain was located on the tree-lined axis between the Observatoire de Paris and the Palais du Luxembourg. The sculpture of the fountain was supposed to be related to the observatory, and instructions of Davioud to the sculptor were simply not to block the view of the domed observatory or the palace.

The sculptor chosen, Jean-Baptiste Carpeaux (1827–1875), had been a pupil of François Rude, the sculptor who had made the most famous group of sculptures on the Arc de Triomphe. Carpeaux won the Prix de Rome in 1854. In 1869 he made the sculptures of La Danse on the facade of the Paris Opera which had caused a scandal because of the free expression of the sculpture and the unrestrained emotions on the faces of the statues, much different from the calm expressions of neo-classical statues. The first critical reaction to the sculpture, based on the plaster models presented in the Salon, was hostile. The critic Jules Clarétie wrote: "These thin, unhealthy women, with their wasted flanks, their elongated, furrowed thighs, are twisting around in a bizarre circle without any grace.... One has to ask by what aberration of spirit, eye and hand one could compose such a group of wild, vulgar and wrinkled dancers."

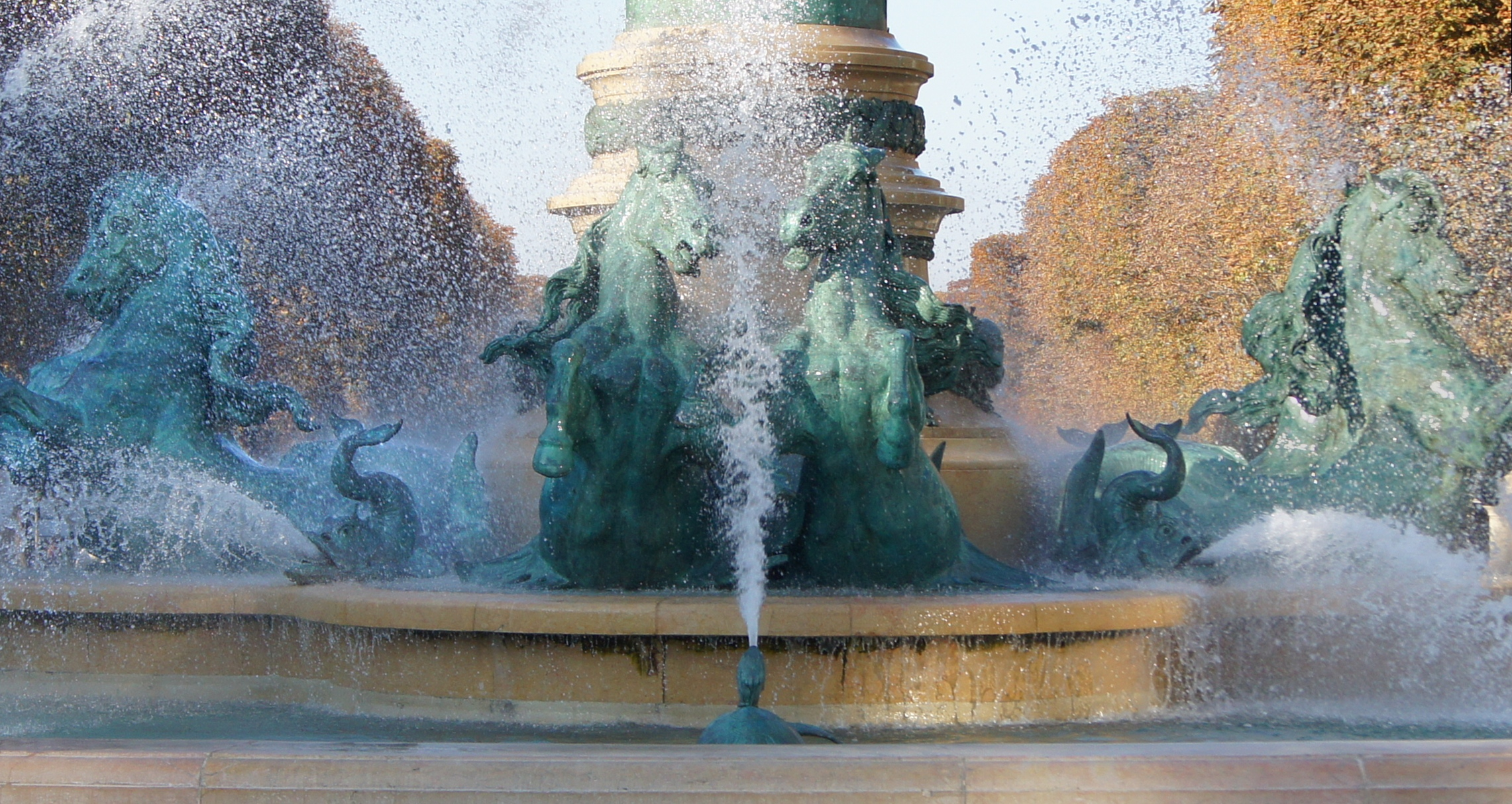
Emmanuel Frémiet's horses

The first studies Carpeaux made were of four standing female figures representing the four points of the compass holding a celestial sphere over their heads, but Carpeaux was dissatisfied with the immobility of the figures. In his next models he transformed the women into representatives of the four parts of the world, Europe, Asia, Africa and America, twisting their bodies to turn the sphere, giving the sculpture motion. The sculptor Eugène Legrain (1837–1915), a student of Carpeaux, was commissioned to make the sphere, and the sculptor Emmanuel Frémiet, the nephew and pupil of the sculptor François Rude, made the horses in the basin around the statue. Louis Villeminot created the garlands of seashells and aquatic plants which decorated the basin, and Legrain designed the zodiac band around the sphere. The project received one correction from the Director of the Observatory, who noted in 1872 that the signs of the zodiac on the band around the equator of the sphere should actually be on an ecliptic circle.

Views of the original plaster, now on display at the Musée d'Orsay
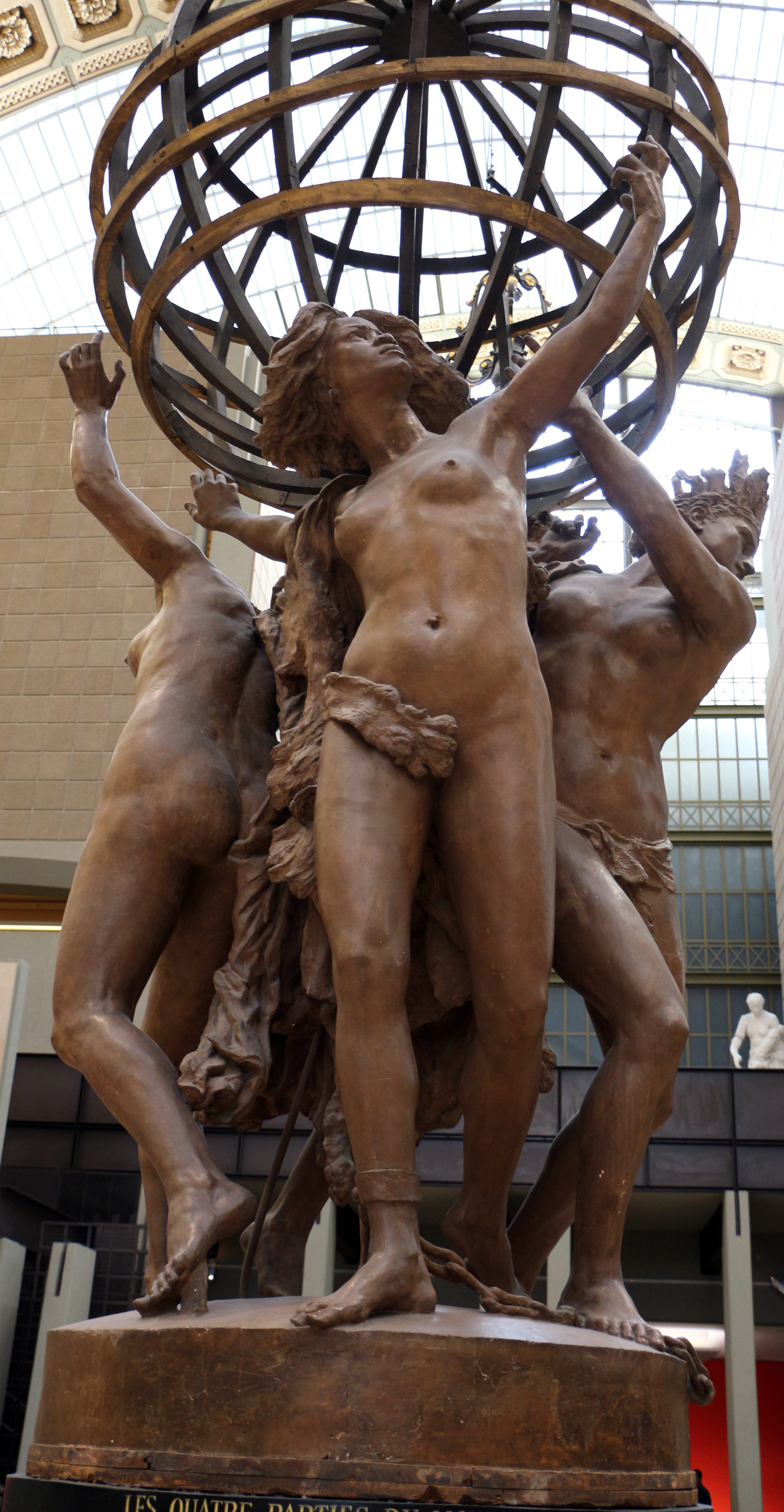
Africa

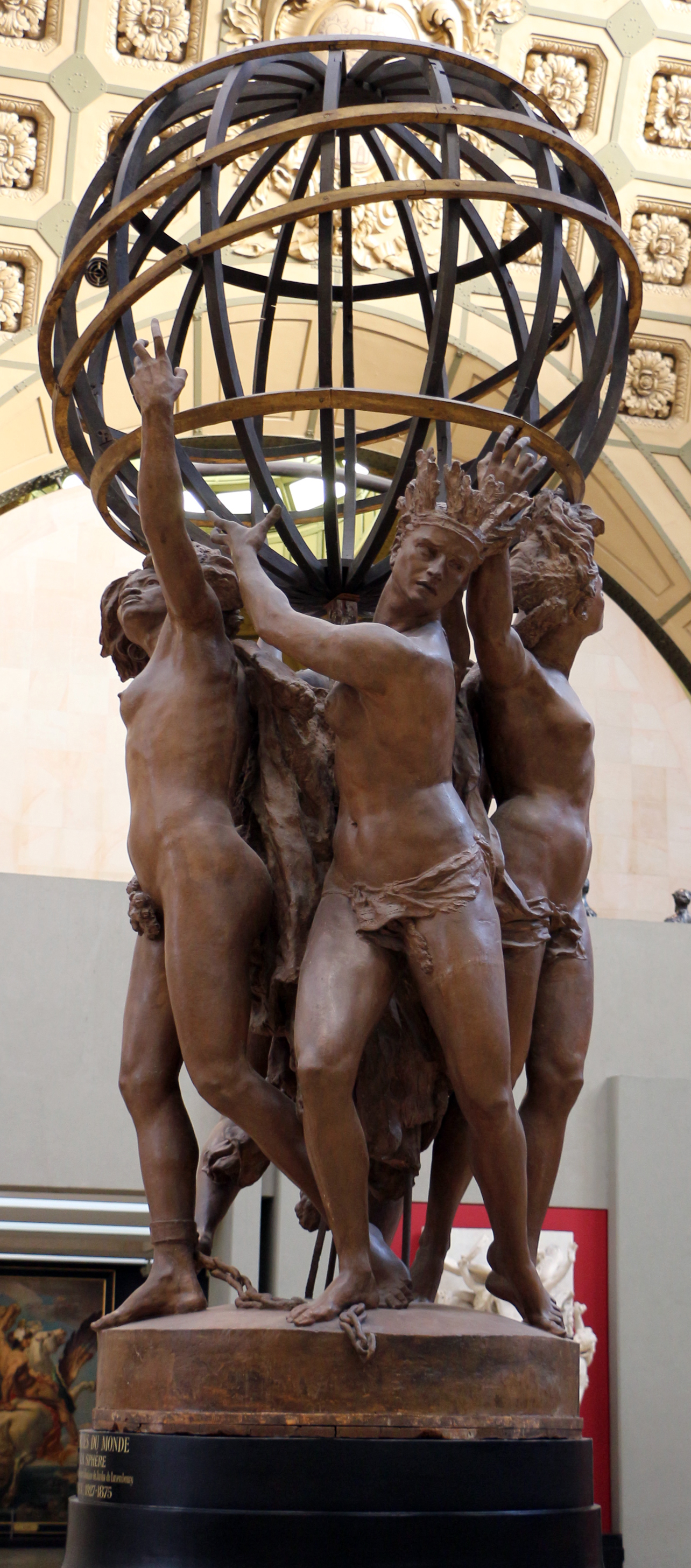
America

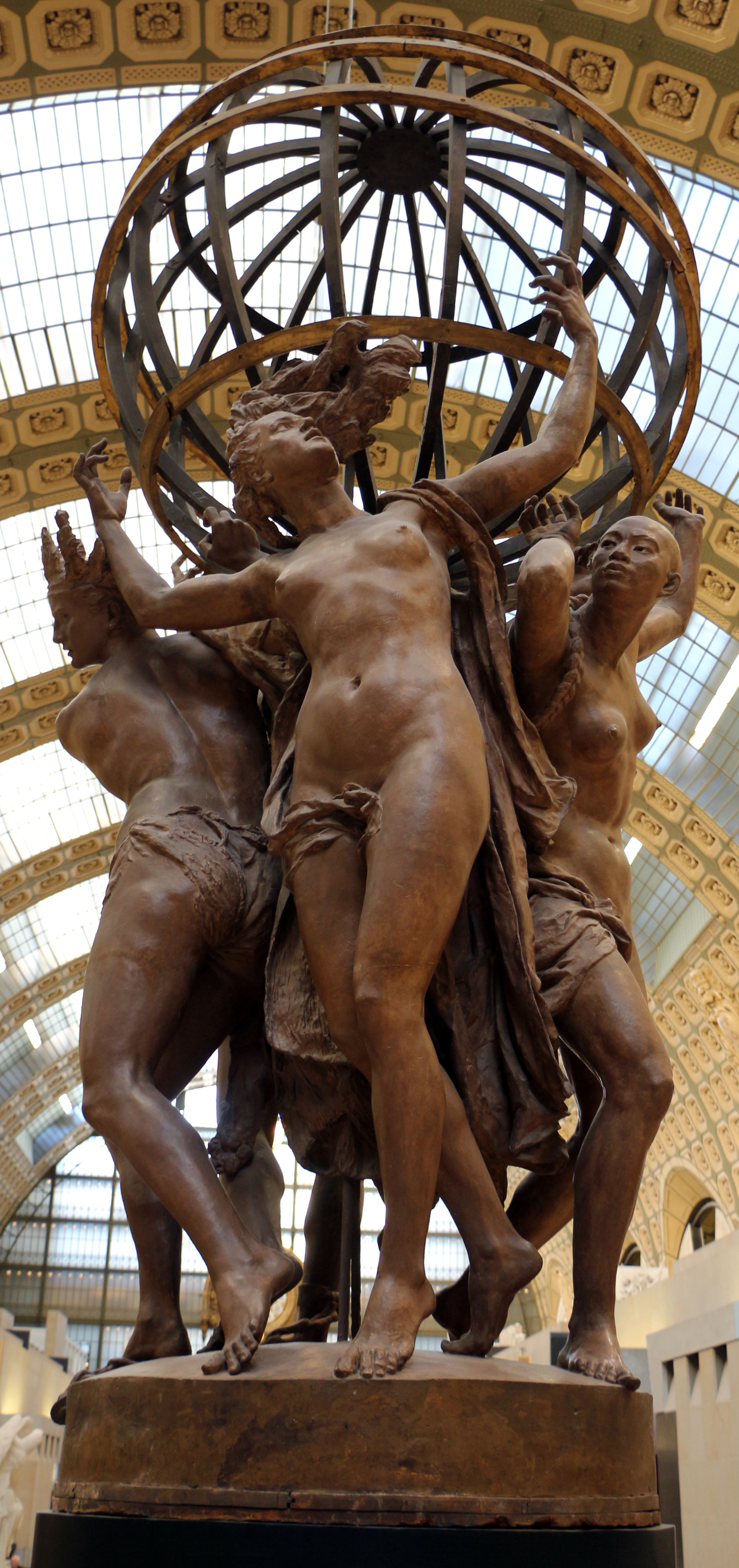
Europe

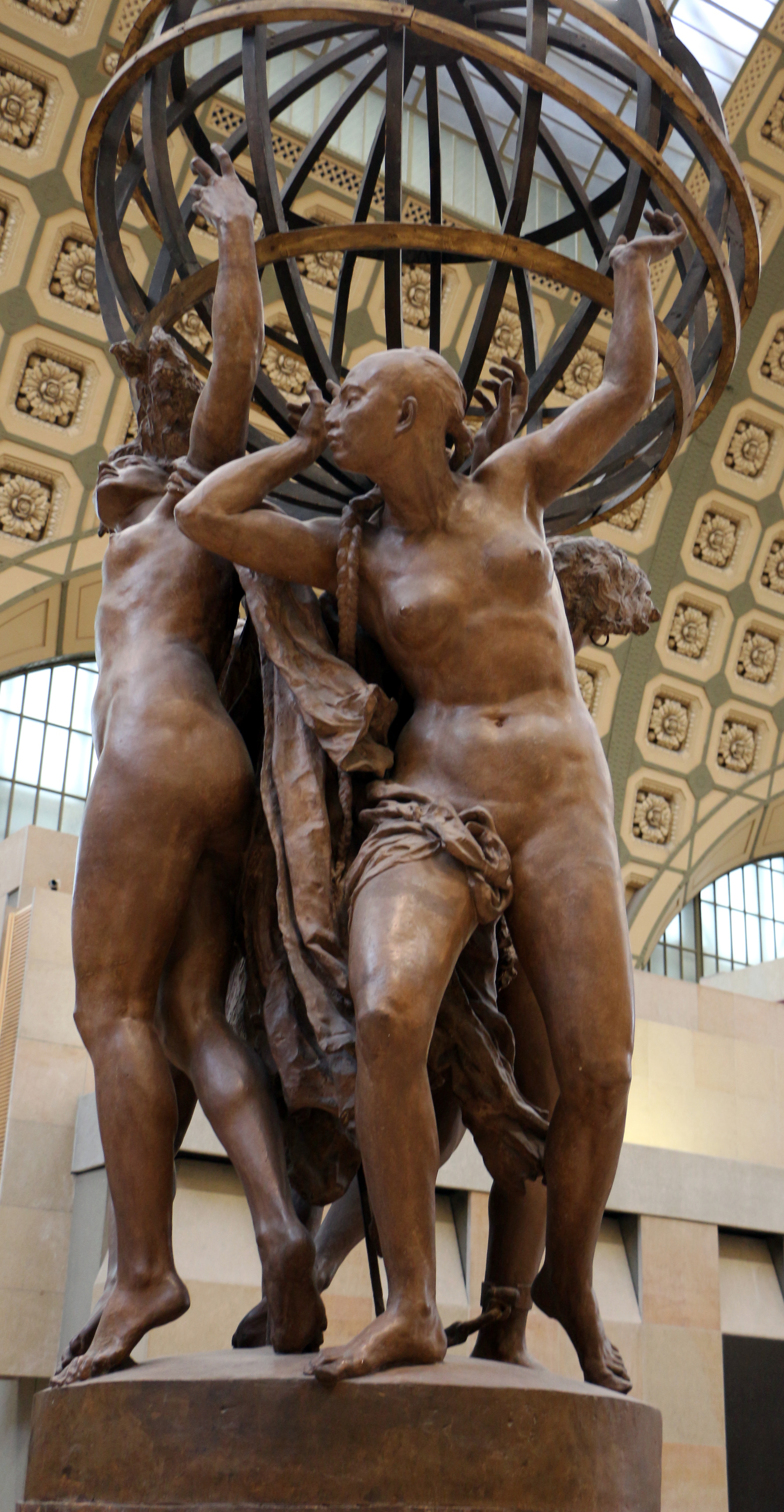
Asia

The work on the project was interrupted by the Franco-Prussian War of 1870, and the uprising of the Paris Commune. It was resumed in 1872, when plaster models were shown at the Paris Salon, the first since the fall of the Commune, and finished in 1874. Casting was by Matifat. Carpeaux was in poor health, and watched from a distance as the statues were installed in the fountain. He died the following year. Ten years later after Carpeaux was dead Clarétie reversed his judgement and praised the fountain as one of the masterpieces of Carpeaux.

== See also ==
- World peace, a sculpture in Helsinki, Finland by the Soviet sculptor Oleg Kiryuhin, said to have drawn inspiration from Carpeaux's sculpture Quatre-Parties-du-Monde

== Bibliography ==
- Paris et ses fontaines - de la Renaissance a nos jours, a collection of articles edited by Beatrice de Andia, Collection Paris et son patrimoine, Paris, 1995.
