= L'Amour à la folie =

L’Amour à la folie
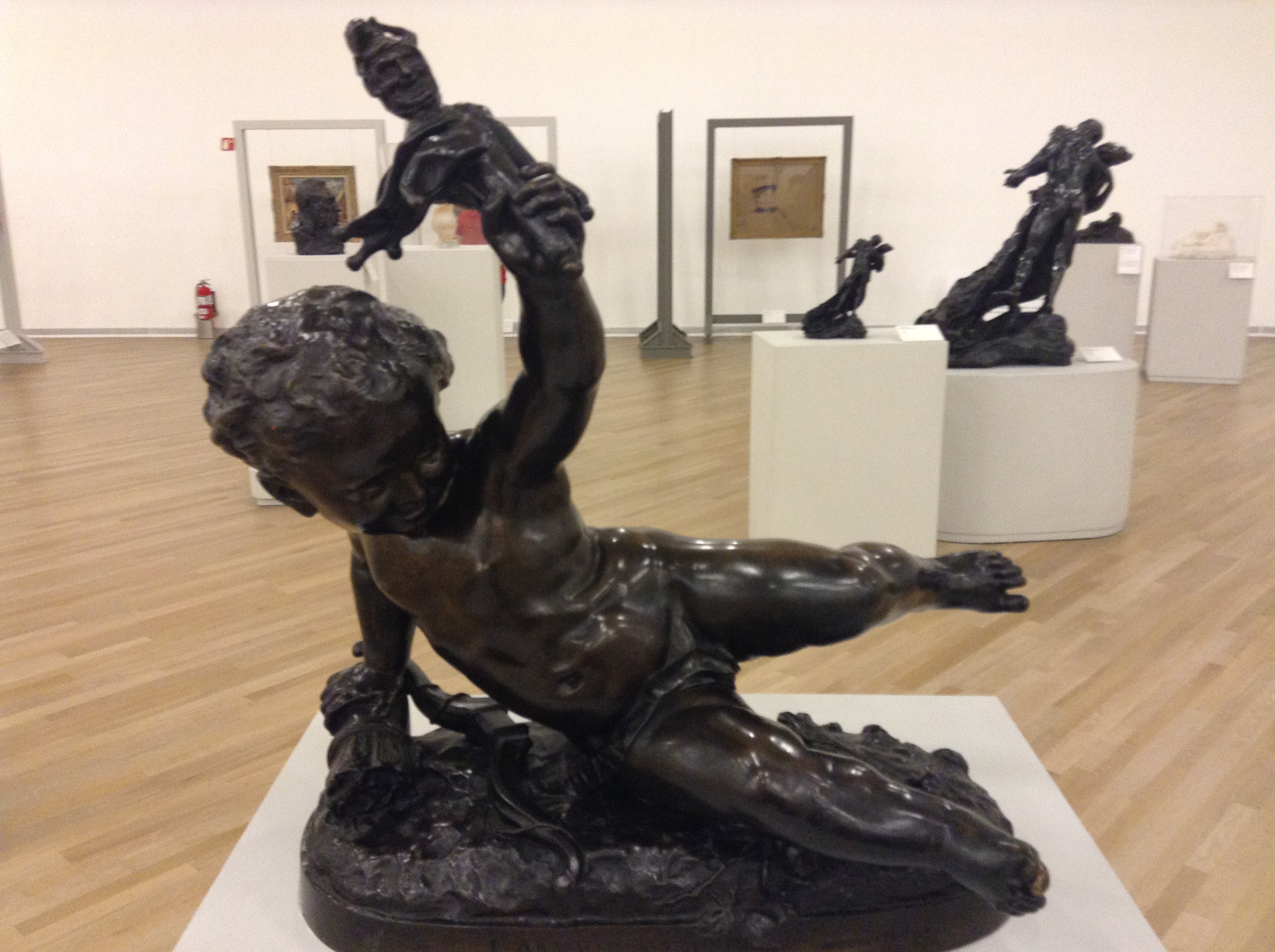
- On display in the Museo Soumaya
- Artist: Jean-Baptiste Carpeaux
- Year: 1869
- Type: Sculpture
- Dimensions: 70 cm × 67 cm × 44 cm (28 in × 26 in × 17 in)

L'Amour à la folie (Love to madness) is an 1869 sculpture by Jean-Baptiste Carpeaux, part of the sculptural group La Danse for the Paris Opéra Garnier. The sculpture was commissioned by the building's architect Charles Garnier. The Musée d'Orsay in Paris holds a terracotta edition (RF 2928), the Museo Soumaya in Mexico City holds both a terracotta and a bronze (Inv.° 274) and the Museu Calouste Gulbenkian in Lisbon holds an edition in marble (Inv.° 563).

Henry James wrote of the sculpture group in The New York Tribune in 1875:

Carpeaux was made famous by the extraordinary group of La Danse, which he contributed to the decoration of the new Opera. Every visitor to Paris has gazed at it in mingled admiration and perplexity, and it is a work which, so long as it stands there, will be sure to have gazers enough. If the whole building is characteristic of its time and place, Carpeaux's group is its most characteristic feature.

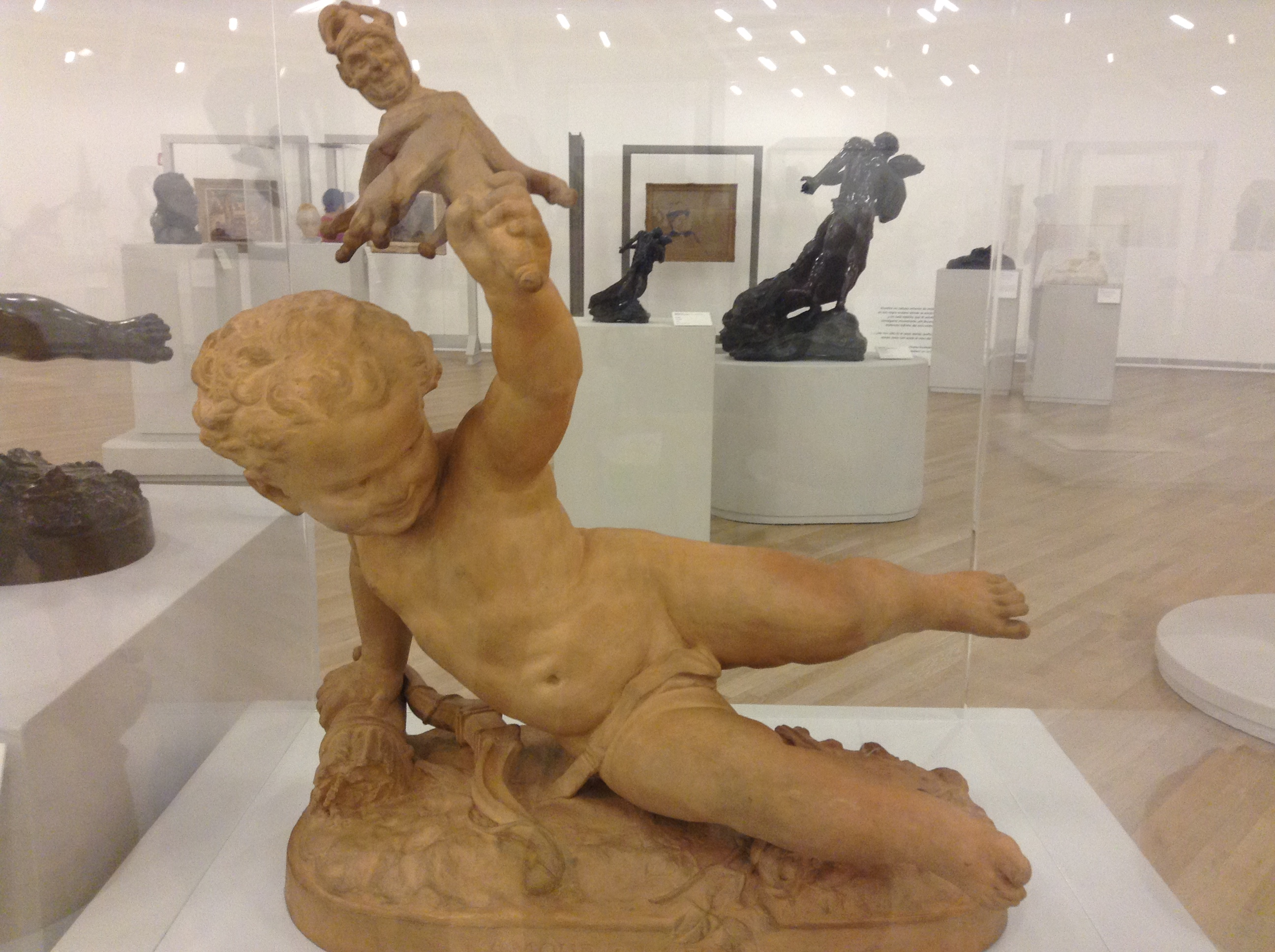
Terracotta edition in the collection of the Museo Soumaya

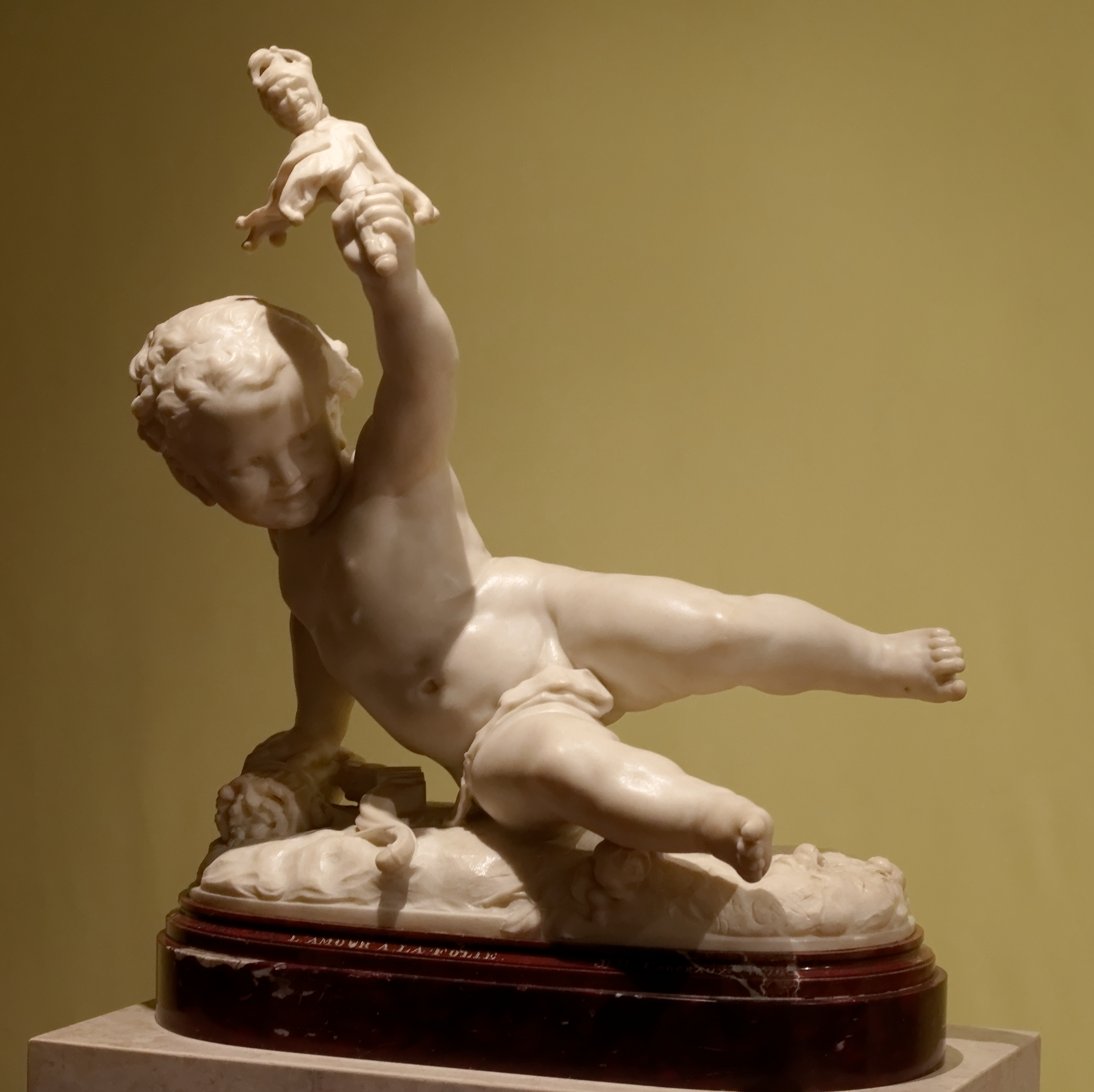
Marble edition (1872) in the collection of the Calouste Gulbenkian Museum A marble edition is held privately in Ireland.

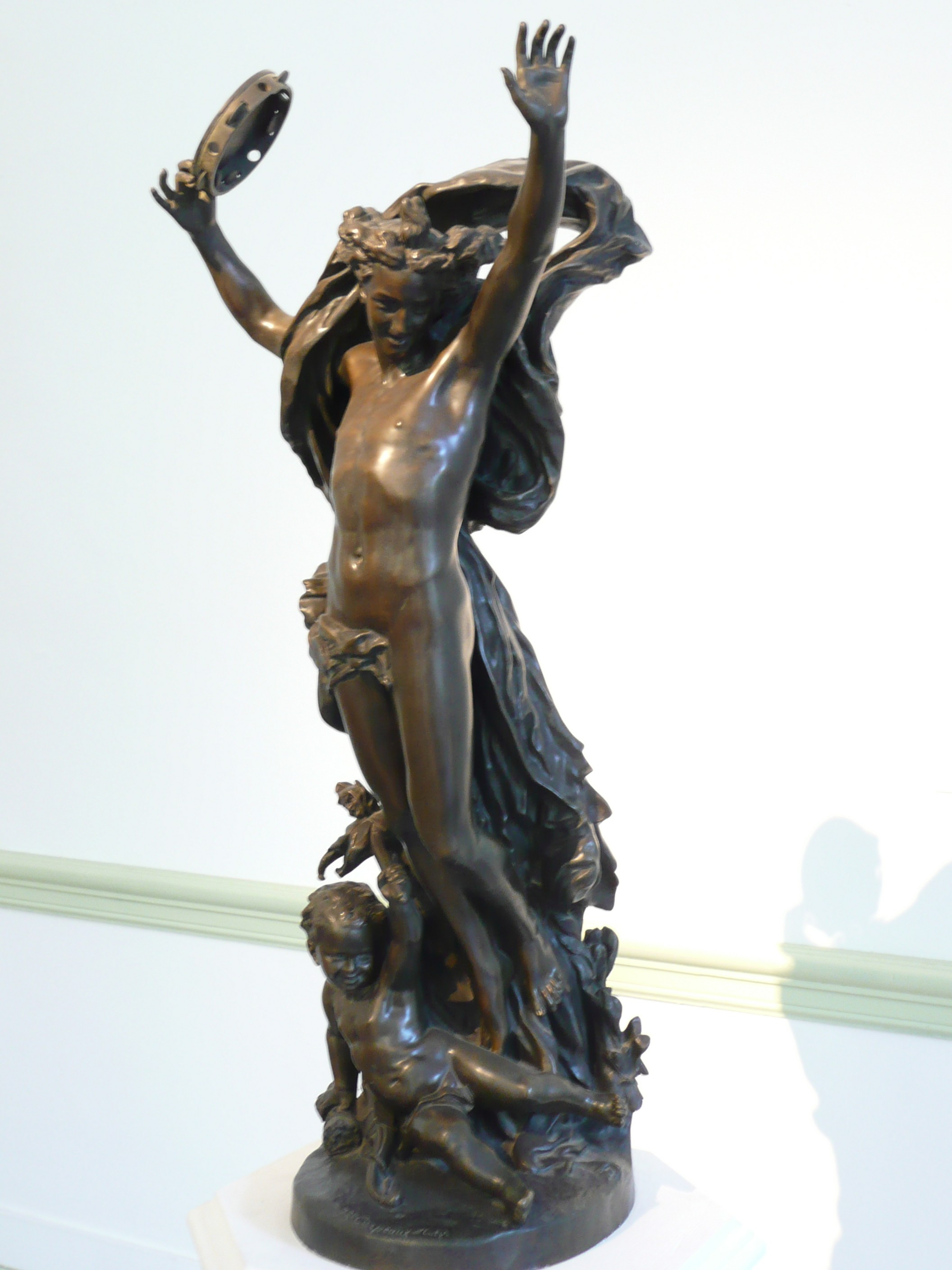
Génie de la Danse (1872) featuring avec l'Amour à la folie in the collection of Musée des Beaux-Arts de Nice
