= Jean-Baptiste Carpeaux =

French sculptor and painter (1827–1875)

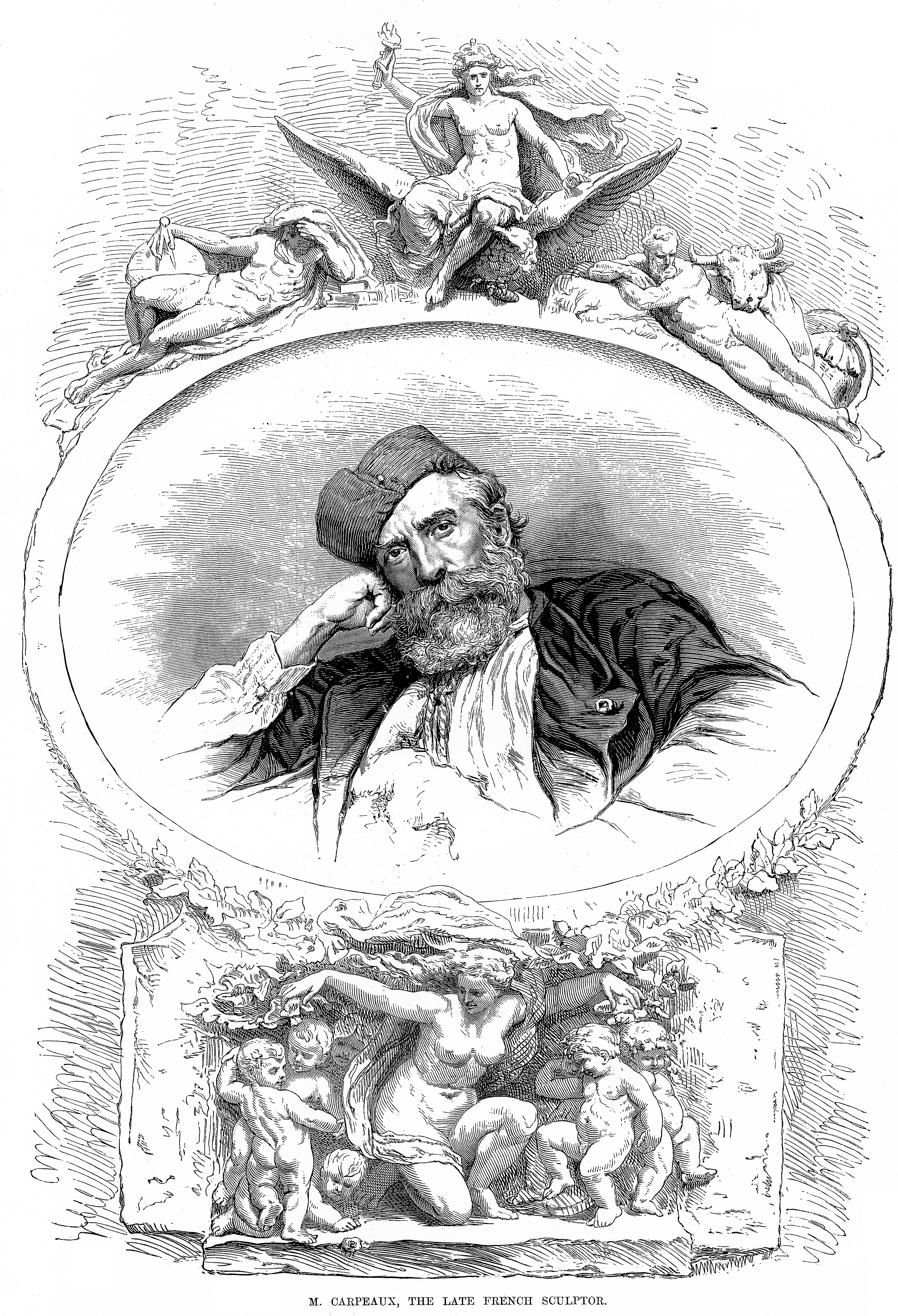
- Illustration of Carpeaux by Étienne Bocourt in the Illustrated Sporting and Dramatic News, after his death. His Flore is below him, and Imperial France protecting Agriculture and Sciences above
- Born: 11 May 1827; Valenciennes, France
- Died: 12 October 1875 (aged 48); Bécon-les-Bruyères (Courbevoie), France
- Known for: Sculpture, painting
- Notable work: La Fontaine des quatre parties due monde Triomphe de Flore; Le Génie de la Danse; Le Pécheur napolitain La Frileuse
- Patrons: Jean-Baptiste Foucart

Jean-Baptiste Carpeaux (French pronunciation: [ʒɑ̃ batist kaʁpo]; 11 May 1827 – 12 October 1875) was a French sculptor and painter during the Second Empire under Napoleon III.

== Life ==
Born in Valenciennes, Nord, son of a mason, his early studies were under François Rude. Carpeaux entered the École des Beaux-Arts in 1844 and won the Prix de Rome in 1854, and moving to Rome to find inspiration, he there studied the works of Michelangelo, Donatello and Verrocchio. Staying in Rome from 1854 to 1861, he obtained a taste for movement and spontaneity, which he joined with the great principles of baroque art. Carpeaux sought real life subjects in the streets and broke with the classical tradition.

Carpeaux debuted at the Salon of 1853 exhibiting La Soumission d'Abd-el-Kader al'Empereur, a bas-relief in plaster that did not attract much attention. Carpeaux was an admirer of Napoléon III and followed him from city to city during Napoléon's official trip through the north of France. After initially not making any contact with the emperor, he finally succeeded in arranging a face-to-face encounter at Amiens where he managed to convince Napoléon to commission a marble statue that was to be carried out by a practitioner, Charles Romain Capellaro.

Carpeaux soon grew tired of academicism and became a wanderer on the streets of Rome. He spent free time admiring the frescoes of Michelangelo at the Sistine Chapel. Carpeaux said, "When an artist feels pale and cold, he runs to Michelangelo in order to warm himself, as with the rays of the sun".

While a student in Rome, Carpeaux submitted a plaster version of Pêcheur napolitain à la coquille, the Neapolitan Fisherboy, to the French Academy. He carved the marble version several years later, showing it in the Salon of 1863. It was purchased for Napoleon III's empress, Eugénie. The statue of the young smiling boy was very popular, and Carpeaux created a number of reproductions and variations in marble and bronze. There is a copy, for instance, in the Samuel H. Kress Collection in the National Gallery of Art in Washington, D.C. Some years later, he carved the Girl with a Shell, a similar study.

In 1861, he made a bust of Princess Mathilde, and this later brought him several commissions from Napoleon III. Then in 1866, he established his own atelier in order to reproduce and make work on a grander scale. In 1866, he was made chevalier of the Legion of Honour.

He employed his brother as the sales manager and made a calculated effort to produce work that would appeal to a larger audience. On 12 October 1875, he died at George Barbu Știrbei's château in Bécon-les-Bruyères, outside Courbevoie.

Among his students were Jules Dalou, Jean-Louis Forain and the American sculptor Olin Levi Warner.

== Work ==
- Ugolin et ses fils (Ugolino and His Sons) (1861; Metropolitan Museum of Art) with versions in other museums including the Musée d'Orsay, Paris.
- The Dance, commissioned for the Opera Garnier in 1869, featuring several nude figures in a wild and boisterous dance, criticized as an offense to common decency
- Pêcheur à la coquille (Neapolitan Fisherboy) (Musée du Louvre, Paris)
- Young girl with a shell, Valenciennes
- Antoine Watteau monument, Valenciennes
- Flora and bas-reliefs for the southern facade of the Pavillon de Flore, Palais du Louvre, for architect Hector Lefuel, 1865
- The multifigure allegorical group on the top of the Hôtel de Ville (City Hall) of his home town, Valenciennes, 1860–1873
- Fontaine de l'Observatoire, also known as the Carpeaux Fountain, south of the Jardin du Luxembourg. Partly complete at his death, Carpeaux finished the terrestrial globe with the cardinal points represented by the four figures of Asia (East), Europe (North), America (West) and Africa (South).
- L'Amour à la folie, part of a group La Danse for the facade of the Opera Garnier (1869)

== Collections ==
Carpeaux's works are in the following collections:

- Art Institute of Chicago
- J. Paul Getty Museum
- Metropolitan Museum of Art
- Museum of Fine Arts, Boston
- Nasher Museum of Art at Duke University
- National Gallery of Art
- Smithsonian American Art Museum

== In popular culture ==
The Carpeaux: a cake made with butter cream and candied chestnuts between two oval macaroons is named in tribute to Jean-Baptiste Carpeaux.

== Images ==
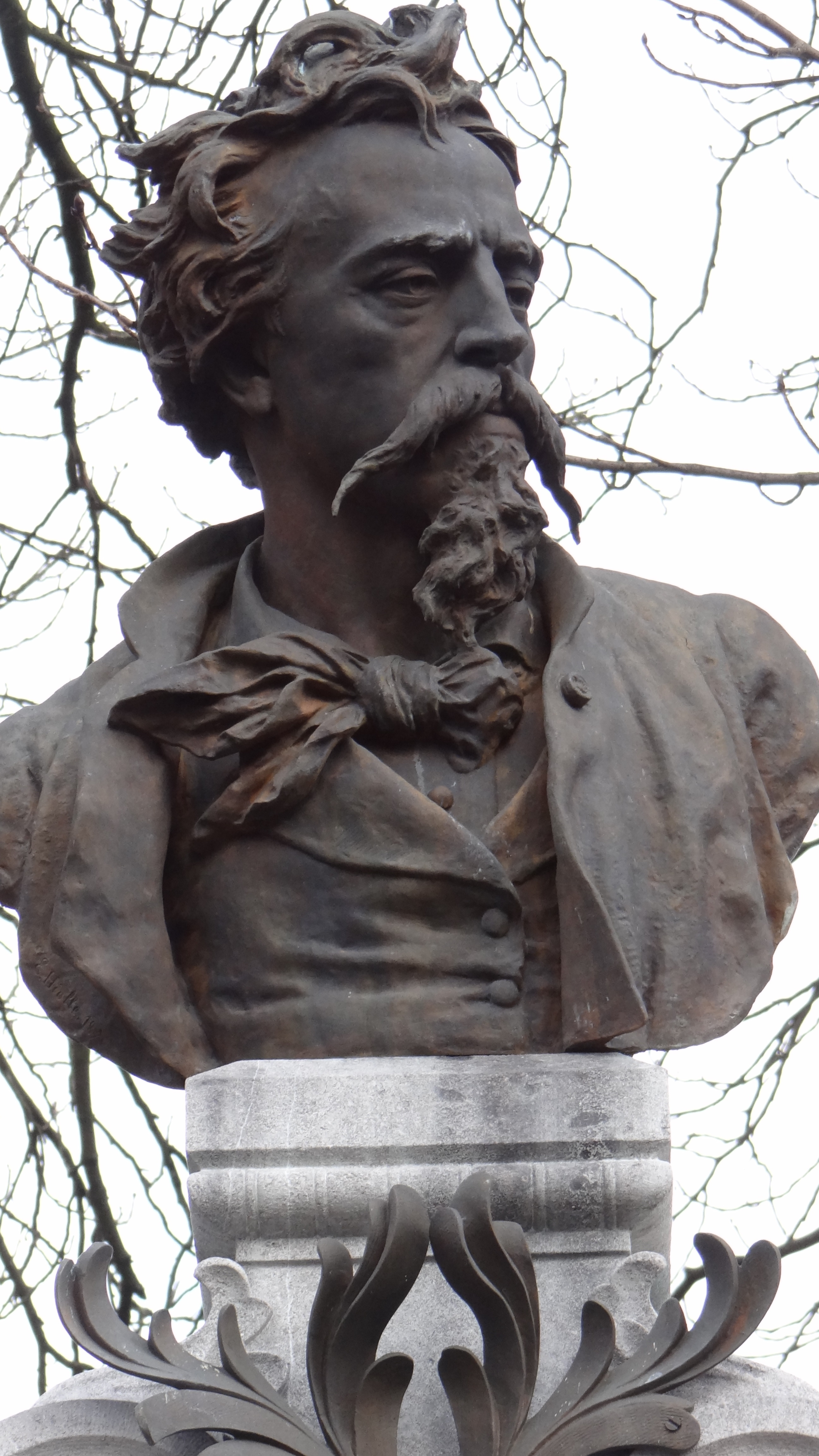
Bust of Carpeaux Saint Roch Cemetery

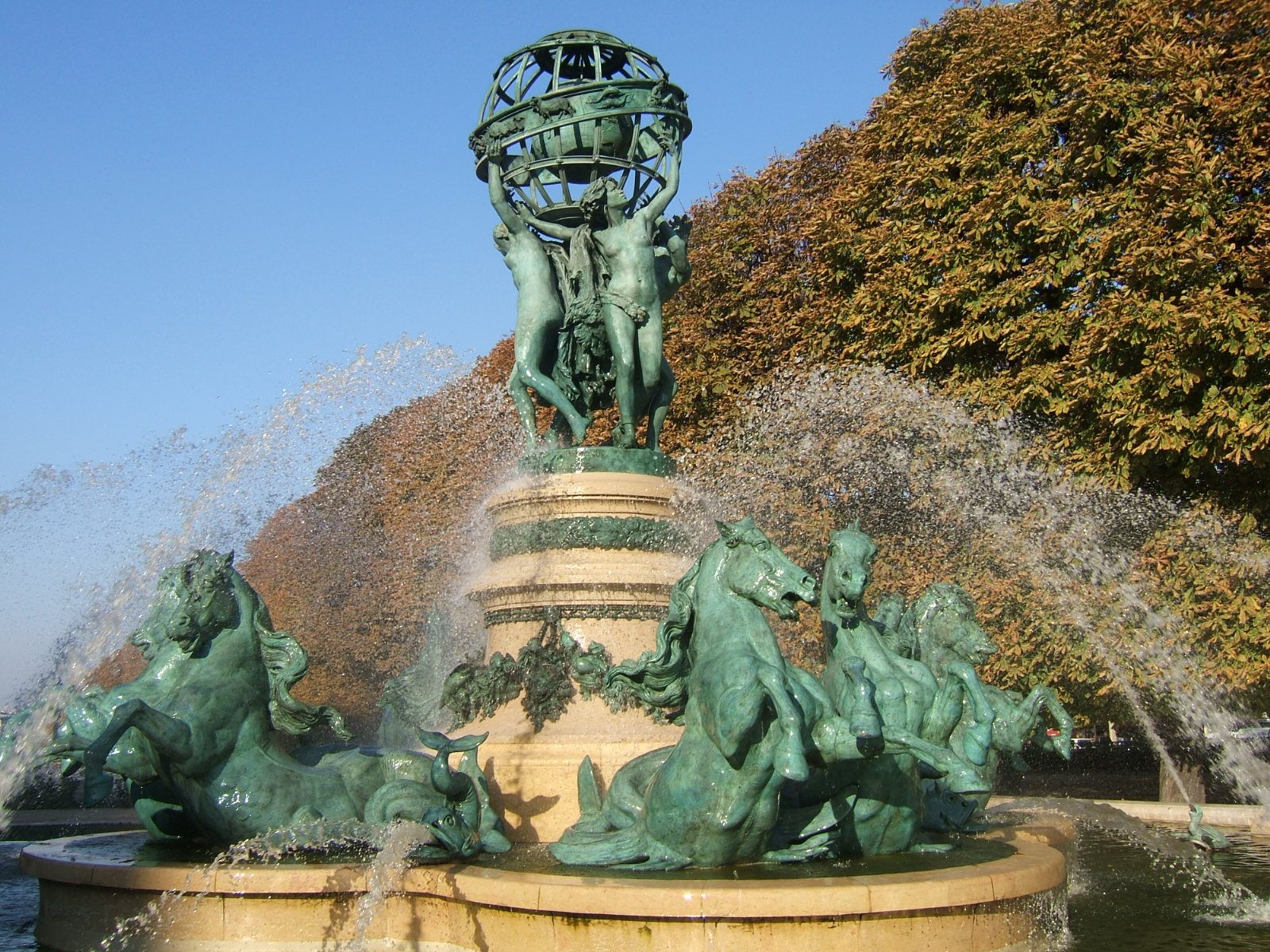
The Seasons turning the celestial Sphere for the Fountain of the Observatory, Jardin du Luxembourg

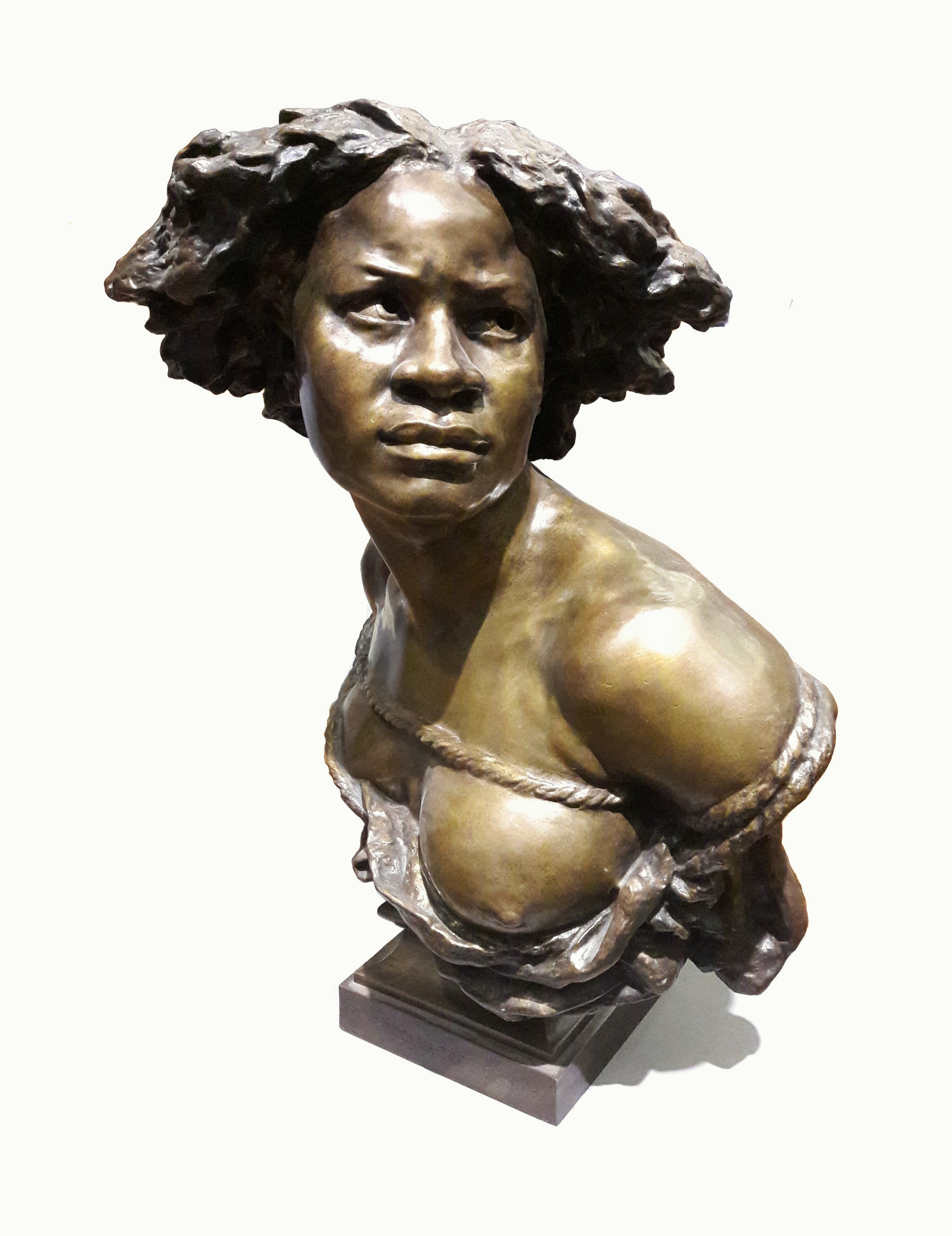
Why Born Enslaved! 1868, National Museum in Warsaw

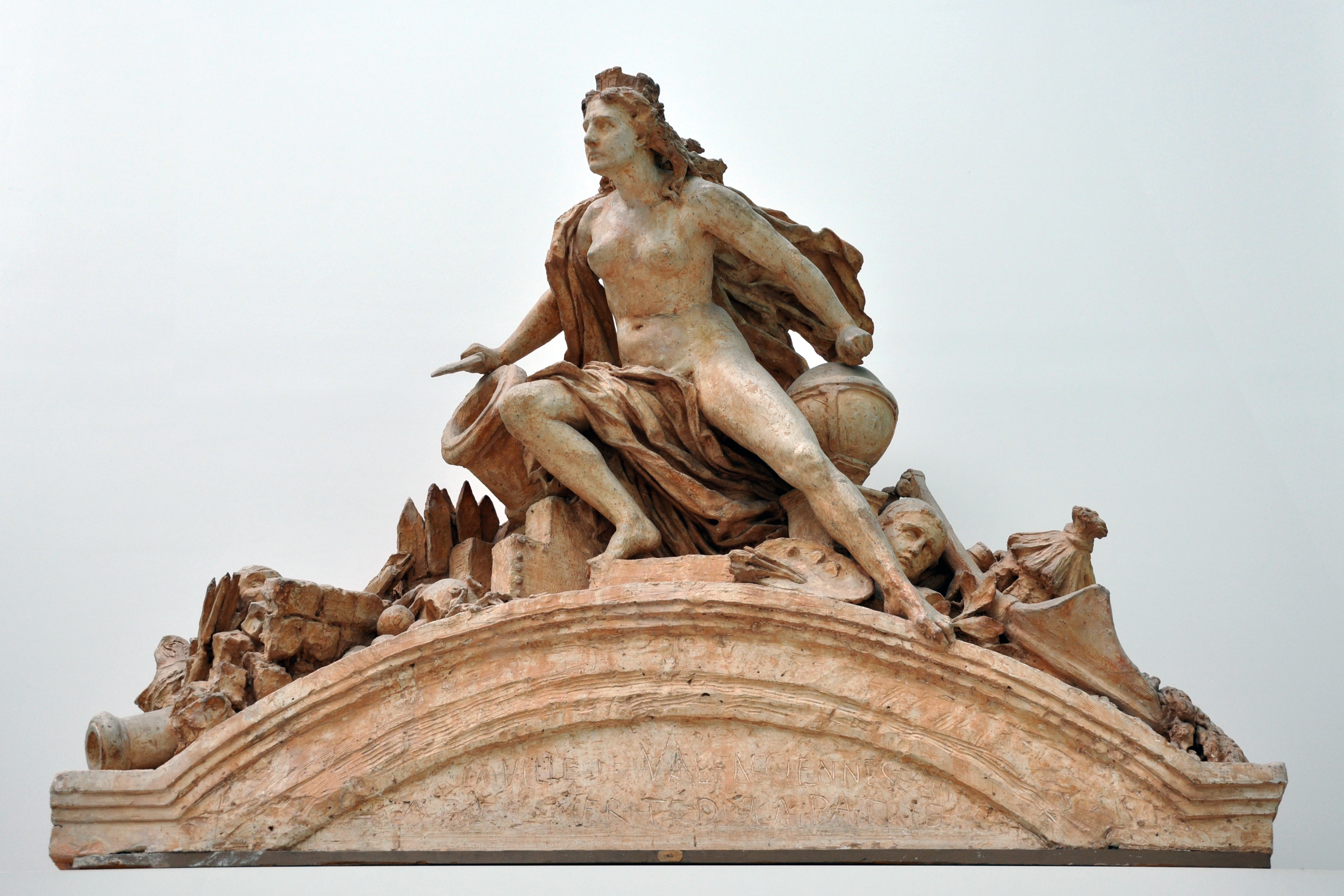
Patinated plaster model for Valenciennes defending the arts of peace with the arts of war

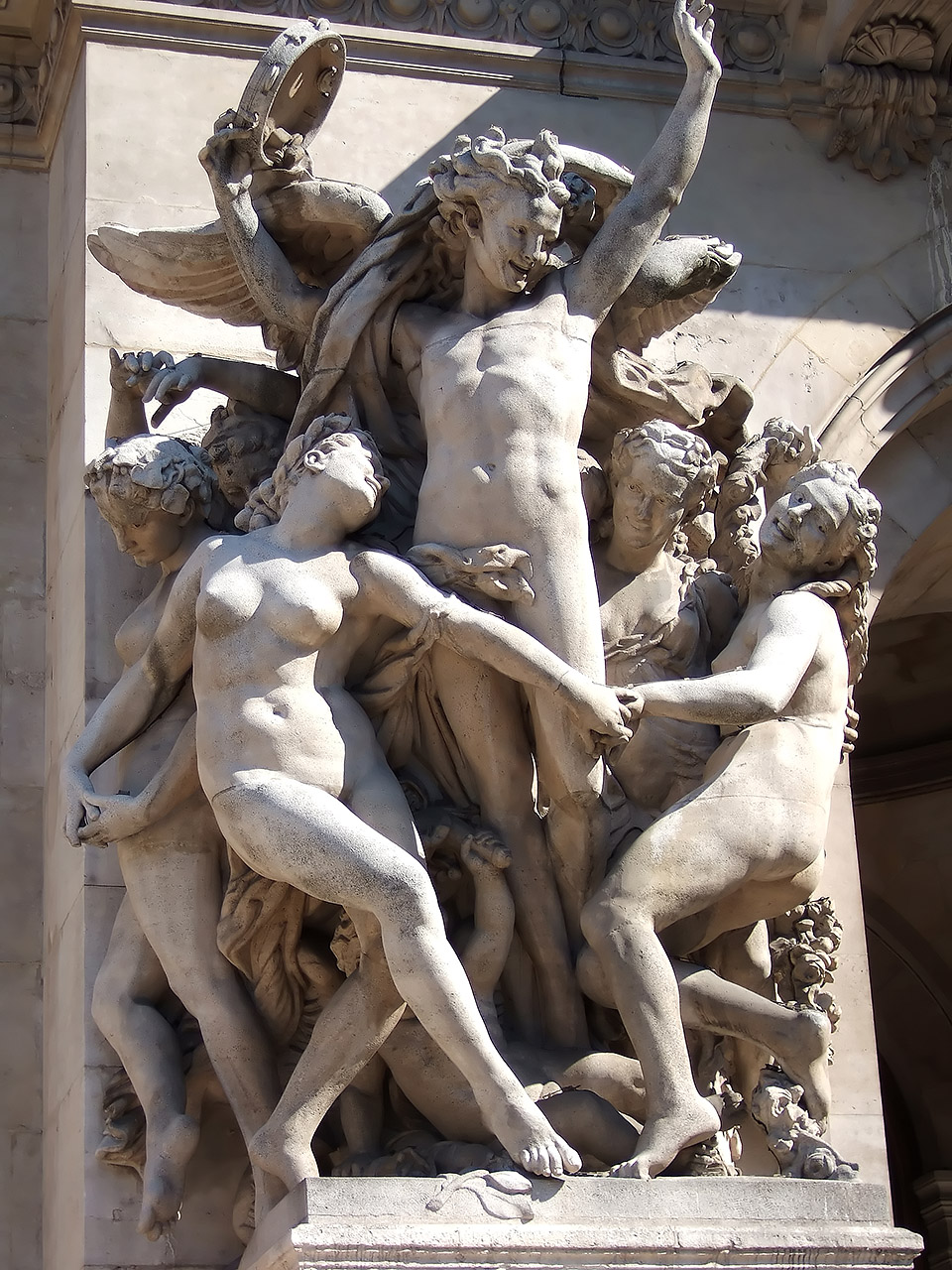
La Danse (The Dance), 1868, for the Opera Garnier, heavily criticized as being indecent

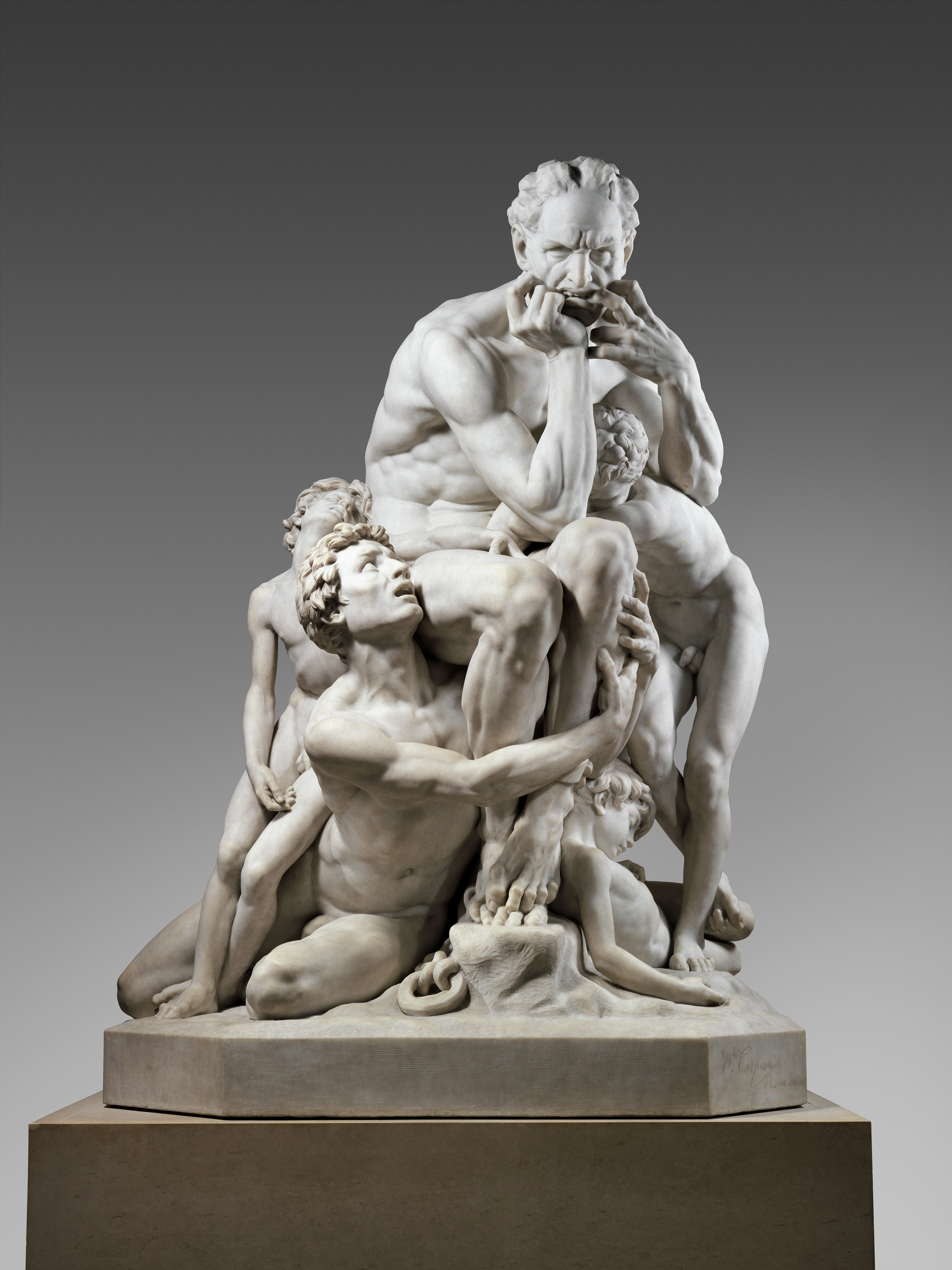
Ugolino and His Sons, 1857–1860. Photographed at the Metropolitan Museum of Art

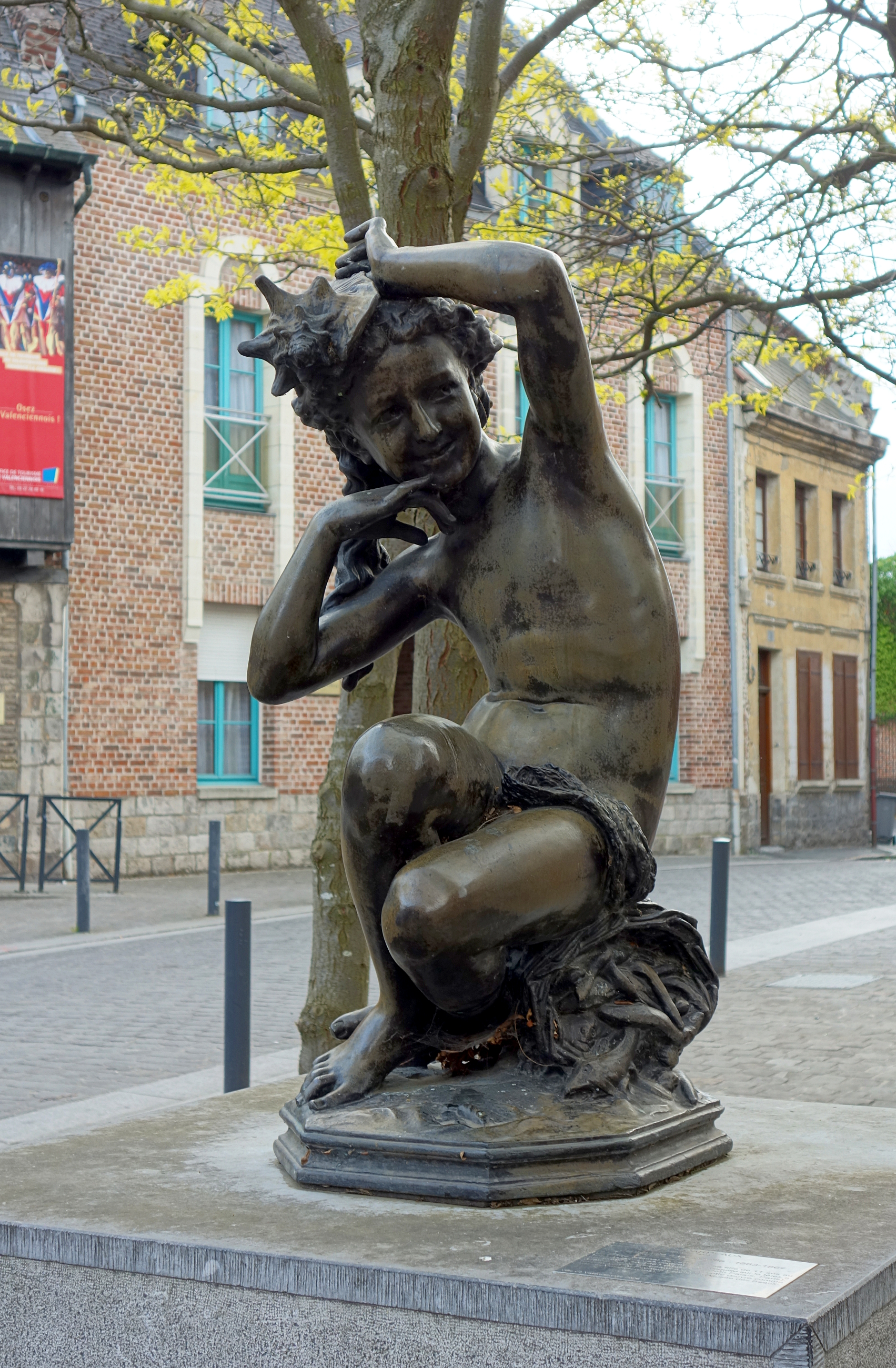
Young Girl With a Shell, Valenciennes

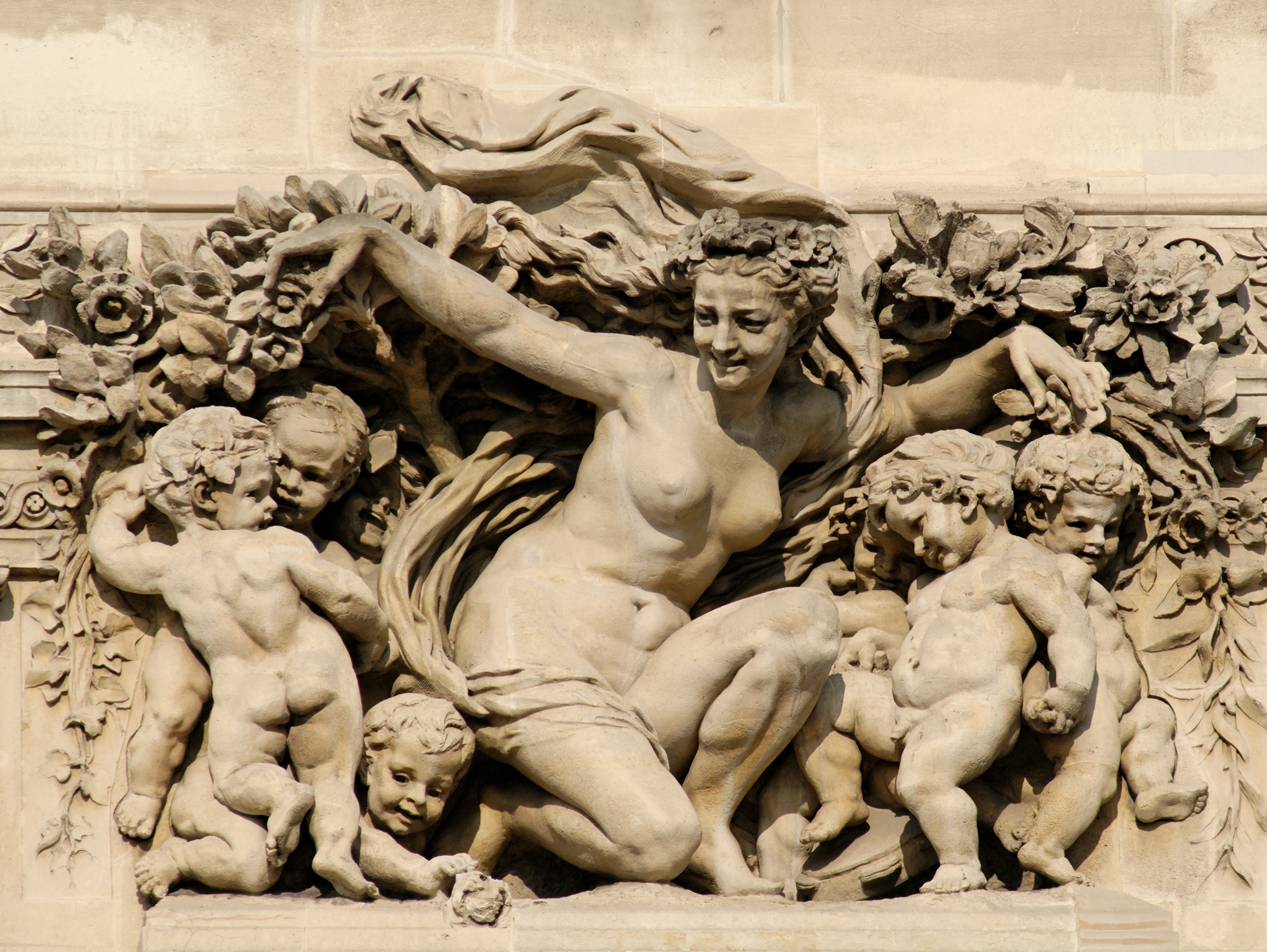
Le Triomphe de Flore (The Triumph of Flora), 1866. South façade of the Pavillon de Flore, Louvre Palace, Paris
