= La Danse (Carpeaux) =

1868 sculpture by Jean-Baptiste Carpeaux

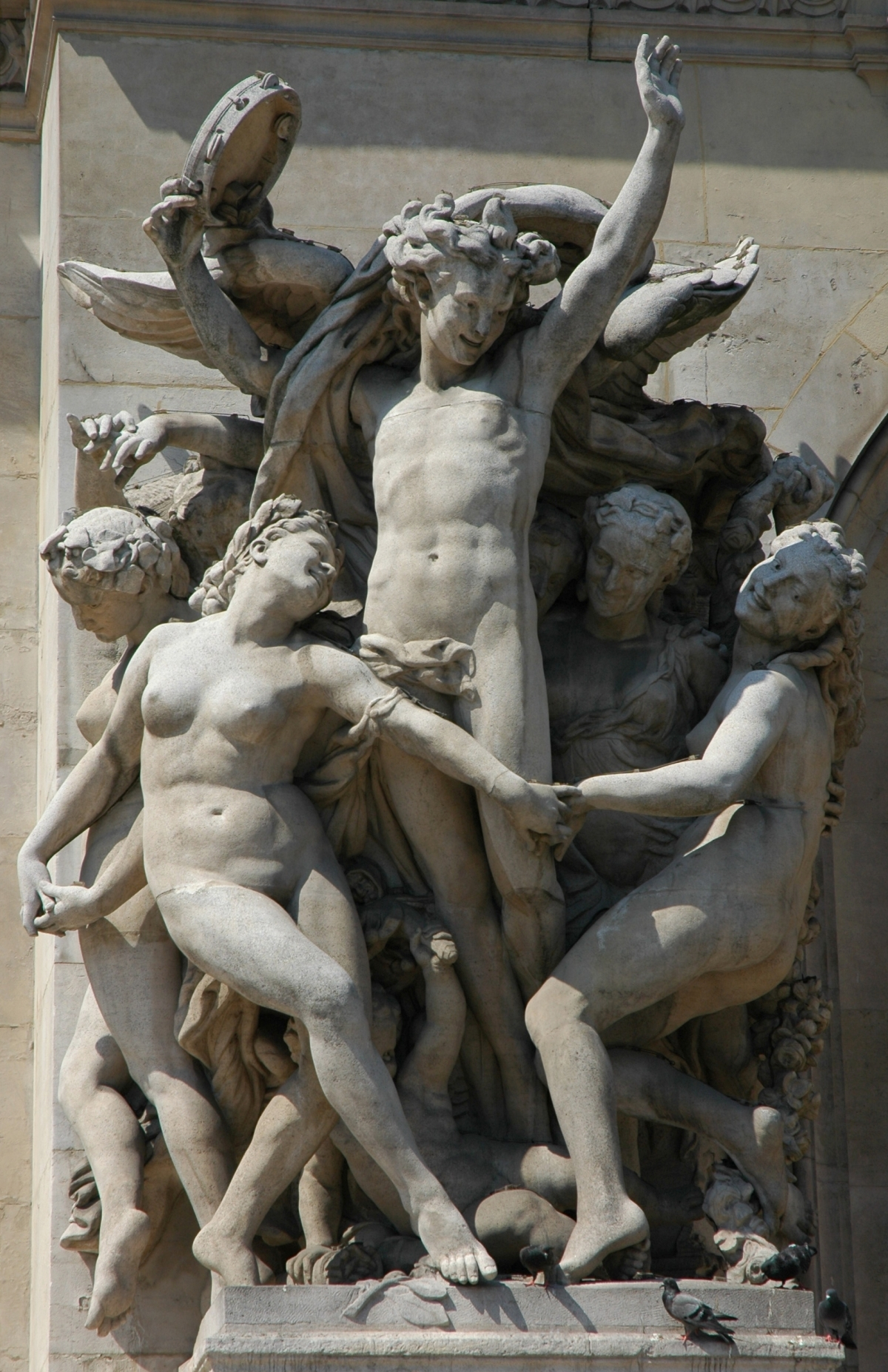
A copy of La Danse on the façade of the Paris Opera, the original was moved to the Musée d'Orsay in 1986

La Danse is an 1868 sculpture by the French artist Jean-Baptiste Carpeaux. It was one of four sculptural groups made from Echaillon marble that decorate the façade of the Opera Garnier in Paris, two to either side of the entrance at ground level. The work was installed in 1869, and widely criticised as obscene. It was attacked in August 1869 when an anonymous vandal threw black ink over it. The scandal subsided after the outbreak of the Franco-Prussian War in 1870, and the original statue remained on the façade at the opera until it was transferred to the Louvre Museum in 1964 and replaced by a copy. The original was moved to the Musée d'Orsay in 1986.

Carpeaux was commissioned by his friend Charles Garnier to make a group based on the dance of Bacchus. The sculpture comprises several human figures, for which Carpeaux made numerous sketches over three years, using actresses and dancers from the Palais-Royale as models. At the centre of the group, a garlanded young man with wings smiles as he holds aloft a tambourine while several women dance around him. It includes sculptural groups L'Amour à la folie. Carpeaux left out certain ideas, including a bacchante with lowered eyes (model held by the Metropolitan Museum of Art in New York).

Carpeaux completed a final model and the full-size statue in 1868, and it was unveiled at the Opera in July 1869. The unashamed nakedness of the figures, situated outdoors in full public view, provoked an immediate negative reaction, with some saying it would now be impossible for respectable women and girls to come to the Opera. The statue was attacked on the night of 27–28 August 1869, when black ink was thrown over the statue. The Opera considered moving the statue inside, but that was opposed by the corps de ballet. The scandal reached such a level Charles Gumery was commissioned to make a replacement (his gilded sculptures of L'Harmonie and La Poésie already crown the Opera's end pavilions). The issue was forgotten after the Franco-Prussian War broke out in July 1870, and Gumery died during the Siege of Paris. Carpeaux's work remained in place after his death in 1875, and Gumery's replacement is held by the Musée des Beaux-Arts d'Angers.

A 42-inch bronze cast reproduction of Carpeaux's Genius of the Dance, the central figure of La Danse, was acquired by the Virginia Museum of Fine Arts in 1983 for the museum's French galleries.

Carpeaux's original sculpture was moved to the Louvre Museum in 1964 to protect it from pollution, and it was replaced on the façade of the Opera Garnier by a copy made by Jean Juge. The original was moved to the Musée d'Orsay in 1986.

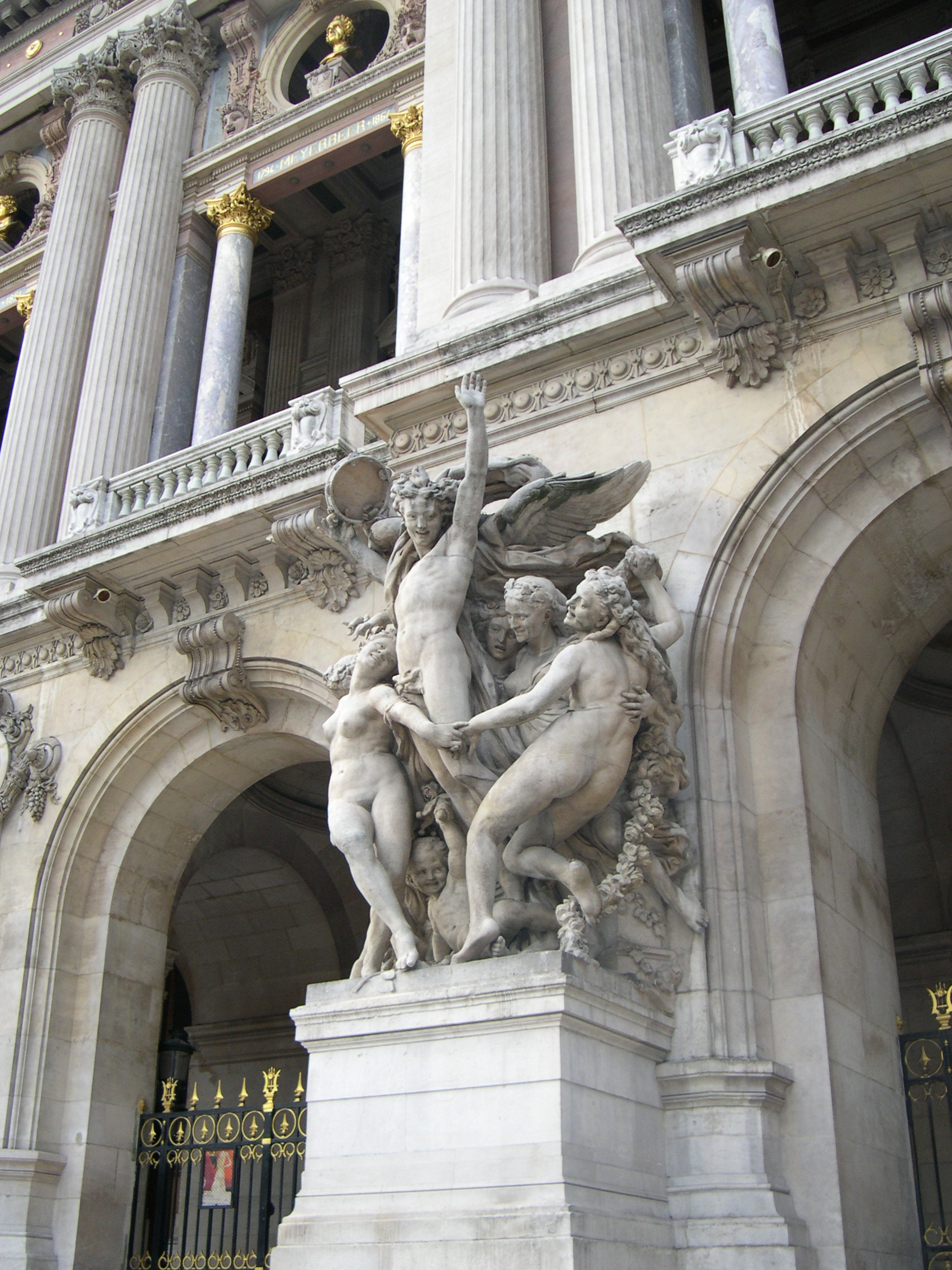
Sculpture at the Opéra Garnier

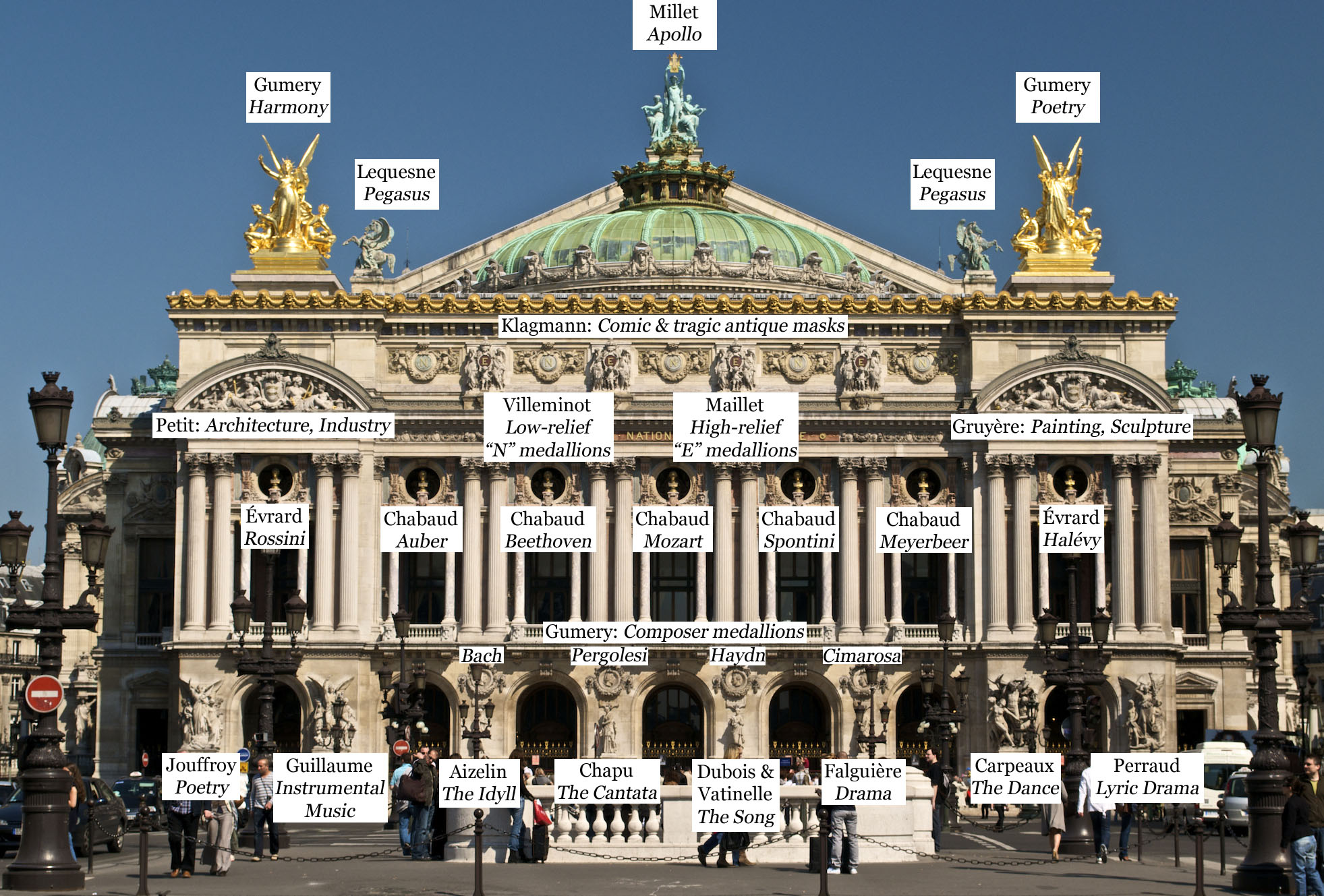
Façade of the Opéra Garnier, with sculpture labels
