= Louvre =

Art museum in Paris, France

Coordinates: 48°51′40″N 2°20′09″E

Musée du Louvre
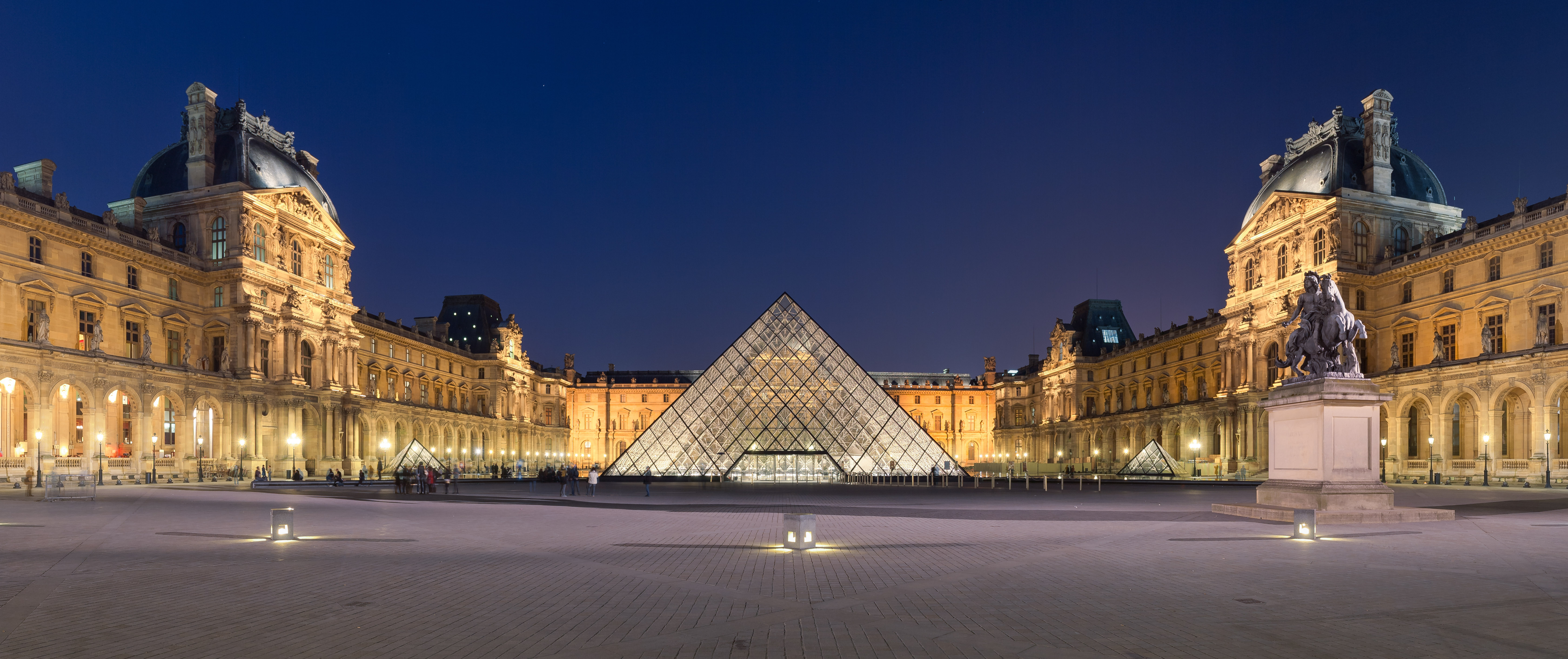
- The Louvre Museum and pyramid on the Cour Napoléon
- Established: 10 August 1793; 233 years ago
- Location: Musée du Louvre, 75001, Paris, France
- Type: Art museum and historic site
- Collection size: 615,797 in 2019 (35,000 on display)
- Visitors: 9.0 million (2025): Ranked 1st nationally; Ranked 1st globally
- Director: Christophe Leribault
- Curator: Marie-Laure de Rochebrune
- Public transit access: Palais Royal–Musée du Louvre; Louvre–Rivoli
- Website: Official website

The Louvre (Note: English: /ˈluːv.rə/ LOOV-rə, also US: /ˈluːv/ LOOV) (French: Musée du Louvre [myze dy luvʁ]) is a national art museum in Paris, France. It is located on the Right Bank of the Seine in the city's 1st arrondissement (district) and home to some of the most canonical works of Western art, including the Mona Lisa, Venus de Milo, and Winged Victory. The museum is housed in the Louvre Palace, originally built in the late 12th to 13th century under Philip II. Remnants of the Medieval Louvre fortress are visible in the basement of the museum. Due to urban expansion, the fortress eventually lost its defensive function, and in 1546 Francis I converted it into the primary residence of the French kings.

The building was redesigned and extended many times to form the present Louvre Palace. In 1682, Louis XIV chose the Palace of Versailles for his household, leaving the Louvre primarily as a place to display the royal collection, including, from 1692, a collection of ancient Greek and Roman sculptures. In 1692, the building was occupied by the Académie des Inscriptions et Belles-Lettres and the Académie Royale de Peinture et de Sculpture, which in 1699 held the first of a series of salons. The Académie remained at the Louvre for 100 years. During the French Revolution, the National Assembly decreed that the Louvre should be used as a museum to display the nation's masterpieces. The palace and exhibition space was expanded in the 19th century and again in the 20th.

The museum opened on 10 August 1793 with an exhibition of 537 paintings, the majority of the works being royal and confiscated church property. Because of structural problems with the building, the museum was closed from 1796 until 1801. The collection was increased under Napoleon, after the Napoleonic looting of art in Europe, Egypt, and Syria, and the museum was renamed Musée Napoléon, but after Napoleon's abdication, many works seized by his armies were returned to their original owners. The collection was further increased during the reigns of Louis XVIII and Charles X, and during the Second French Empire the museum gained 20,000 pieces. Holdings have grown steadily through donations and bequests since the Third Republic. The collection is divided into eight departments: Egyptian Antiquities; Near Eastern Antiquities; Greek, Etruscan, and Roman Antiquities; Islamic Art; Sculpture; Decorative Arts; Paintings; Prints and Drawings.

The Musée du Louvre contains approximately 500,000 objects and displays 35,000 works of art in eight curatorial departments with more than 60,600 m^{2} (652,000 sq ft) dedicated to the permanent collection. The Louvre exhibits sculptures, objets d'art, paintings, drawings, and archaeological finds. At any given point in time, approximately 38,000 objects from prehistory to the 21st century are being exhibited over an area of 72,735 m^{2} (782,910 sq ft), making it the largest museum in the world. It received 9.0 million visitors in 2025. It is ranked as the most-visited art museum, and most-visited museum of any category.

== Location and visiting ==
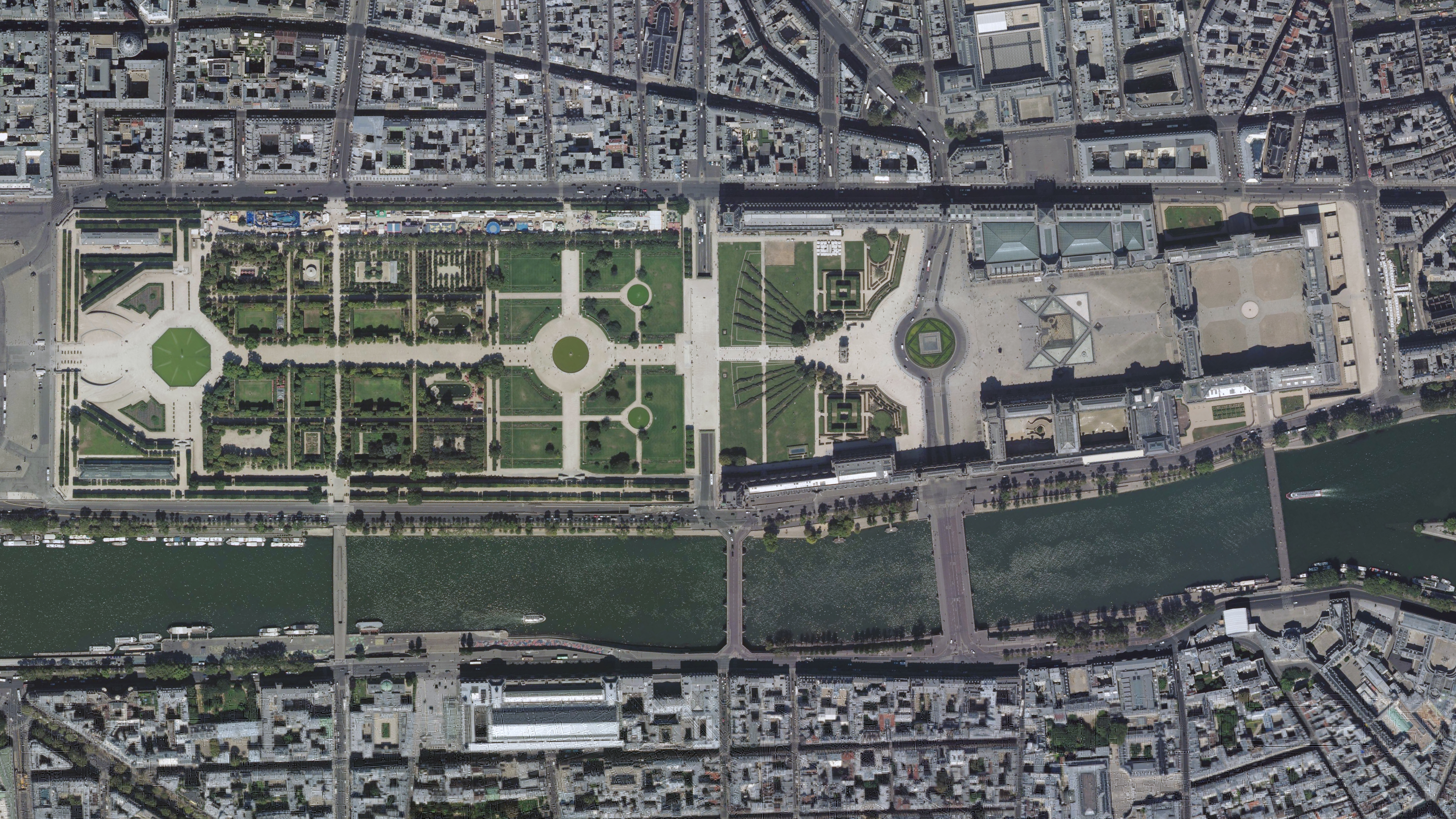
Aerial view of the Tuileries Gardens on the left, with the Louvre Palace on the right (2018)

The Louvre Museum is located inside the Louvre Palace, in the centre of Paris, adjacent to the Tuileries Gardens. The two nearest Métro stations are Louvre–Rivoli and Palais Royal–Musée du Louvre, the latter having a direct underground access to the Carrousel du Louvre commercial mall.

Before the Grand Louvre overhaul of the late 1980s and 1990s, the Louvre had several street-level entrances, most of which are now permanently closed. Since 1993, the museum's main entrance has been the underground space under the Louvre Pyramid, or Hall Napoléon, which can be accessed from the Pyramid itself, from the underground Carrousel du Louvre, or (for authorised visitors) from the passage Richelieu connecting to the nearby rue de Rivoli. A secondary entrance at the Porte des Lions, near the western end of the Denon Wing, was created in 1999 but is not permanently open.

The museum's entrance conditions have varied over time. Prior to the 1850s, artists and foreign visitors had privileged access. At the time of initial opening in 1793, the French Republican calendar had imposed ten-day "weeks" (French: décades), the first six days of which were reserved for visits by artists and foreigners and the last three for visits by the general public. In the early 1800s, after the seven-day week had been reinstated, the general public had only four hours of museum access per week, between 2pm and 4pm on Saturdays and Sundays. In 1824, a new regulation allowed public access only on Sundays and holidays; the other days the museum was open only to artists and foreigners, except for closure on Mondays. That changed in 1855 when the museum became open to the public all days except Mondays. It was free until 1922, when an entrance fee was introduced except on Sundays. Since its post-World War II reopening in 1946, the Louvre has been closed on Tuesdays, and habitually open to the public the rest of the week except for some holidays.

The use of cameras and video recorders is permitted inside, but flash photography is forbidden.

Beginning in 2012, Nintendo 3DS portable video game systems were used as the official museum audio guides. The following year, the museum contracted Nintendo to create a 3DS-based audiovisual visitor guide. Entitled Nintendo 3DS Guide: Louvre, it contains over 30 hours of audio and over 1,000 photographs of artwork and the museum itself, including 3D views, and also provides navigation thanks to differential GPS transmitters installed within the museum.

The upgraded 2013 Louvre guide was also announced in a special Nintendo Direct featuring Satoru Iwata and Shigeru Miyamoto demonstrating it at the museum, and 3DS XLs pre-loaded with the guide are available to rent at the museum. The 3DS Louvre guide was scheduled to be retired in September 2025 and will be replaced by a different guide system.

== History ==
=== Before the museum ===
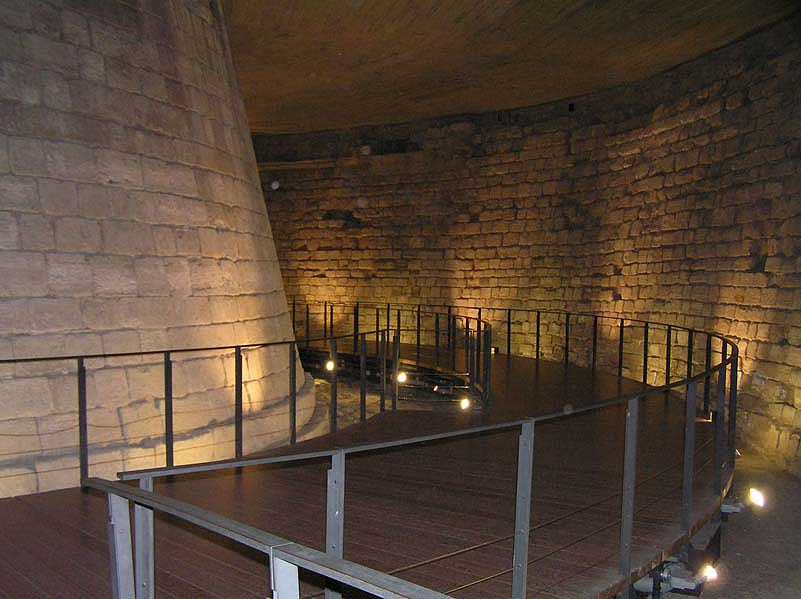
Below-ground portions of the medieval Louvre are still visible.

The Louvre Palace, which houses the museum, was begun by King Philip II in the late 12th century to protect the city from attack from the west, as the Kingdom of England still held Normandy at the time. Remnants of the Medieval Louvre are still visible in the crypt. Whether this was the first building on that spot is not known, and it is possible that Philip modified an existing tower.

The origins of the name "Louvre" are somewhat disputed. According to the authoritative Grand Larousse encyclopédique, the name derives from an association with a wolf hunting den (via Latin: lupus, lower Empire: lupara). In the 7th century, Burgundofara (also known as Saint Fare), abbess in Meaux, is said to have given part of her "Villa called Luvra situated in the region of Paris" to a monastery, even though it is doubtful that this land corresponded exactly to the present site of the Louvre. However, linguistically it would be sounder to derive the word from the French verb louer (to let, rent), with the Old French noun-building suffix -re appended (like in oeuvre, genre, ogre, bougre etc.), signifying something which is let or rented. According to DuCange's medieval Latin glossary, louvagium in medieval France was a kind of fee or rent paid for the use of something.

The Louvre Palace has been subject to numerous renovations since its construction. In the 14th century, Charles V converted the building from its military role into a residence. In 1546, Francis I started its rebuilding in French Renaissance style. After Louis XIV chose Versailles as his residence in 1682, construction works slowed to a halt. The royal move away from Paris resulted in the Louvre being used as a residence for artists, under Royal patronage. For example, four generations of craftsmen-artists from the Boulle family were granted Royal patronage and resided in the Louvre.

Meanwhile, the collections of the Louvre originated in the acquisitions of paintings and other artworks by the monarchs of the House of France. At the Palace of Fontainebleau, Francis collected art that would later be part of the Louvre's art collections, including Leonardo da Vinci's Mona Lisa.

The Cabinet du Roi consisted of seven rooms west of the Galerie d'Apollon on the upper floor of the remodelled Petite Galerie. Many of the king's paintings were placed in these rooms in 1673, when it became an art gallery, accessible to certain art lovers as a kind of museum. In 1681, after the court moved to Versailles, 26 of the paintings were transferred there, somewhat diminishing the collection, but it is mentioned in Paris guide books from 1684 on, and was shown to ambassadors from Siam in 1686.

By the mid-18th century there were proposals to create a public gallery in the Louvre. Art critic Étienne La Font de Saint-Yenne in 1747 published a call for a display of the royal collection. On 14 October 1750, Louis XV decided on a display of 96 pieces from the royal collection, mounted in the Galerie royale de peinture of the Luxembourg Palace. A hall was opened by Le Normant de Tournehem and the Marquis de Marigny for public viewing of the "king's paintings" (Tableaux du Roy) on Wednesdays and Saturdays. The Luxembourg gallery included Andrea del Sarto's Charity and works by Raphael; Titian; Veronese; Rembrandt; Poussin or Van Dyck. It closed in 1780 as a result of the royal gift of the Luxembourg palace to the Count of Provence (the future king, Louis XVIII) by the king in 1778. Under Louis XVI, the idea of a royal museum in the Louvre came closer to fruition. The comte d'Angiviller broadened the collection and in 1776 proposed to convert the Grande Galerie of the Louvre – which at that time contained the plans-reliefs or 3D models of key fortified sites in and around France – into the "French Museum". Many design proposals were offered for the Louvre's renovation into a museum, without a final decision being made on them. Hence the museum remained incomplete until the French Revolution.

=== Revolutionary opening ===
The Louvre finally became a public museum during the French Revolution. In May 1791, the National Constituent Assembly declared that the Louvre would be "a place for bringing together monuments of all the sciences and arts". On 10 August 1792, Louis XVI was imprisoned and the royal collection in the Louvre became national property. Because of fear of vandalism or theft, on 19 August, the National Assembly pronounced the museum's preparation urgent. In October, a committee to "preserve the national memory" began assembling the collection for display.

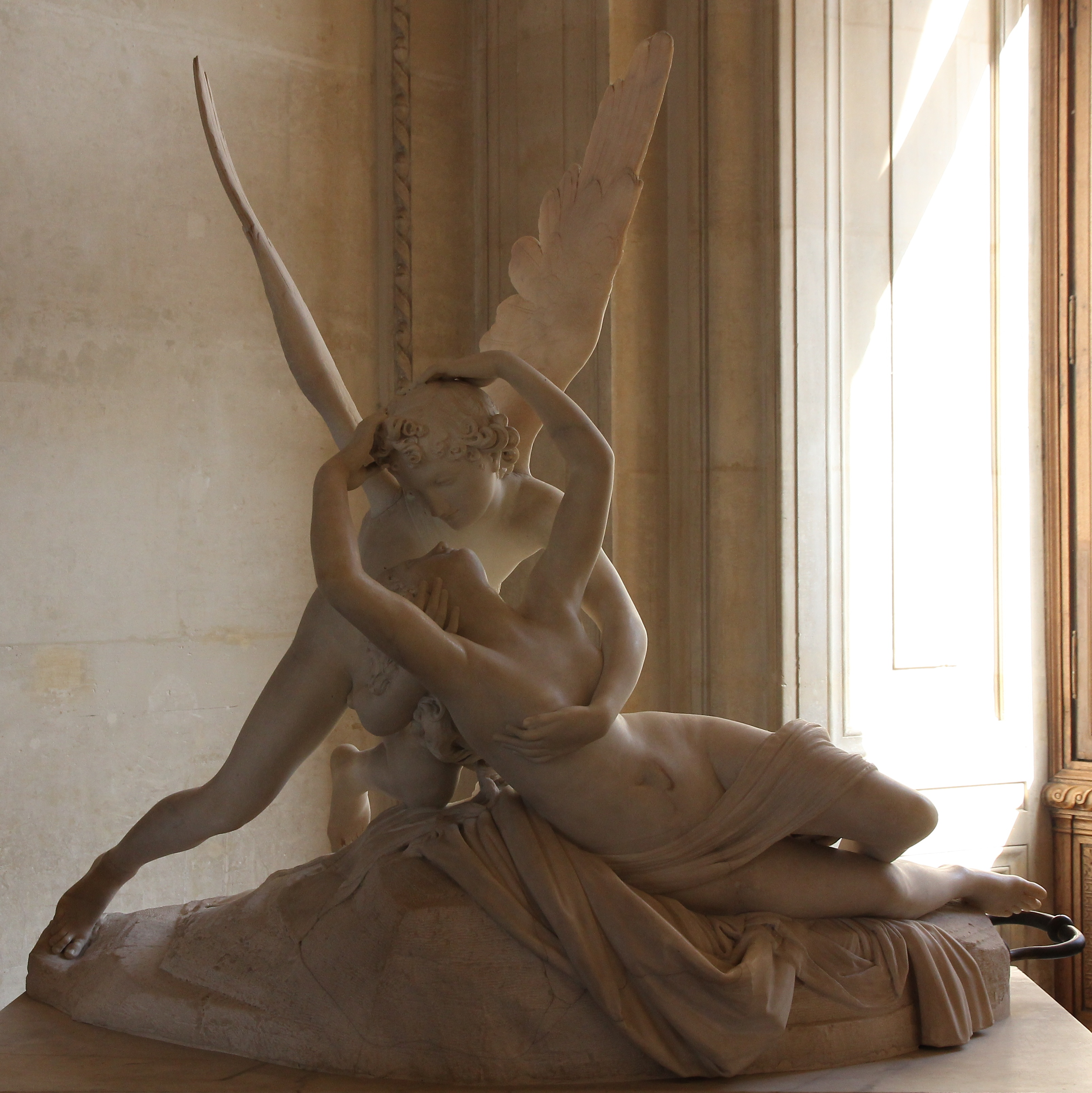
Antonio Canova's Psyche Revived by Cupid's Kiss was commissioned in 1787 and donated in 1824.

The museum opened on 10 August 1793, the first anniversary of the monarchy's demise, as Muséum central des Arts de la République. The public was given free access on three days per week, which was "perceived as a major accomplishment and was generally appreciated". The collection showcased 537 paintings and 184 objects of art. Three-quarters were derived from the royal collections, the remainder from confiscated émigrés and Church property (biens nationaux). To expand and organise the collection, the Republic dedicated 100,000 livres per year. In 1794, France's revolutionary armies began bringing pieces from Northern Europe, augmented after the Treaty of Tolentino (1797) by works from the Vatican, such as the Laocoön and Apollo Belvedere, to establish the Louvre as a museum and as a "sign of popular sovereignty".

Bertrand Clauzel then chief of staff to Emmanuel de Grouchy, serving in the Army of Italy, negotiated the abdication of the King of Sardinia in December 1798 from his mainland territories. To secure the agreement Clauzel returned with the Woman with Dropsy, a painting by the Dutch master Gerard Dou. Clauzel would donate it to the Louvre, making it the first donation in the museum's history.

The early days were hectic. Privileged artists continued to live in residence, and the unlabelled paintings hung "frame to frame from floor to ceiling". The museum closed in May 1796 due to structural deficiencies. It reopened on 14 July 1801, arranged chronologically and with new lighting and columns. On 15 August 1797, the Galerie d'Apollon was opened with an exhibition of drawings. Meanwhile, the Louvre's Gallery of Antiquity sculpture (musée des Antiques), with artefacts brought from Florence and the Vatican, had opened in November 1800 in Anne of Austria's former summer apartment, located on the ground floor just below the Galerie d'Apollon.

=== Napoleonic era ===
On 19 November 1802, Napoleon appointed Vivant Denon, a scholar and polymath who had participated in the Egyptian campaign of 1798–1801, as the museum's first director, in preference to alternative contenders such as antiquarian Ennio Quirino Visconti, painter Jacques-Louis David, sculptor Antonio Canova and architects Léon Dufourny or Pierre Fontaine. On Denon's suggestion in July 1803, the museum itself was renamed Musée Napoléon.

The collection grew through successful military campaigns. Acquisitions were made of Spanish, Austrian, Dutch, and Italian works, either as the result of war looting or formalised by treaties such as the Treaty of Tolentino. At the end of Napoleon's First Italian Campaign in 1797, the Treaty of Campo Formio was signed with Count Philipp von Cobenzl of the Austrian Monarchy. This treaty marked the completion of Napoleon's conquest of Italy and the end of the first phase of the French Revolutionary Wars. It compelled Italian cities to contribute pieces of art and heritage to Napoleon's "parades of spoils" through Paris before being put into the Louvre Museum. The Horses of Saint Mark, which had adorned the basilica of San Marco in Venice after the sack of Constantinople in 1204, were brought to Paris where they were placed atop Napoleon's Arc de Triomphe du Carrousel in 1797. Under the Treaty of Tolentino, the two statues of the Nile and Tiber were taken to Paris from the Vatican in 1797, and were both kept in the Louvre until 1815. (The Nile was later returned to Rome, whereas the Tiber has remained in the Louvre to this day.) The despoilment of Italian churches and palaces outraged the Italians and their artistic and cultural sensibilities.

After the French defeat at Waterloo, the looted works' former owners sought their return. The Louvre's administrator, Denon, was loath to comply in absence of a treaty of restitution. In response, foreign states sent emissaries to London to seek help, and many pieces were returned, though far from all. In 1815 Louis XVIII finally concluded agreements with the Austrian government for the keeping of works such as Veronese's Wedding at Cana which was exchanged for a large Le Brun or the repurchase of the Albani collection.

=== From 1815 to 1852 ===
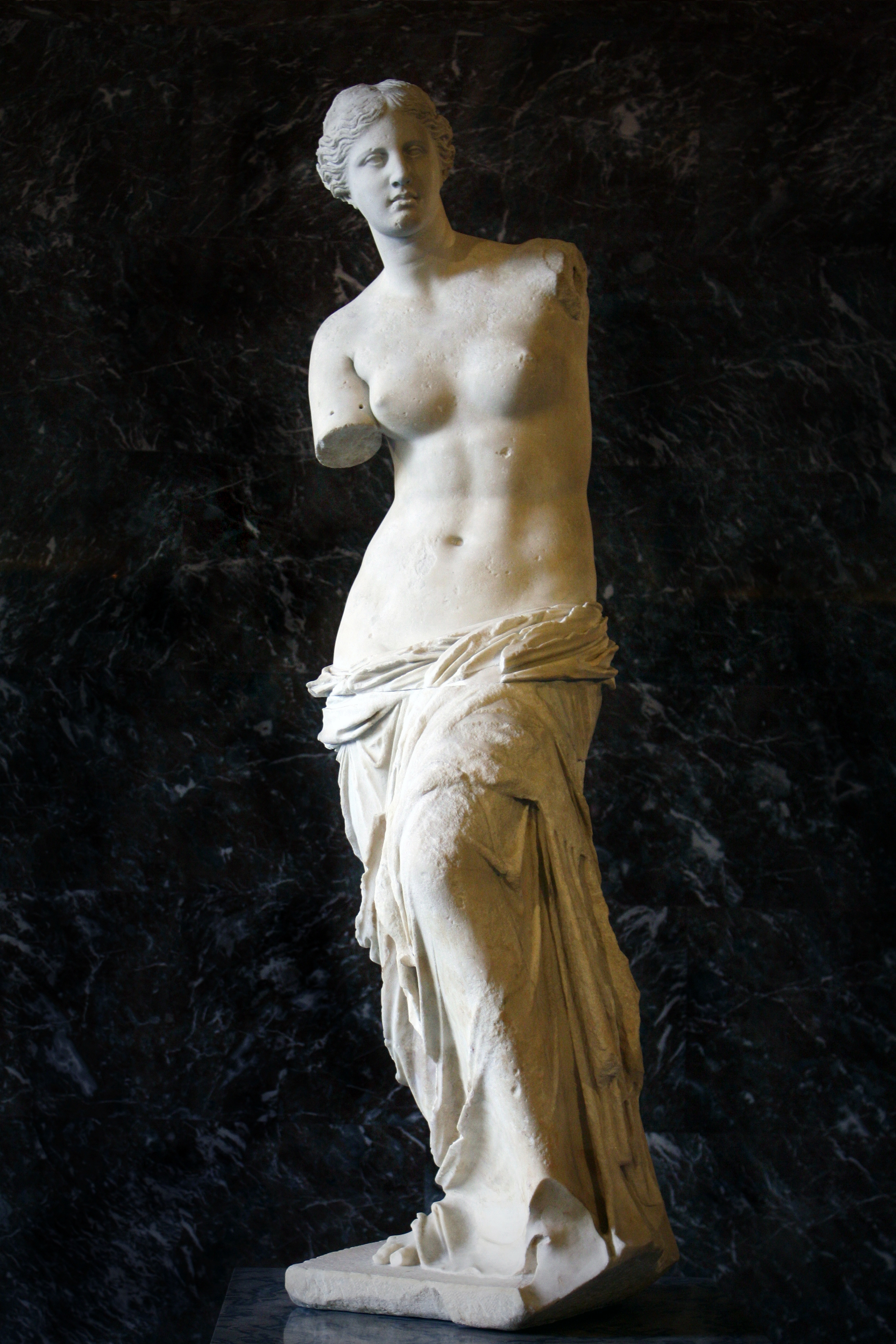
The Venus de Milo was added to the Louvre's collection during the reign of Louis XVIII.

For most of the 19th century, from Napoleon's time to the Second Empire, the Louvre and other national museums were managed under the monarch's civil list and thus depended much on the ruler's personal involvement. Whereas the most iconic collection remained that of paintings in the Grande Galerie, a number of other initiatives mushroomed in the vast building, named as if they were separate museums even though they were generally managed under the same administrative umbrella. Correspondingly, the museum complex was often referred to in the plural ("les musées du Louvre") rather than singular.

During the Bourbon Restoration (1814–1830), Louis XVIII and Charles X added to the collections. The Greek and Roman sculpture gallery on the ground floor of the southwestern side of the Cour Carrée was completed on designs by Percier and Fontaine. In 1819 an exhibition of manufactured products was opened in the first floor of the Cour Carrée's southern wing and would stay there until the mid-1820s. Charles X in 1826 created the Musée Égyptien and in 1827 included it in his broader Musée Charles X, a new section of the museum complex located in a suite of lavishly decorated rooms on the first floor of the South Wing of the Cour Carrée. The Egyptian collection, initially curated by Jean-François Champollion, formed the basis for what is now the Louvre's Department of Egyptian Antiquities. It was formed from the purchased collections of Edmé-Antoine Durand, Henry Salt and the second collection of Bernardino Drovetti (the first one having been purchased by Victor Emmanuel I of Sardinia to form the core of the present Museo Egizio in Turin). The Restoration period also saw the opening in 1824 of the Galerie d'Angoulême, a section of largely French sculptures on the ground floor of the Northwestern side of the Cour Carrée, many of whose artifacts came from the Palace of Versailles and from Alexandre Lenoir's Musée des Monuments Français following its closure in 1816. Meanwhile, the French Navy created an exhibition of ship models in the Louvre in December 1827, initially named musée dauphin in honour of Dauphin Louis Antoine, building on an 18th-century initiative of Henri-Louis Duhamel du Monceau. This collection, renamed musée naval in 1833 and later to develop into the Musée national de la Marine, was initially located on the first floor of the Cour Carrée's North Wing, and in 1838 moved up one level to the 2nd-floor attic, where it remained for more than a century.

Rooms of the Musée Charles X

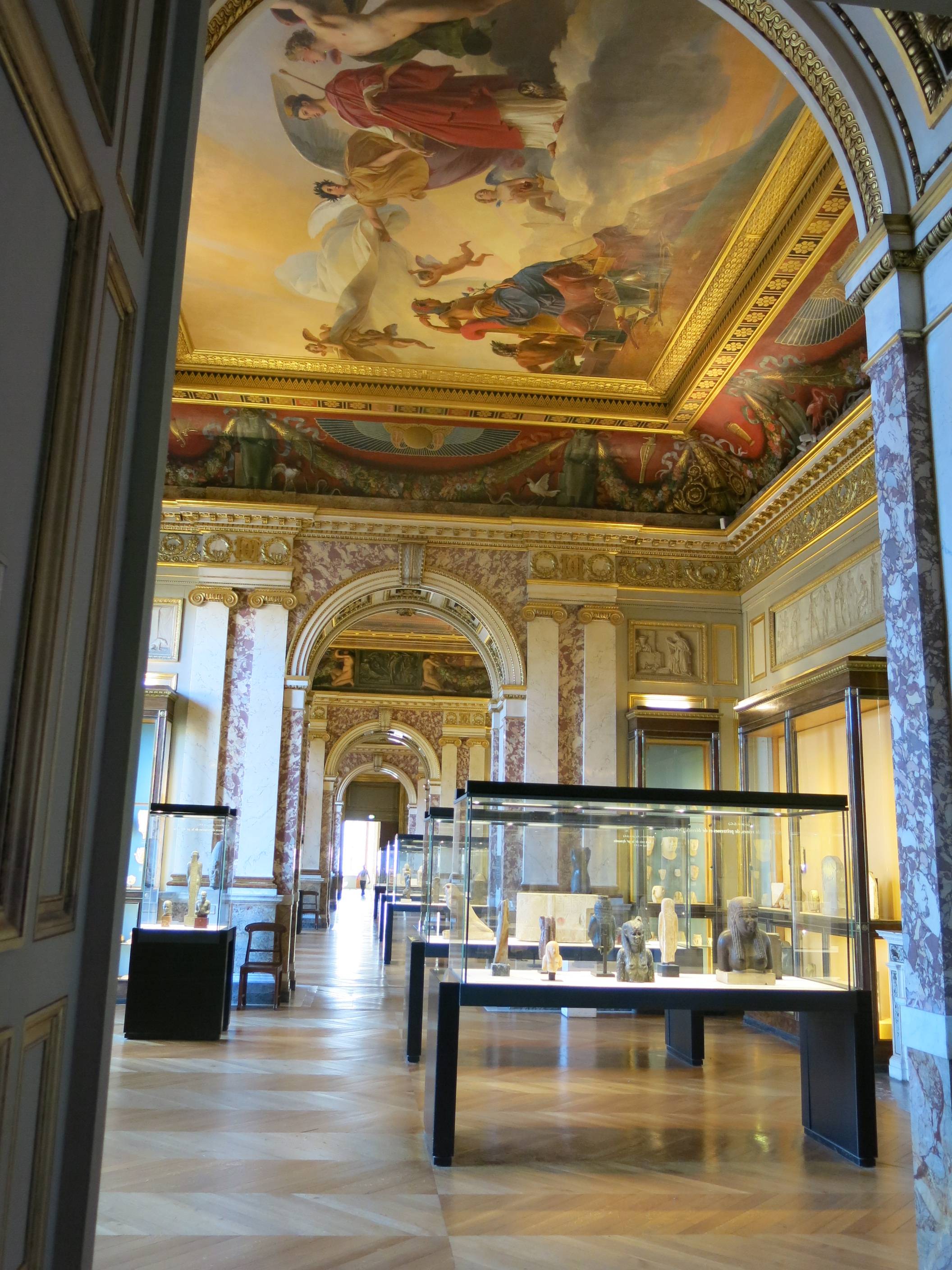
First room

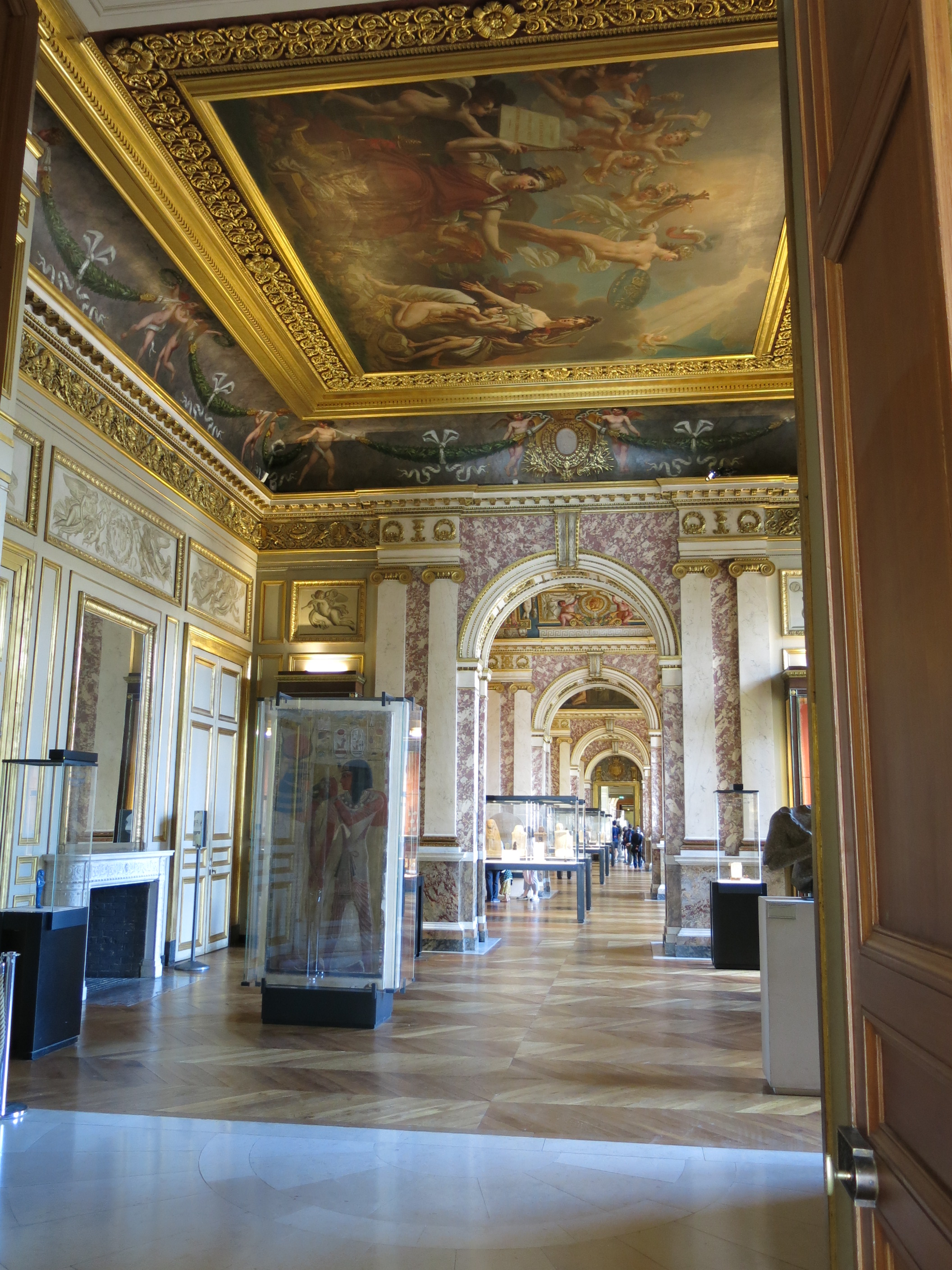
Room 27

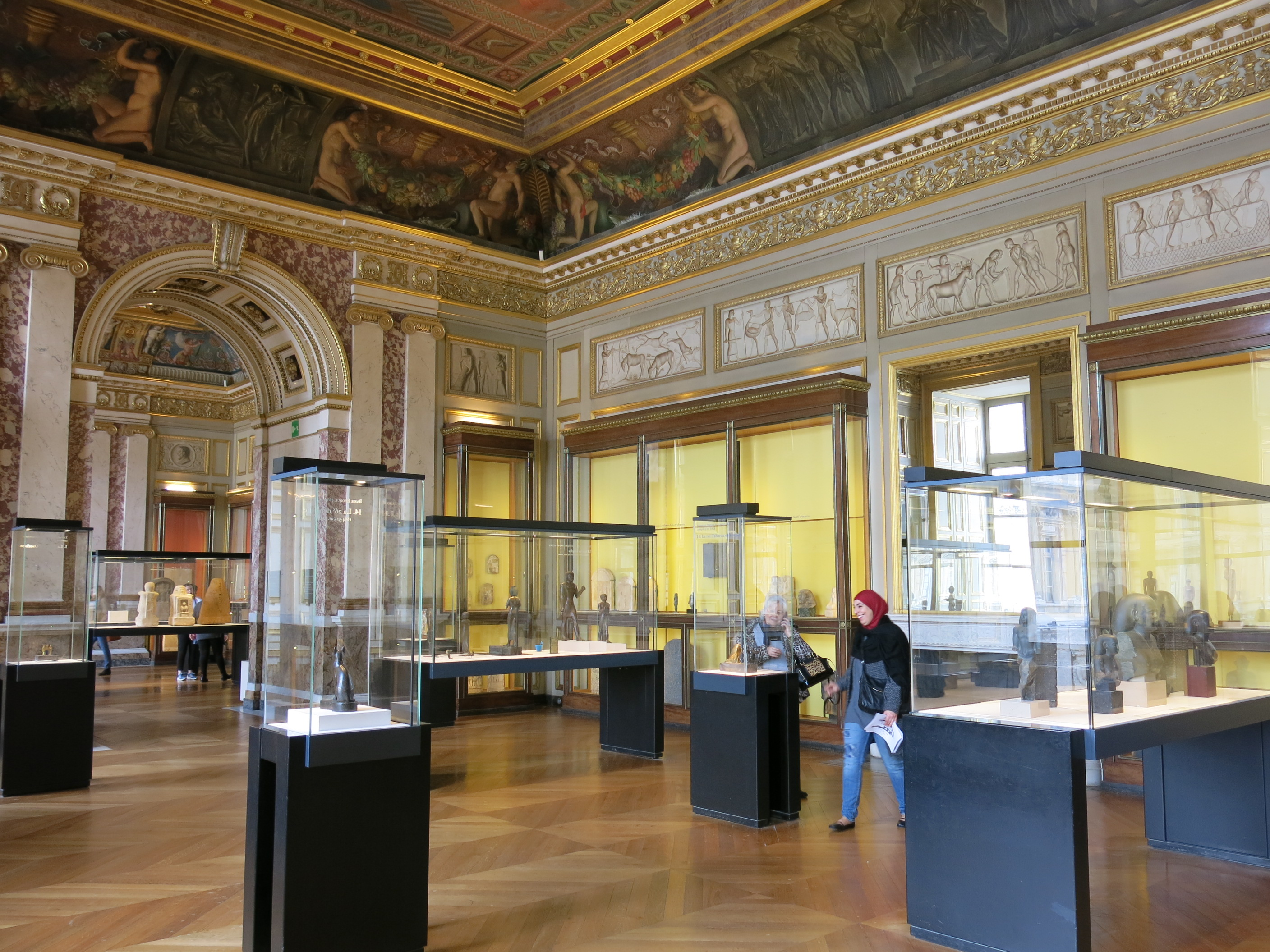
Room 29

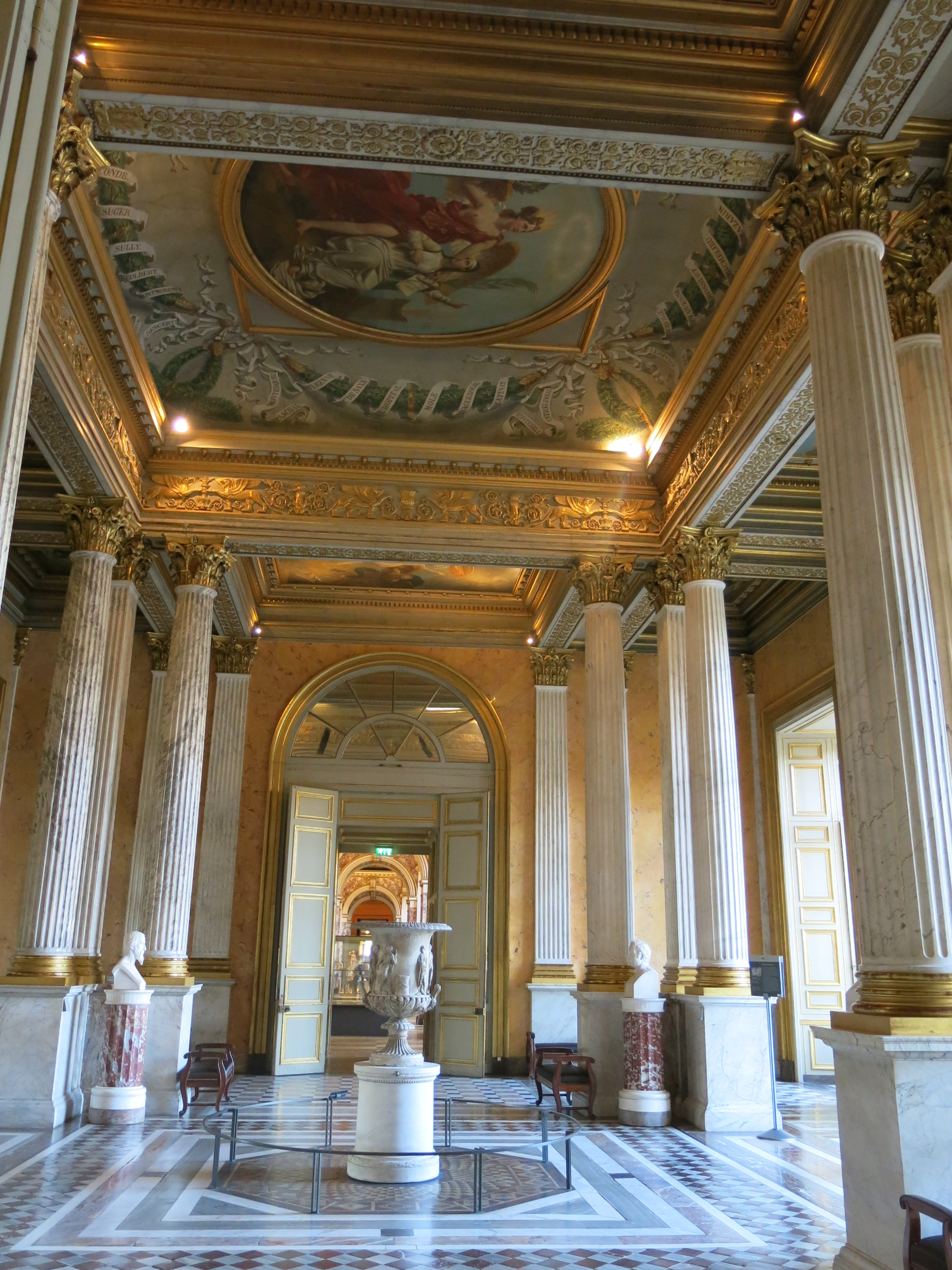
Salle des Colonnes

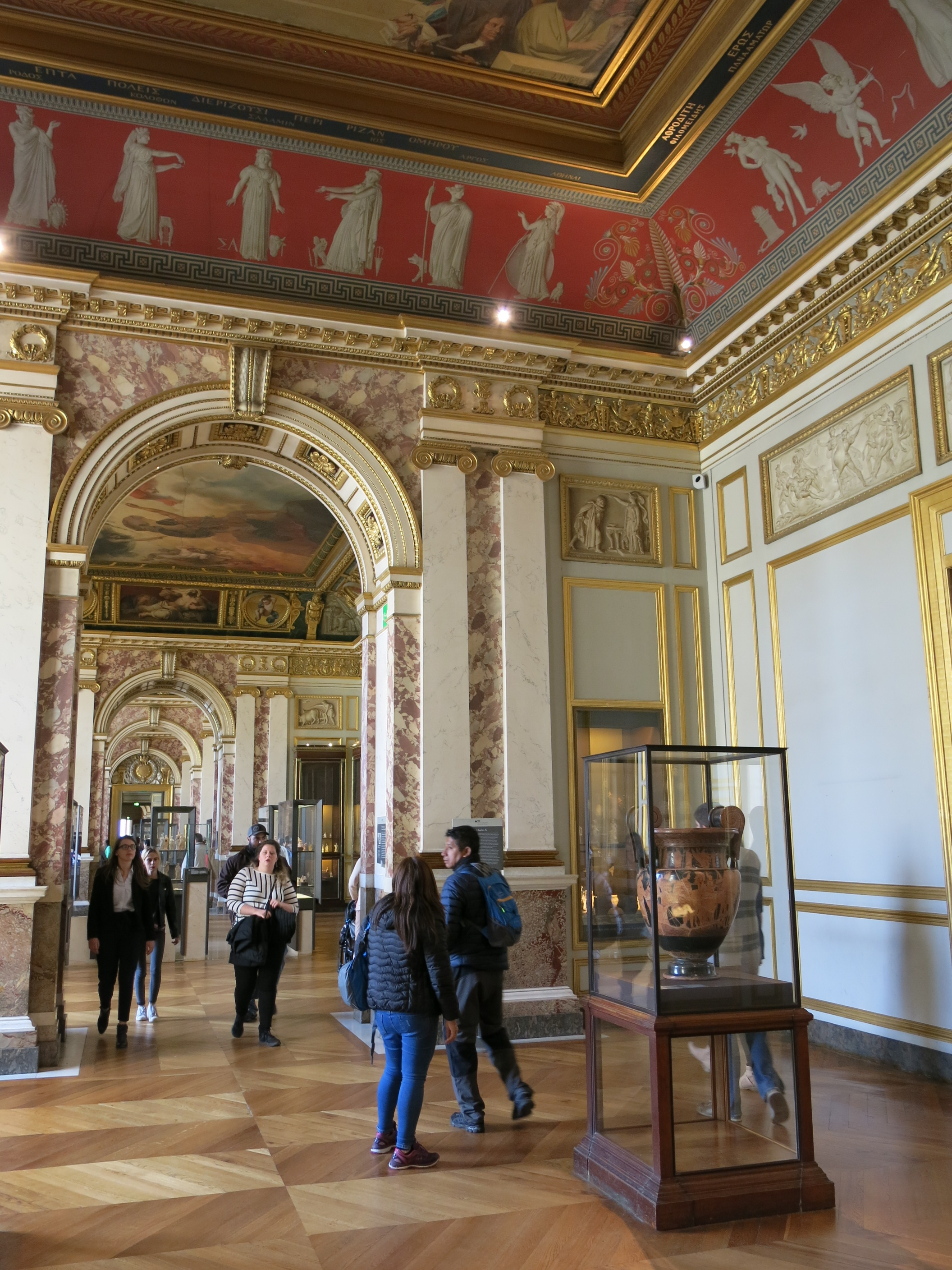
Room 35

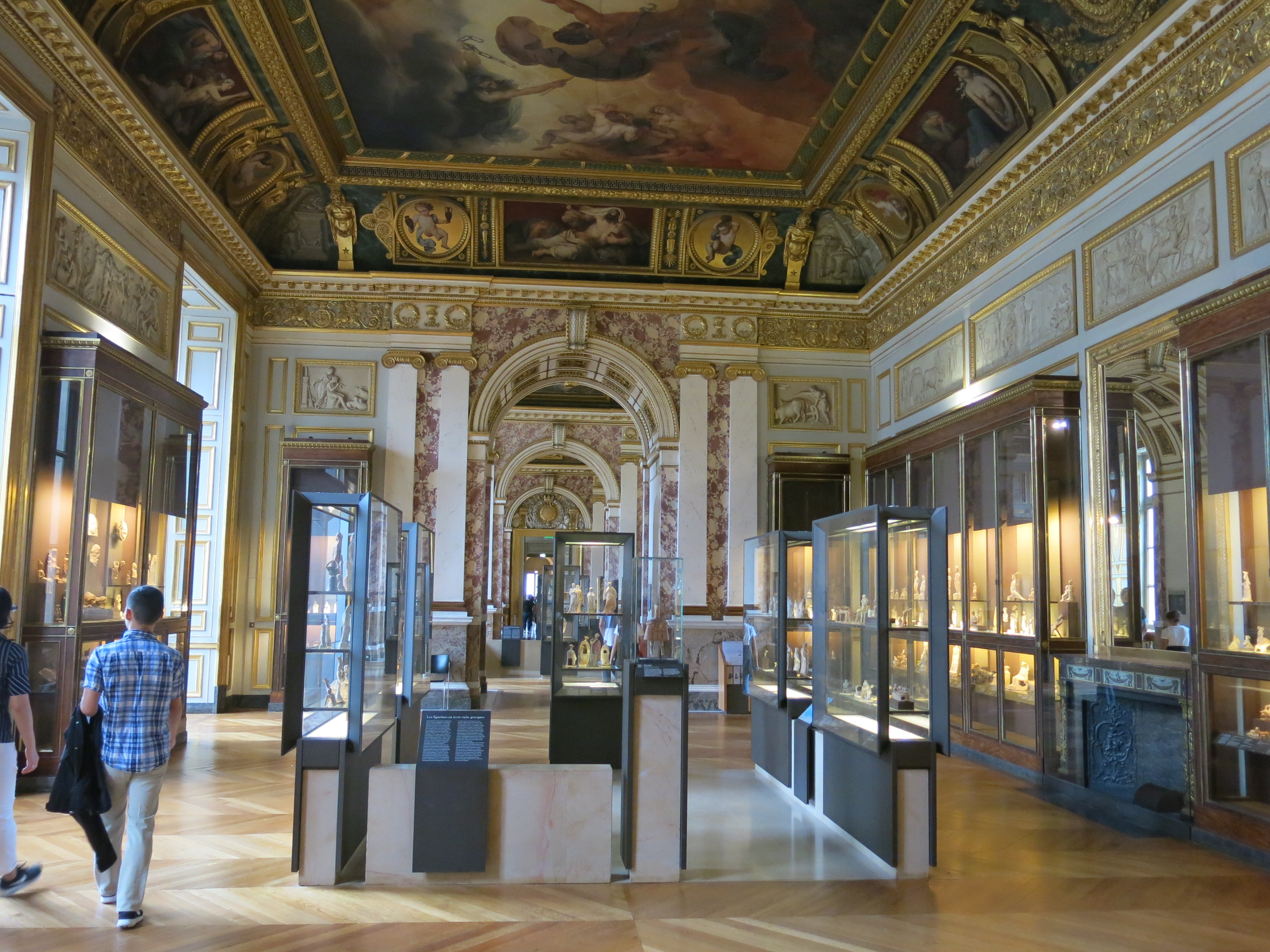
Room 36

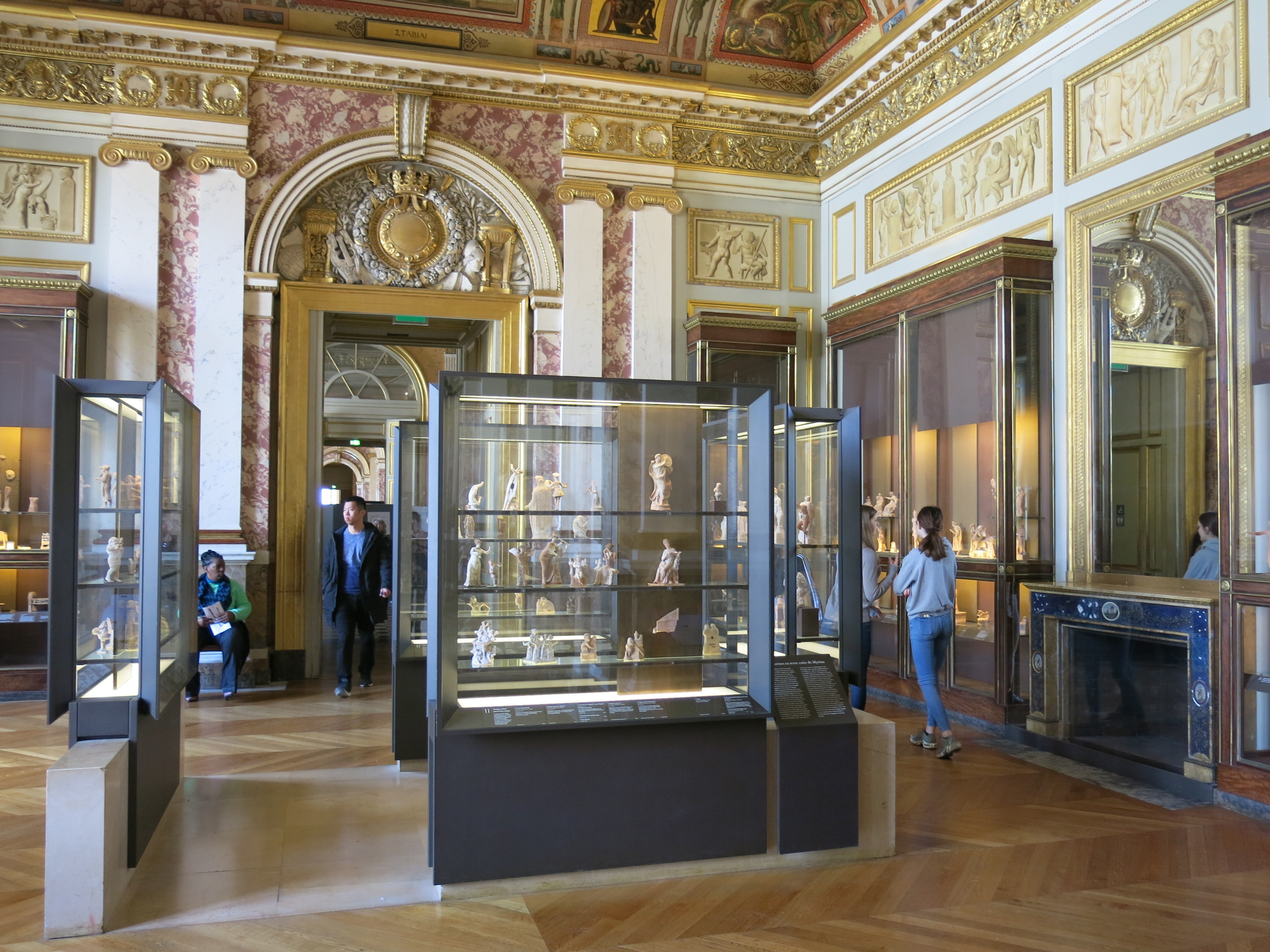
Room 38
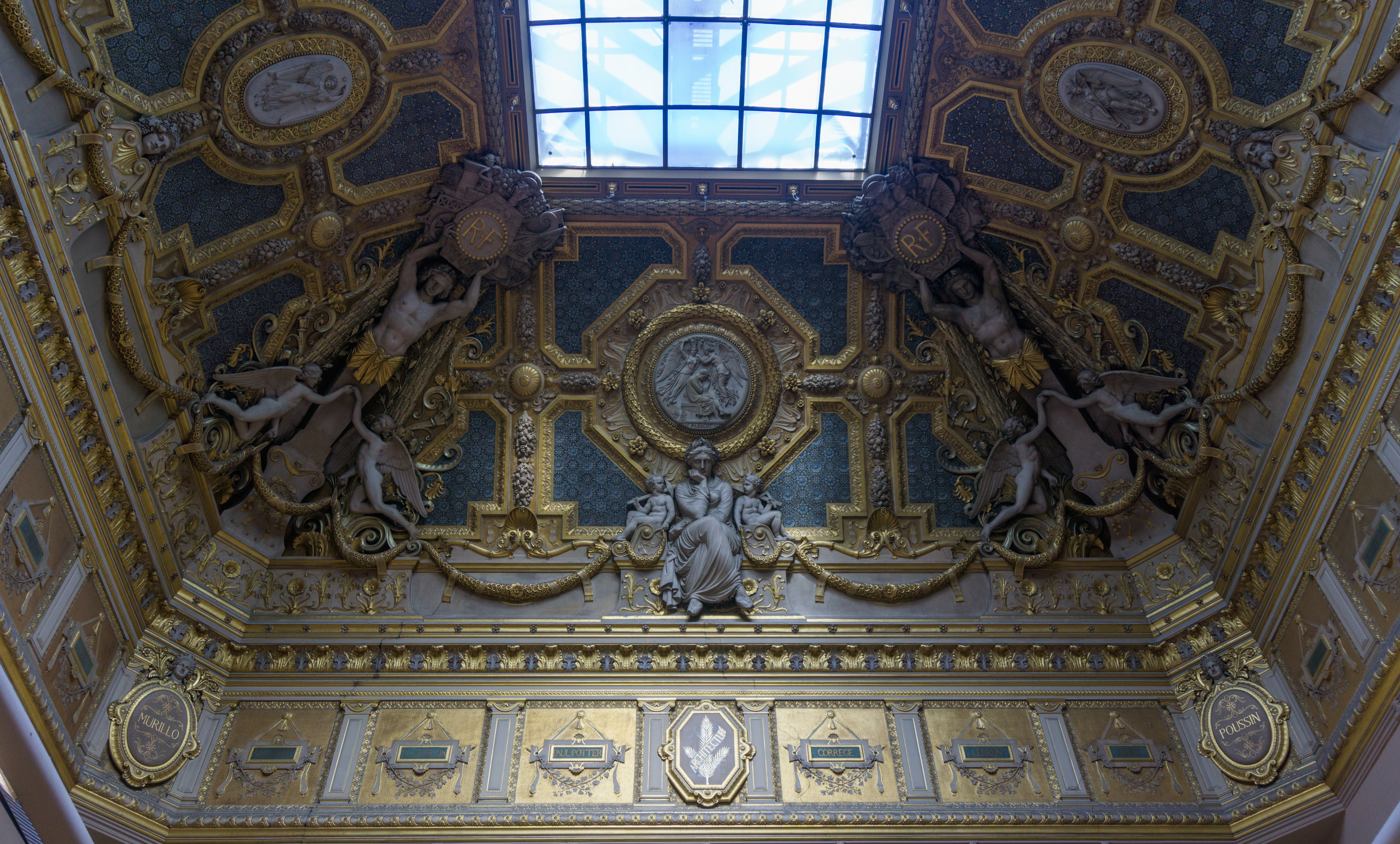
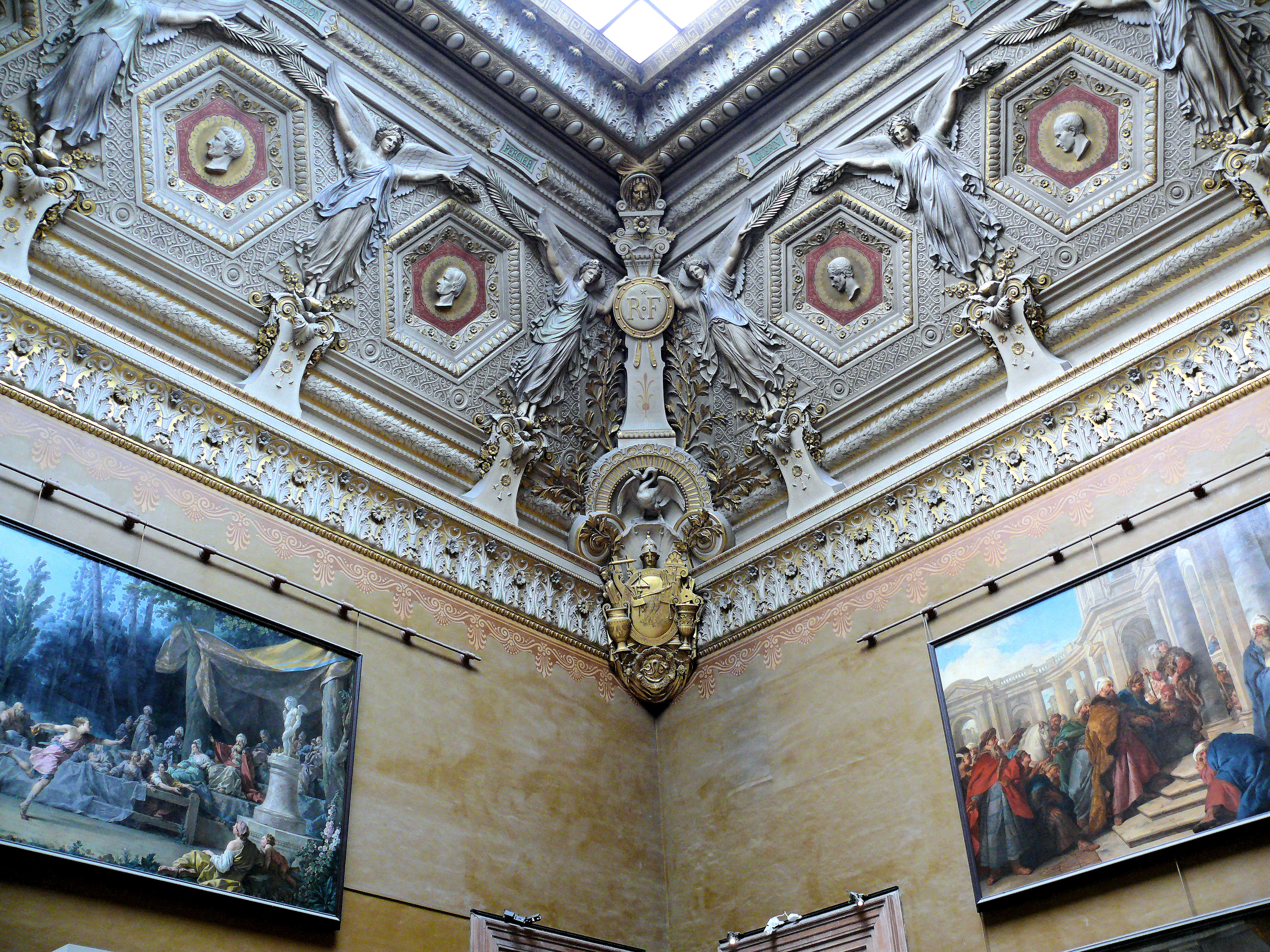
Ceiling decorations designed by Félix Duban in the Salon Carré (left) and Salle des Sept-Cheminées (right), late 1840s

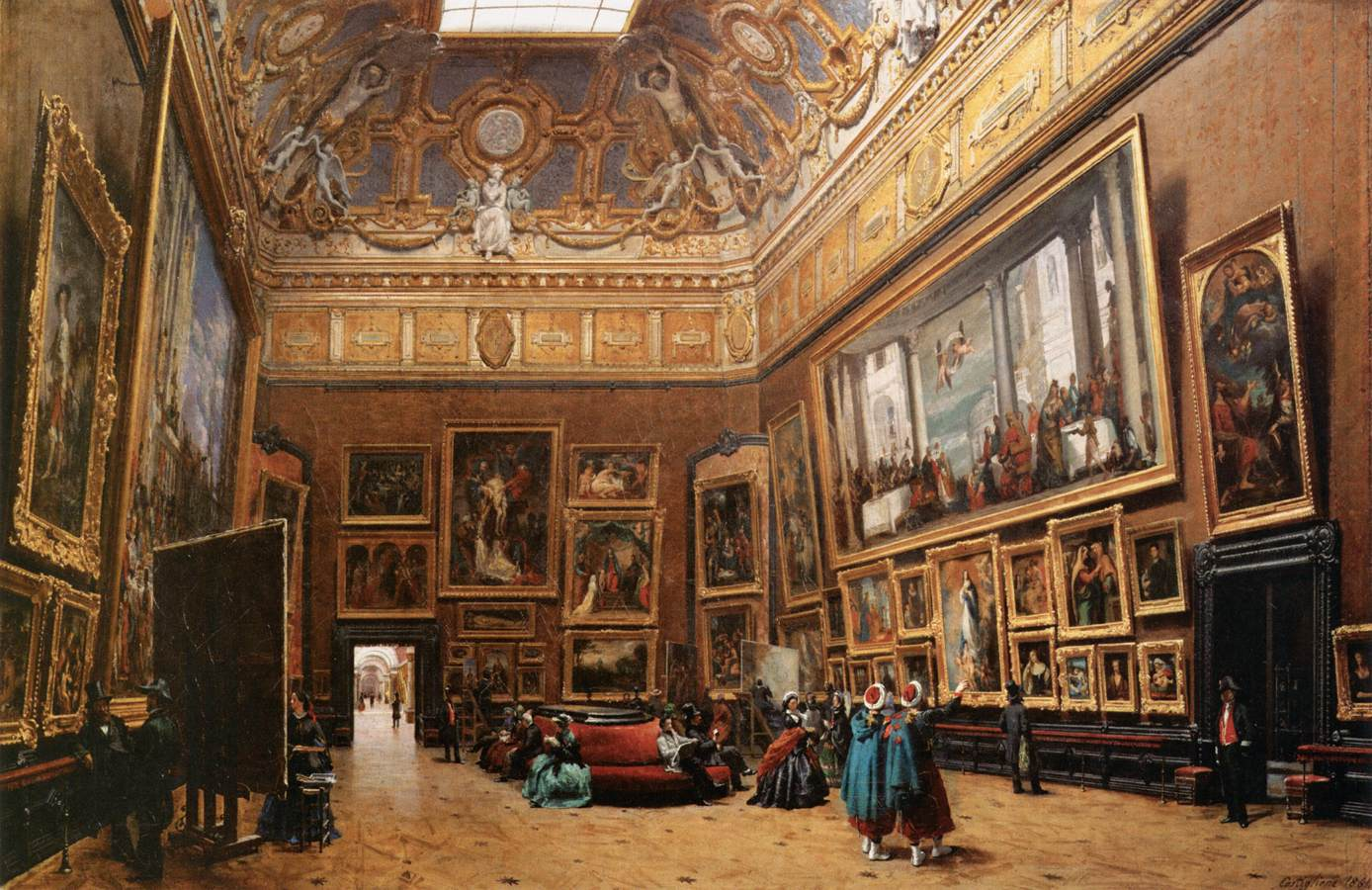
The display in the Salon Carré, painted by Giuseppe Castiglione in 1861 following its repurposing of the late 1840s Veronese's Wedding at Cana is visible on the left, and his Supper in the House of Simon (now at the Palace of Versailles) is on the right.

Following the July Revolution, King Louis Philippe focused his interest on the repurposing of the Palace of Versailles into a Museum of French History conceived as a project of national reconciliation, and the Louvre was kept in comparative neglect. Louis-Philippe did, however, sponsor the creation of the musée assyrien to host the monumental Assyrian sculpture works brought to Paris by Paul-Émile Botta, in the ground-floor gallery north of the eastern entrance of the Cour Carrée. The Assyrian Museum opened on 1 May 1847. Separately, Louis-Philippe had his Spanish gallery displayed in the Louvre from 7 January 1838, in five rooms on the first floor of the Cour Carrée's East (Colonnade) Wing, but the collection remained his personal property. As a consequence, the works were removed after Louis-Philippe was deposed in 1848, and were eventually auctioned away in 1853.

The short-lived Second Republic had more ambitions for the Louvre. It initiated repair work, the completion of the Galerie d'Apollon and of the salle des sept-cheminées, and the overhaul of the Salon Carré (former site of the iconic yearly Salon) and of the Grande Galerie. In 1848, the Naval Museum in the Cour Carrée's attic was brought under the common Louvre Museum management, a change which was again reversed in 1920. In 1850 under the leadership of curator Adrien de Longpérier, the musée mexicain opened within the Louvre as the first European museum dedicated to pre-Columbian art.

=== Second Empire ===
The rule of Napoleon III was transformational for the Louvre, both the building and the museum. In 1852, he created the Musée des Souverains in the Colonnade Wing, an ideological project aimed at buttressing his personal legitimacy. In 1861, he bought 11,835 artworks including 641 paintings, Greek gold and other antiquities of the Campana collection. For its display, he created another new section within the Louvre named Musée Napoléon III, occupying a number of rooms in various parts of the building. Between 1852 and 1870, the museum added 20,000 new artefacts to its collections.

The main change of that period was to the building itself. In the 1850s architects Louis Visconti and Hector Lefuel created massive new spaces around what is now called the Cour Napoléon, some of which (in the South Wing, now Aile Denon) went to the museum. In the 1860s, Lefuel also led the creation of the pavillon des Sessions with a new Salle des Etats closer to Napoleon III's residence in the Tuileries Palace, with the effect of shortening the Grande Galerie by about a third of its previous length. A smaller but significant Second Empire project was the decoration of the salle des Empereurs below the Salon carré.

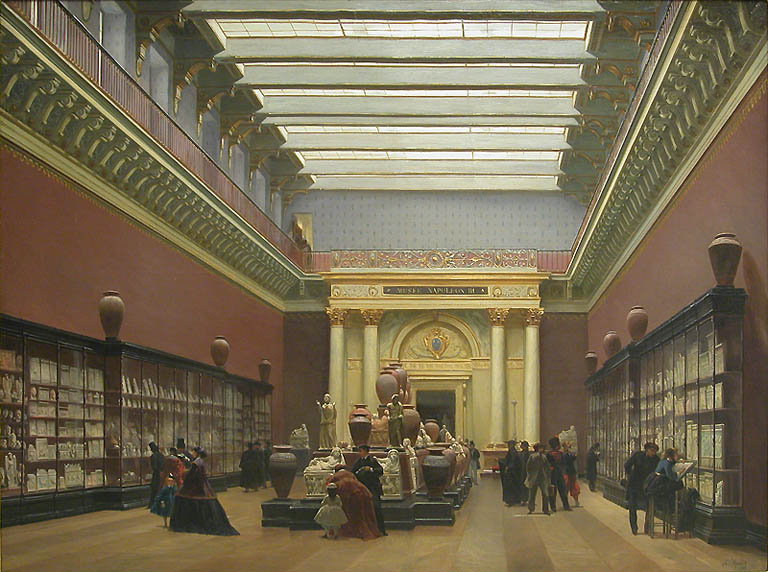
Entrance to a section of the Musée Napoléon III from the salle des séances, then a double-height space

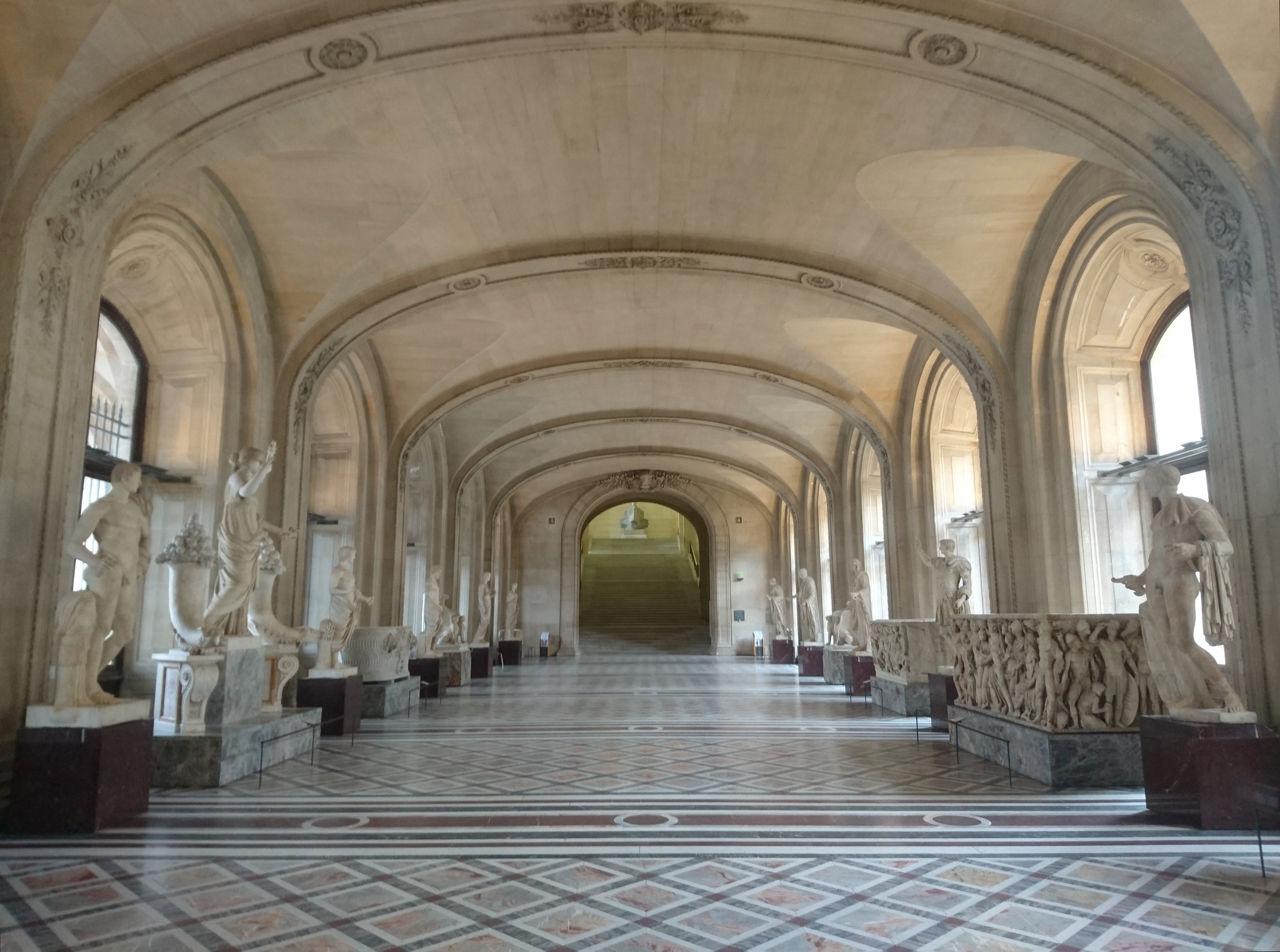
Galerie Daru, part of the New Louvre building program under Napoleon III

Salle Daru above the galerie Daru, also created under Napoleon III

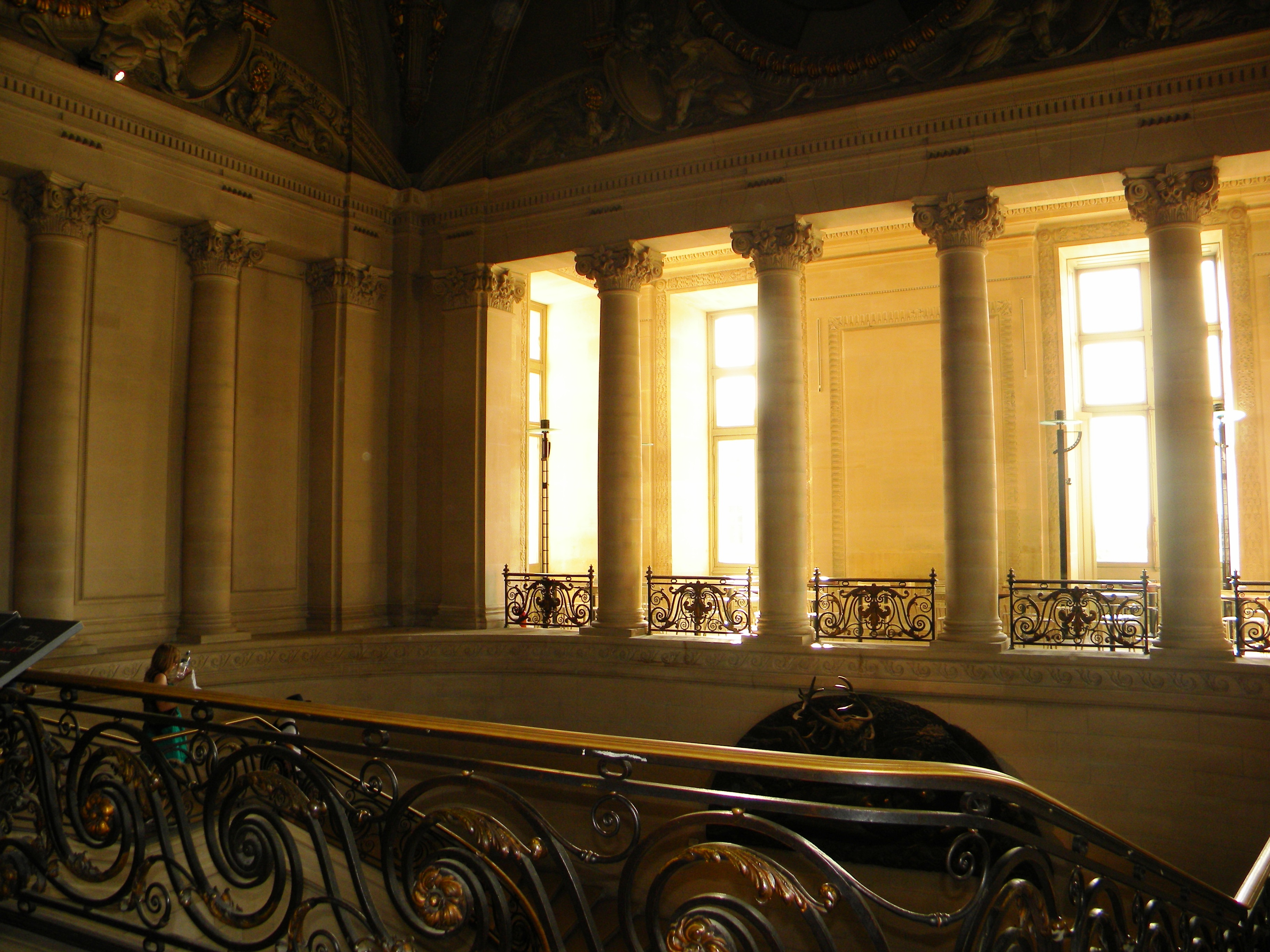
Escalier Mollien in the New Louvre

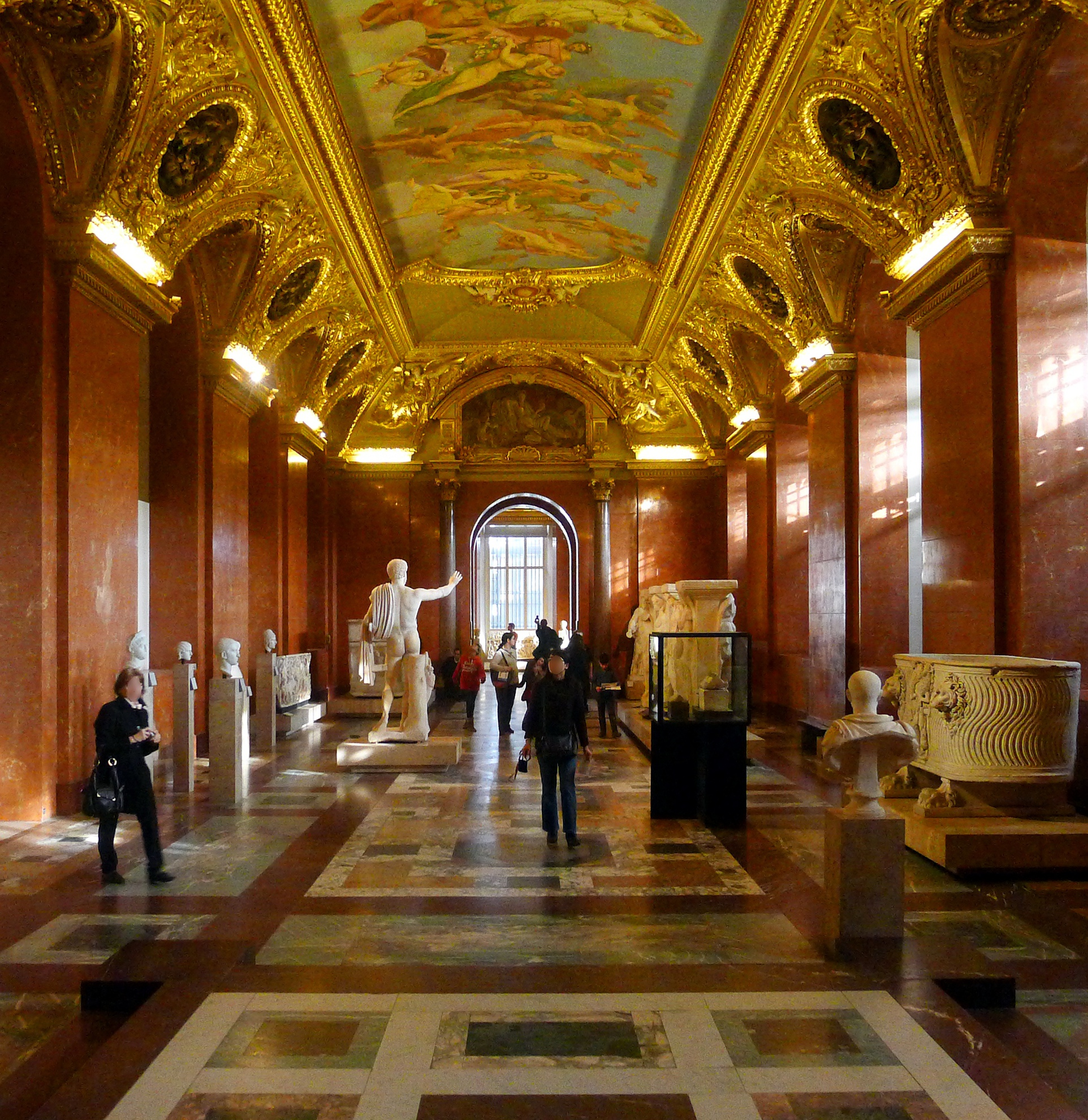
Salle des Empereurs

=== From 1870 to 1981 ===
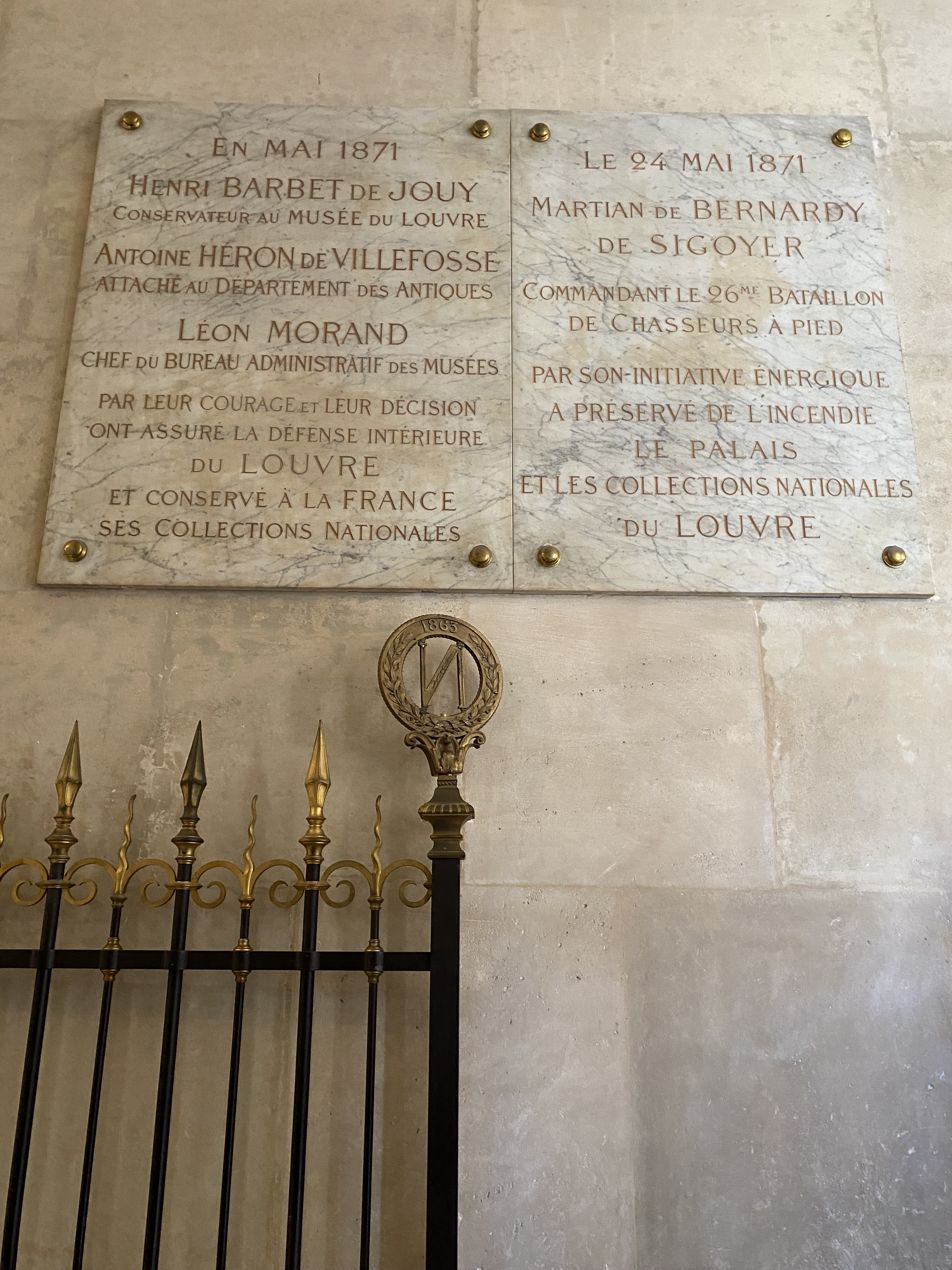
Memorial plaques honouring the Louvre's defenders in May 1871

The Louvre narrowly escaped serious damage during the suppression of the Paris Commune. On 23 May 1871, as the French Army advanced into Paris, a force of Communards led by Jules Bergeret set fire to the adjoining Tuileries Palace. The fire burned for forty-eight hours, entirely destroying the interior of the Tuileries and spreading to the north west wing of the museum next to it. The emperor's Louvre library (Bibliothèque du Louvre) and some of the adjoining halls, in what is now the Richelieu Wing, were separately destroyed. But the museum was saved by the efforts of Paris firemen and museum employees led by curator Henry Barbet de Jouy.

Following the end of the monarchy, several spaces in the Louvre's South Wing went to the museum. The Salle du Manège was transferred to the museum in 1879, and in 1928 became its main entrance lobby. The large Salle des Etats that had been created by Lefuel between the Grande Galerie and Pavillon Denon was redecorated in 1886 by Edmond Guillaume, Lefuel's successor as architect of the Louvre, and opened as a spacious exhibition room. Edomond Guillaume also decorated the first-floor room at the northwest corner of the Cour Carrée, on the ceiling of which he placed in 1890 a monumental painting by Carolus-Duran, The Triumph of Marie de' Medici originally created in 1879 for the Luxembourg Palace.

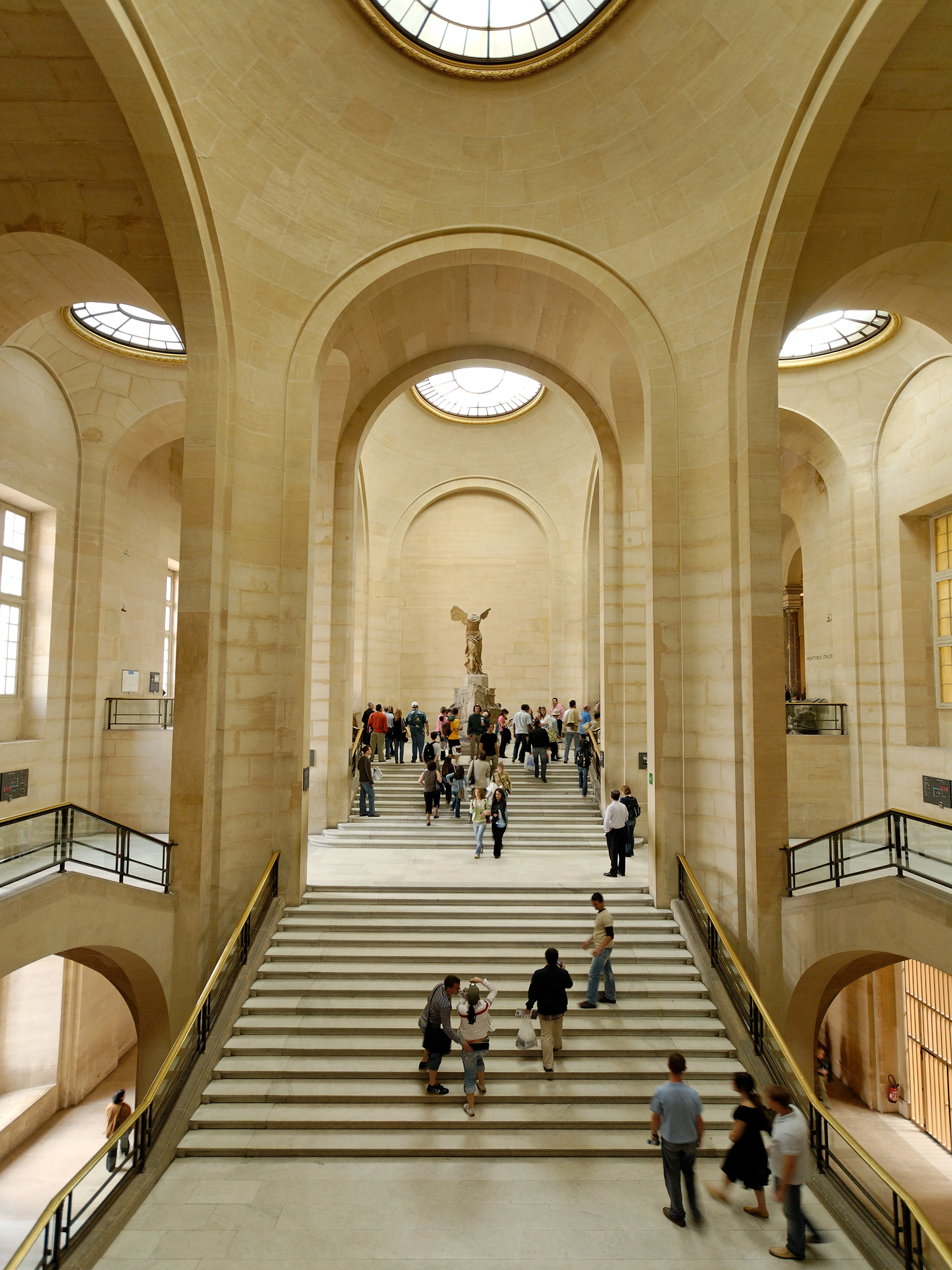
The Louvre's monumental Escalier Daru, topped by the Winged Victory of Samothrace, took its current appearance in the early 1930s.

Meanwhile, during the Third Republic (1870–1940) the Louvre acquired new artefacts mainly via donations, gifts, and sharing arrangements on excavations abroad. The 583-item Collection La Caze, donated in 1869 by Louis La Caze, included works by Chardin; Fragonard, Rembrandt and Watteau. In 1883, the Winged Victory of Samothrace, which had been found in the Aegean Sea in 1863, was prominently displayed as the focal point of the Escalier Daru. Major artefacts excavated at Susa in Iran, including the massive Apadana capital and glazed brick decoration from the Palace of Darius there, accrued to the Oriental (Near Eastern) Antiquities Department in the 1880s. The Société des amis du Louvre was established in 1897 and donated prominent works, such as the Pietà of Villeneuve-lès-Avignon. The expansion of the museum and its collections slowed after World War I, however, despite some prominent acquisitions such as Georges de La Tour's Saint Thomas and Baron Edmond de Rothschild's 1935 donation of 4,000 prints, 3,000 drawings, and 500 illustrated books.

From the late 19th century, the Louvre gradually veered away from its mid-century ambition of universality to become a more focused museum of French, Western and Near Eastern art, covering a space ranging from Iran to the Atlantic. The collections of the Louvre's musée mexicain were transferred to the Musée d'Ethnographie du Trocadéro in 1887. As the Musée de Marine was increasingly constrained to display its core naval-themed collections in the limited space it had in the second-floor attic of the northern half of the Cour Carrée, many of its significant holdings of non-Western artefacts were transferred in 1905 to the Trocadéro ethnography museum, the National Antiquities Museum in Saint-Germain-en-Laye, and the Chinese Museum in the Palace of Fontainebleau. The Musée de Marine itself was relocated to the Palais de Chaillot in 1943. The Louvre's extensive collections of Asian art were moved to the Guimet Museum in 1945. Nevertheless, the Louvre's first gallery of Islamic art opened in 1893.

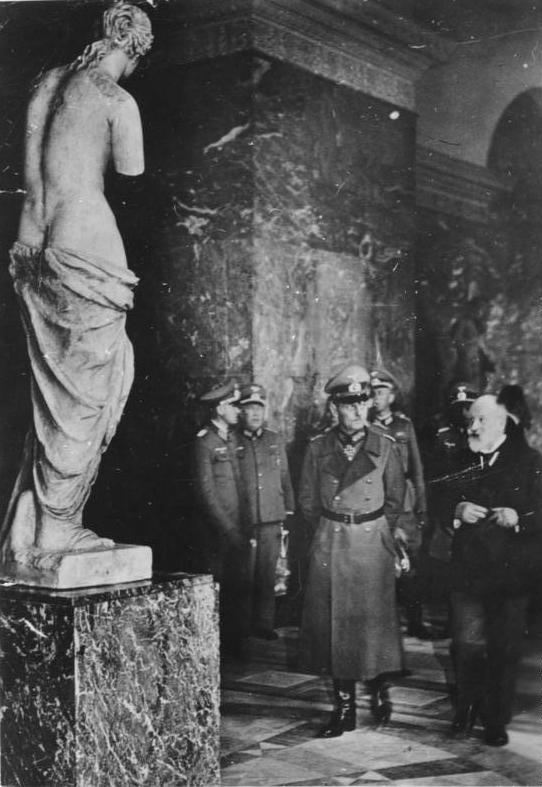
Generalfeldmarschall Gerd von Rundstedt is seen with a plaster model of the Venus de Milo, while visiting the Louvre with the curator Alfred Merlin on 7 October 1940.

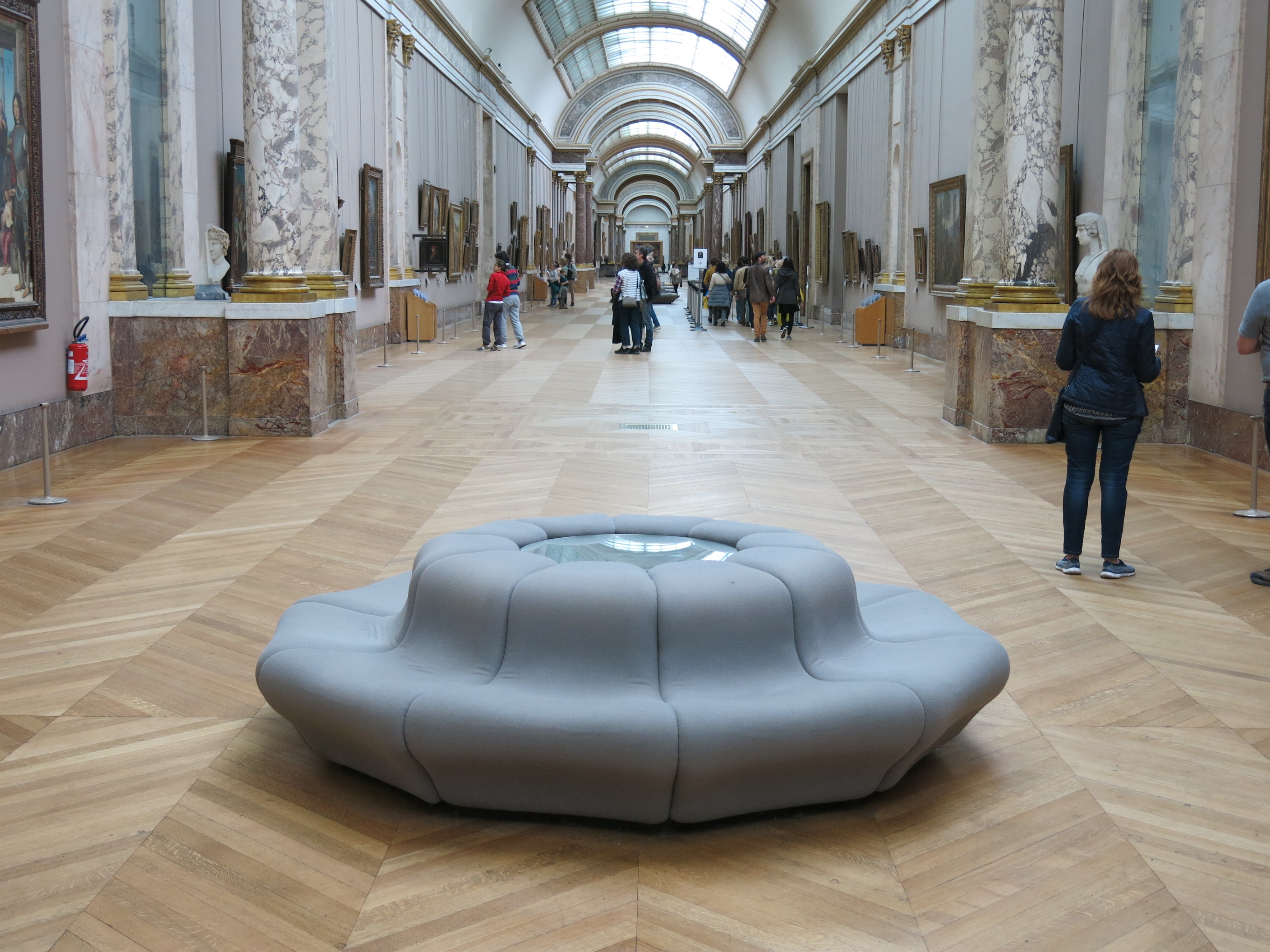
Seating designed by Pierre Paulin in the late 1960s, Grande Galerie

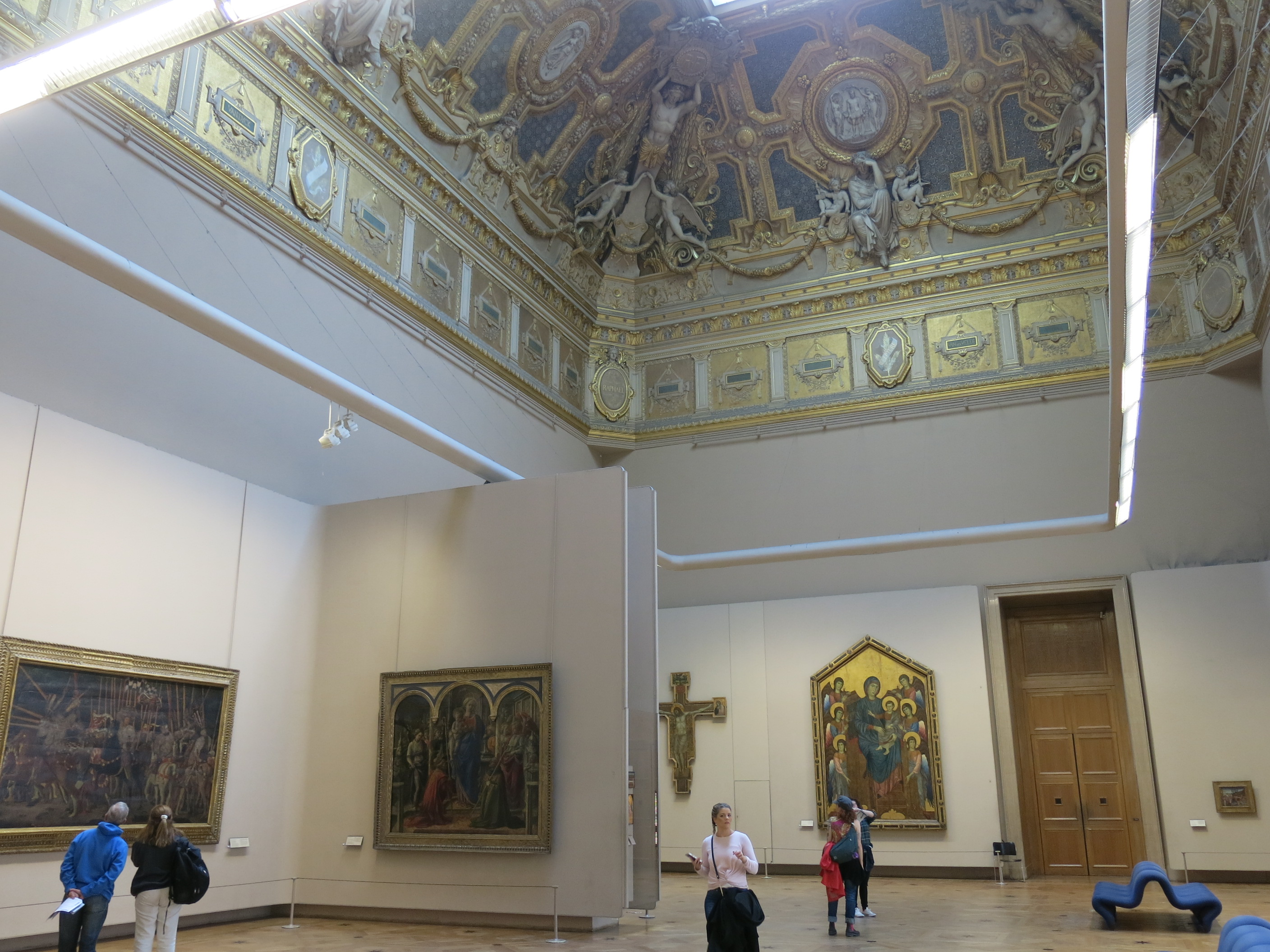
Marc Saltet's 1972 museography for the Salon Carré, with "dos-à-dos" seat designed in 1967 by Pierre Paulin

In the late 1920s, Louvre Director Henri Verne devised a master plan for the rationalisation of the museum's exhibitions, which was partly implemented in the following decade. In 1932–1934, Louvre architects Camille Lefèvre and Albert Ferran redesigned the Escalier Daru to its current appearance. The Cour du Sphinx in the South Wing was covered by a glass roof in 1934. Decorative arts exhibits were expanded in the first floor of the North Wing of the Cour Carrée, including some of France's first period room displays. In the late 1930s, The La Caze donation was moved to a remodelled Salle La Caze above the salle des Caryatides, with reduced height to create more rooms on the second floor and a sober interior design by Albert Ferran.

During World War II, the Louvre conducted an elaborate plan of evacuation of its art collection. When Germany occupied the Sudetenland, many important artworks such as the Mona Lisa were temporarily moved to the Château de Chambord. When war was formally declared a year later, most of the museum's paintings were sent there as well. Select sculptures such as Winged Victory of Samothrace and the Venus de Milo were sent to the Château de Valençay. On 27 August 1939, after two days of packing, truck convoys began to leave Paris. By 28 December, the museum was cleared of most works, except those that were too heavy and "unimportant paintings [that] were left in the basement". In early 1945, after the liberation of France, art began returning to the Louvre.

New arrangements after the war revealed the further evolution of taste away from the lavish decorative practices of the late 19th century. In 1947, Edmond Guillaume's ceiling ornaments were removed from the Salle des Etats, where the Mona Lisa was first displayed in 1966. Around 1950, Louvre architect Jean-Jacques Haffner streamlined the interior decoration of the Grande Galerie. In 1953, a new ceiling by Georges Braque was inaugurated in the Salle Henri II, next to the Salle La Caze. In the late 1960s, seats designed by Pierre Paulin were installed in the Grande Galerie. In 1972, the Salon Carré's museography was remade with lighting from a hung tubular case, designed by Louvre architect Marc Saltet with assistance from designers André Monpoix, Joseph-André Motte and Paulin.

In 1961, the Finance Ministry accepted to leave the Pavillon de Flore at the southwestern end of the Louvre building, as Verne had recommended in his 1920s plan. New exhibition spaces of sculptures (ground floor) and paintings (first floor) opened there later in the 1960s, on a design by government architect Olivier Lahalle.

=== Grand Louvre ===
In 1981, French President François Mitterrand proposed, as one of his Grands Projets, the Grand Louvre plan to relocate the Finance Ministry, until then housed in the North Wing of the Louvre, and thus devote almost the entire Louvre building (except its northwestern tip, which houses the separate Musée des Arts Décoratifs) to the museum which would be correspondingly restructured. In 1984 I. M. Pei, the architect personally selected by Mitterrand, proposed a master plan including an underground entrance space accessed through a glass pyramid in the Louvre's central Cour Napoléon.

The open spaces surrounding the pyramid were inaugurated on 15 October 1988, and its underground lobby was opened on 30 March 1989. New galleries of early modern French paintings on the 2nd floor of the Cour Carrée, for which the planning had started before the Grand Louvre, also opened in 1989. Further rooms in the same sequence, designed by Italo Rota, opened on 15 December 1992.

On 18 November 1993, Mitterrand inaugurated the next major phase of the Grand Louvre plan: the renovated North (Richelieu) Wing in the former Finance Ministry site, the museum's largest single expansion in its entire history, designed by Pei, his French associate Michel Macary, and Jean-Michel Wilmotte. Further underground spaces known as the Carrousel du Louvre, centred on the Inverted Pyramid and designed by Pei and Macary, had opened in October 1993. Other refurbished galleries, of Italian sculptures and Egyptian antiquities, opened in 1994. The third and last main phase of the plan unfolded mainly in 1997, with new renovated rooms in the Sully and Denon wings. A new entrance at the porte des Lions opened in 1998, leading on the first floor to new rooms of Spanish paintings.

As of 2002, the Louvre's visitor count had doubled from its pre-Grand-Louvre levels.

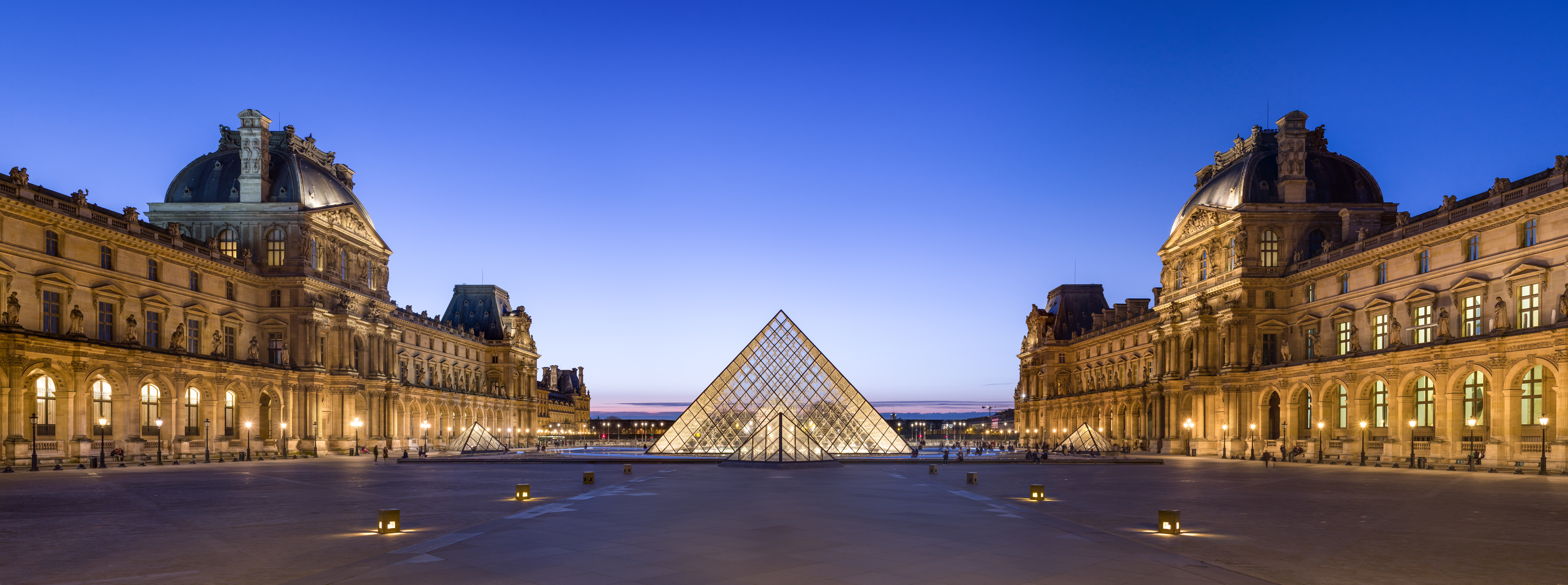
The Napoleon Courtyard and Ieoh Ming Pei's pyramid in its centre, at dusk

The Louvre Palace and the pyramid (by day)

=== 21st century ===
President Jacques Chirac, who had succeeded Mitterrand in 1995, insisted on the return of non-Western art to the Louvre, upon a recommendation from his friend the art collector and dealer Jacques Kerchache. On his initiative, a selection of highlights from the collections of what would become the Musée du Quai Branly – Jacques Chirac was installed on the ground floor of the Pavillon des Sessions and opened in 2000, six years ahead of the Musée du Quai Branly itself.

The main other initiative in the aftermath of the Grand Louvre project was Chirac's decision to create a new department of Islamic Art, by executive order of 1 August 2003, and to move the corresponding collections from their prior underground location in the Richelieu Wing to a more prominent site in the Denon Wing. That new section opened on 22 September 2012, together with collections from the Roman-era Eastern Mediterranean, with financial support from the Al Waleed bin Talal Foundation and on a design by Mario Bellini and Rudy Ricciotti.

In 2007, German painter Anselm Kiefer was invited to create a work for the North stairs of the Perrault Colonnade, Athanor. This decision announces the museum's reengagement with contemporary art under the direction of Henri Loyrette, fifty years after the institution's last order to a contemporary artists, George Braque.

In 2009, the Louvre collaborated with Japanese manga artist Hirohiko Araki, the creator of the long-running series JoJo's Bizarre Adventure, as part of its "The Louvre Invites Comic-Strip Art" (Le Louvre invite la bande dessinée) initiative. Araki created a full-color, standalone graphic novel titled Rohan at the Louvre (Rohan au Louvre), featuring his recurring JoJo character Rohan Kishibe, a manga artist who travels to the museum to investigate a cursed painting. The original artwork from the project was displayed at the museum from January to April 2009 alongside works by other international comic creators, and the comic was later published officially by the Louvre's publishing arm.

In 2010, American painter Cy Twombly completed a new ceiling for the Salle des Bronzes (the former Salle La Caze), a counterpoint to that of Braque installed in 1953 in the adjacent Salle Henri II. The room's floor and walls were redesigned in 2021 by Louvre architect Michel Goutal to revert the changes made by his predecessor Albert Ferran in the late 1930s, triggering protests from the Cy Twombly Foundation on grounds that the then-deceased painter's work had been created to fit with the room's prior decoration.

That same year, the Louvre commissioned French artist François Morellet to create a work for the Lefuel stairs, on the first floor. For L'esprit d'escalier Morellet redesigned the stairscase's windows, echoing their original structures but distorting them to create a disturbing optical effect.

On 6 June 2014, the Decorative Arts section on the first floor of the Cour Carrée's northern wing opened after comprehensive refurbishment.

In January 2020, under the direction of Jean-Luc Martinez, the museum inaugurated a new contemporary art commission, L'Onde du Midi by Venezuelan kinetic artist Elias Crespin. The sculpture hovers under the Escalier du Midi, the staircase on the South of the Perrault Colonnade.

The Louvre, like many other museums and galleries, felt the impact of the COVID-19 pandemic on the arts and cultural heritage. The museum closed after the end of the day on 29 February 2020, and it did not reopen until 6 July. The museum operated with limited capacity until 29 October, when it was ordered closed again due to an increase in COVID cases in France, and reopened on 19 May 2021. As a result, the museum recorded only 2.7 million visitors in 2020, down from 9.6 million in 2019 and a record 10.2 million in 2018.

In preparation for the 2024 Olympics, the Louvre staged an exhibit about the Games' history that links their ancient beginnings to the modern era.

Attendance rose to 8.9 million in 2023, 14 percent above 2022, but still short of the record of 10.2 million in 2018.

In January 2025, French president Emmanuel Macron announced plans for a renovation and expansion of the Louvre, including a room solely for the Mona Lisa. The planned renovation and expansion was a result of the increasing number of visitors each year to the Louvre. The renovation is set to begin in September 2026.

On 16 June 2025, the museum's employees went on strike in protest against chronic issues such as overcrowding, understaffing and "untenable" working conditions.

On 19 October 2025, the Louvre was subjected to a robbery through a forced window in the Galerie d'Apollon. The museum reported that jewellery had been stolen, and the perpetrators fled by motorbike. They used a construction platform left by the building to enter a window and leave with their score. The museum was closed for the day. French interior minister Laurent Nuñez said the robbery involved intruders entering the museum via a basket lift using a platform mounted on a lorry and then cut into the window using what appeared to be angle grinders. Nine major pieces of jewellery from the crowns of France were taken in a few minutes. Eight pieces were stolen, including an emerald necklace that belonged to Empress Marie-Louise and three jewels that belonged to queens Marie-Amelie and Hortense. The ninth item, the Crown of Empress Eugénie, was recovered the same day in a street close to the Louvre but in a damaged condition.

On 25 October, two of the suspected thieves were arrested; one was trying to fly to Algeria from Charles de Gaulle Airport. On 29 October, the prosecutor in charge said that they had "partially admitted" to their involvement in the heist. She added that the jewels were yet to be recovered. On the same day, five additional suspects were arrested, but only one of them was allegedly part of the four-man heist team.

On 30 October, police arrested five more suspects, but there was still no sign of the stolen jewels.

In late November, a water line burst and damaged between 300 and 400 books and journals, mostly from the 19th and early 20th centuries.

In early 2026, the museum announced that the Crown of Empress Eugénie, which was damaged during the October 2025 heist, would undergo a comprehensive restoration estimated to cost €40,000 ($47,000). The restoration project, supervised by a scientific committee including representatives from historic jewelry houses such as Cartier and Van Cleef & Arpels, is expected to be completed by the end of 2026.

On 18 May 2026, the French Ministry of Culture and museum officials selected Studios Architecture Paris and Selldorf Architects to lead the "Louvre - New Renaissance" project, a major €1.1 billion ($1.2 billion) overhaul aimed at addressing chronic overcrowding. The initiative centers on a new secondary entrance at the Grande Colonnade on the museum's eastern facade, intended to alleviate pressure on the I.M. Pei-designed glass pyramid. A key feature of the expansion is a dedicated 3,000 m^{2} (32,000 ft^{2}) suite for Leonardo da Vinci's "Mona Lisa", which will feature a separate access route and ticketing system to accommodate the painting's 20,000 daily visitors.

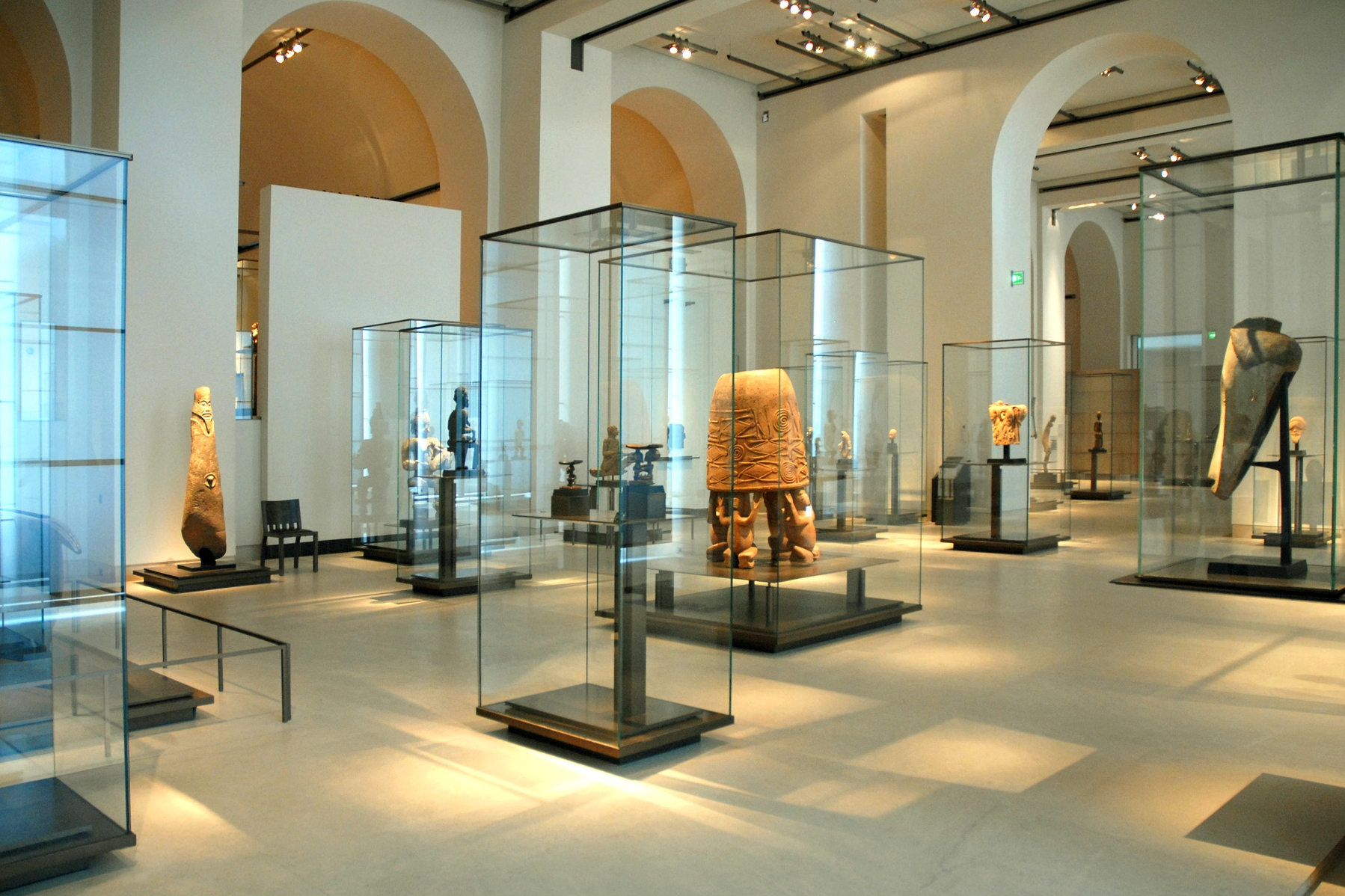
The Pavillon des Sessions's display of non-Western art from the Musée du Quai Branly, opened in 2000

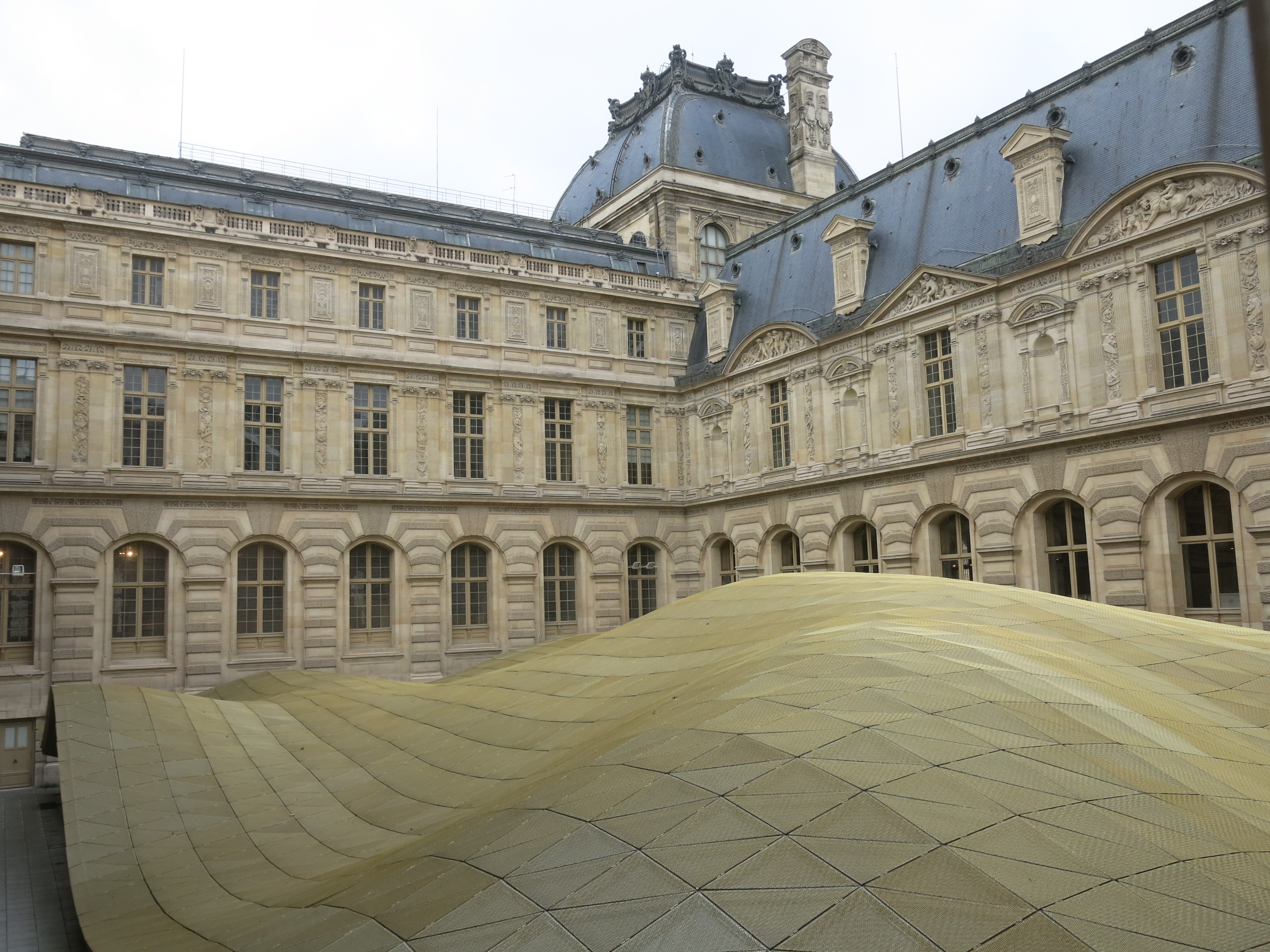
The Cour Visconti's ground floor covered to host the new Islamic Art Department in 2012

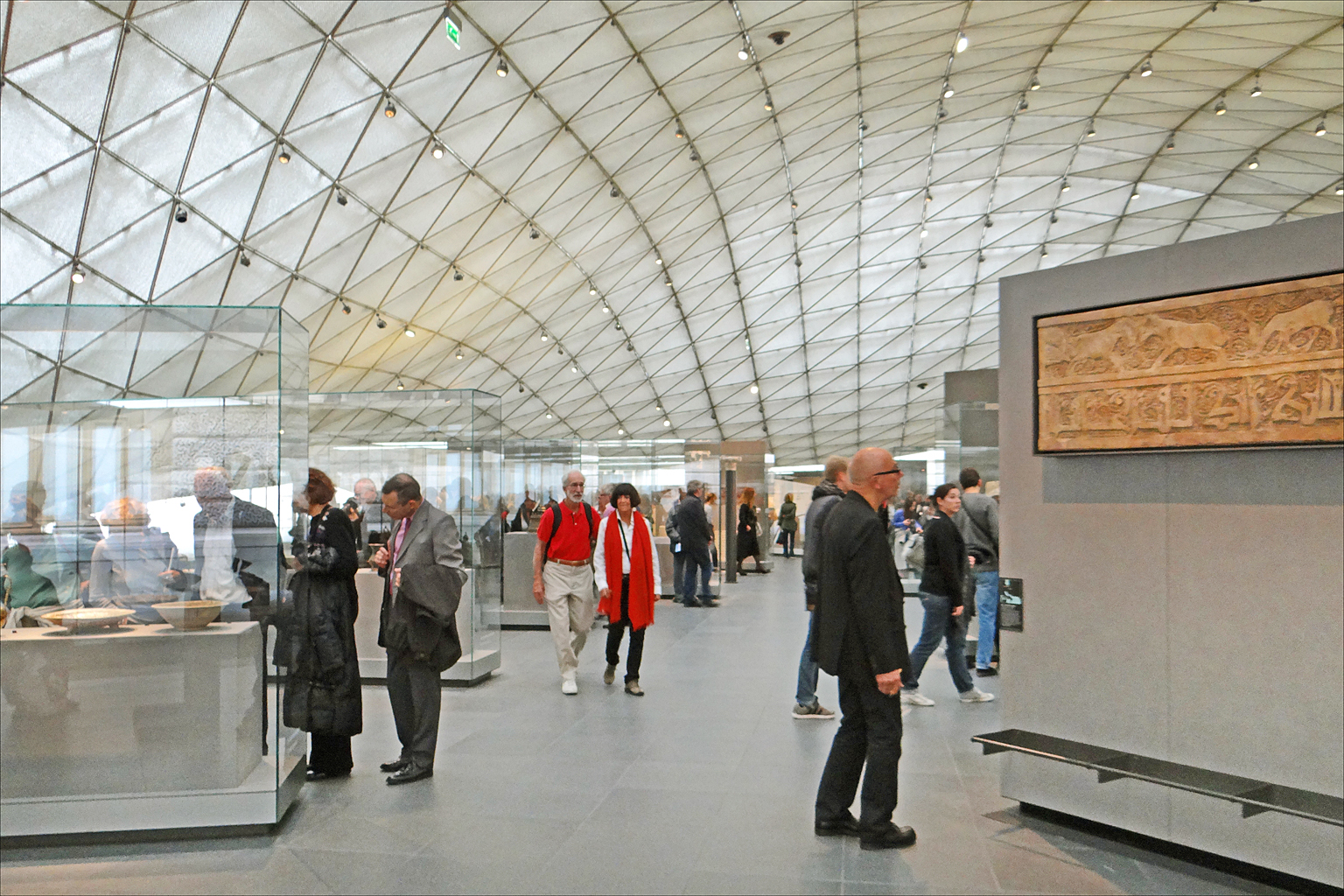
Islamic art display in the covered Cour Visconti, 2012

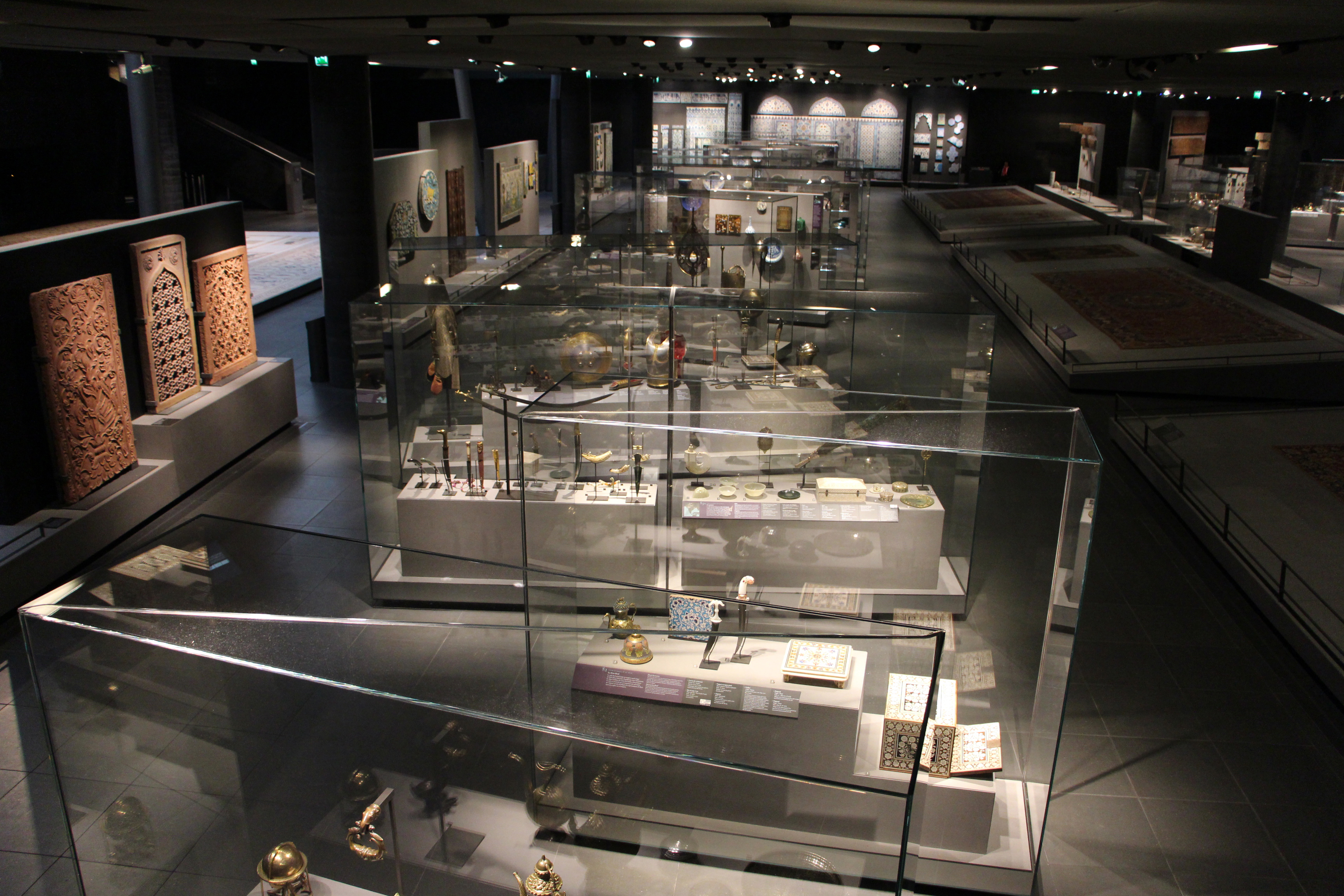
Underground display of the Islamic Art Department, 2012

== Collections ==
The Musée du Louvre owns 615,797 objects of which 482,943 are accessible online since 24 March 2021 and displays 35,000 works of art in eight curatorial departments.

The Louvre is home to one of the world's most extensive collections of art, including works from diverse cultures and time periods. Visitors can view iconic works like the Mona Lisa and the Winged Victory of Samothrace, as well as pieces from ancient civilisations such as Egypt, Greece, and Rome. The museum also features collections of decorative arts, Islamic art, and sculptures.

=== Egyptian antiquities ===
The department, comprising over 50,000 pieces, includes artefacts from the Nile civilisations which date from 4,000 BC to the 4th century AD. The collection, among the world's largest, overviews Egyptian life spanning Ancient Egypt, the Middle Kingdom, the New Kingdom, Coptic art, and the Roman, Ptolemaic, and Byzantine periods.

The department's origins lie in the royal collection, but it was augmented by Napoleon's 1798 expeditionary trip with Dominique Vivant, the future director of the Louvre. After Jean-François Champollion translated the Rosetta Stone, Charles X decreed that an Egyptian Antiquities department be created. Champollion advised the purchase of three collections, formed by Edmé-Antoine Durand, Henry Salt, and Bernardino Drovetti; these additions added 7,000 works. Growth continued via acquisitions by Auguste Mariette, founder of the Egyptian Museum in Cairo. Mariette, after excavations at Memphis, sent back crates of archaeological finds including The Seated Scribe.

Guarded by the Great Sphinx of Tanis, the collection is housed in more than 20 rooms. Holdings include art, papyrus scrolls, mummies, tools, clothing, jewellery, games, musical instruments, and weapons. Pieces from the ancient period include the Gebel el-Arak Knife from 3400 BC, The Seated Scribe, and the Head of King Djedefre. Middle Kingdom art, "known for its gold work and statues", moved from realism to idealisation; this is exemplified by the schist statue of Amenemhatankh and the wooden Offering Bearer. The New Kingdom and Coptic Egyptian sections are deep, but the statue of the goddess Nephthys and the limestone depiction of the goddess Hathor demonstrate New Kingdom sentiment and wealth.

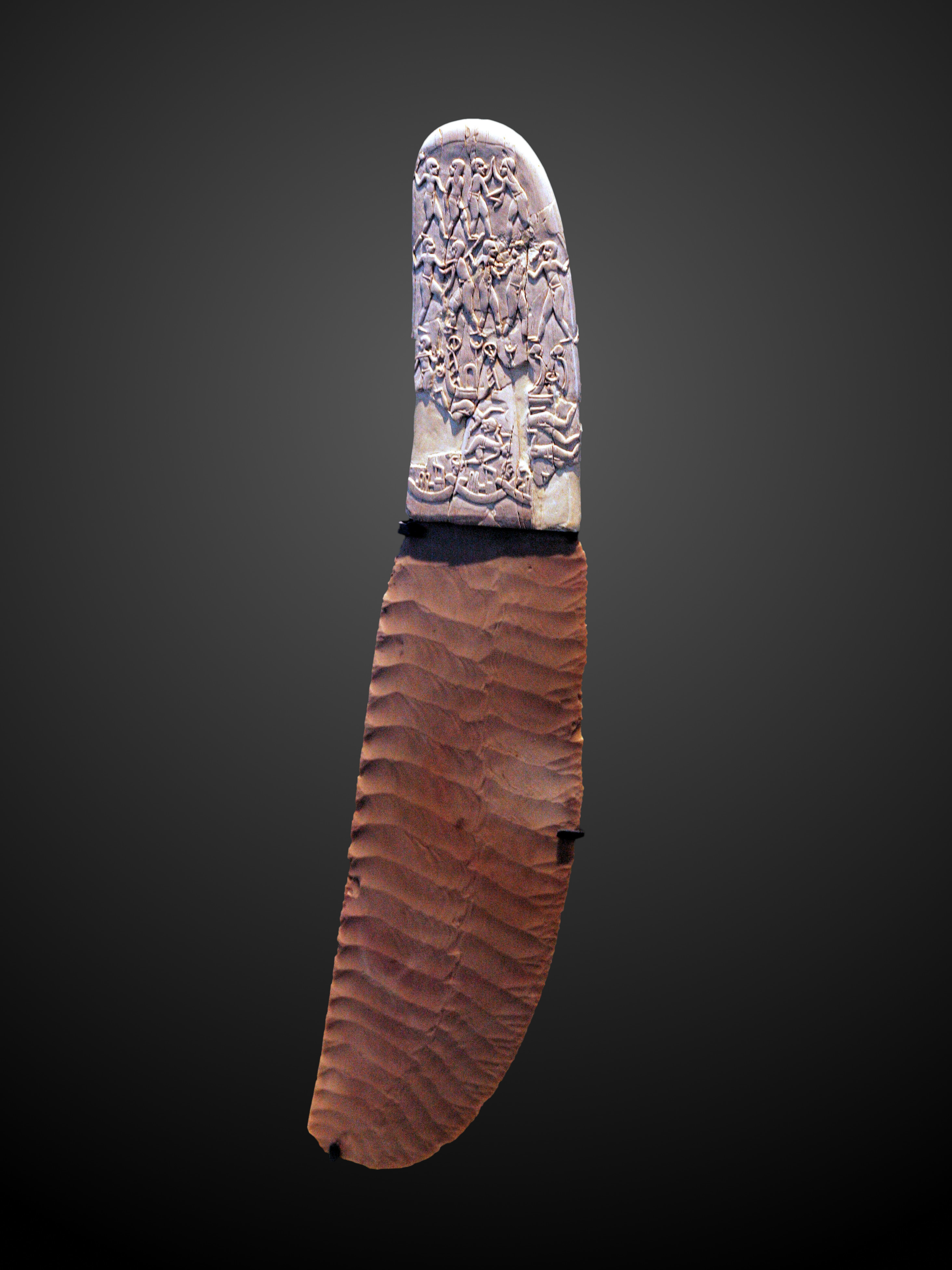
The Gebel el-Arak Knife; 3300–3200 BC; handle: elephant ivory, blade: flint; length: 25.8 cm

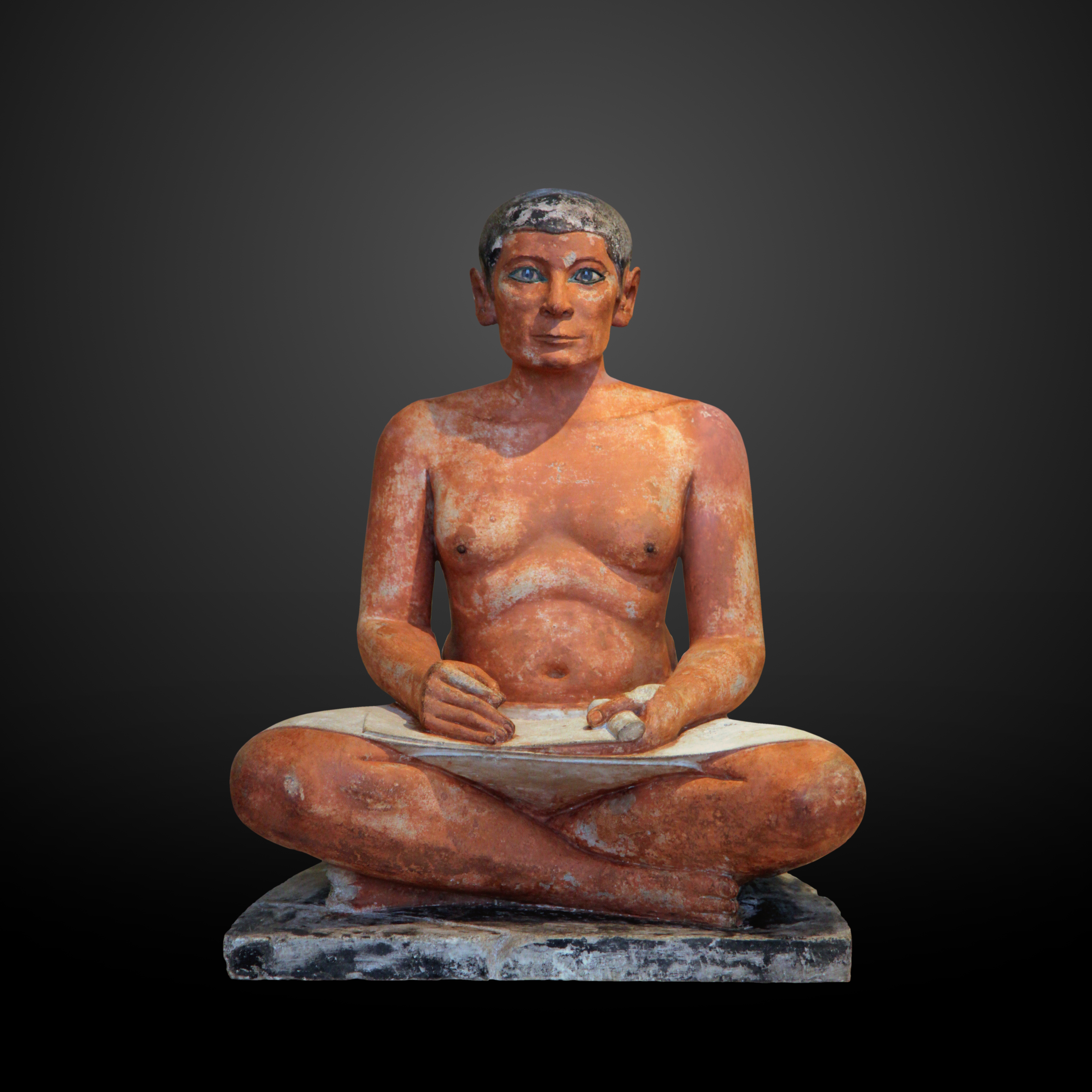
The Seated Scribe; 2613–2494 BC; painted limestone and inlaid quartz; height: 53.7 cm

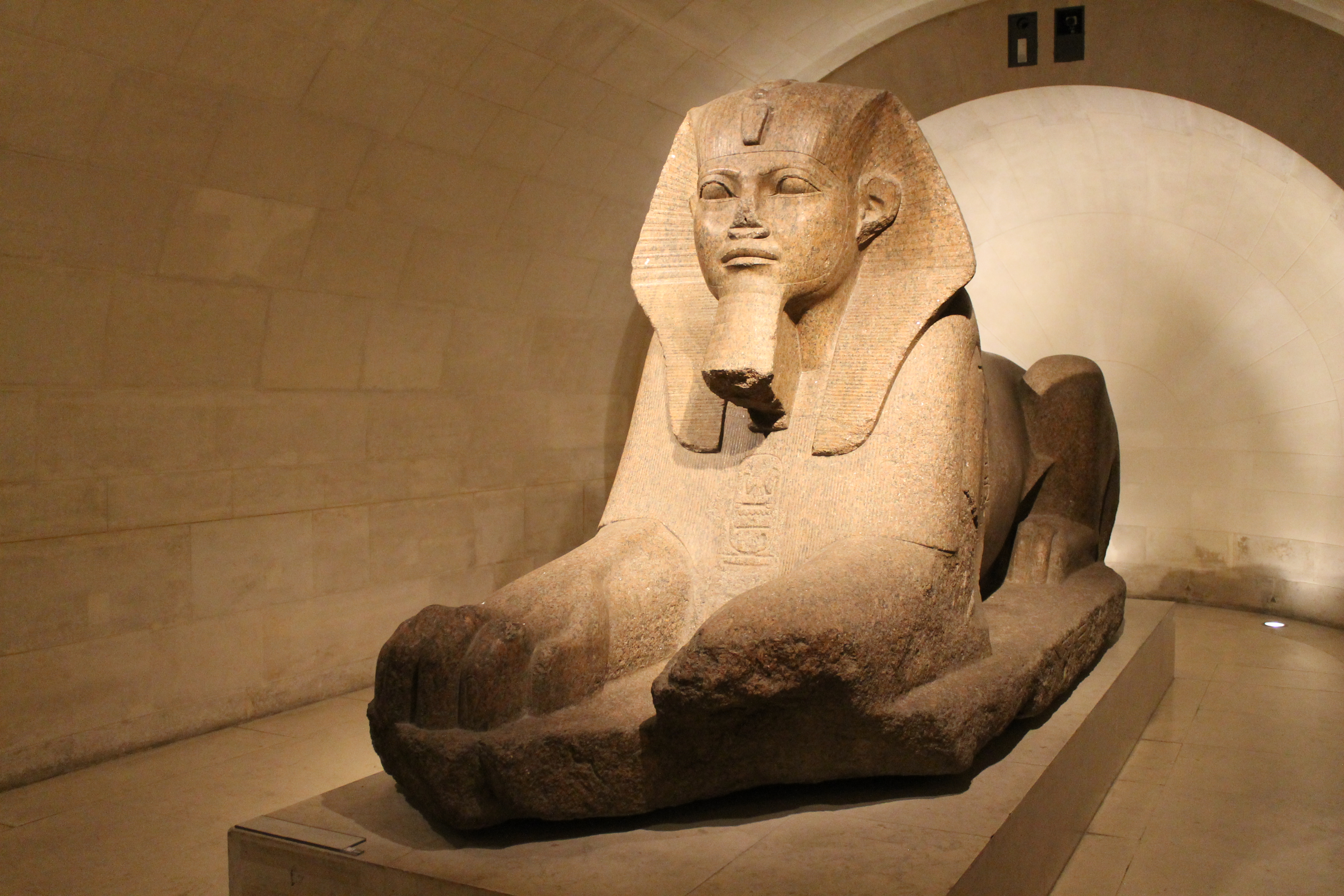
The Great Sphinx of Tanis; circa 2600 BC; rose granite; height: 183 cm, width: 154 cm, thickness: 480 cm

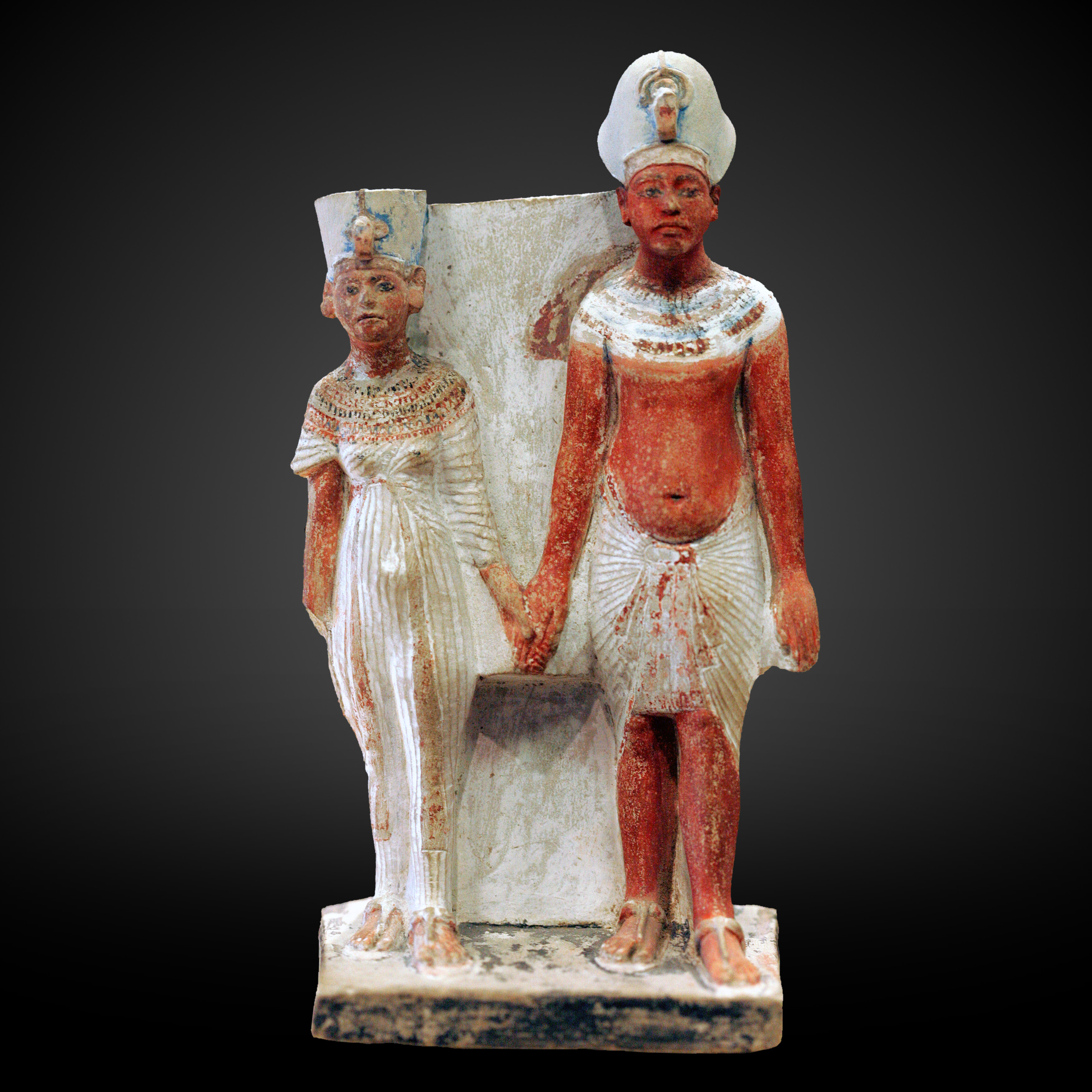
Akhenaten and Nefertiti; 1345 BC; painted limestone; height: 22.2 cm, width: 12.3 cm, thickness: 9.8 cm

=== Near Eastern antiquities ===
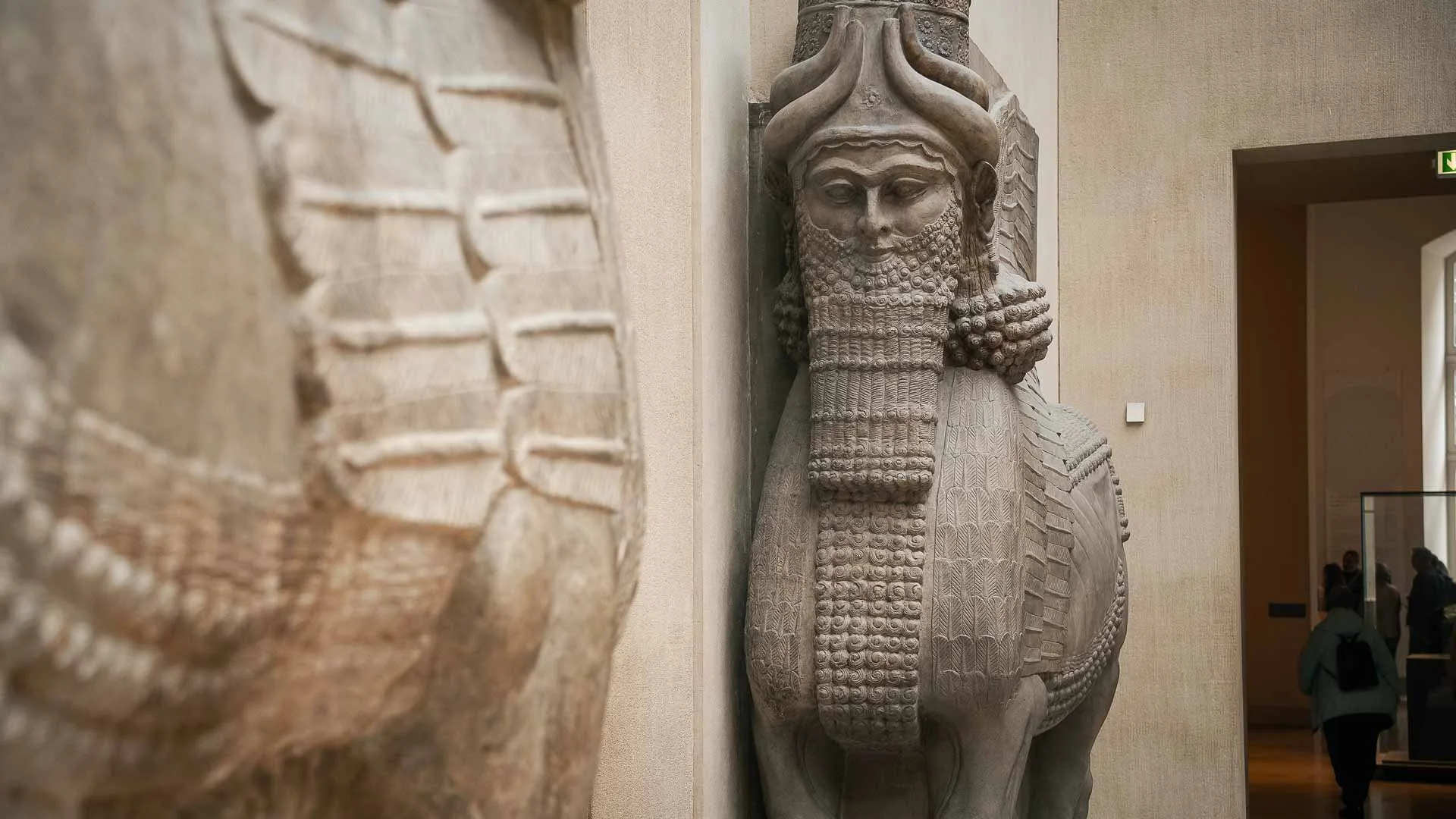
Ancient sculpture exhibited in the Department of Near Eastern Antiquities at the Louvre Museum

Near Eastern antiquities, the second newest department, dates from 1881 and presents an overview of early Near Eastern civilisation and "first settlements", before the arrival of Islam. The department is divided into three geographic areas: the Levant, Mesopotamia (Iraq), and Persia (Iran). The collection's development corresponds to archaeological work such as Paul-Émile Botta's 1843 expedition to Khorsabad and the discovery of Sargon II's palace. These finds formed the basis of the Assyrian museum, the precursor to today's department.

The museum contains exhibits from Sumer and the city of Akkad, with monuments such as the Prince of Lagash's Stele of the Vultures from 2450 BC and the stele erected by Naram-Sin, King of Akkad, to celebrate a victory over barbarians in the Zagros Mountains. The 2.25-metre (7.38 ft) Code of Hammurabi, discovered in 1901, displays Babylonian Laws prominently, so that no man could plead their ignorance. The 18th-century BC mural of the Investiture of Zimrilim and the 25th-century BC Statue of Ebih-Il found in the ancient city-state of Mari are also on display at the museum.

A significant portion of the department covers the ancient Levant, including the Sarcophagus of Eshmunazar II discovered in 1855, which catalysed Ernest Renan's 1860 Mission de Phénicie. It contains one of the world's largest and most comprehensive collections of Canaanite and Aramaic inscriptions. The section also covers North African Punic antiquities (Punic = Western Phoenician), given the significant French presence in the region in the 19th century, with early finds including the 1843 discovery of the Ain Nechma inscriptions.

The Persian portion of Louvre contains work from the archaic period, like the Funerary Head and the Persian Archers of Darius I, and rare objects from Persepolis.

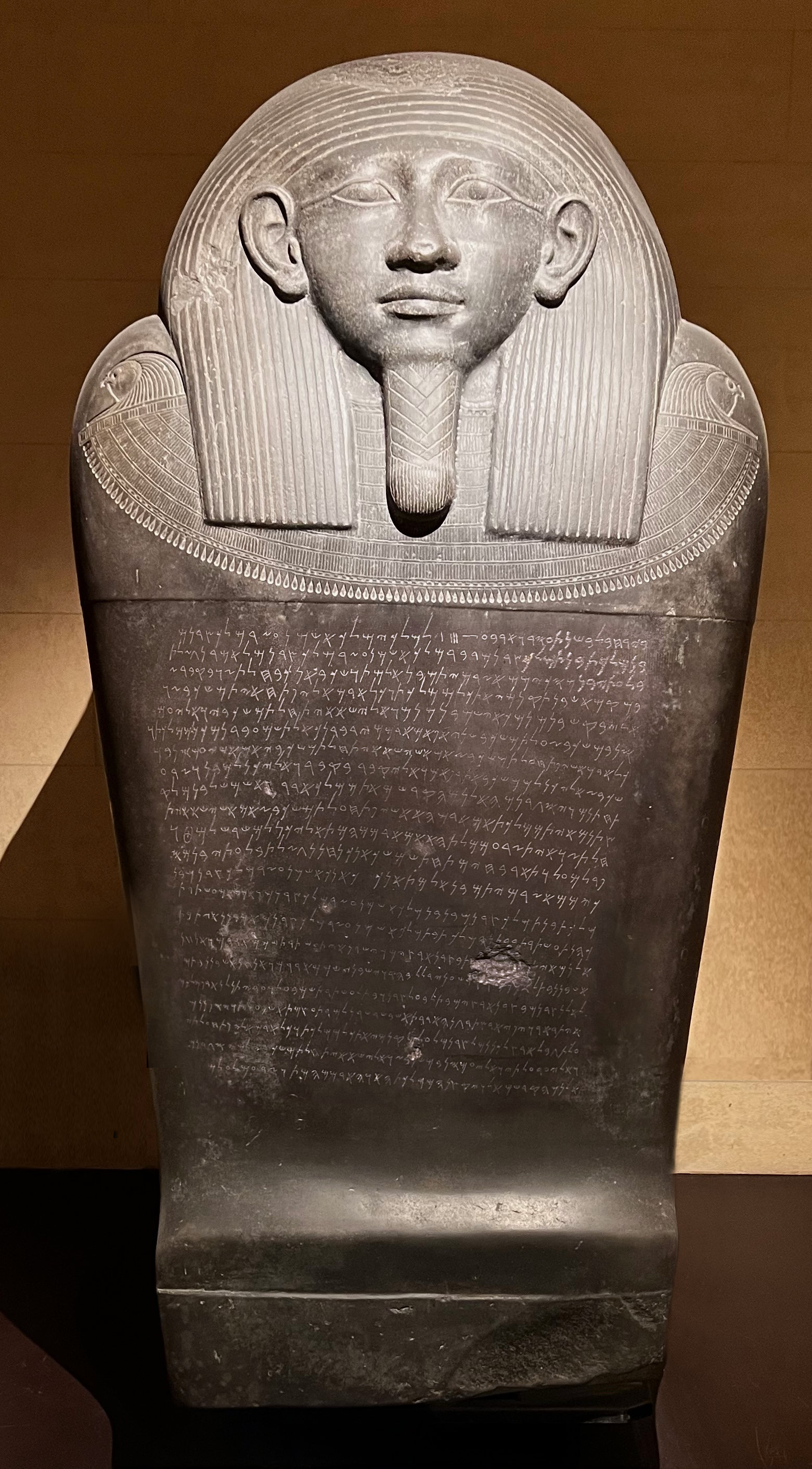
Sarcophagus of Eshmunazar II, one of only three Ancient Egyptian sarcophagi found outside Egypt, and the first Phoenician inscription discovered in Phoenicia

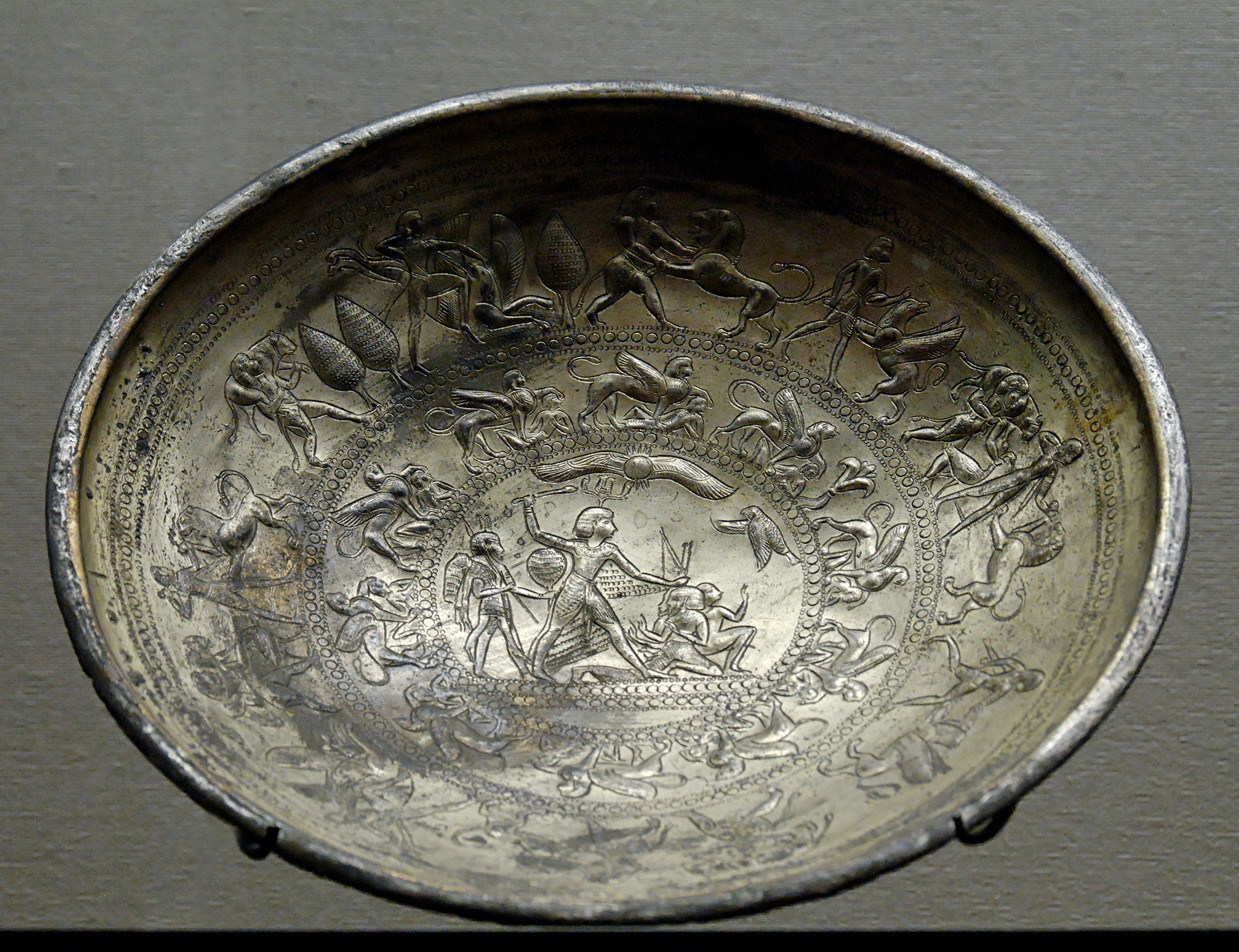
Phoenician metal bowls from Cyprus

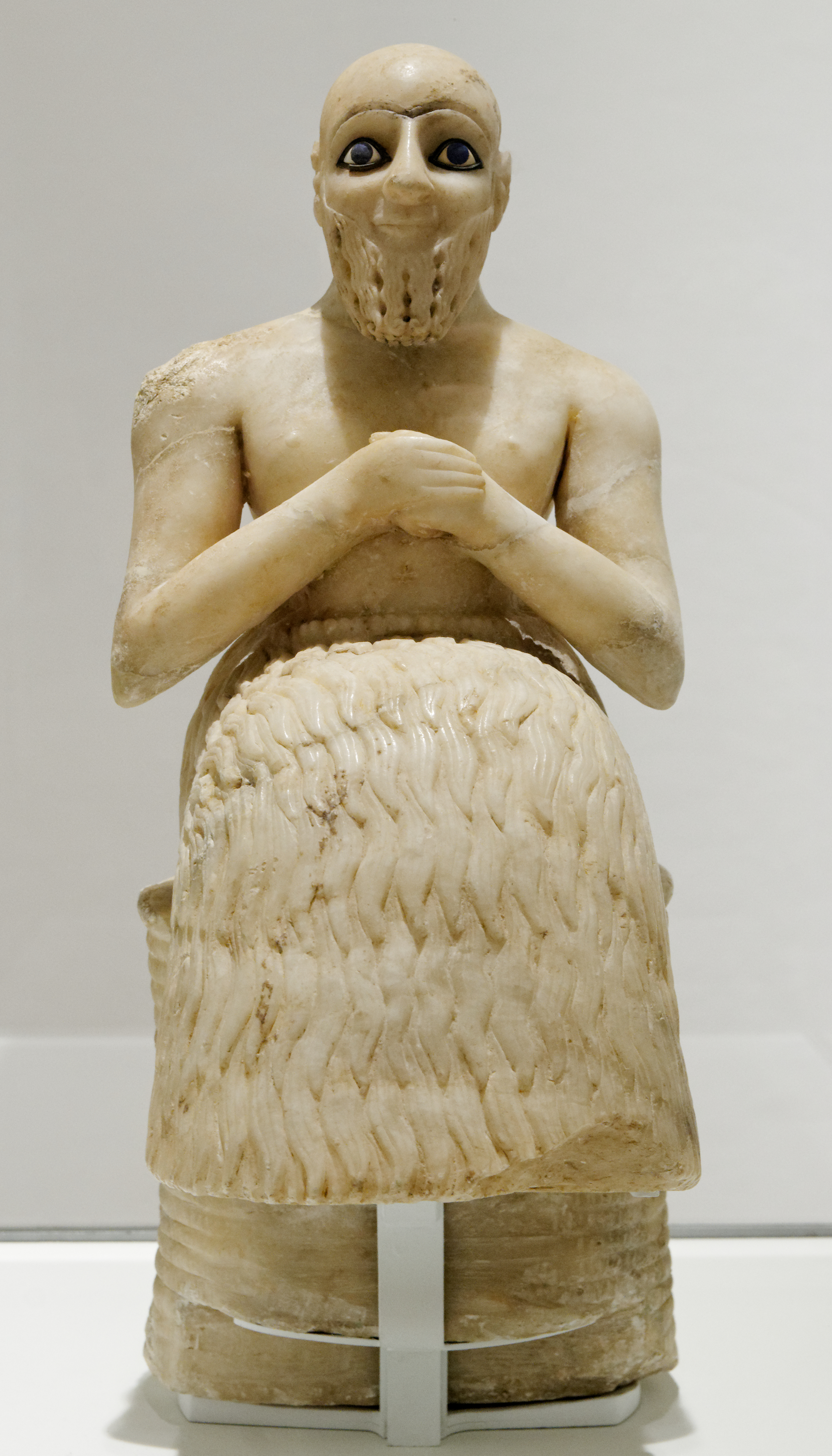
The Statue of Ebih-Il; circa 2400 BC; gypsum, schist, shells and lapis lazuli; height: 52.5 cm

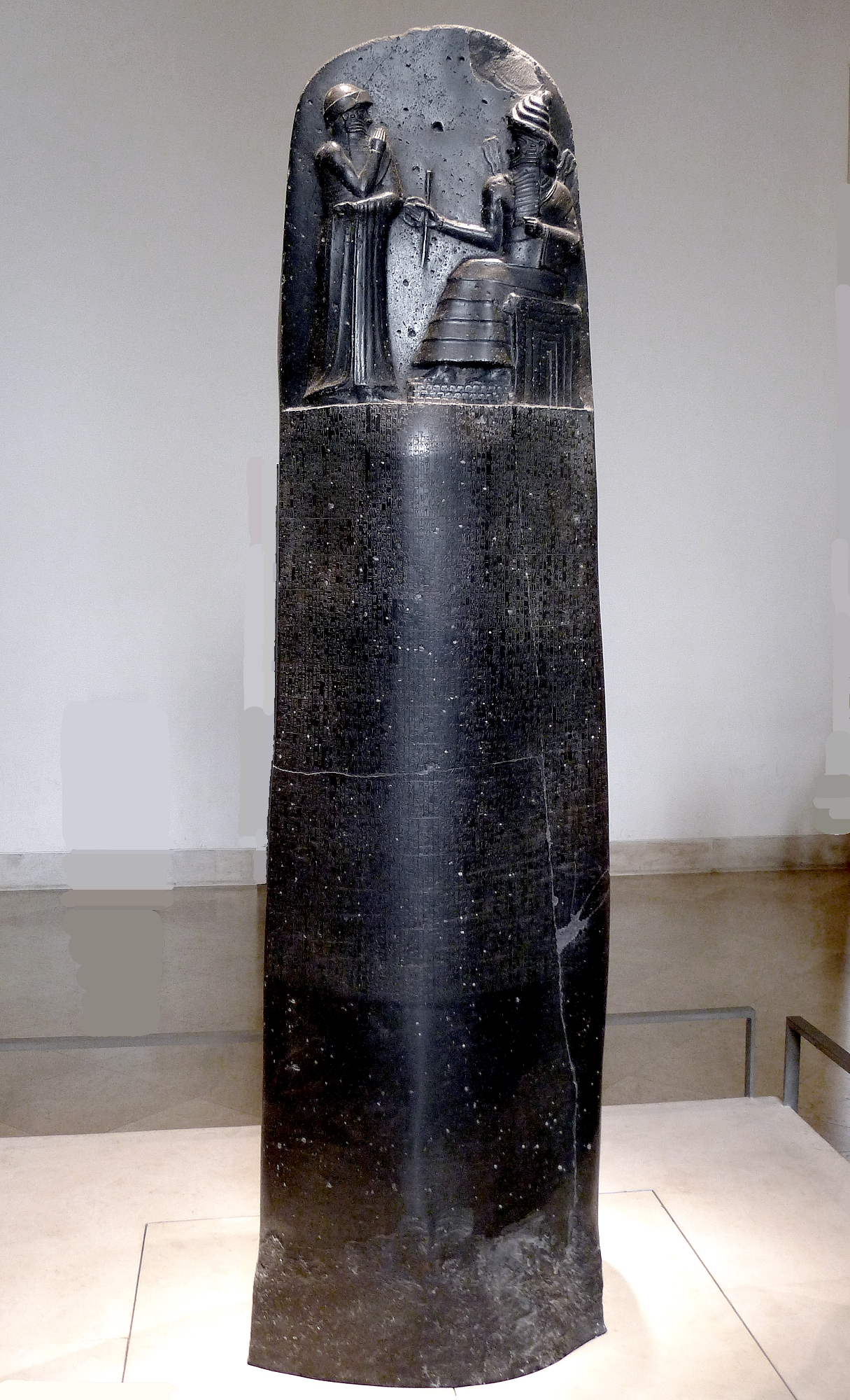
The Code of Hammurabi; 1755–1750 BC; basalt; height: 225 cm, width: 79 cm, thickness: 47 cm

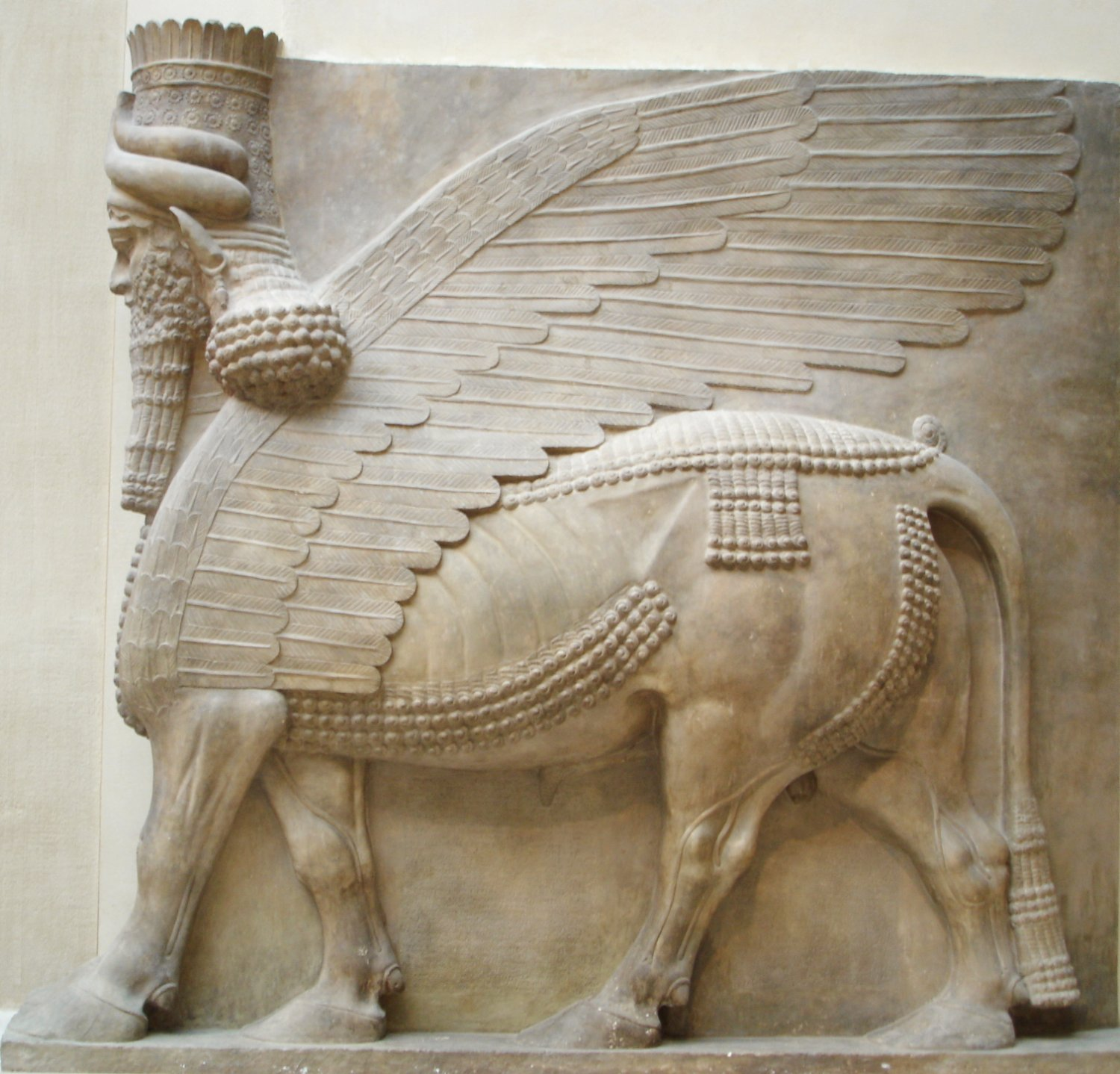
Assyrian lamassu (Human-headed winged bull); circa 713–716 BC; 4.2 x 4.4 x 1 m

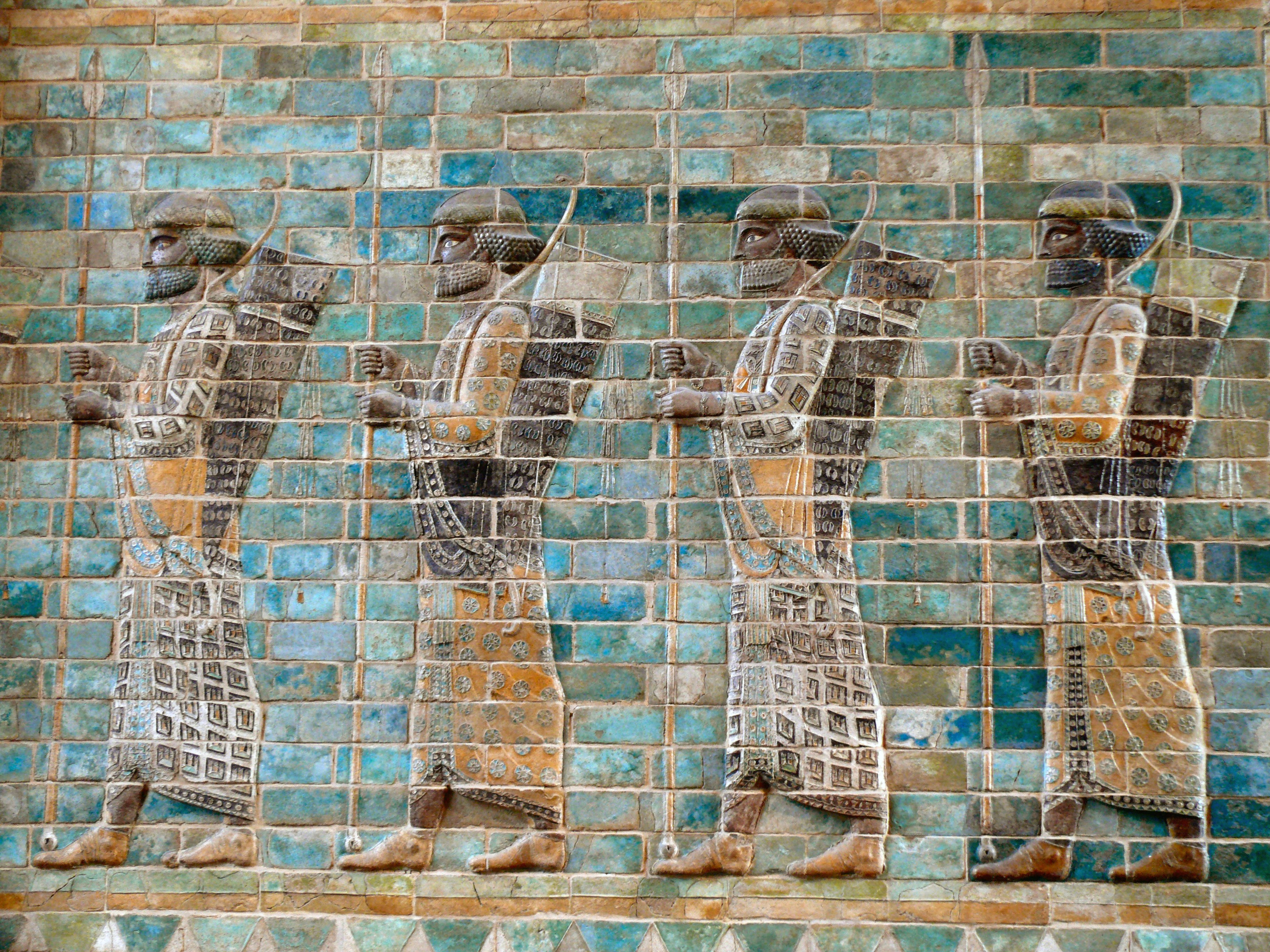
Frieze of archers, from the Palace of Darius at Susa; circa 510 BC; bricks

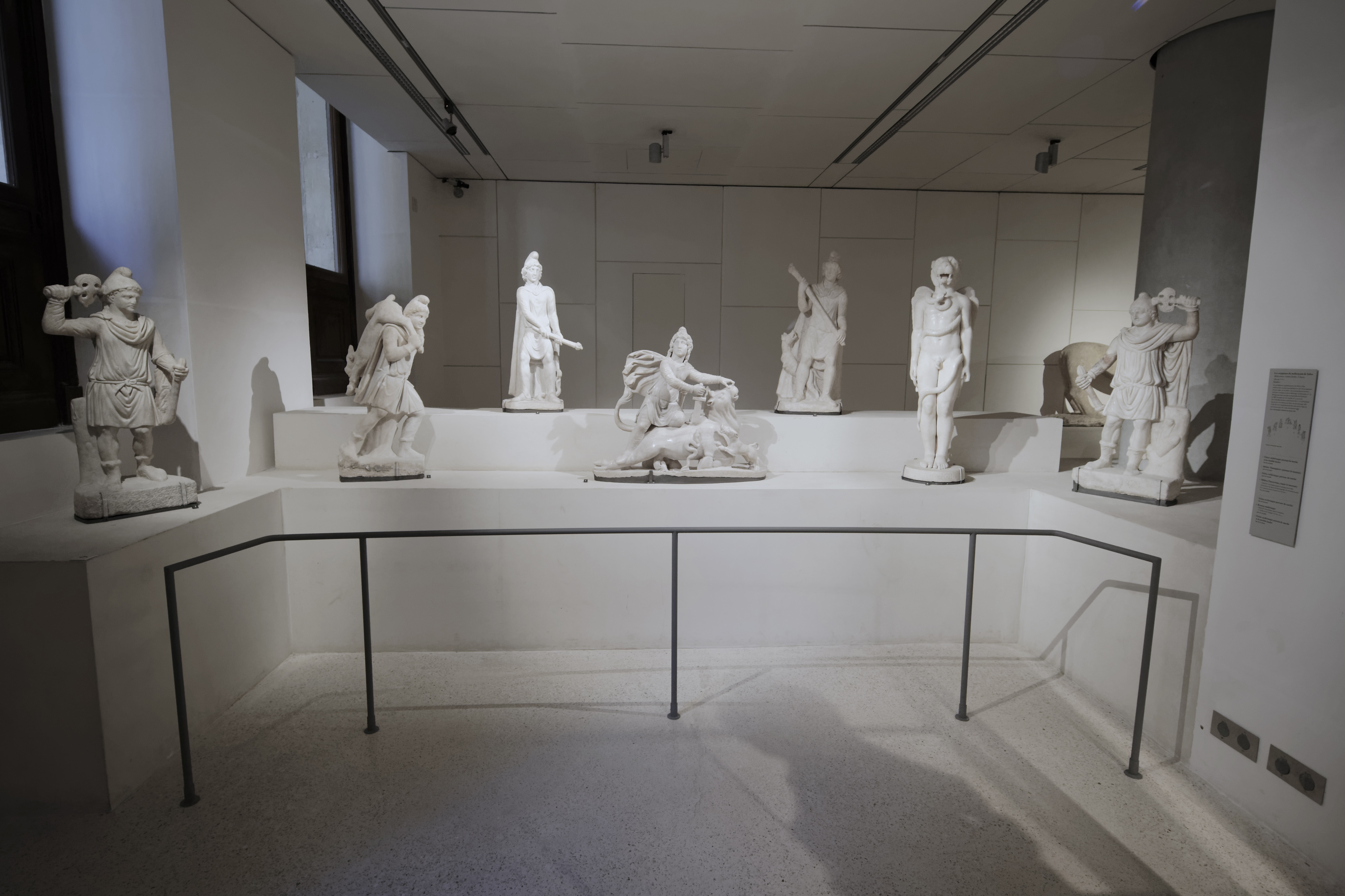
Statues from the Sidon Mithraeum

=== Greek, Etruscan, and Roman ===
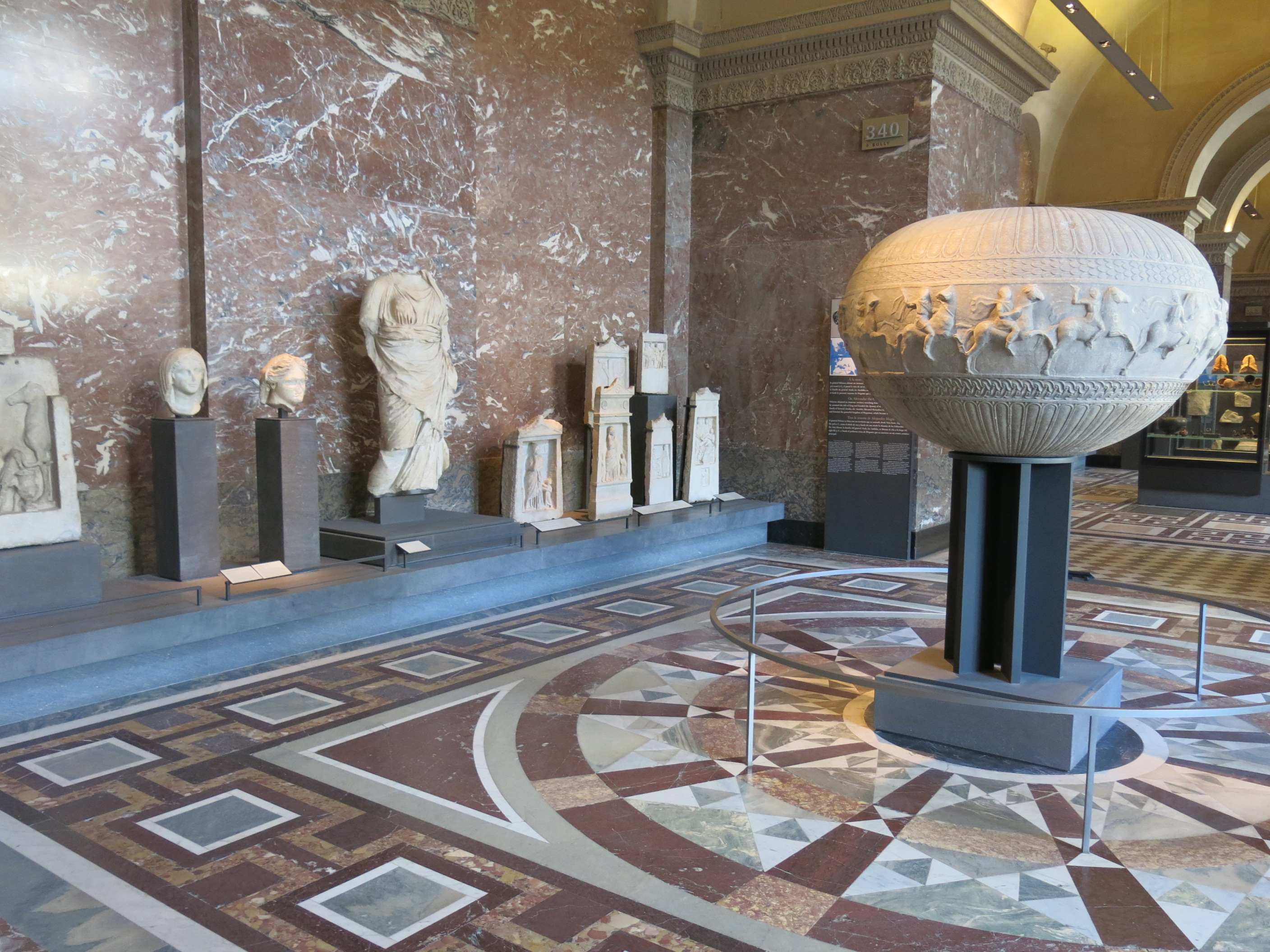
Greek antiquities in Room 11

The Greek, Etruscan, and Roman department displays pieces from the Mediterranean Basin dating from the Neolithic to the 6th century. The collection spans from the Cycladic period to the decline of the Roman Empire. This department is one of the museum's oldest, and contains works acquired by Francis I. Initially, the collection focused on marble sculptures, such as the Venus de Milo. Works such as the Apollo Belvedere arrived during the Napoleonic Wars, of which some were returned after Napoleon I's fall in 1815. Other works, such as the Borghese Vase, were bought by Napoleon. Later in the 19th century, the Louvre acquired works including vases from the Durand collection and bronzes.

The archaic is demonstrated by jewellery and pieces such as the limestone Lady of Auxerre, from 640 BC; and the cylindrical Hera of Samos, c. 570–560 BC. After the 4th century BC, focus on the human form increased, exemplified by the Borghese Gladiator. The Louvre holds masterpieces from the Hellenistic era, including The Winged Victory of Samothrace (190 BC) and the Venus de Milo, symbolic of classical art. The long Galerie Campana displays an outstanding collection of more than one thousand Greek potteries. In the galleries paralleling the Seine, much of the museum's Roman sculpture is displayed. The Roman portraiture is representative of that genre; examples include the portraits of Agrippa and Annius Verus; among the bronzes is the Greek Apollo of Piombino.

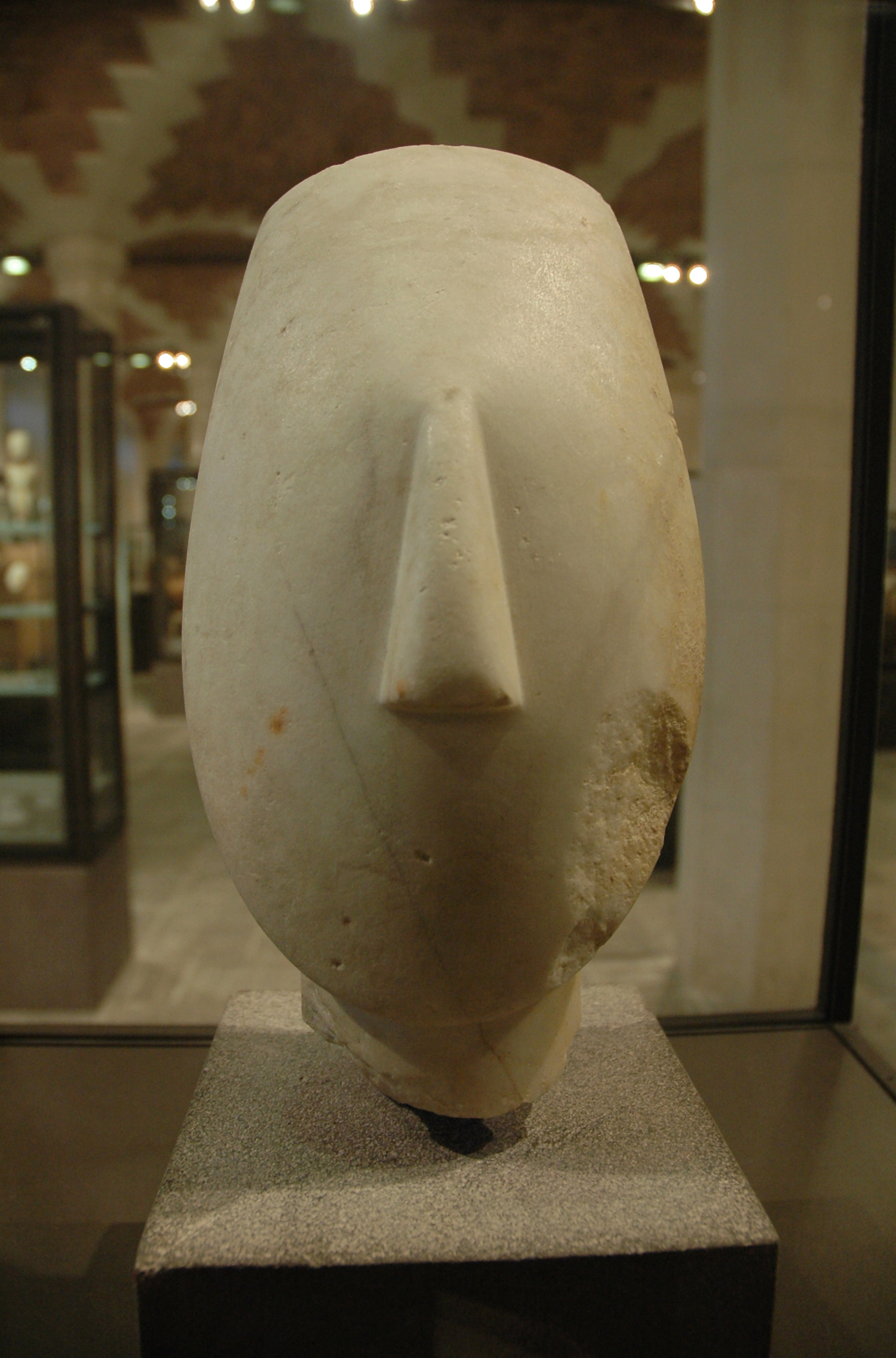
Cycladic head of a woman; 27th century BC; marble; height: 27 cm

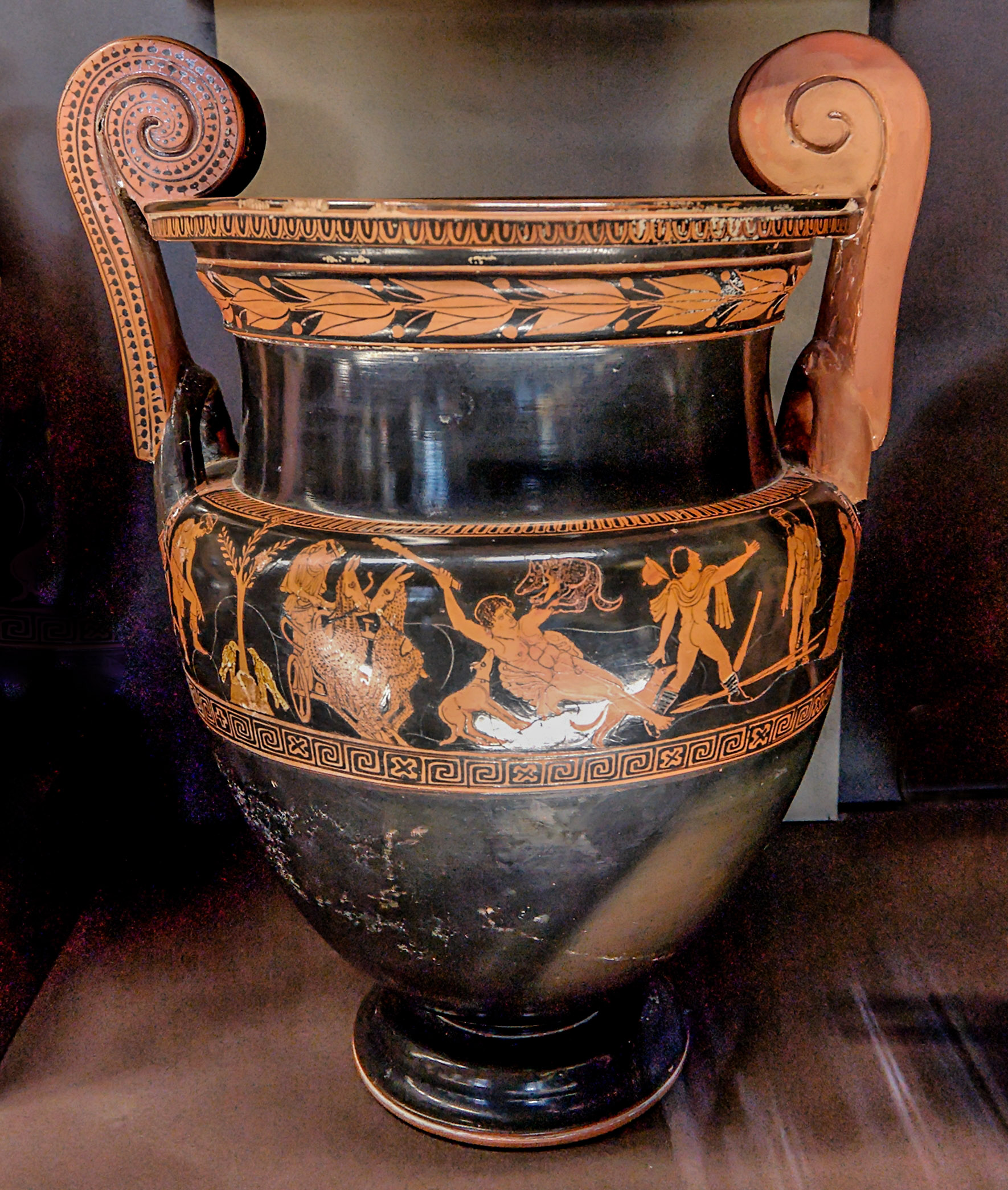
Volute krater that depicts Actaeon's death; circa 450–440 BC; ceramic; height: 51 cm, diameter: 33.1 cm

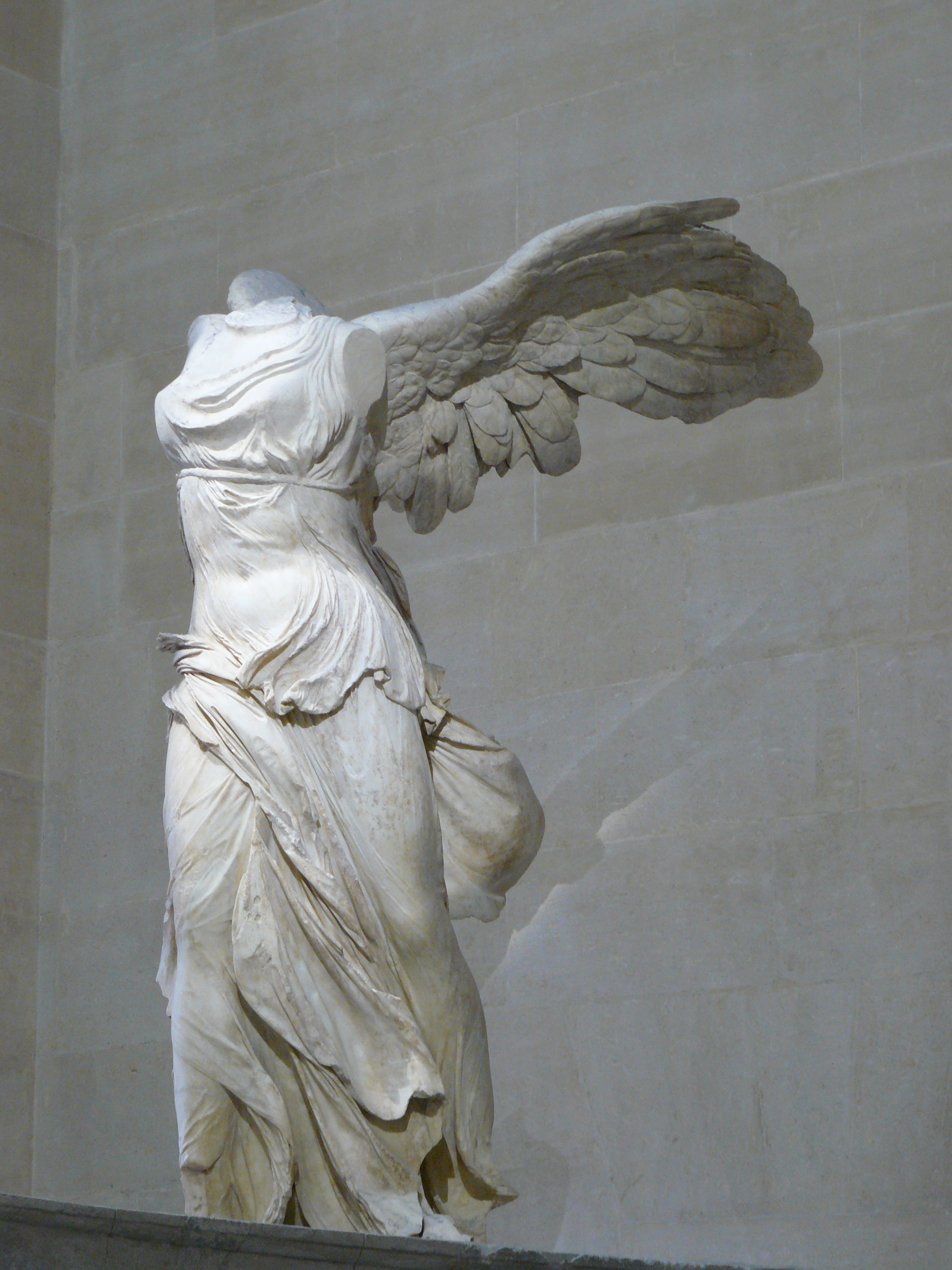
The Winged Victory of Samothrace; 200–190 BC; Parian marble; 244 cm

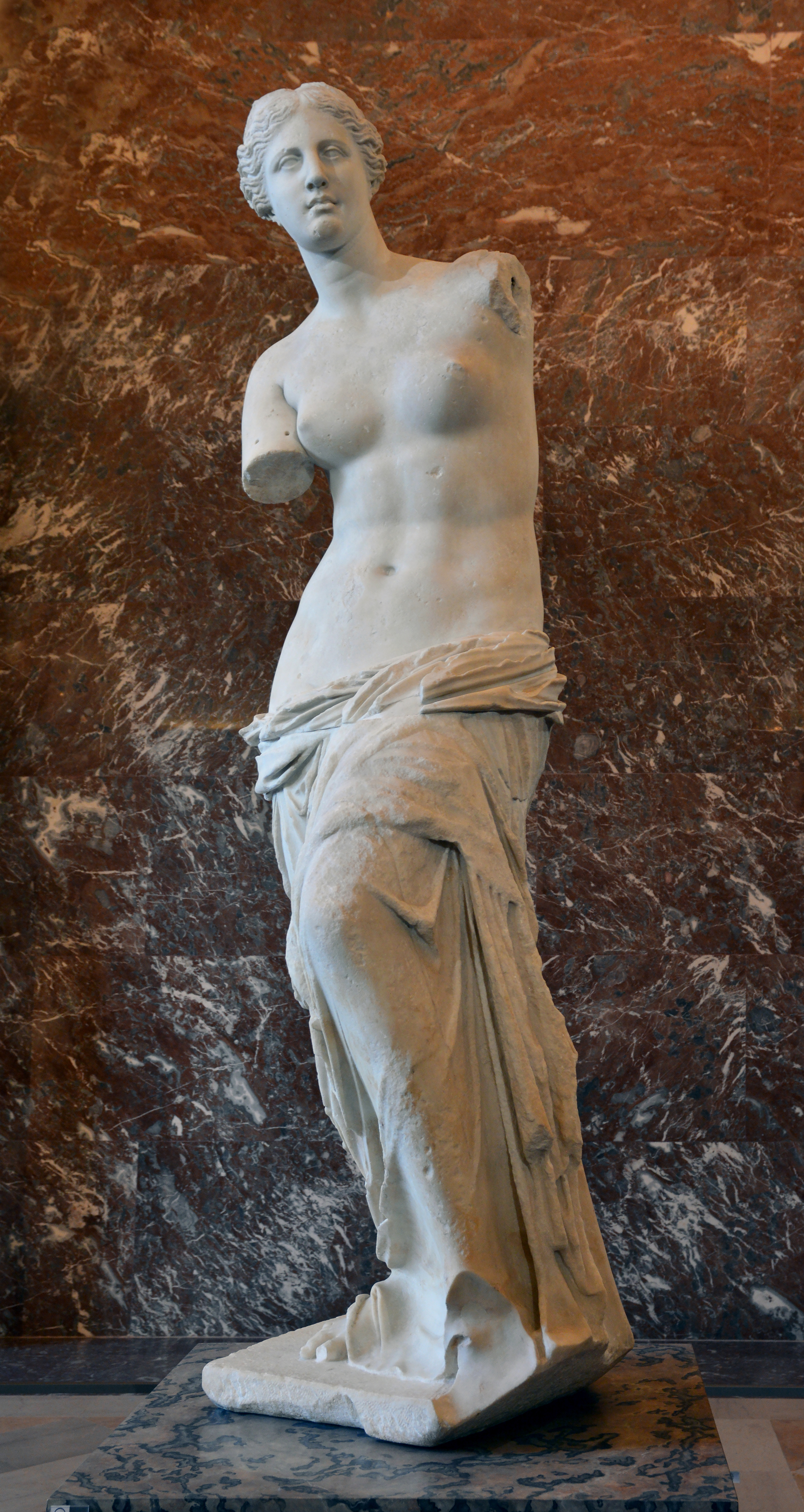
Venus de Milo; 130–100 BC; marble; height: 203 cm

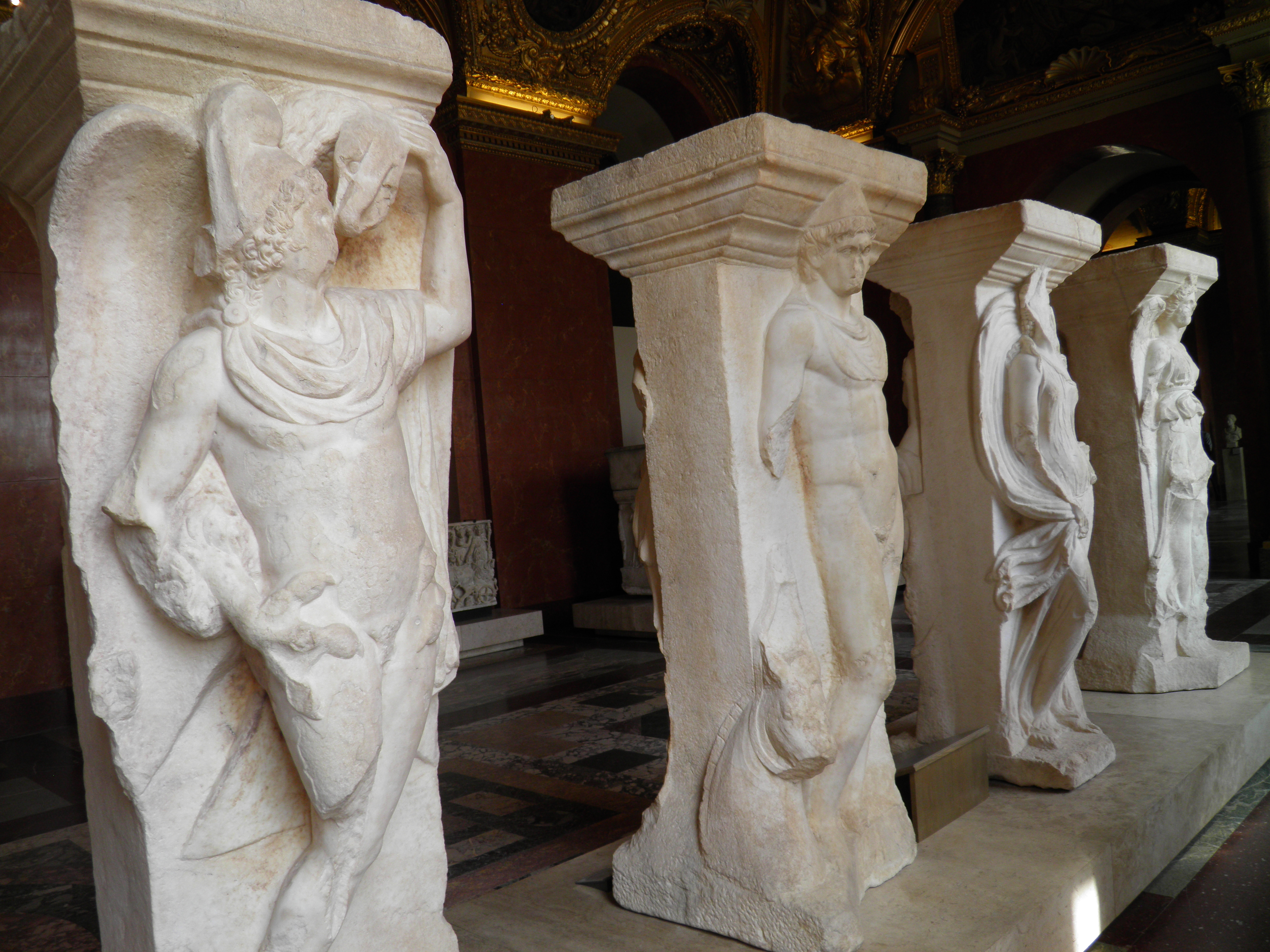
Las Incantadas, sculptures from a portico that adorned the Roman Forum of Thessalonica, 150–230 AD

=== Islamic art ===
The Islamic art collection, the museum's newest, spans "thirteen centuries and three continents". These exhibits, of ceramics, glass, metalware, wood, ivory, carpet, textiles, and miniatures, include more than 5,000 works and 1,000 shards. Originally part of the decorative arts department, the holdings became separate in 2003. Among the works are the Pyxide d'al-Mughira, a 10th century ivory box from Andalusia; the Baptistery of Saint-Louis, an engraved brass basin from the 13th or 14th century Mamluk period; and the 10th century Shroud of Saint-Josse from Iran. The collection contains three pages of the Shahnameh, an epic book of poems by Ferdowsi in Persian, and a Syrian metalwork named the Barberini Vase. In September 2019, a new and improved Islamic art department was opened by Princess Lamia bint Majed Al Saud. The new department exhibits 3,000 pieces were collected from Spain to India via the Arabian peninsula dating from the 7th to the 19th centuries.

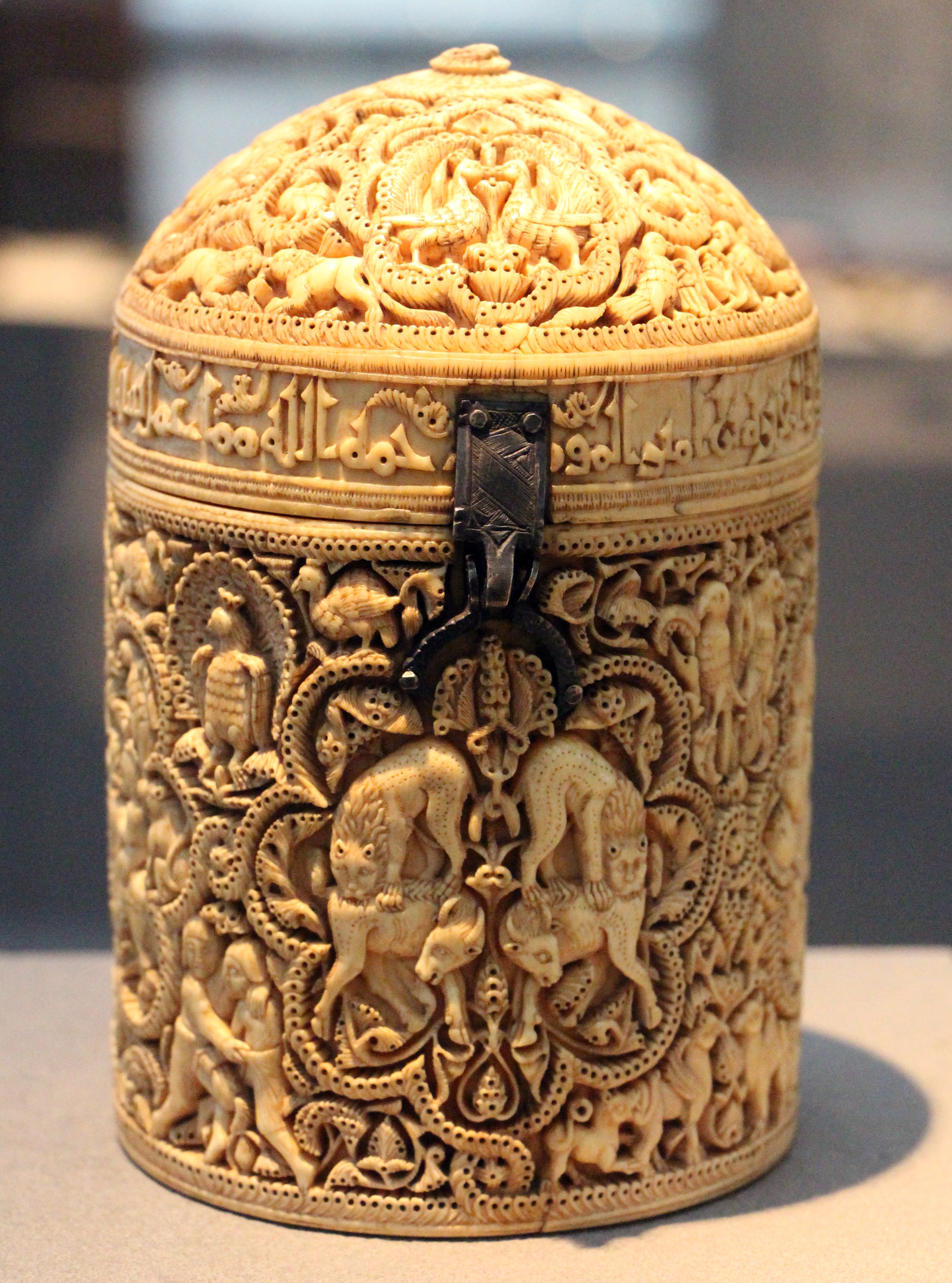
The Pyxis of al-Mughira; 10th century (maybe 968); ivory; 15 x 8 cm

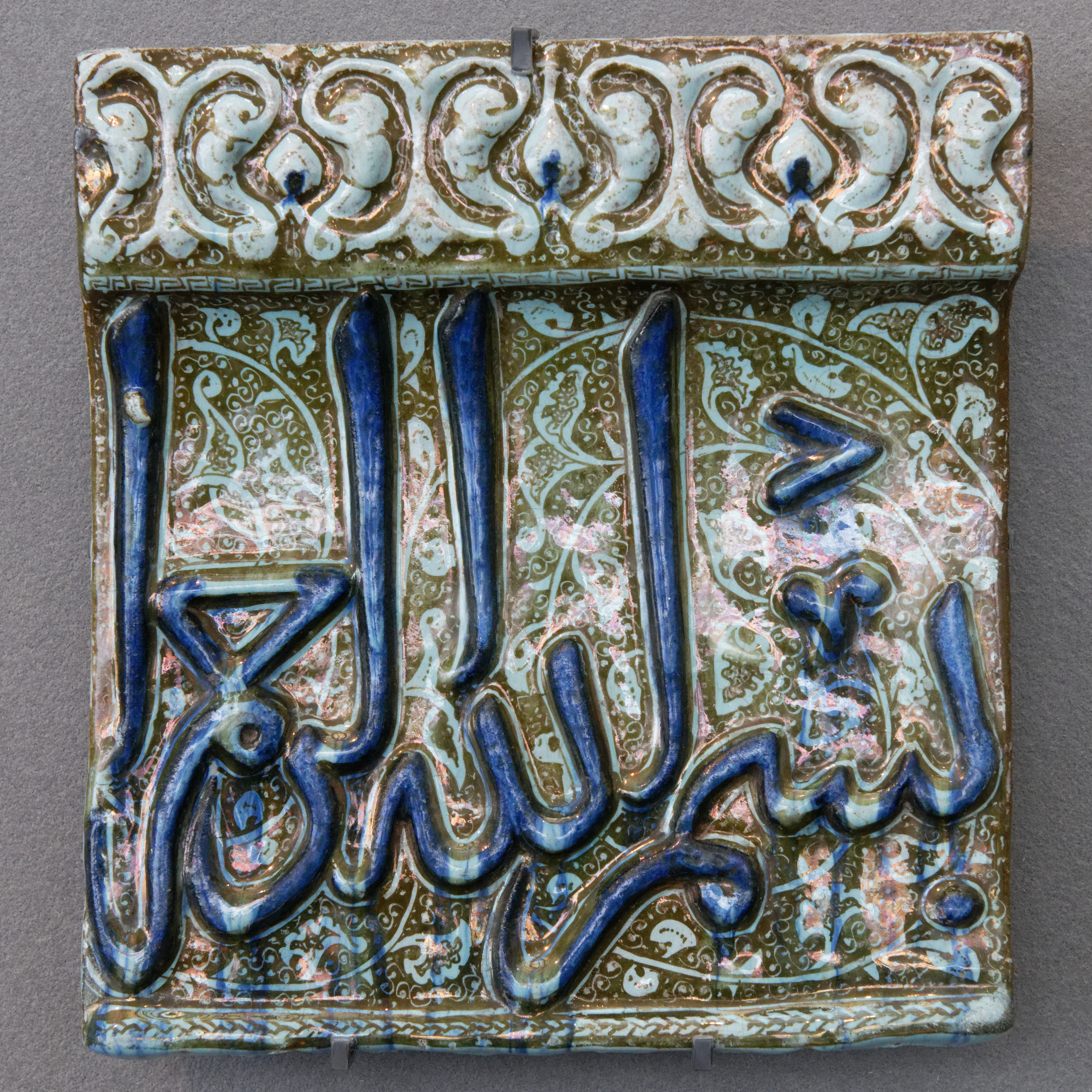
Iranian tile with bismillah; turn of the 13th-14th century; moulded ceramic, lustre glaze and glaze

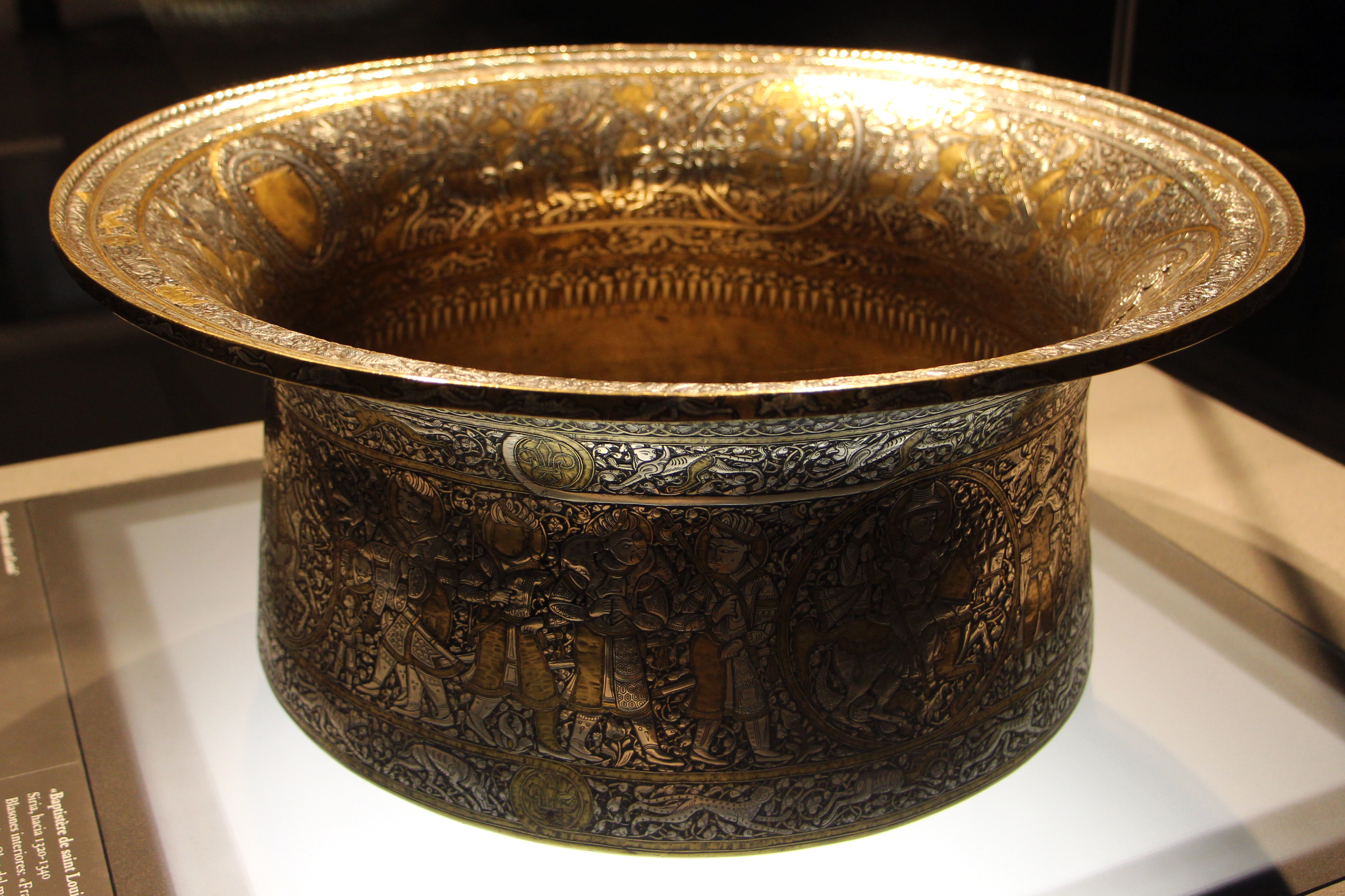
The Baptistère de Saint Louis; by Muhammad ibn al-Zayn; 1320–1340; hammering, engraving, inlay in brass, gold, and silver; 50.2 x 22.2 cm

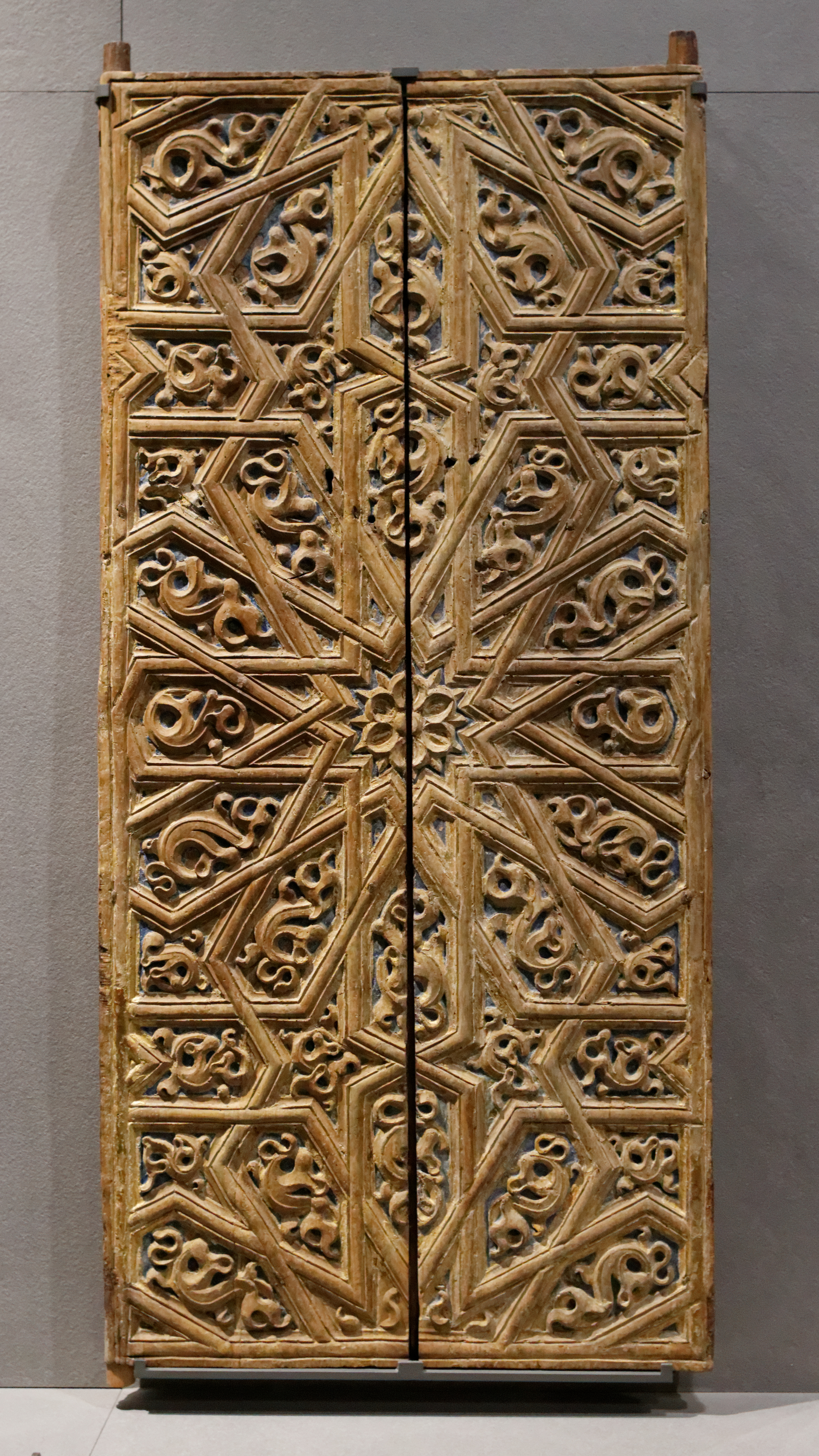
Door; 15th-16th century; sculpted, painted and gilded walnut wood

=== Sculptures ===
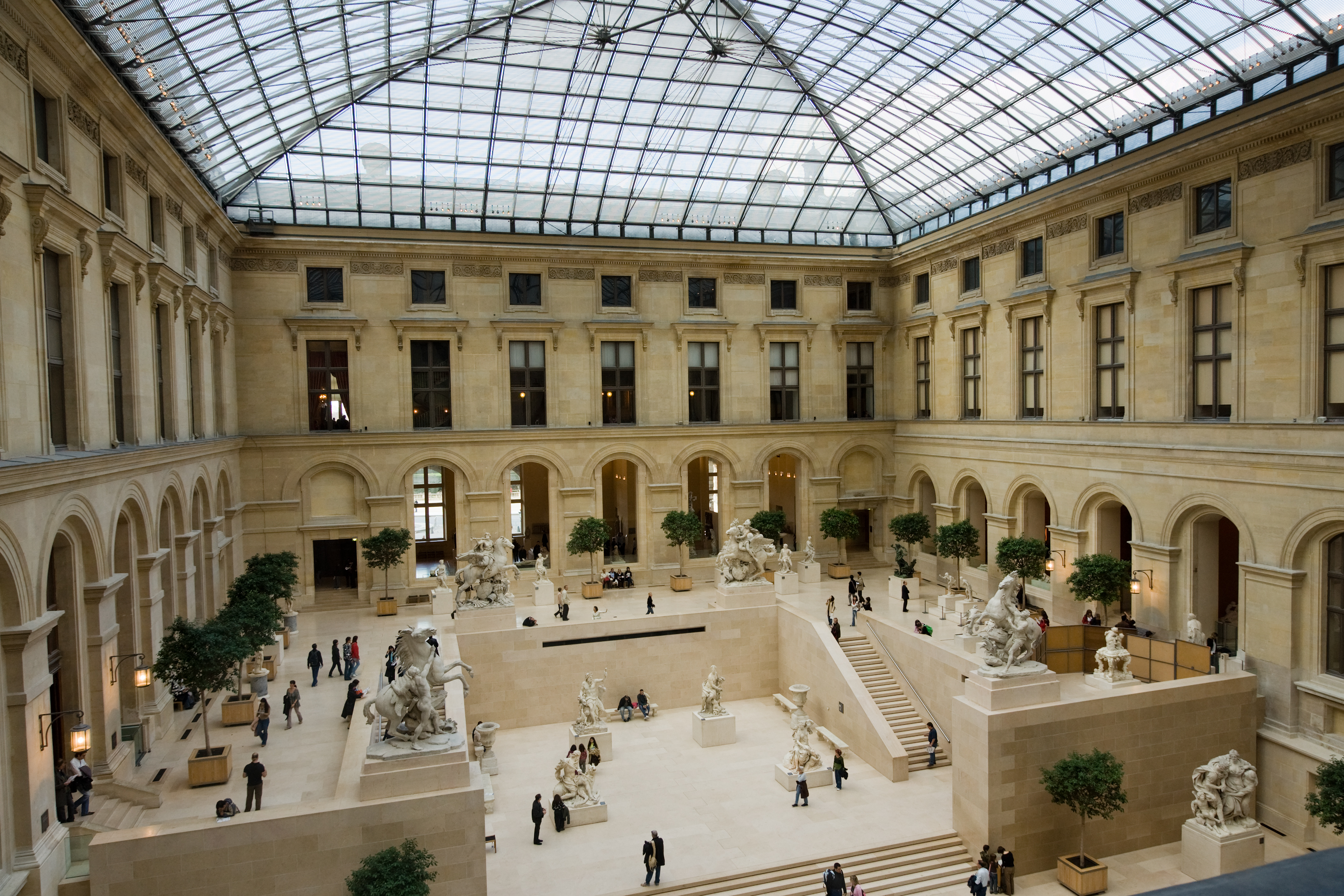
The Cour Marly of the Louvre, where many French sculptures are exhibited

The sculpture department consists of works created before 1850 not belonging in the Etruscan, Greek, and Roman department. The Louvre has been a repository of sculpted material since its time as a palace; however, only ancient architecture was displayed until 1824, except for Michelangelo's Dying Slave and Rebellious Slave. Initially the collection included only 100 pieces, the rest of the royal sculpture collection being at Versailles. It remained small until 1847, when Léon Laborde was given control of the department. Laborde developed the medieval section and purchased the first such statues and sculptures in the collection, King Childebert and stanga door, respectively. The collection was part of the Department of Antiquities but was given autonomy in 1871 under Louis Courajod, a director who organised a wider representation of French works. In 1986, all post-1850 works were relocated to the new Musée d'Orsay. The Grand Louvre project separated the department into two exhibition spaces; the French collection is displayed in the Richelieu Wing, and foreign works in the Denon Wing.

The collection's overview of French sculpture contains Romanesque works such as the 11th-century Daniel in the Lions' Den and the 12th-century Virgin of Auvergne. In the 16th century, Renaissance influence caused French sculpture to become more restrained, as seen in Jean Goujon's bas-reliefs, and Germain Pilon's Descent from the Cross and Resurrection of Christ. The 17th and 18th centuries are represented by Gian Lorenzo Bernini's 1640–1 Bust of Cardinal Richelieu, Étienne Maurice Falconet's Woman Bathing and Amour menaçant, and François Anguier's obelisks. Neoclassical works includes Antonio Canova's Psyche Revived by Cupid's Kiss (1787). The 18th and 19th centuries are represented by the French sculptors like Alfred Barye and Émile Guillemin.

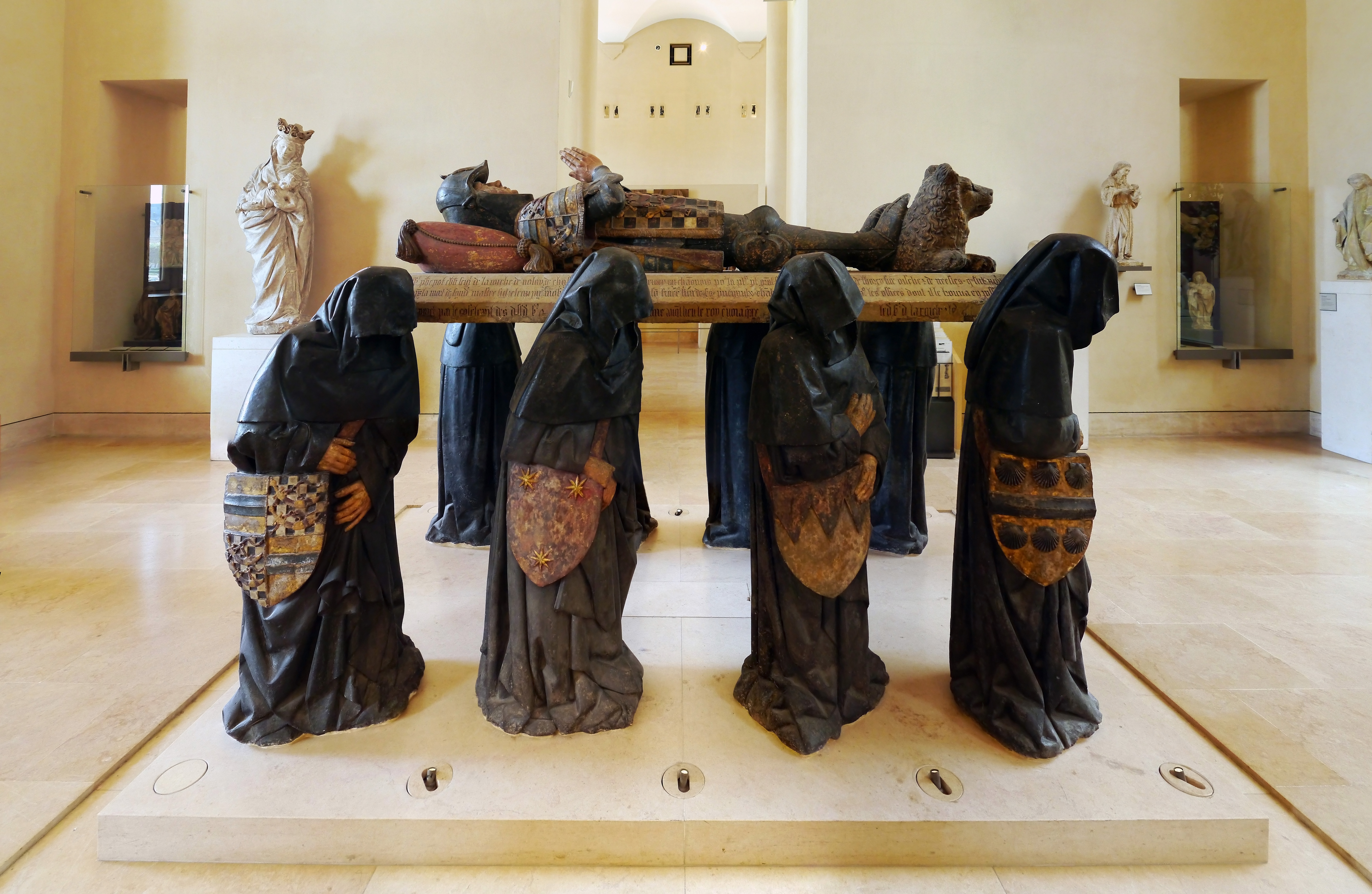
The Tomb of Philippe Pot; 1477 and 1483; limestone, paint, gold and lead; height: 181 cm, width: 260 cm, depth: 167 cm

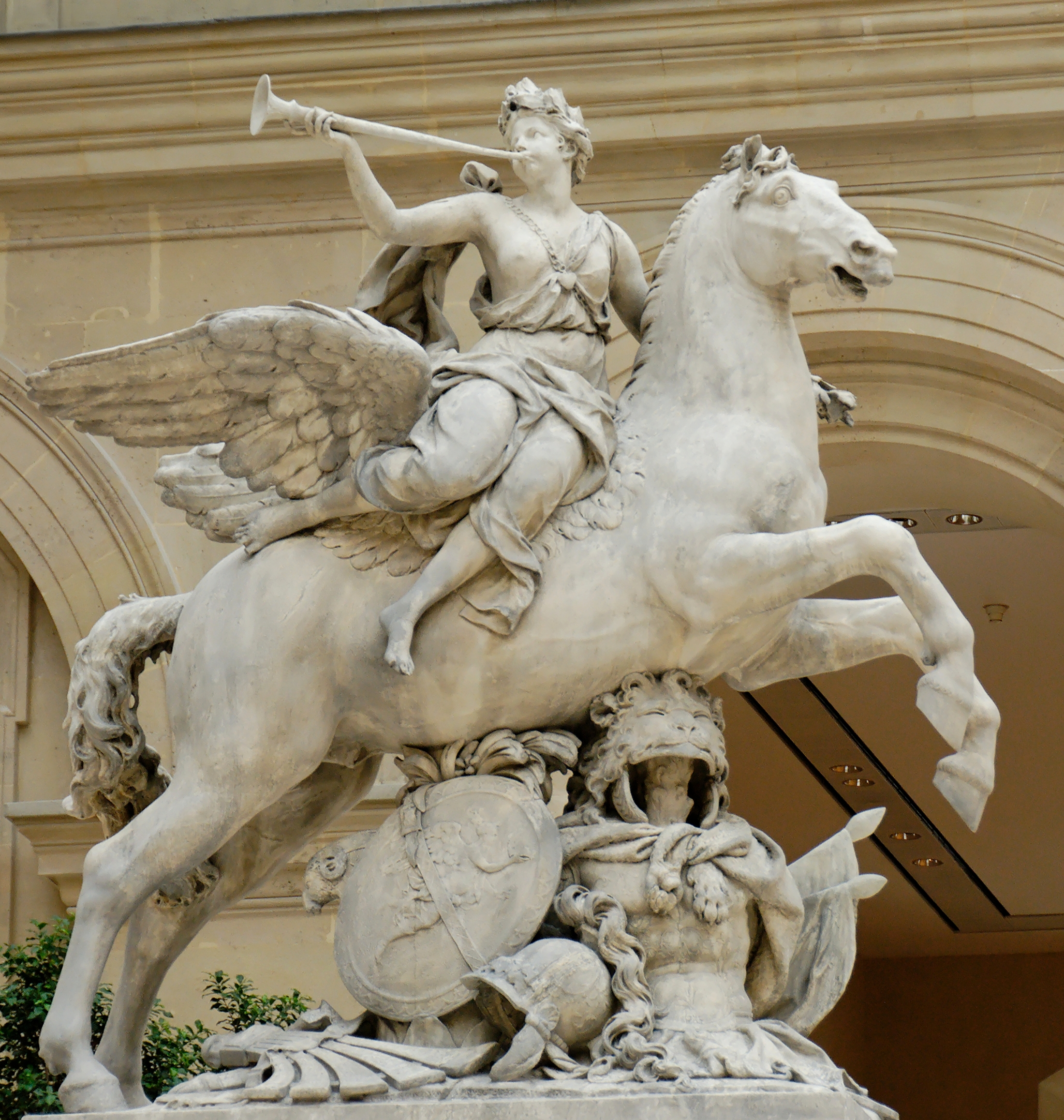
The King's Fame Riding Pegasus; by Antoine Coysevox; 1701–1702; Carrara marble; height: 3.15 m, width: 2.91 m, depth: 1.28 m

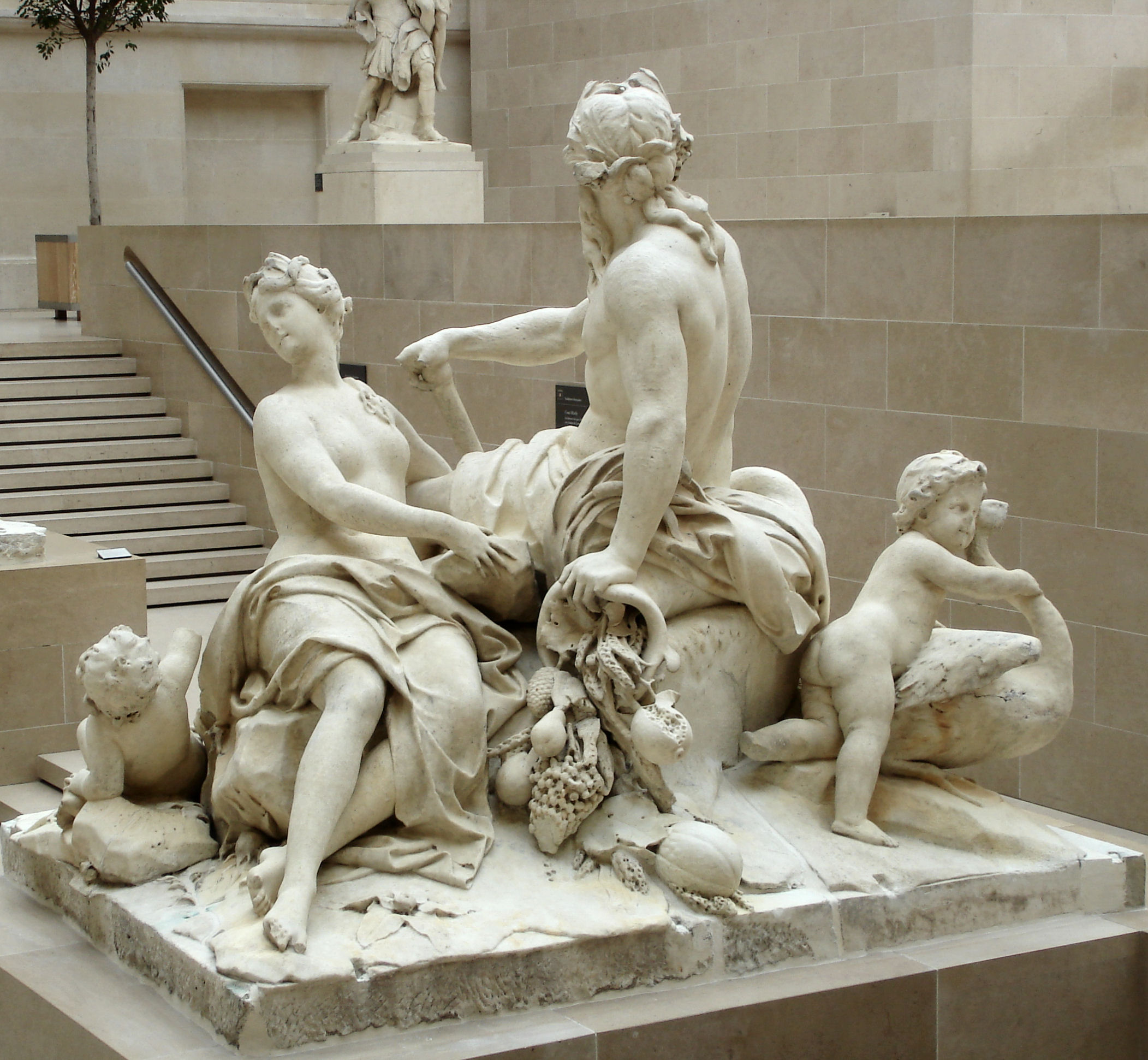
Group sculpture; by Nicolas Coustou; 1701–1712; marble; height: 2.44 m

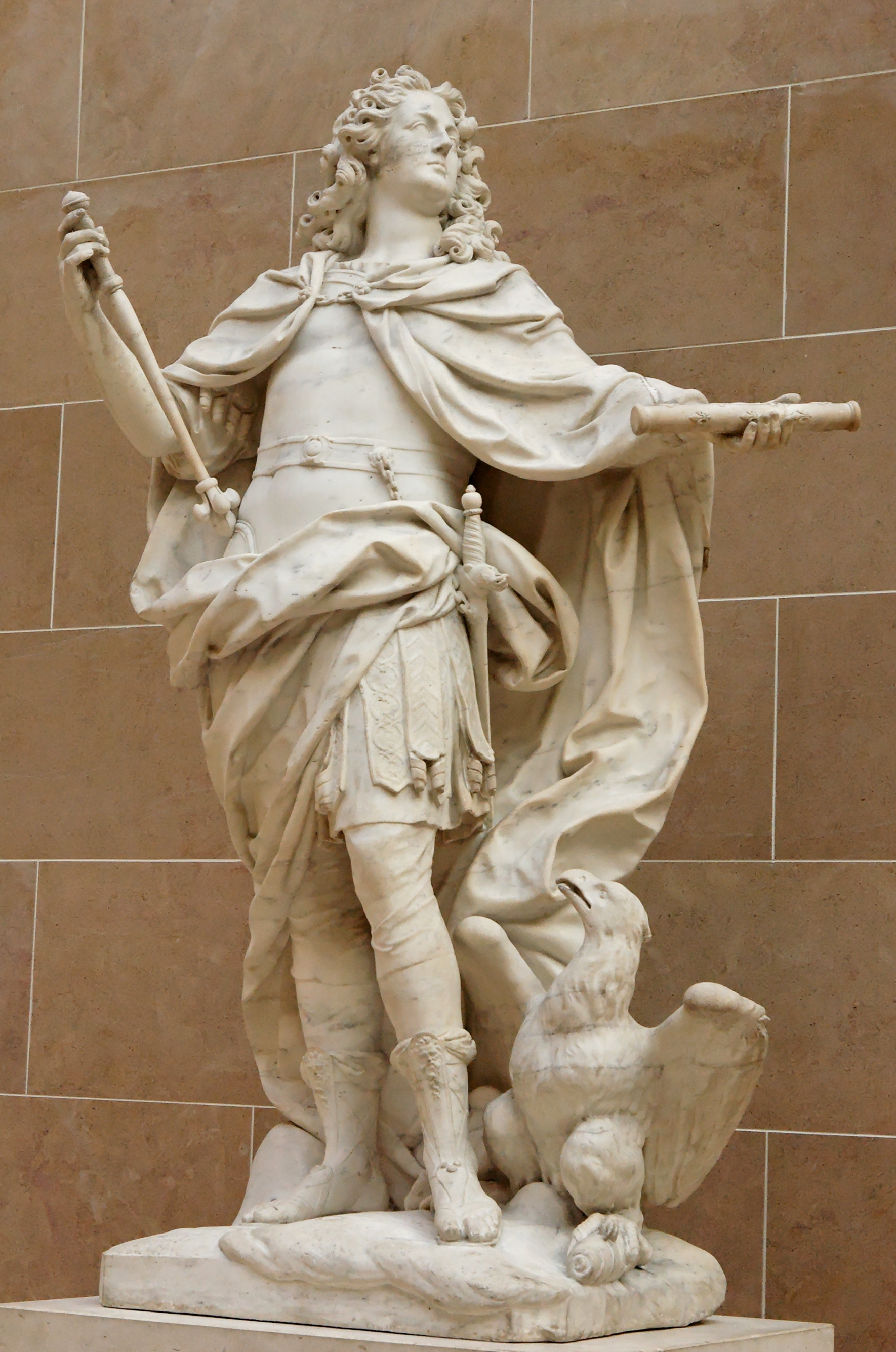
Louis XV as Jupiter; 1731; probably marble; height: 1.95 m, width: 1.20 m, depth: 68 cm

=== Decorative arts ===
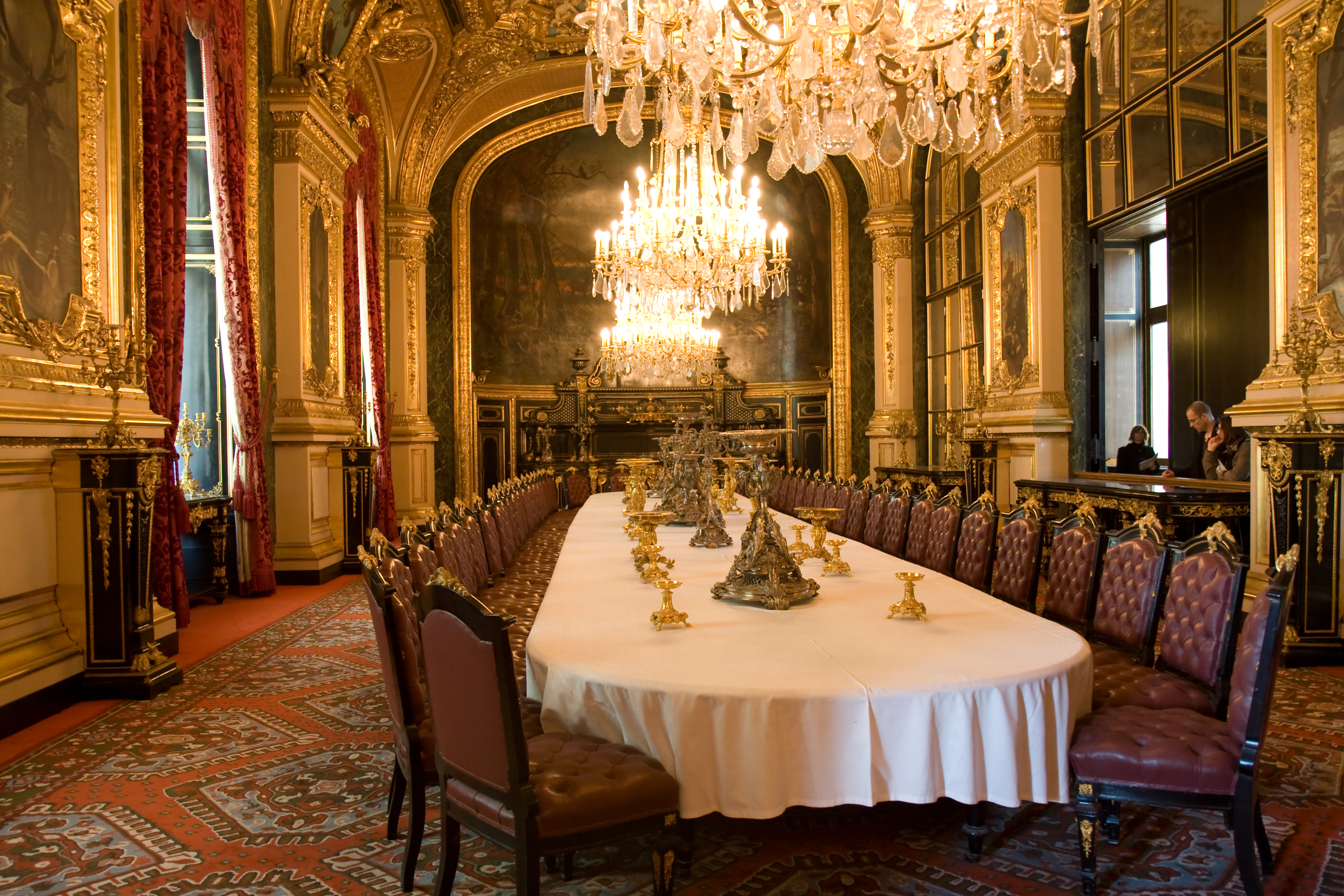
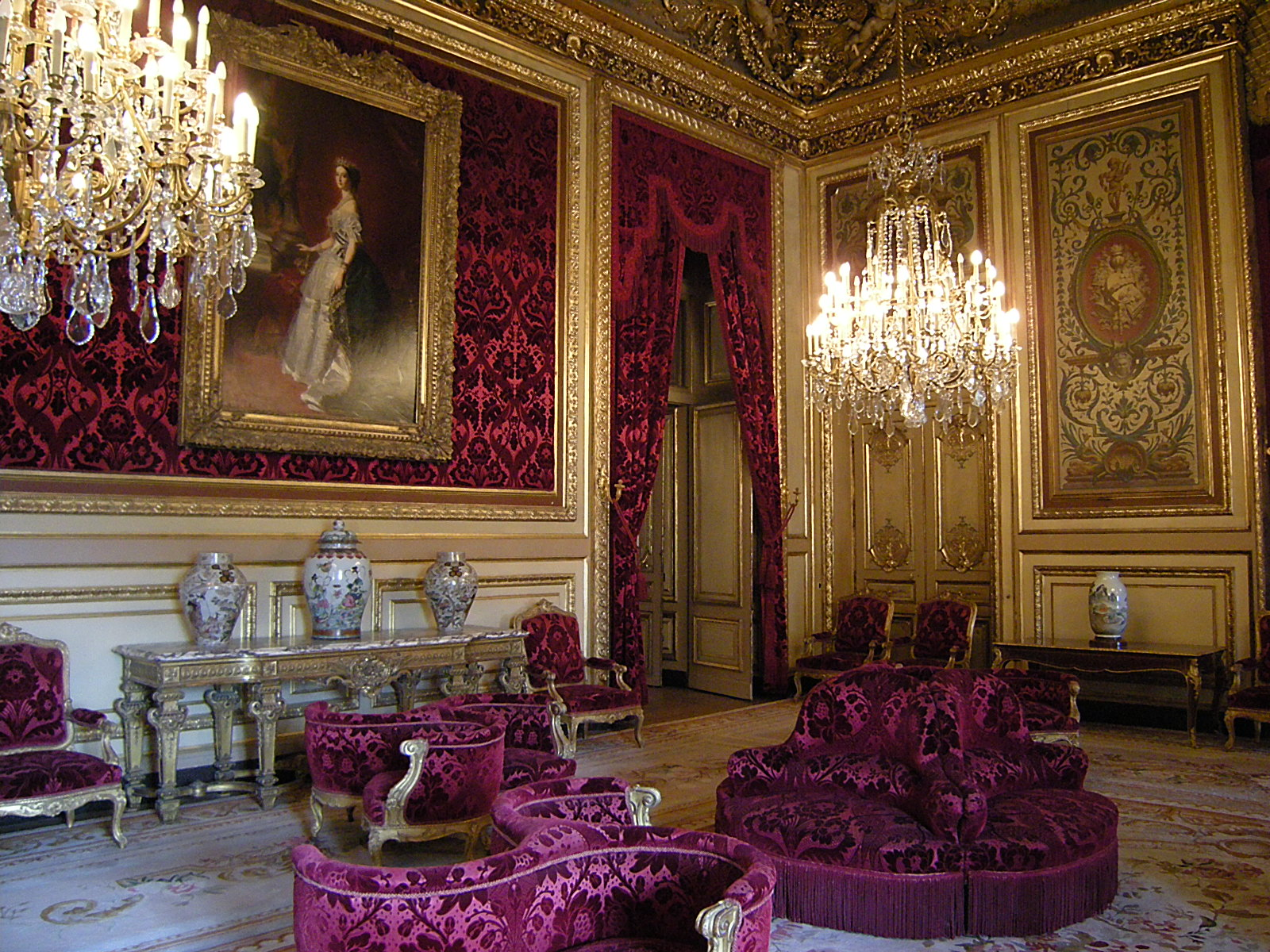
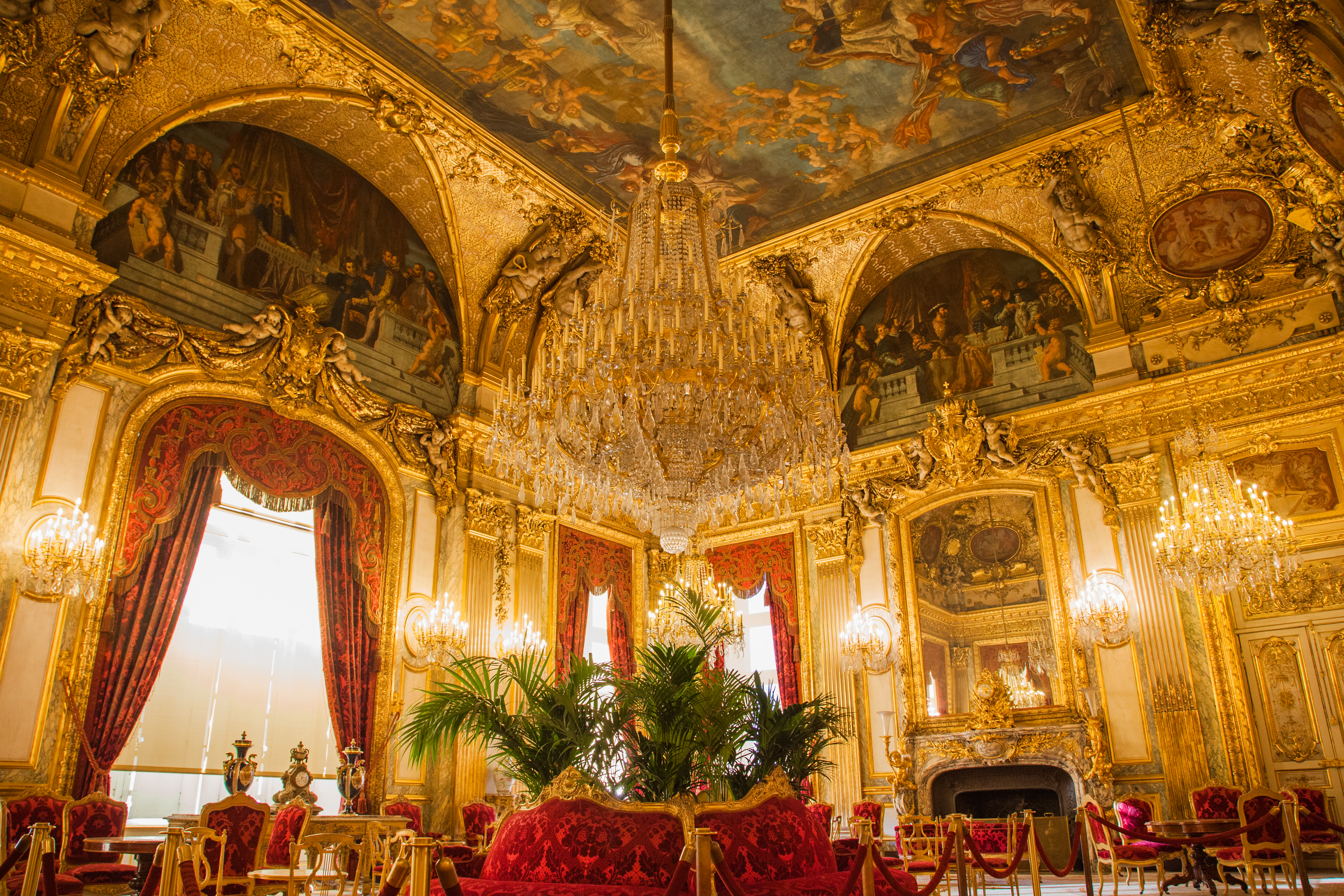
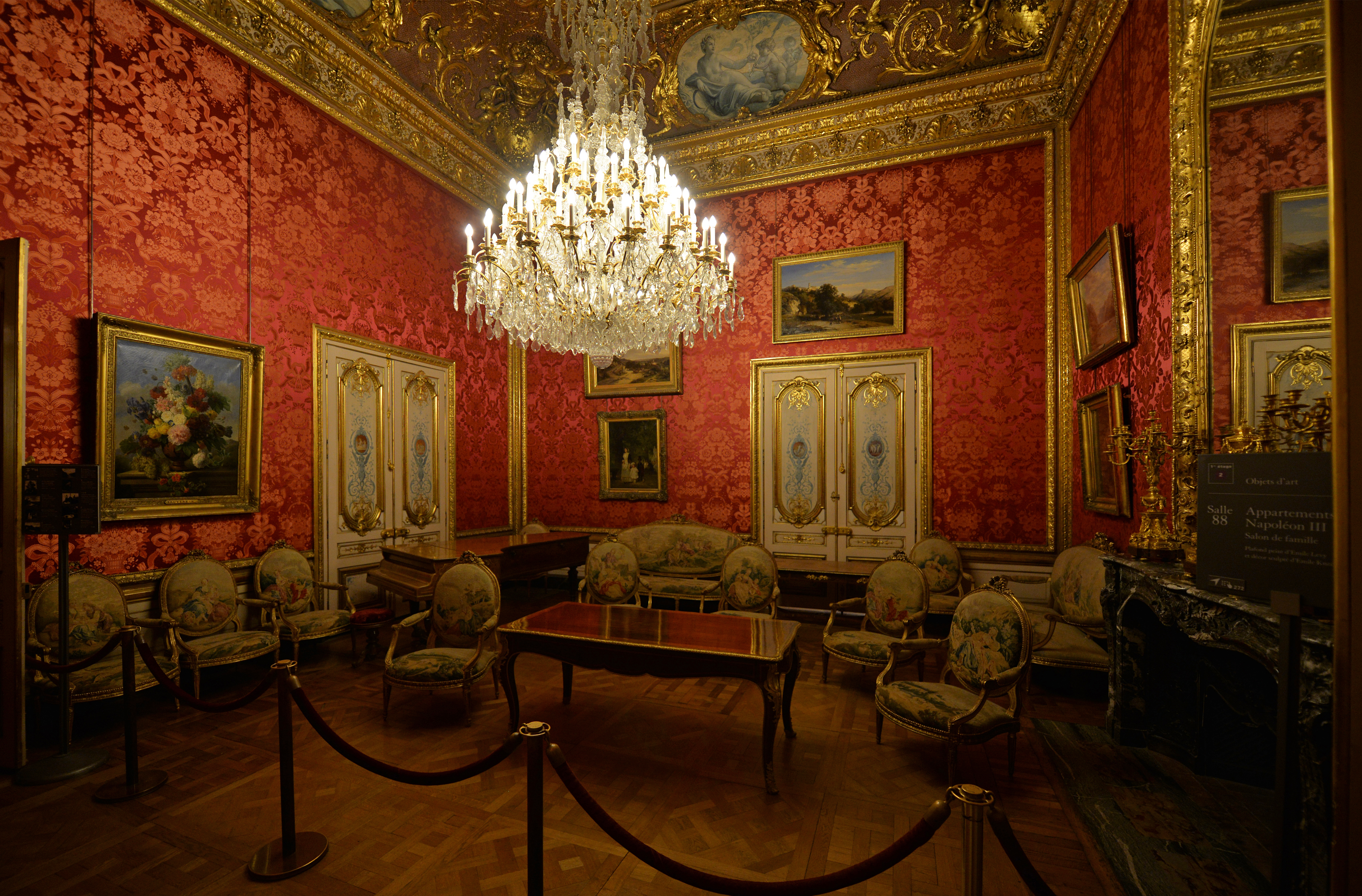
Some of the Second Empire style rooms of the apartments of Napoleon III

The Objets d'art collection spans the time from the Middle Ages to the mid-19th century. The department began as a subset of the sculpture department, based on royal property and the transfer of work from the Basilique Saint-Denis, the burial ground of French monarchs that held the Coronation Sword of the Kings of France. Among the budding collection's most prized works were pietre dure vases and bronzes. The Durand collection's 1825 acquisition added "ceramics, enamels, and stained glass", and 800 pieces were given by Pierre Révoil. The onset of Romanticism rekindled interest in Renaissance and Medieval artwork, and the Sauvageot donation expanded the department with 1,500 middle-age and faïence works. In 1862, the Campana collection added gold jewellery and maiolicas, mainly from the 15th and 16th centuries.

The works are displayed on the Richelieu Wing's first floor and in the Apollo Gallery, named by the painter Charles Le Brun, who was commissioned by Louis XIV (the Sun King) to decorate the space in a solar theme. The medieval collection contains the coronation crown of Louis XV, Charles V's sceptre, and the 12th century porphyry vase. The Renaissance art holdings include Giambologna's bronze Nessus and Deianira and the tapestry Maximillian's Hunt. From later periods, highlights include Madame de Pompadour's Sèvres vase collection and Napoleon III's apartments.

In September 2000, the Louvre Museum dedicated the Gilbert Chagoury and Rose-Marie Chagoury Gallery to display tapestries donated by the Chagourys, including a 16th-century six-part tapestry suite, sewn with gold and silver threads representing sea divinities, which was commissioned in Paris for Colbert de Seignelay, Secretary of State for the Navy.

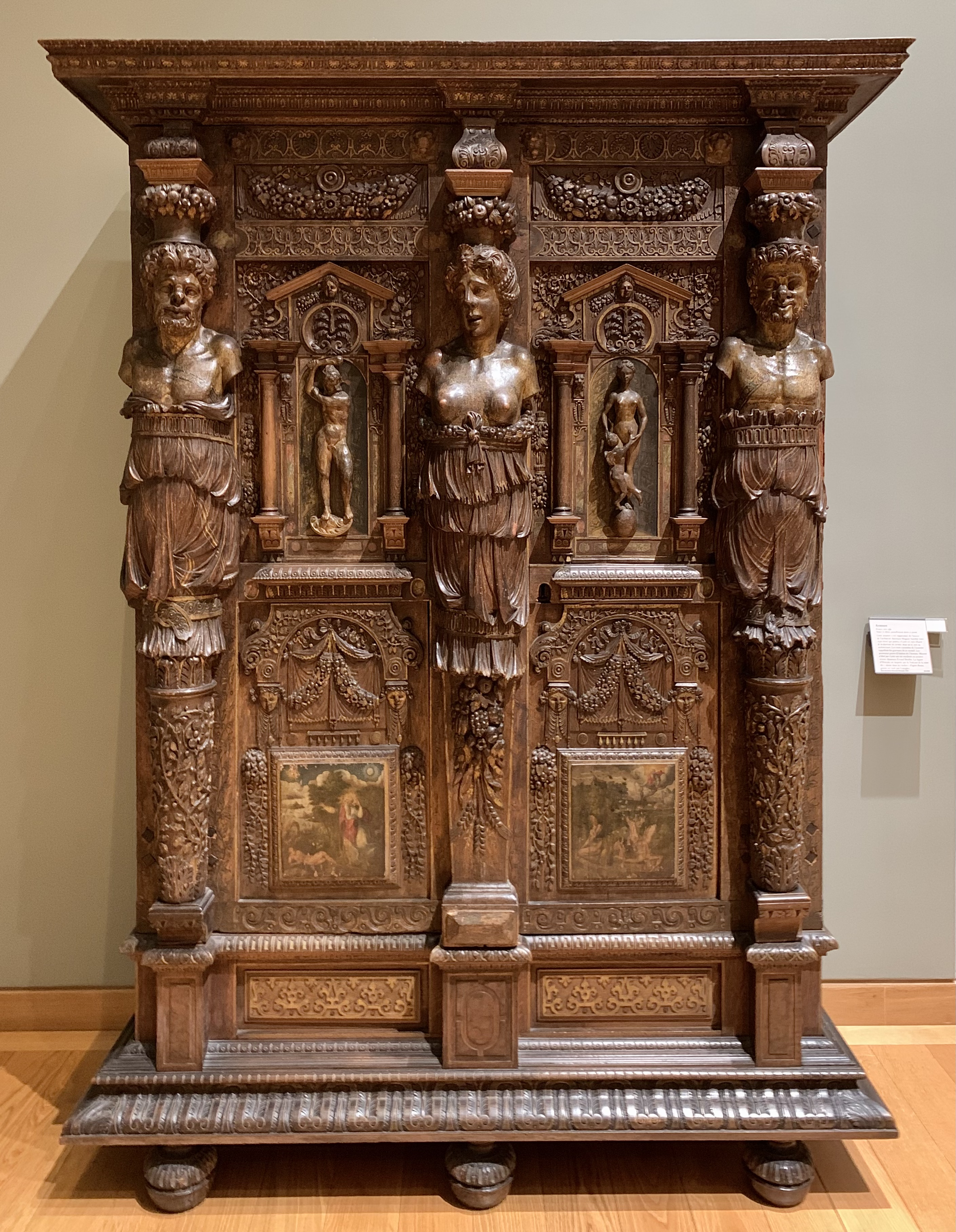
Henry II style wardrobe; c. 1580; walnut and oak, partially gilded and painted; height: 2.06 m, width: 1.50 m, depth: 0.60 m

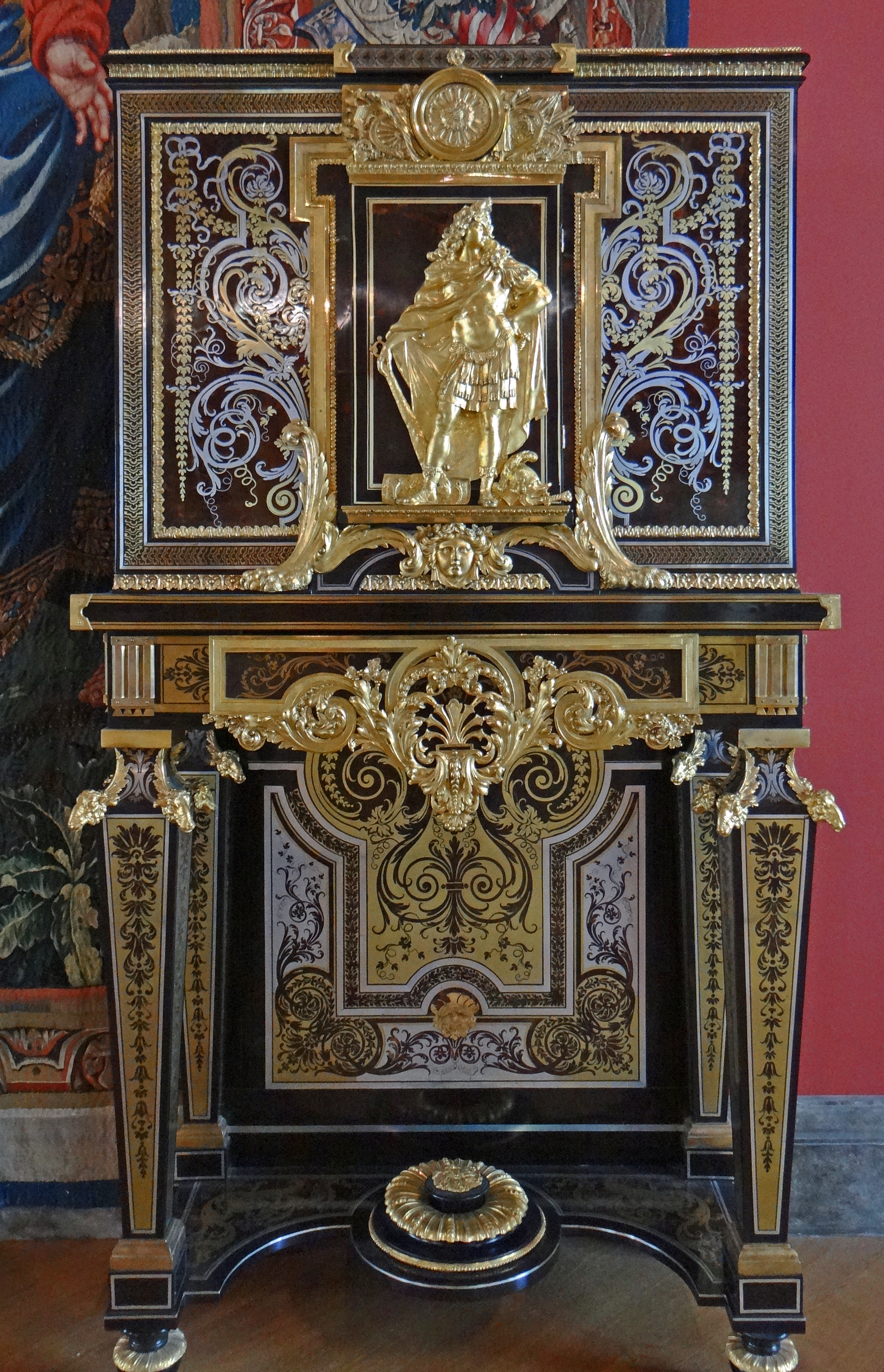
Louis XIV style cabinet on stand; by André Charles Boulle; c. 1690–1710; oak frame, resinous wood and walnut, ebony veneer, tortoiseshell, brass and pewter marquetry, and ormolu

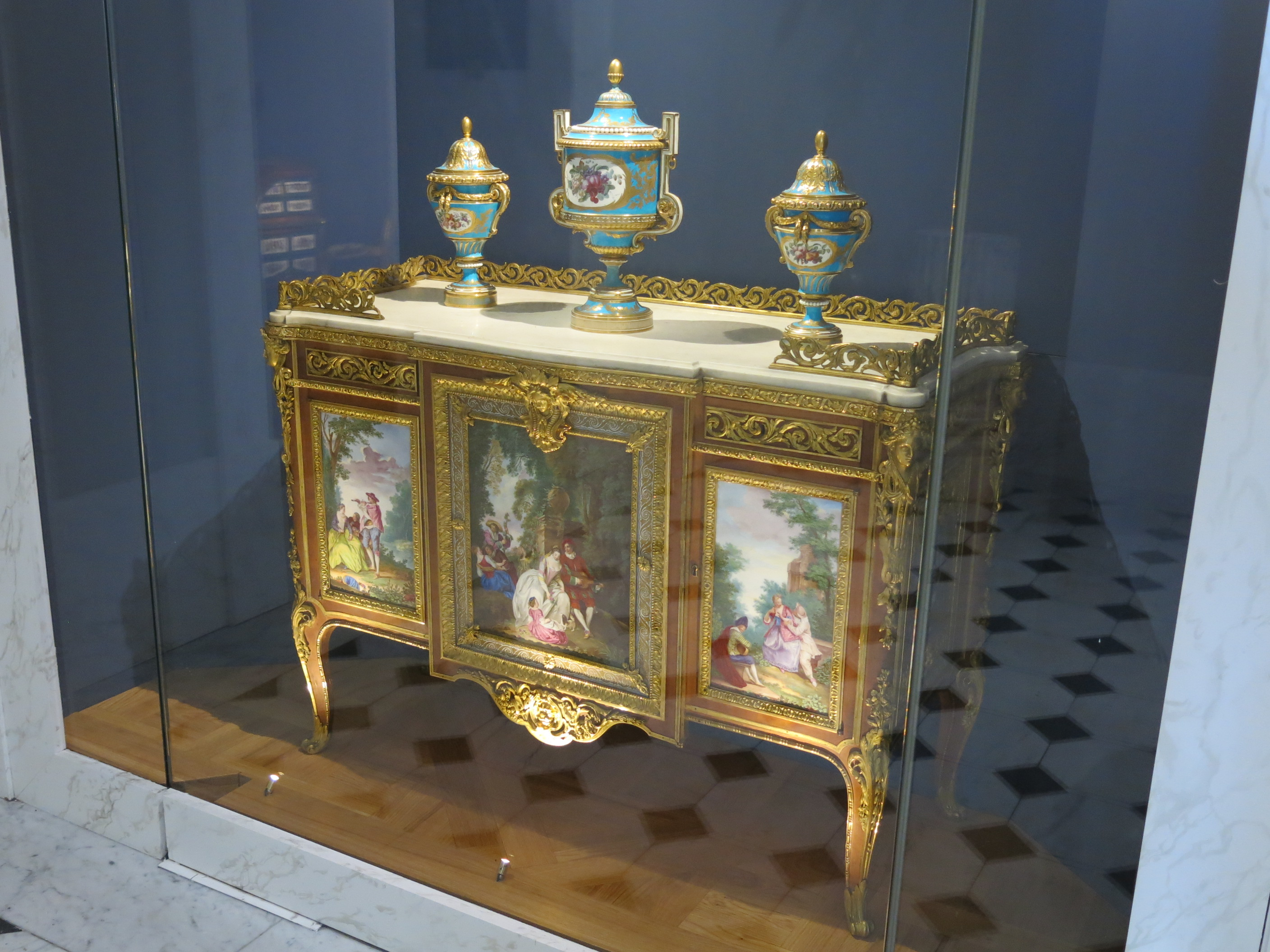
Louis XVI style commode of Madame du Barry; 1772; oak frame, veneer of pearwood, rosewood and kingwood, soft-paste Sèvres porcelain, gilded bronze, white marble, and glass; height: 0.87 m, width: 1.19 m, depth: 0.48 m

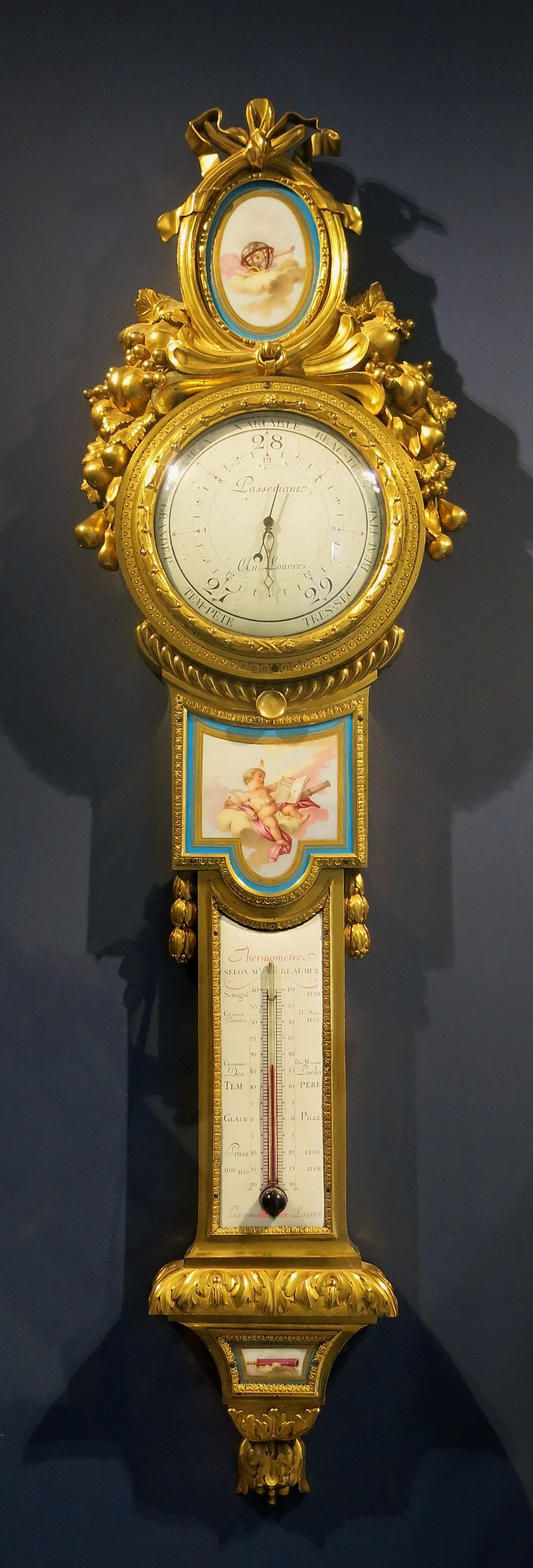
Louis XVI style barometer-thermometer; c. 1776; soft-paste Sèvres porcelain, enamel, and ormolu; height: 1 m, width: 0.27 m

=== Painting ===
Mona Lisa; by Leonardo da Vinci, c. 1503–1506, perhaps continuing until c. 1517; oil on poplar panel; 77 cm × 53 cm

The painting collection has more than 7,500 works from the 13th century to 1848 and is managed by 12 curators who oversee the collection's display. Nearly two-thirds are by French artists, and more than 1,200 are Northern European. The Italian paintings compose most of the remnants of Francis I and Louis XIV's collections, others are unreturned artwork from the Napoleon era, and some were bought. The collection began with Francis, who acquired works from Italian masters such as Raphael and Michelangelo and brought Leonardo da Vinci to his court. After the French Revolution, the Royal Collection formed the nucleus of the Louvre. When the d'Orsay train station was converted into the Musée d'Orsay in 1986, the collection was split, and pieces completed after the 1848 Revolution were moved to the new museum. French and Northern European works are in the Richelieu Wing and Cour Carrée; Spanish and Italian paintings are on the first floor of the Denon Wing.

Exemplifying the French School are the early Avignon Pietà of Enguerrand Quarton; the anonymous painting of King Jean le Bon (c. 1360), possibly the oldest independent portrait in Western painting to survive from the postclassical era; Hyacinthe Rigaud's Louis XIV; Jacques-Louis David's The Coronation of Napoleon; Théodore Géricault's The Raft of the Medusa; and Eugène Delacroix's Liberty Leading the People. Nicolas Poussin, the Le Nain brothers, Philippe de Champaigne, Le Brun, La Tour, Watteau, Fragonard, Ingres, Corot, and Delacroix are well represented.

Northern European works include Johannes Vermeer's The Lacemaker and The Astronomer; Caspar David Friedrich's The Tree of Crows; Rembrandt's The Supper at Emmaus, Bathsheba at Her Bath, and The Slaughtered Ox.

The Italian holdings are notable, particularly the Renaissance collection. The works include Andrea Mantegna and Giovanni Bellini's Calvarys, which reflect realism and detail "meant to depict the significant events of a greater spiritual world". The High Renaissance collection includes Leonardo da Vinci's Mona Lisa, Virgin and Child with St. Anne, St. John the Baptist, and Madonna of the Rocks. The Baroque collection includes Giambattista Pittoni's The Continence of Scipio, Susanna and the Elders, Bacchus and Ariadne, Mars and Venus, and others Caravaggio is represented by The Fortune Teller and Death of the Virgin. From 16th century Venice, the Louvre displays Titian's Le Concert Champetre, The Entombment, and The Crowning with Thorns.

The La Caze Collection, a bequest to the Musée du Louvre in 1869 by Louis La Caze, was the largest contribution of a person in the history of the Louvre. La Caze gave 584 paintings of his personal collection to the museum. The bequest included Antoine Watteau's Commedia dell'arte player of Pierrot ("Gilles"). In 2007, this bequest was the topic of the exhibition "1869: Watteau, Chardin... entrent au Louvre. La collection La Caze".

Some of the best known paintings of the museum have been digitised by the French Centre for Research and Restoration of Museums of France.

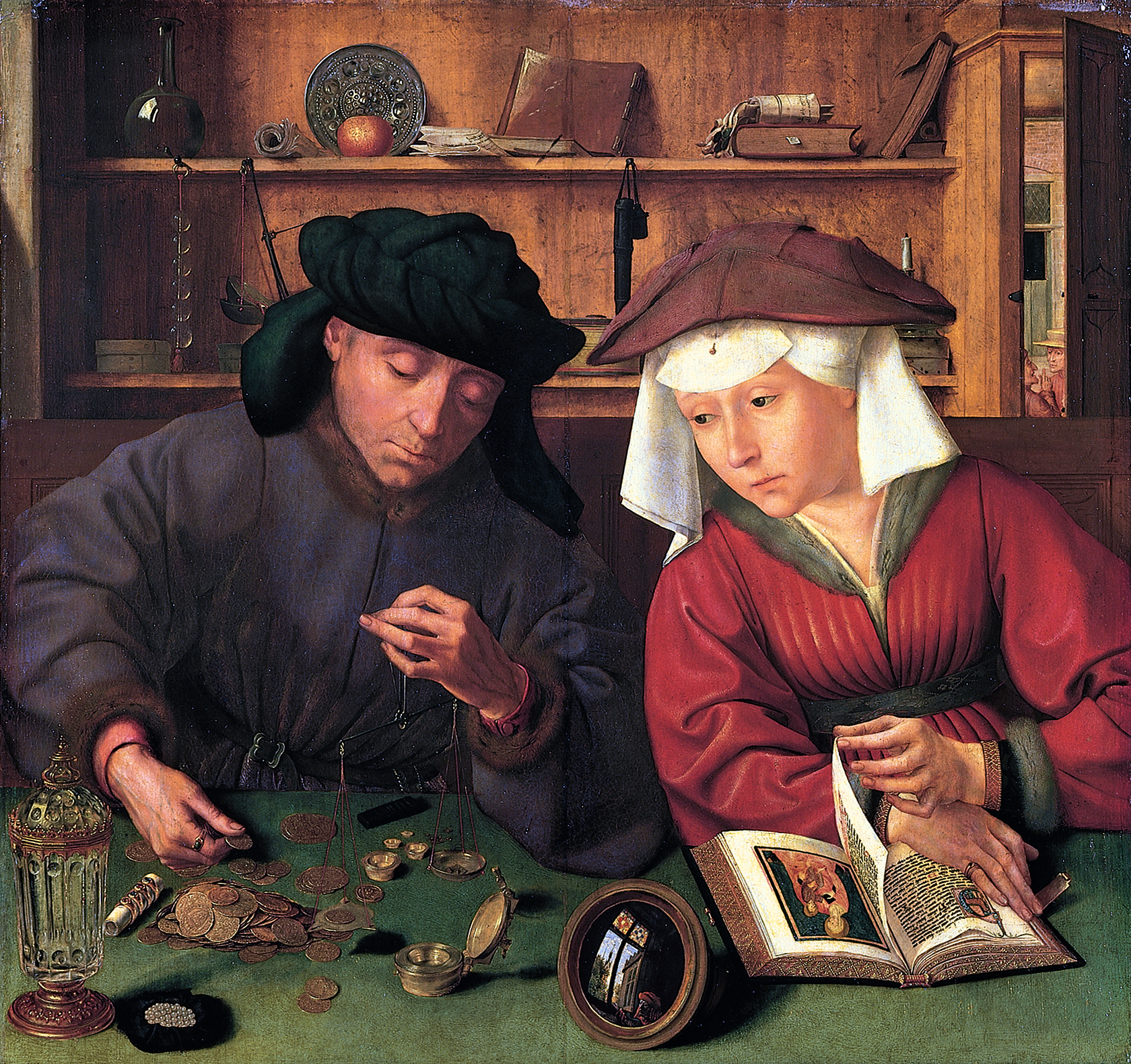
The Money Changer and His Wife; by Quentin Massys; 1514; oil on panel; 70.5 × 67 cm

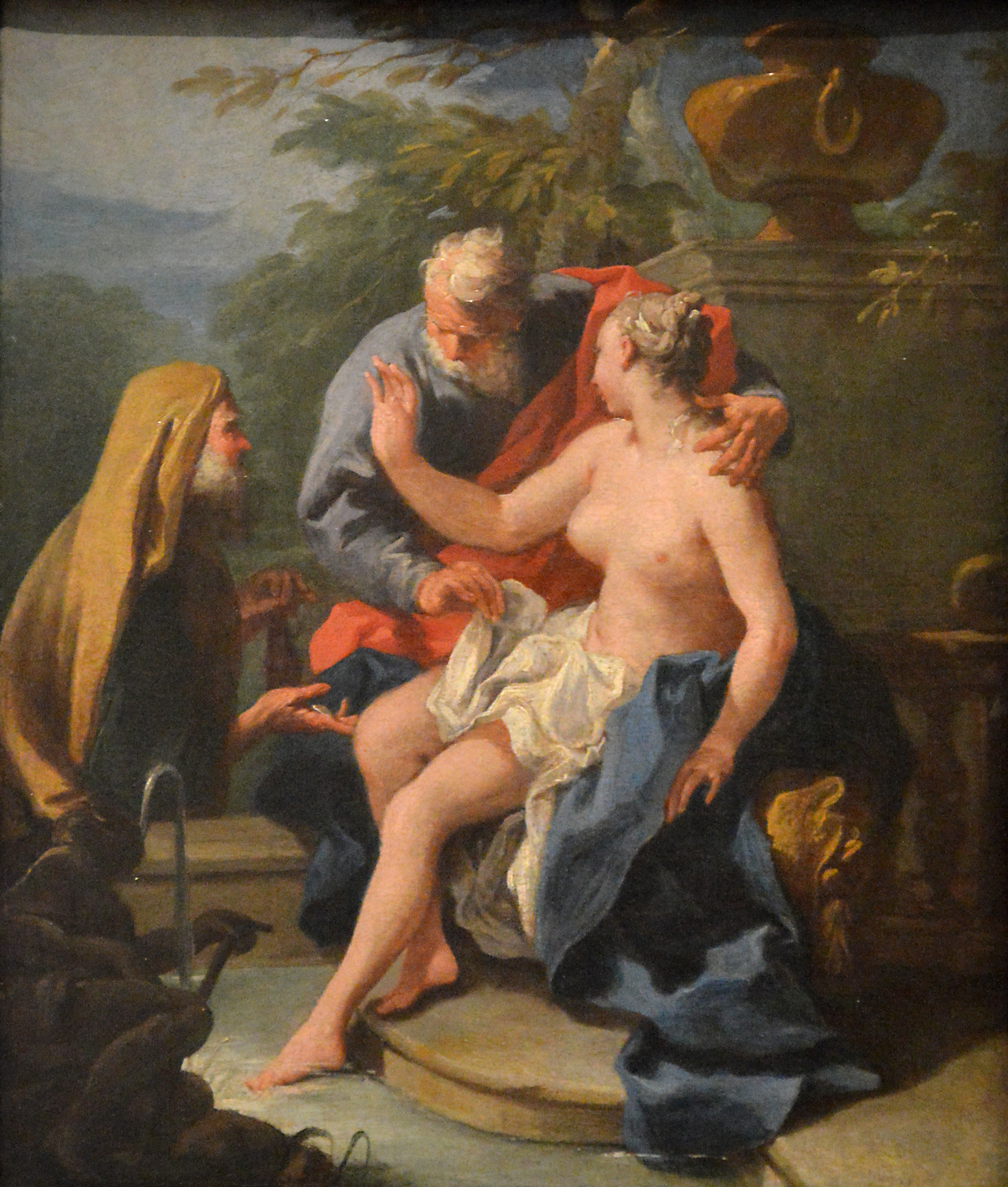
Susanna and the Elders; by Giambattista Pittoni; 1720; oil on panel; 37 × 46 cm

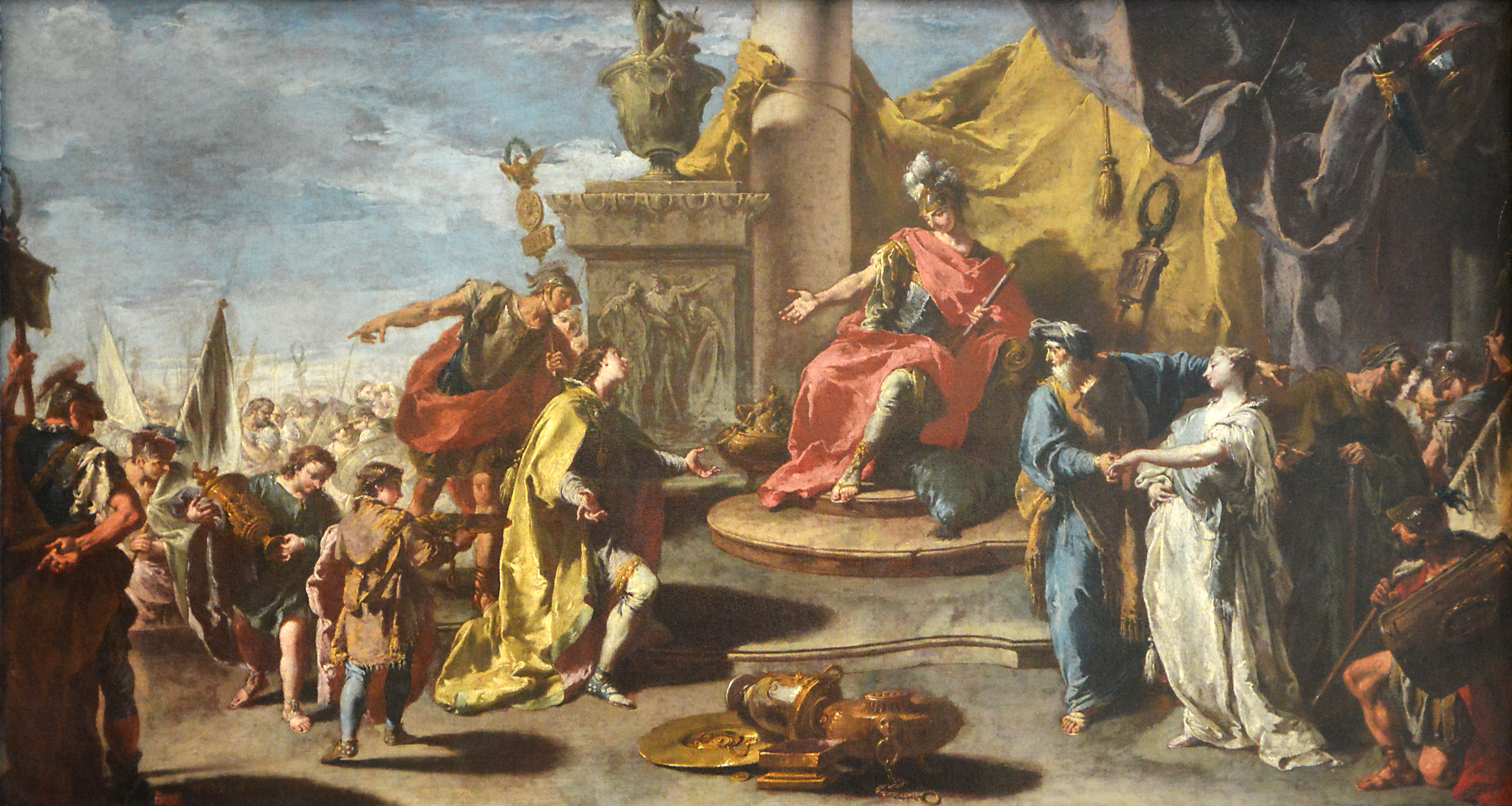
The Continence of Scipio; by Giambattista Pittoni; 1733; oil on panel; 96 × 56 cm

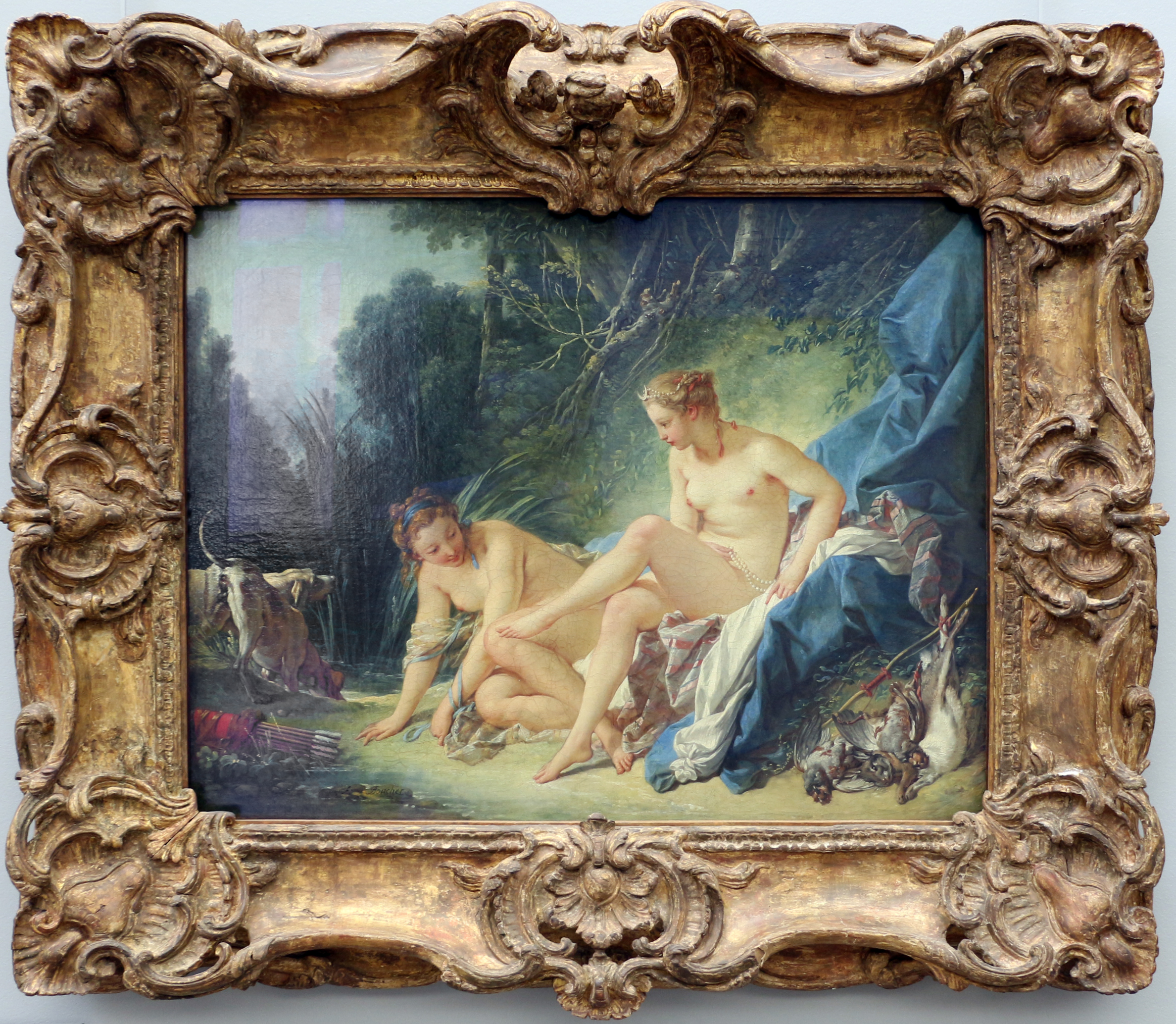
Diana after the Bath; by François Boucher; 1742; oil on canvas; 73 × 56 cm

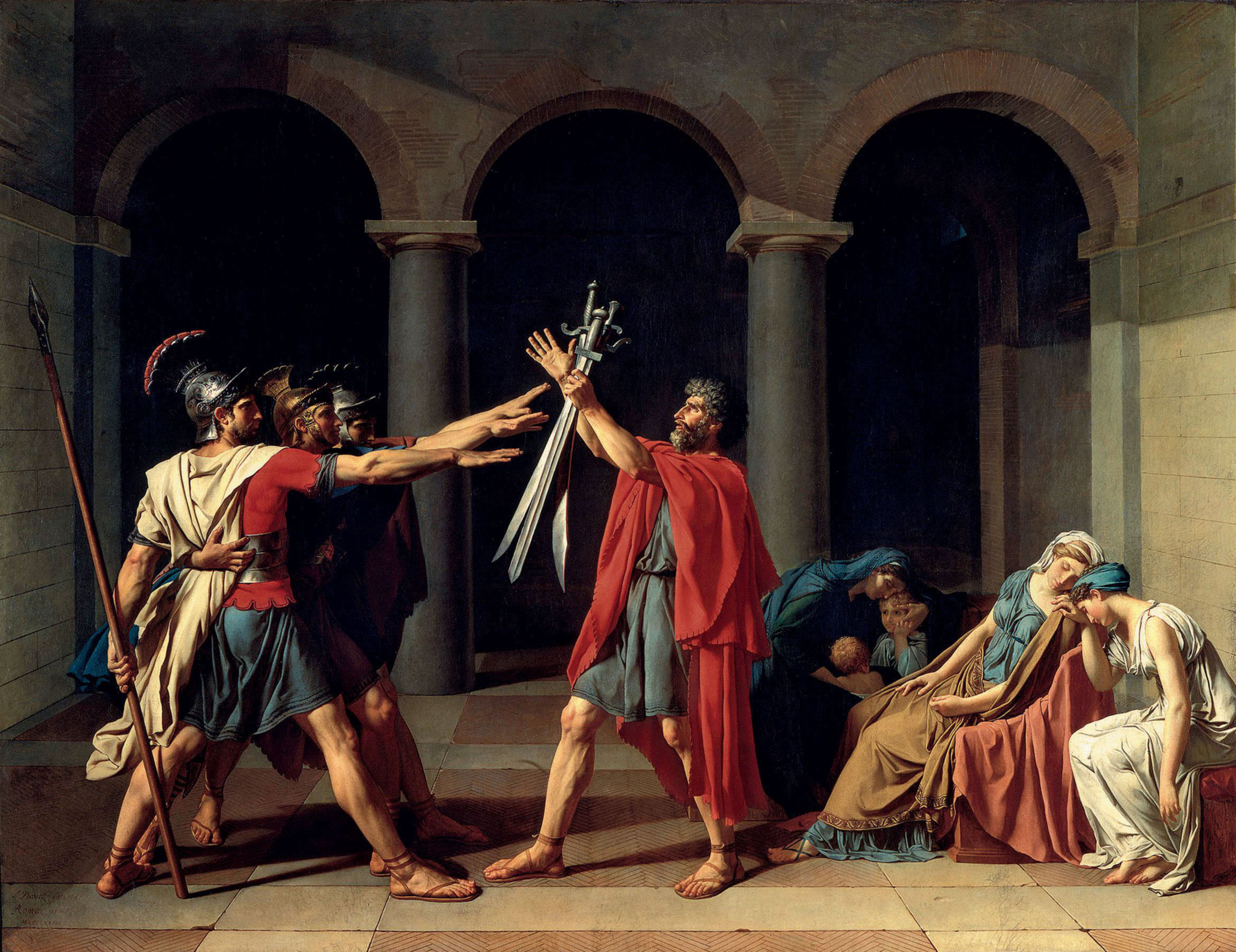
Oath of the Horatii; by Jacques-Louis David; 1784; oil on canvas; height: 330 cm, width: 425 cm

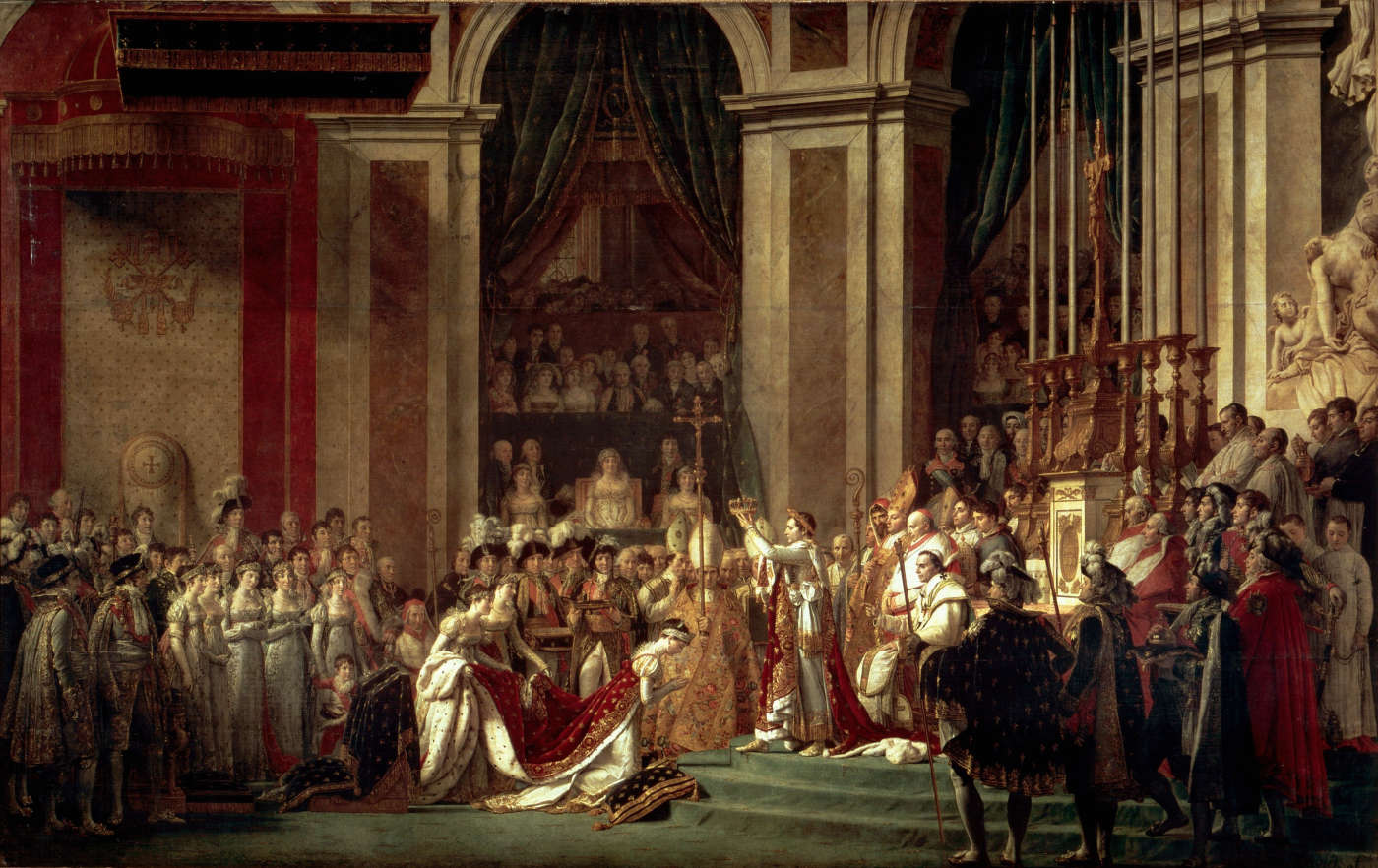
The Coronation of Napoleon by Jacques-Louis David

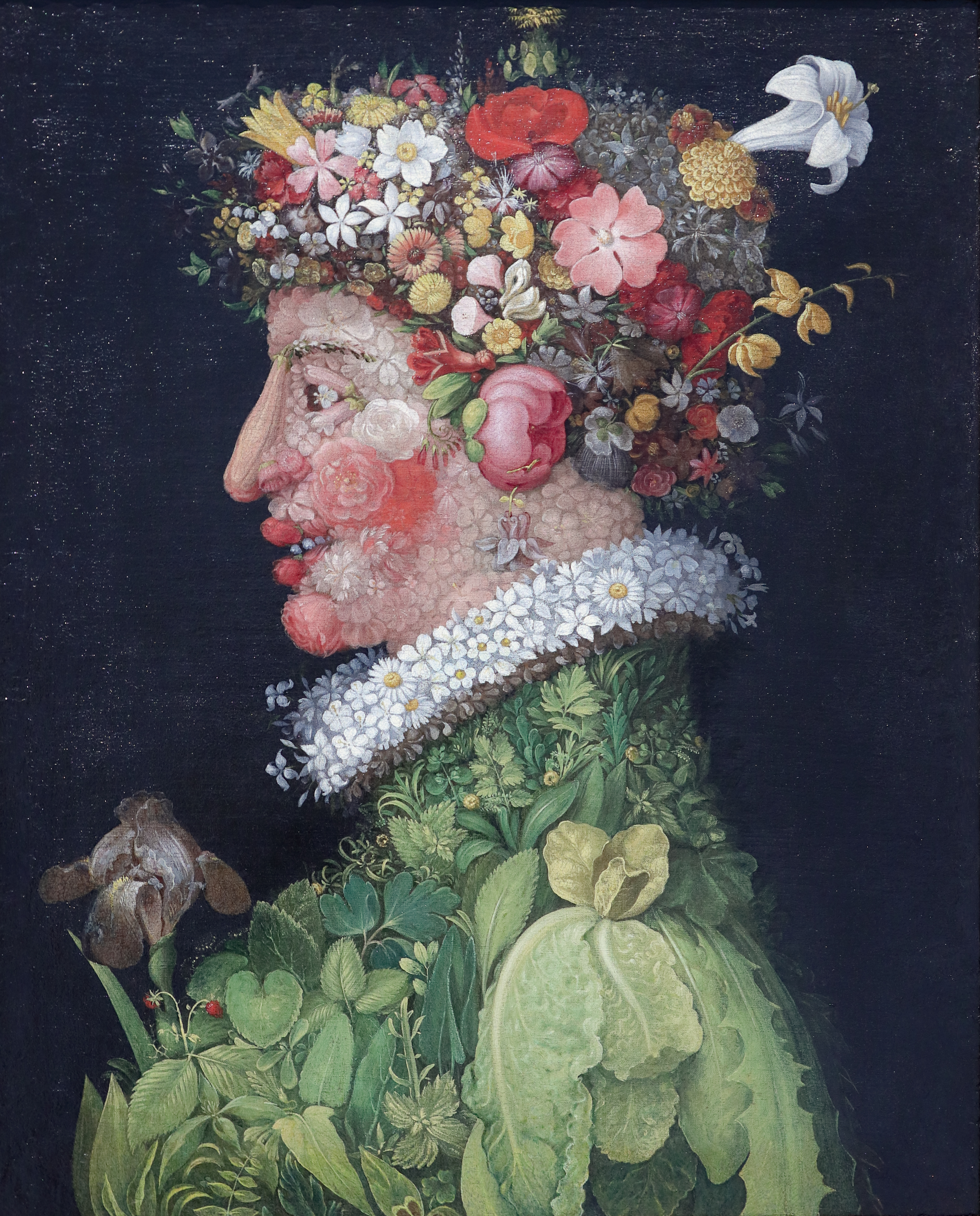
Spring; by Giuseppe Arcimboldo; 1573; oil on canvas; 76 × 64 cm
Paintings by Leonardo da Vinci purchased by François I

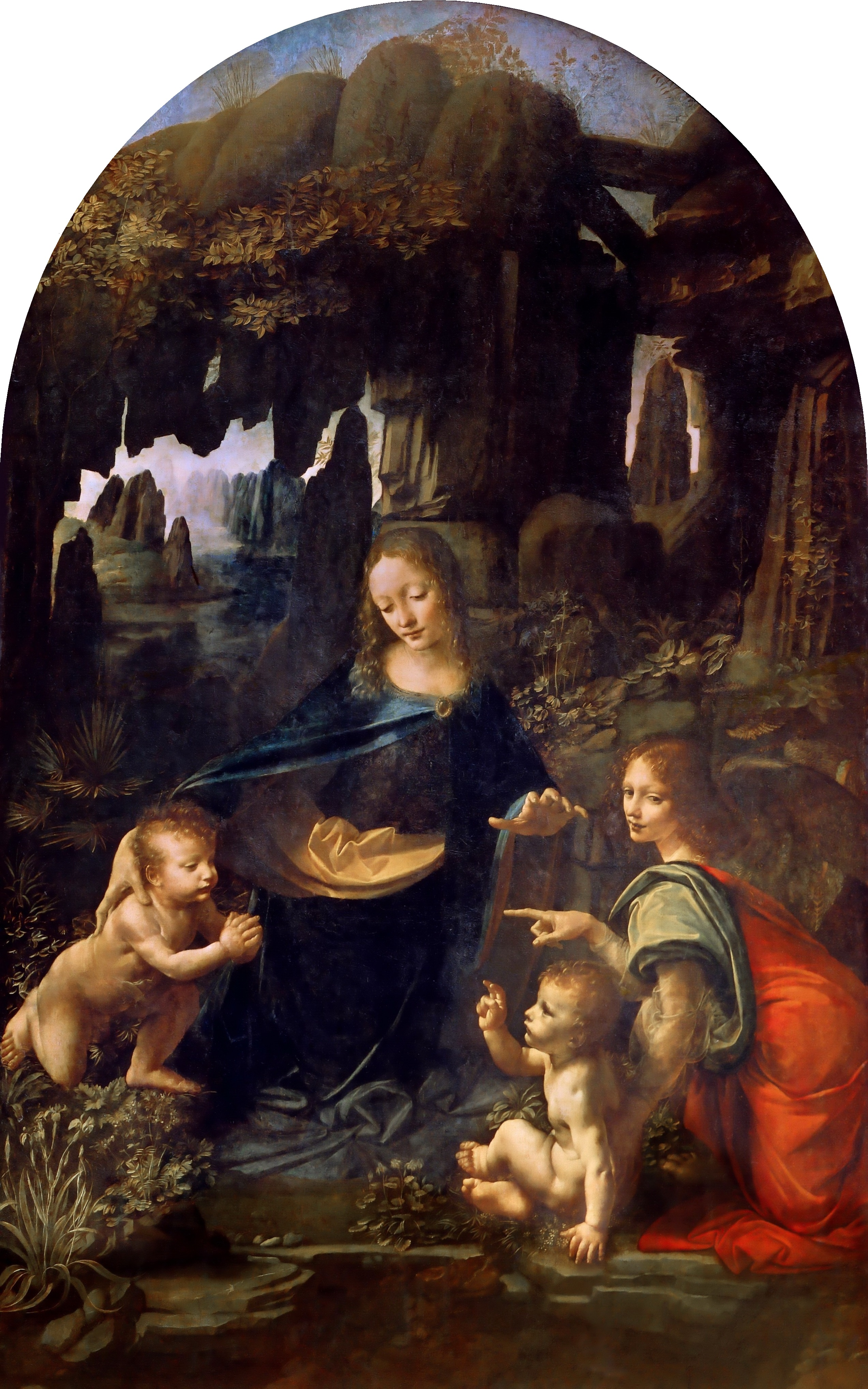
Virgin of the Rocks

The Virgin and Child with Saint Anne (Leonardo)

=== Prints and drawings ===
The prints and drawings department encompasses works on paper. The origins of the collection were the 8,600 works in the Royal Collection (Cabinet du Roi), which were increased via state appropriation, purchases such as the 1,200 works from Fillipo Baldinucci's collection in 1806, and donations. The department opened on 5 August 1797, with 415 pieces displayed in the Galerie d'Apollon. The collection is organised into three sections: the core Cabinet du Roi, 14,000 royal copper printing-plates, and the donations of Edmond de Rothschild, which include 40,000 prints, 3,000 drawings, and 5,000 illustrated books. The holdings are displayed in the Pavillon de Flore; due to the fragility of the paper medium, only a portion are displayed at one time.

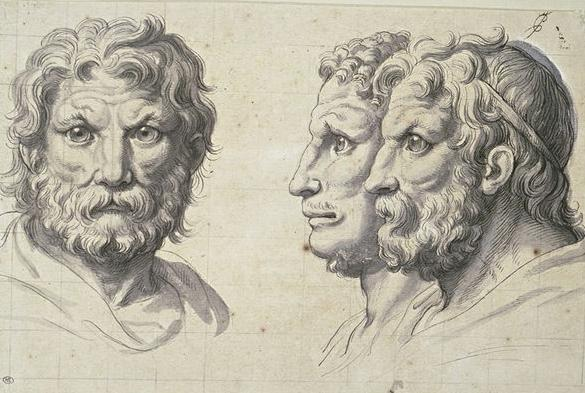
Three lion-like heads; by Charles Le Brun; c. 1671; black chalk, pen and ink, brush and grey wash, white gouache on paper; 21.7 × 32.7 cm

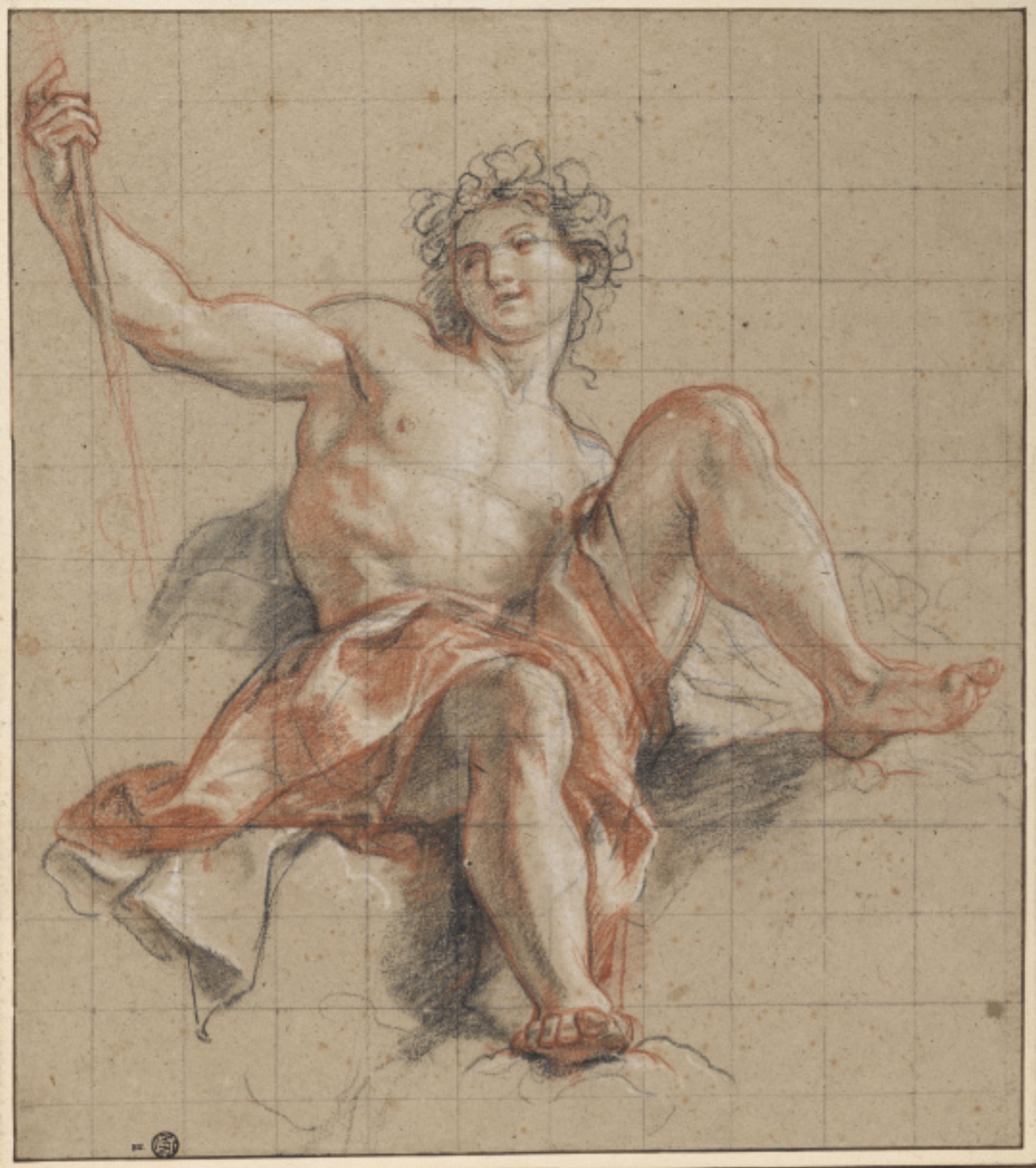
Bacchus; by Antoine Coypel; black chalk, white highlights, and sanguine; 42.7 × 37.7 cm

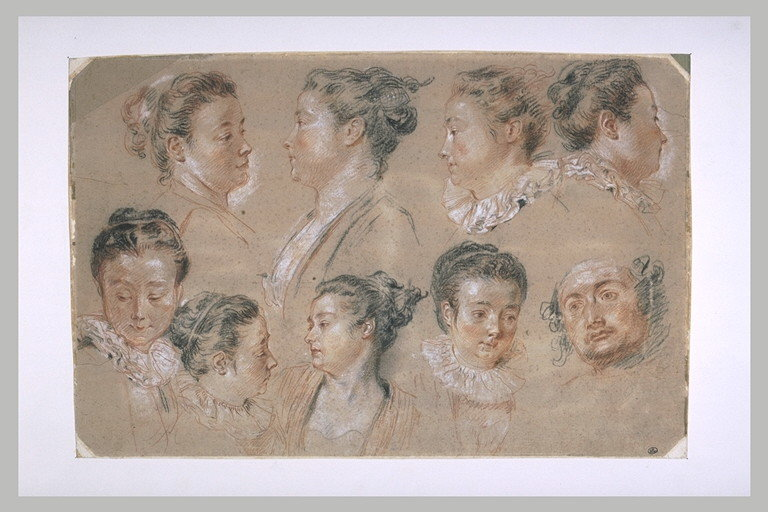
Studies of Women's Heads and a Man's Head; by Antoine Watteau; first half of the 18th century; sanguine, black chalk and white chalk on grey paper; 28 × 38.1 cm

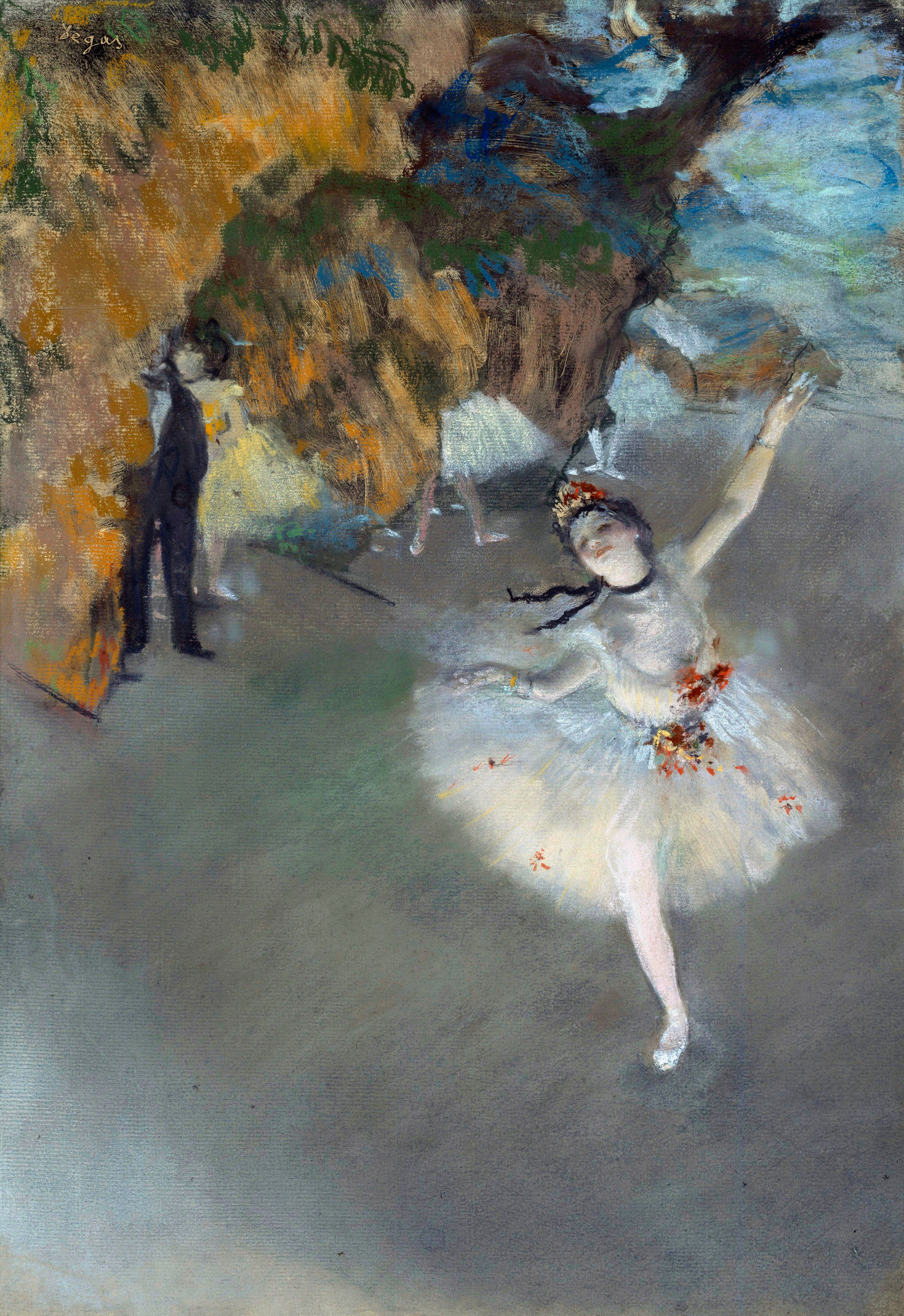
Danseuse sur la scène; by Edgar Degas; pastel; 58 × 42 cm

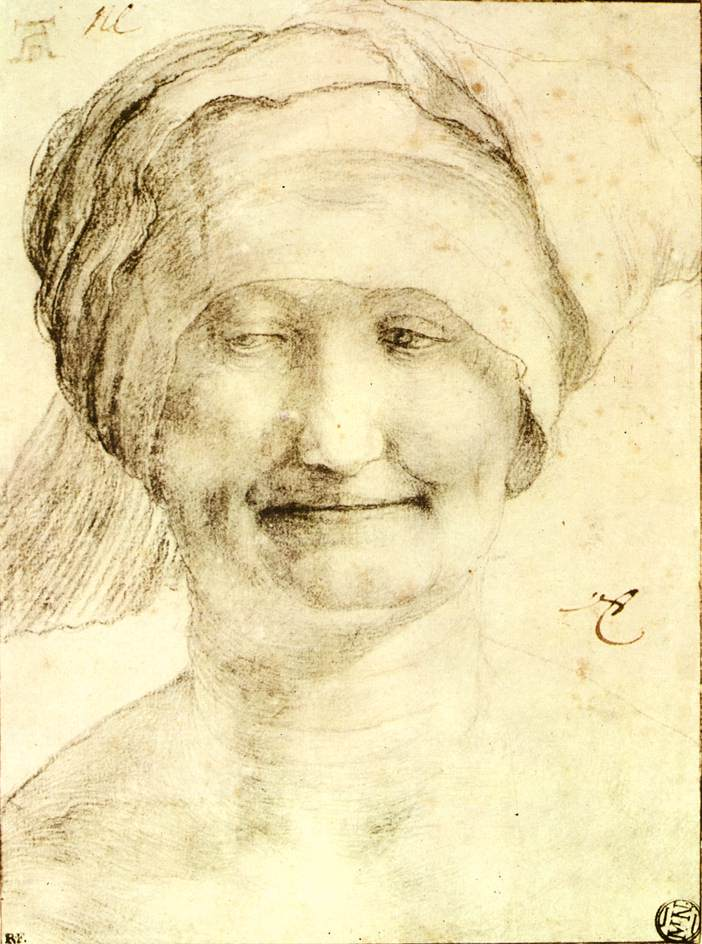
Portrait of elderly woman, by Matthias Grünewald

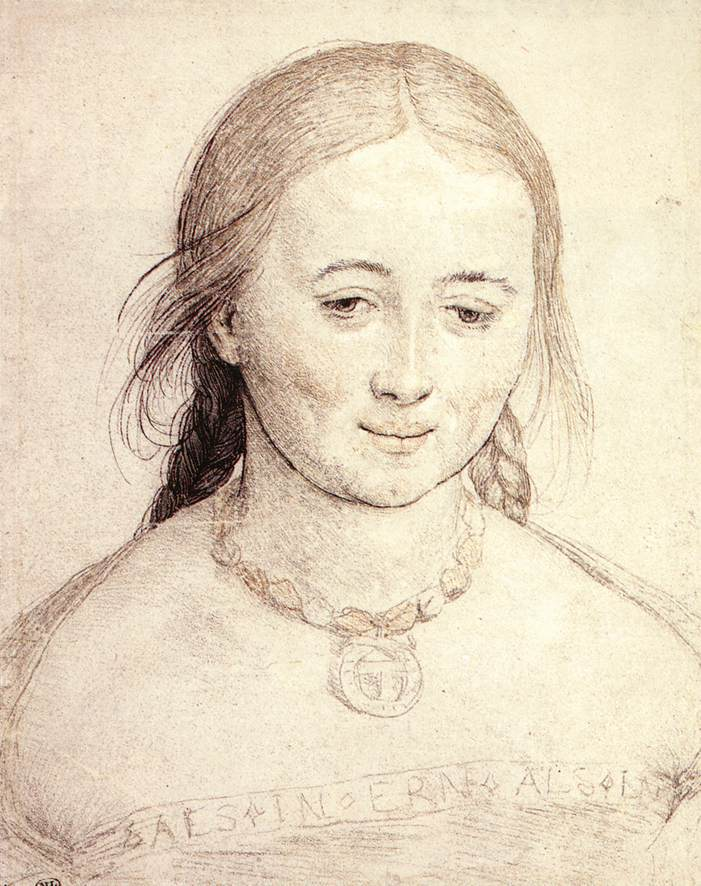
Portrait of a young woman, by Hans Holbein

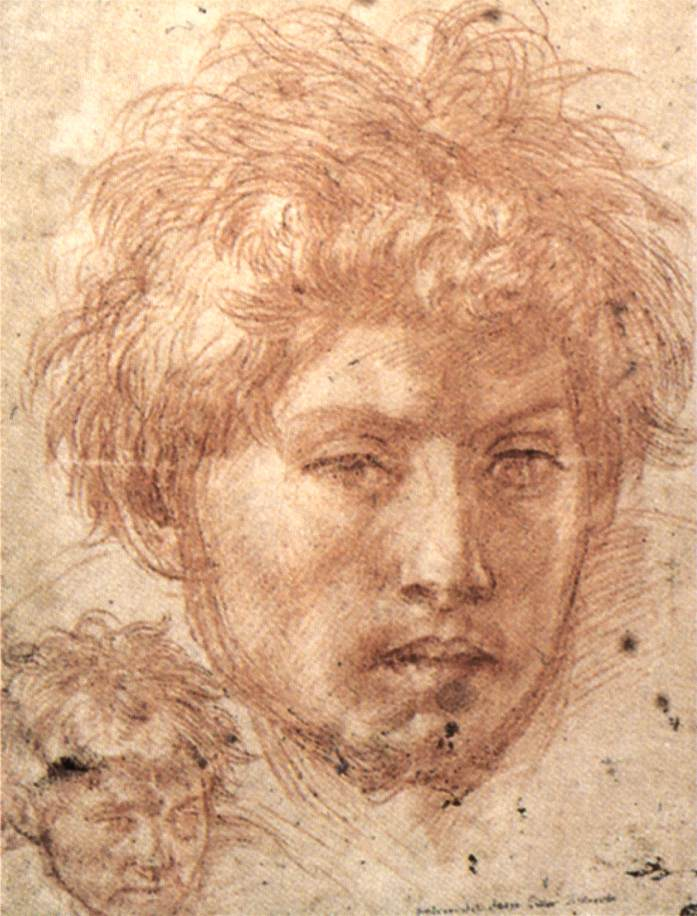
Head of a man, by Andrea del Sarto

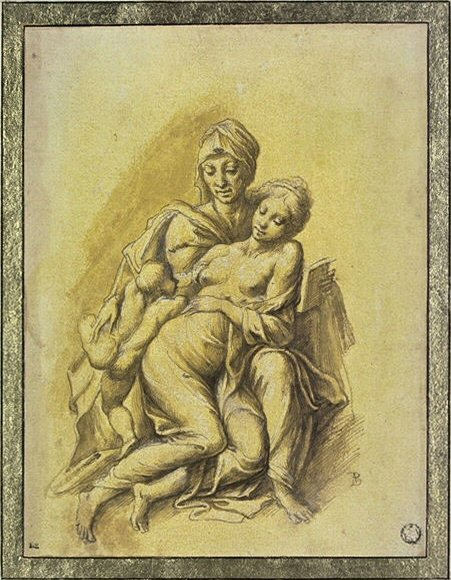
Virgin and Child, by Biagio Pupini

=== Gallery of the Five Continents ===
The Gallery of the Five Continents presents 130 works of art from across the five continents Africa, the Americas, Asia, Europe, and Oceania in a unified museographical framework. The gallery opened on 3 December 2025, replacing the former Pavillon des Sessions and represents a newly designed institutional effort to present non-European artistic traditions alongside Western art in a global narrative of world cultures. A central aim of the gallery's design is to foster a dialogue between diverse artistic traditions and to present a more inclusive and interconnected story of human creativity.

== Management, administration, partnerships ==
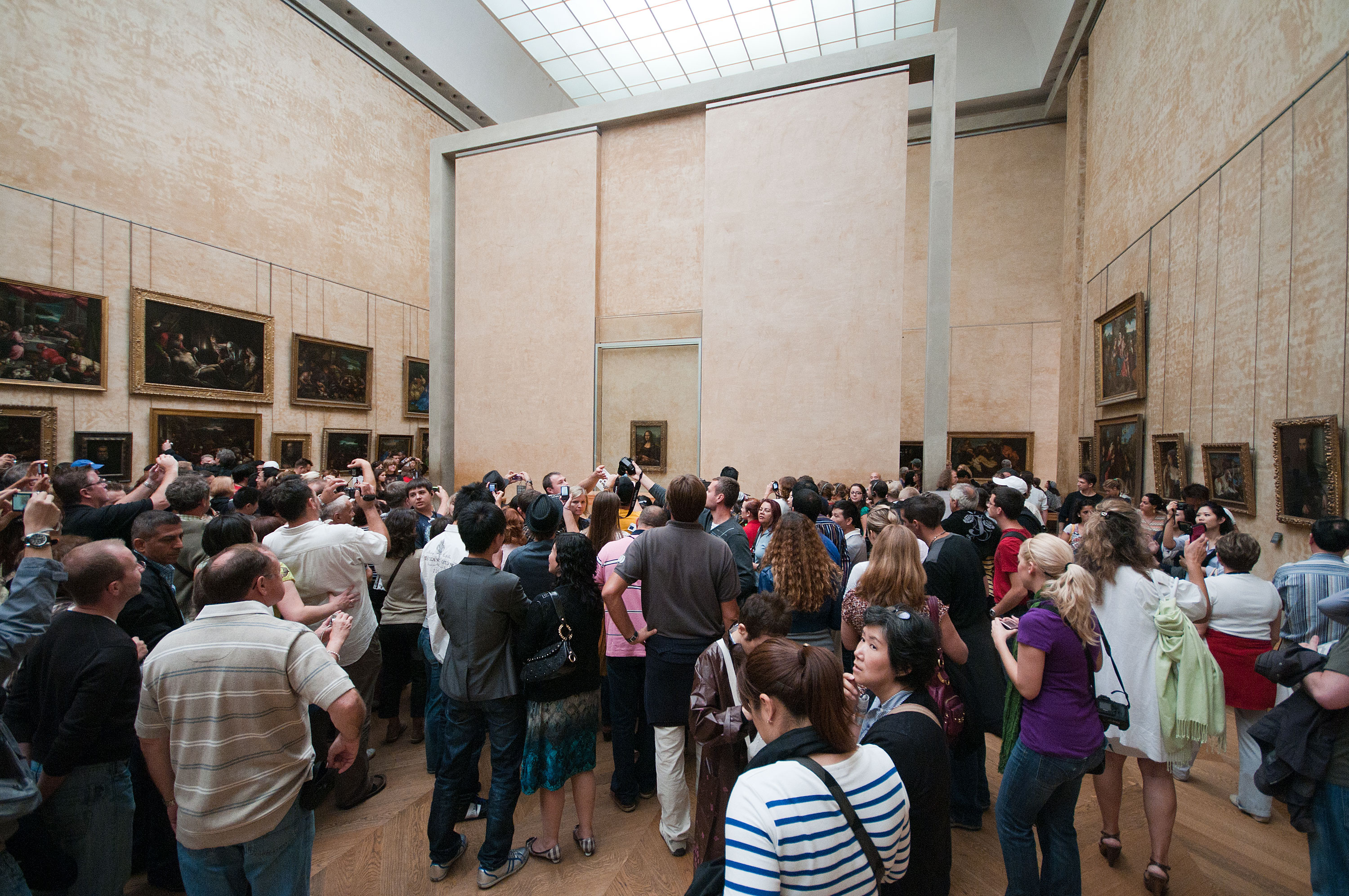
Leonardo da Vinci's Mona Lisa is the Louvre's most popular attraction.

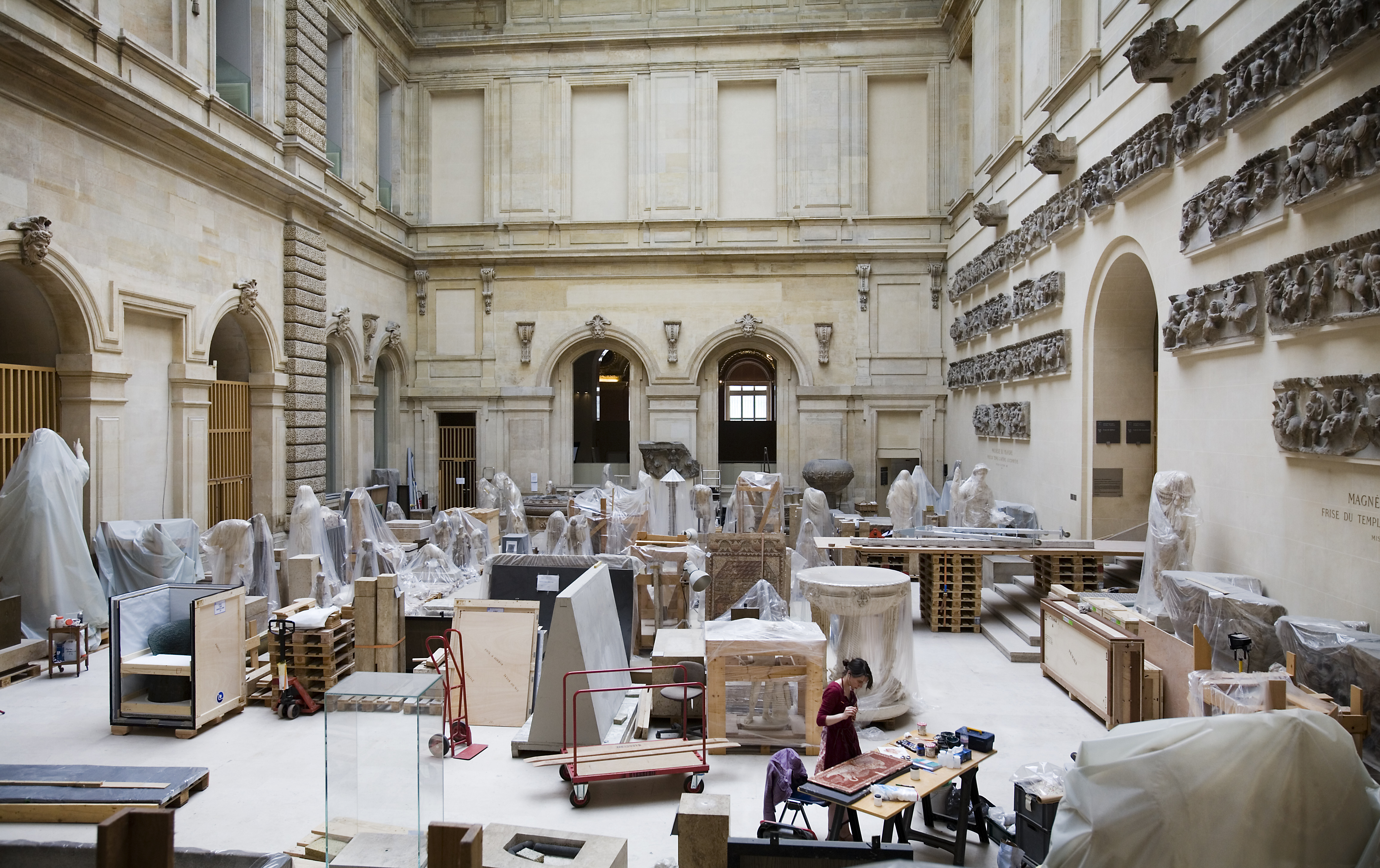
Restoration workshops in the Louvre

The Louvre is owned by the French government. Since the 1990s, its management and governance have been made more independent. Since 2003, the museum has been required to generate funds for projects. By 2006, government funds had dipped from 75 percent of the total budget to 62 percent. Every year, the Louvre now raises as much as it gets from the state, about €122 million. The government pays for operating costs (salaries, safety, and maintenance), while the rest – new wings, refurbishments, acquisitions – is up to the museum to finance. A further €3 million to €5 million a year is raised by the Louvre from exhibitions that it curates for other museums, while the host museum keeps the ticket money. As the Louvre became a point of interest in the book The Da Vinci Code and the 2006 film based on the book, the museum earned $2.5 million by allowing filming in its galleries. In 2008, the French government provided $180 million of the Louvre's yearly $350 million budget; the remainder came from private contributions and ticket sales.

The Louvre employs a staff of 2,000 led by Director Jean-Luc Martinez, who reports to the French Ministry of Culture and Communications. Martinez replaced Henri Loyrette in April 2013. Under Loyrette, who replaced Pierre Rosenberg in 2001, the Louvre has undergone policy changes that allow it to lend and borrow more works than before. In 2006, it loaned 1,300 works, which enabled it to borrow more foreign works. From 2006 to 2009, the Louvre lent artwork to the High Museum of Art in Atlanta, Georgia, and received a $6.9 million payment to be used for renovations.

In 2009, Minister of culture Frédéric Mitterrand approved a plan that would have created a storage facility 30 km (19 mi) northwest of Paris to hold objects from the Louvre and two other national museums in Paris's flood zone, the Musée du Quai Branly and the Musée d'Orsay; the plan was later scrapped. In 2013, his successor Aurélie Filippetti announced that the Louvre would move more than 250,000 works of art held in a 20,000 square metres (220,000 sq ft) basement storage area in Liévin; the cost of the project, estimated at €60 million, will be split between the region (49%) and the Louvre (51%). The Louvre will be the sole owner and manager of the store. In July 2015, a team led by British firm Rogers Stirk Harbour + Partners was selected to design the complex, which will have light-filled work spaces under one vast, green roof.

In 2012, the Louvre and the Fine Arts Museums of San Francisco announced a five-year collaboration on exhibitions, publications, art conservation and educational programming. The €98.5 million expansion of the Islamic Art galleries in 2012 received state funding of €31 million, as well as €17 million from the Alwaleed Bin Talal Foundation founded by the eponymous Saudi prince. The Republic of Azerbaijan, the Emir of Kuwait, the Sultan of Oman and King Mohammed VI of Morocco donated in total €26 million. In addition, the opening of the Louvre Abu Dhabi is supposed to provide €400 million over the course of 30 years for its use of the museum's brand. Loyrette has tried to improve weak parts of the collection through income generated from loans of art and by guaranteeing that "20% of admissions receipts will be taken annually for acquisitions". He has more administrative independence for the museum and achieved 90 percent of galleries to be open daily, as opposed to 80 percent previously. He oversaw the creation of extended hours and free admission on Friday nights and an increase in the acquisition budget to $36 million from $4.5 million.

In March 2018, an exhibition of dozens of artworks and relics belonging to France's Louvre Museum was opened to visitors in Tehran, as a result of an agreement between Iranian and French presidents in 2016. In the Louvre, two departments were allocated to the antiquities of the Iranian civilisation, and the managers of the two departments visited Tehran. Relics belonging to Ancient Egypt, Rome and Mesopotamia as well as French royal items were showcased at the Tehran exhibition.

Iran's National Museum building was designed and constructed by French architect André Godard. Following its time in Tehran, the exhibition is set to be held in the Khorasan Grand Museum in Mashhad, northeastern Iran in June 2018.

On the 500th anniversary of Leonardo da Vinci's death, the Louvre held the largest ever single exhibit of his work, from 24 October 2019 to 24 February 2020. The event included over a hundred items: paintings, drawings and notebooks. A full 11 of the fewer than 20 paintings that Da Vinci completed in his lifetime were displayed. Five of them are owned by the Louvre, but the Mona Lisa was not included because it is in such great demand among visitors to the Louvre museum; the work remained on display in its gallery. Salvator Mundi was also not included since the Saudi owner did not agree to move the work from its hiding place. Vitruvian Man, however, was on display, after a successful legal battle with its owner, the Galleria dell'Accademia in Venice.

In 2021, a Renaissance era ceremonial helmet and breastplate stolen from the museum in 1983 were recovered. The museum noted that the 1983 theft had "deeply troubled all the staff at the time." There are few publicly accessible details on the theft itself.

Former director of the Louvre is Laurence des Cars, who was selected by French president Emmanuel Macron in 2021. She was the first woman to hold this position. During the COVID-19 pandemic, the Louvre has launched a digital platform where most of its works, including those that are not on display, can be seen. The database includes more than 482,000 illustrated records, representing 75% of the Louvre's collections. The museum was visited by over 7.6 million visitors in 2022, up 170 percent from 2021, but still below the 10.8 million visitors in 2018 before the COVID-19 pandemic. On 24 February 2026, Laurence des Cars handed in her resignation to President Emmanuel Macron, which was accepted following the heist.

Christophe Leribault was then appointed president of the iconic museum by the Council of Ministers on 25 February 2026.

In 2023, the Louvre Museum in Paris implemented a significant change in its pricing policy, marking the first price increase since 2017. The decision to raise ticket prices by 30% is part of a broader strategy aimed at supporting free entry during the Olympics and effectively managing the anticipated crowd. Director Laurence des Cars has introduced measures to regulate attendance, including capping daily visitors at 30,000 and planning a new entrance to alleviate congestion. These efforts are geared towards ensuring a top-notch experience for art enthusiasts during the Olympic Games, as the museum expects to host approximately 8.7 million visitors this year, with a remarkable 80% seeking to view the Mona Lisa. As of January 14, 2026, the museum implemented a two-tier pricing system, marking a 45% increase for non-European Economic Area (EEA) visitors with tickets now priced at €32, while maintaining the €22 rate for EEA residents. This policy change was introduced to help fund essential security upgrades and infrastructure renovations following the major security breach in late 2025.

In 2026, nine people were arrested as part of an investigation into the fraudulent reusage of admission tickets into the Louvre that resulted in at least 10 million euros ($11.8 million) in losses to the museum over the previous 10 years.

== Archaeological research ==
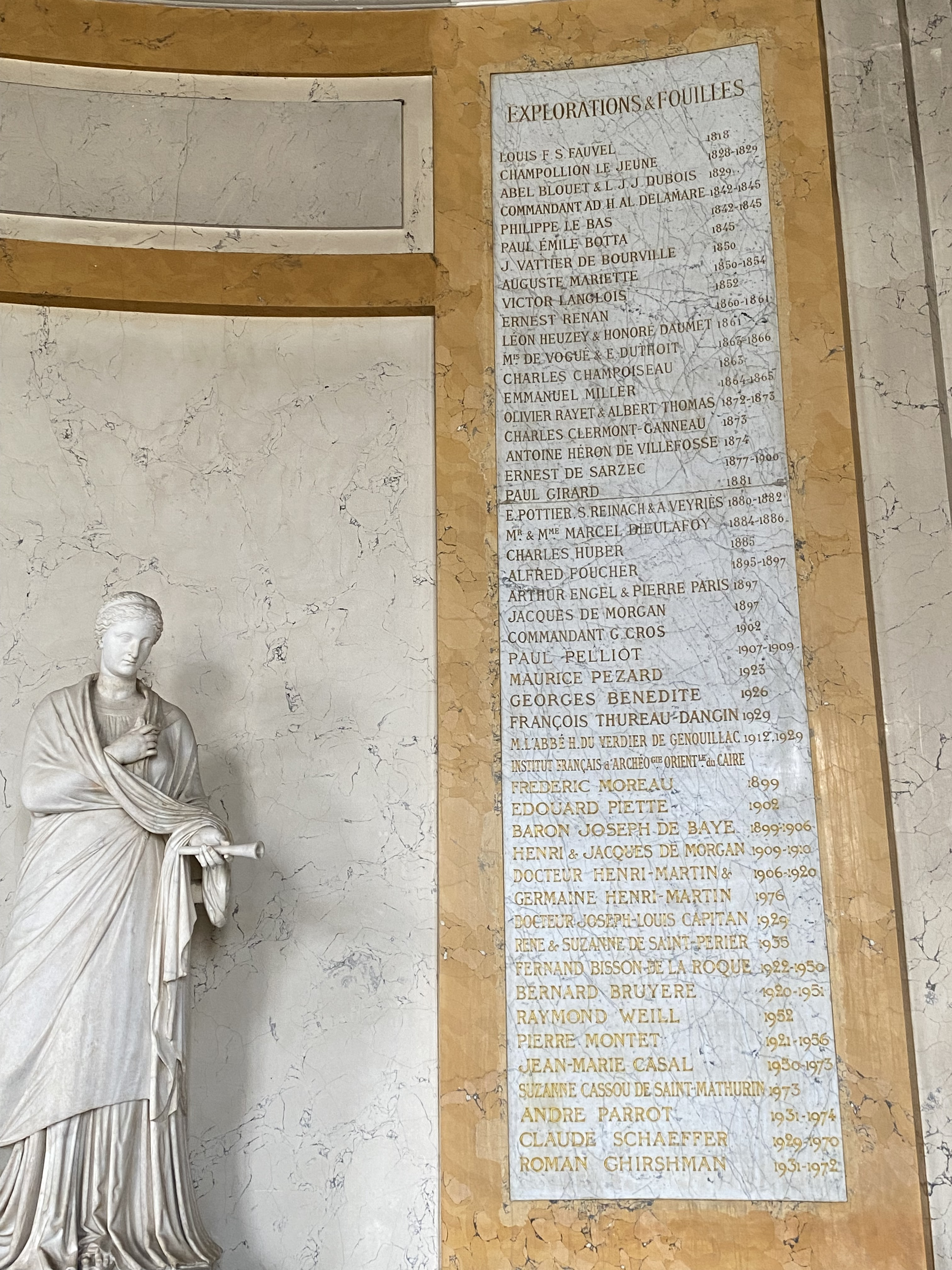
List of excavations that benefited the Louvre (Rotonde d'Apollon)

The Louvre's ancient art collections are to a significant extent the product of excavations, some of which the museum sponsored under various legal regimes over time, often as a companion to France's diplomacy and colonial enterprises. In the Rotonde d'Apollon, a carved marble panel lists a number of such campaigns, led by:

- Louis-François-Sébastien Fauvel in Greece (1818)
- Jean-François Champollion in Egypt (1828–1829)
- Guillaume-Abel Blouet and Léon-Jean-Joseph Dubois with the Morea expedition in Greece (1829)
- Adolphe Delamare in Algeria (1842–1845)
- Paul-Émile Botta in the Nineveh Plains (1845)
- Joseph Vattier de Bourville in Cyrenaica (1850)
- Auguste Mariette in Egypt (1850–1854)
- Victor Langlois in Cilicia (1852)
- Ernest Renan with the Mission de Phénicie following the 1860 civil conflict in Mount Lebanon and Damascus (1860–1861)
- Léon Heuzey and Honoré Daumet in Macedonia (1861)
- Eugène-Melchior de Vogüé and Edmond Duthoit in Cyprus (1863–1866)
- Charles Champoiseau in Samothrace (1863)
- Emmanuel Miller in Thessaloniki and Thasos (1864–1865)
- Olivier Rayet and Albert-Félix-Théophile Thomas in Ionia (1872–1873)
- Charles Simon Clermont-Ganneau in Palestine (1873)
- Antoine Héron de Villefosse in Algeria and Tunisia (1874)
- Ernest de Sarzec in Tello / ancient Girsu, Mesopotamia (1877–1900)
- Paul Girard in Greece (1881)
- Edmond Pottier, Salomon Reinach and Alphonse Veyries in Myrina (Aeolis) (1872–1873)
- Marcel-Auguste Dieulafoy and Jane Dieulafoy in Susa, Persia (1884–1886)
- Charles Huber in Tayma, Arabia (1885)
- Alfred Charles Auguste Foucher in India and present-day Pakistan (1895–1897)
- Arthur Engel and Pierre Paris in Spain (1897)
- Jacques de Morgan in Susa (1897)
- Gaston Cros in Tello / ancient Girsu (1902)
- Paul Pelliot in Chinese Turkestan (1907–1909)
- Maurice Pézard in Northern Palestine (1923)
- Georges Aaron Bénédite in Egypt (1926)
- François Thureau-Dangin in Northern Syria (1929)
- Henri de Genouillac in Mesopotamia (1912, 1929)
- the Institut Français d'Archéologie Orientale in Cairo, created in 1880

The rest of the plaque combines donors of archaeological items, many of whom were archaeologists themselves, and other archaeologists whose excavations contributed to the Louvre's collections:

- Frédéric Moreau in France (1899)
- Édouard Piette in France (1902)
- Joseph de Baye in France (1899–1906)
- Henri and Jacques de Morgan in Susa (1909–1910)
- Léon Henri-Martin (1906–1920) and his daughter Germaine in France (1976)
- Louis Capitan in France (1929)
- René de Saint-Périer and his wife Suzanne in France (1935)
- Fernand Bisson de la Roque in Egypt (1922–1950)
- Bernard Bruyère in Egypt (1920–1951)
- Raymond Weill in Egypt (1952)
- Pierre Montet in Egypt (1921–1956)
- Jean Marie Casal in the Indus Valley and Afghanistan (1950–1973)
- Suzanne de Saint-Mathurin in France (1973)
- André Parrot in Mari, Syria (1931–1974)
- Claude Frédéric-Armand Schaeffer in Ugarit, Syria (1929–1970)
- Roman Ghirshman in Iraq and Iran (1931–1972)

== Satellites and offshoots ==
Several museums in and outside France have been or are placed under the Louvre's administrative authority or linked to it through exclusive partnerships, while not being located in the Louvre Palace. Since 2019, the Louvre has also maintained a large art storage and research facility in the Northern French town of Liévin, the Centre de conservation du Louvre, which is not open to the public.

=== Musée de Cluny (1926–1977) ===
In February 1926, the Musée de Cluny, whose creation dates back to the 19th century, was brought under the aegis of the Louvre's department of decorative arts (Objets d'Art). That affiliation was terminated in 1977.

=== Musée du Jeu de Paume (1947–1986) ===
The Jeu de Paume building in the Tuileries Garden, initially intended as a sports venue, was repurposed from 1909 as an art gallery. In 1947, it became the exhibition space for the Louvre's collections of late 19th and early 20th paintings, most prominently Impressionism, as the Louvre Palace was lacking space to display them, and was consequently brought under direct management by the Louvre's Département des Peintures. In 1986, these collections were transferred to the newly created Musée d'Orsay.

=== Musée du Petit Palais, Avignon (since 1976) ===
The Musée du Petit Palais opened in 1976 in the former urban mansion of the archbishops of Avignon, close to the Papal Palace in Avignon. An initiative led by Avignon Mayor Henri Duffaut and Louvre President-Director Michel Laclotte, part of its permanent collection is made of artworks from the Collection Campana deposited by the Louvre. On 2024-04-02, a new agreement between the City of Avignon and the Louvre allowed its rebranding as Musée du Petit Palais – Louvre en Avignon.

=== Gypsothèque du Louvre (since 2001) ===
The gypsothèque (plaster cast gallery) of the Louvre is a collection of plaster casts that was formed in 1970 by the reunion of the corresponding inventories of the Louvre, the Beaux-Arts de Paris and the Art and Archaeology Institute of the Sorbonne University, the latter two following depredations during the May 68 student unrest. Initially called the Musée des Monuments Antiques from 1970 to 1978, the project was subsequently left unfinished and only came to fruition after being brought under the Louvre's management by ministerial decision in 2001. It is located in the Petite Écurie, a dependency of Versailles Palace, and has been open to the public since 2012.

=== Musée Delacroix (since 2004) ===
The small museum located in Eugène Delacroix's former workshop in central Paris, created in the 1930s, has been placed under management by the Louvre since 2004.

=== Louvre-Lens (since 2012) ===
The Louvre-Lens follows a May 2003 initiative by then culture minister Jean-Jacques Aillagon to promote cultural projects outside of Paris that would make the riches of major Parisian institutions available to a broader French public, including a satellite (antenne) of the Louvre. After several rounds of competition, a former mining site in the town of Lens was selected for its location and announced by Prime Minister Jean-Pierre Raffarin on 2004-11-29. Japanese architects SANAA and landscape architect Catherine Mosbach were respectively selected in September 2005 to design the museum building and garden. Inaugurated by President François Hollande on 2012-12-04, the Louvre-Lens is run by the Hauts-de-France region under a contract (convention scientifique et culturelle) with the Louvre for art loans and brand use. Its main attraction is an exhibition of roughly 200 artworks from the Louvre on a rotating basis, presented chronologically in a single large room (the Galerie du Temps or "gallery of time") that transcends the geographical and object-type divisions along which the Parisian Louvre's displays are organised. The Louvre-Lens has been successful at attracting around 500,000 visitors per year until the COVID-19 pandemic.

=== Louvre Abu Dhabi (since 2017) ===
The Louvre Abu Dhabi is a separate entity from the Louvre, but the two entities have a multifaceted contractual relationship that allows the Emirati museum to use the Louvre name until 2037, and to exhibit artworks from the Louvre until 2027. It was inaugurated on 2017-11-08 and opened to the public three days later. A 30-year agreement, signed in early 2007 by French Culture Minister Renaud Donnedieu de Vabres and Sheikh Sultan bin Tahnoon Al Nahyan, establishes that Abu Dhabi shall pay €832,000,000 (US$1.3 billion) in exchange for the Louvre name use, managerial advice, art loans, and special exhibitions. The Louvre Abu Dhabi is located on Saadiyat Island and was designed by the French architect Jean Nouvel and engineering firm of Buro Happold. It occupies 24,000 square metres (260,000 sq ft) and is covered by an iconic metallic dome designed to cast rays of light mimicking sunlight passing through date palm fronds in an oasis. The French art loans, expected to total between 200 and 300 artworks during a 10-year period, come from multiple museums, including the Louvre, the Centre Georges Pompidou, the Musée d'Orsay, Versailles, the Guimet Museum, the Musée Rodin, and the Musée du quai Branly.

== Controversies ==
The Louvre is involved in controversies that surround cultural property seized under Napoleon I, as well as during World War II by the Nazis. In the early 2010s, workers' rights in the construction of Louvre Abu Dhabi were also a point of controversy for the museum.

=== Napoleonic looting ===
Napoleon's campaigns acquired Italian pieces by treaties, as war reparations, and Northern European pieces as spoils, as well as some antiquities excavated in Egypt, though the vast majority of the latter were seized as war reparations by the British army and are now part of collections of the British Museum. On the other hand, the Dendera zodiac is, like the Rosetta Stone, claimed by Egypt even though it was acquired in 1821, before the Egyptian Anti-export legislation of 1835. The Louvre administration has thus argued in favour of retaining this item despite requests by Egypt for its return. The museum participates too in arbitration sessions held via UNESCO's Committee for Promoting the Return of Cultural Property to Its Countries of Origin. The museum consequently returned in 2009 five Egyptian fragments of frescoes (30 cm x 15 cm each) whose existence of the tomb of origin had only been brought to the authorities attention in 2008, eight to five years after their good-faith acquisition by the museum from two private collections and after the necessary respect of the procedure of déclassement from French public collections before the Commission scientifique nationale des collections des musées de France.

=== Nazi looting ===
During Nazi occupation, thousands of artworks were stolen. But after the war, 61,233 articles of more than 150,000 seized artworks returned to France and were assigned to the Office des Biens Privés. In 1949, it entrusted 2,130 unclaimed pieces (including 1,001 paintings) to the Direction des Musées de France in order to keep them under appropriate conditions of conservation until their restitution and meanwhile classified them as MNRs (Musées Nationaux Recuperation or, in English, the National Museums of Recovered Artwork). Some 10% to 35% of the pieces are believed to come from Jewish spoliations and until the identification of their rightful owners, which declined at the end of the 1960s, they are registered indefinitely on separate inventories from the museum's collections.

They were exhibited in 1946 and shown all together to the public during four years (1950–1954) in order to allow rightful claimants to identify their properties, then stored or displayed, according to their interest, in several French museums including the Louvre. From 1951 to 1965, about 37 pieces were restituted. Since November 1996, the partly illustrated catalogue of 1947–1949 has been accessible online and completed. In 1997, Prime Minister Alain Juppé initiated the Mattéoli Commission, headed by Jean Mattéoli, to investigate the matter and according to the government, the Louvre is in charge of 678 pieces of artwork still unclaimed by their rightful owners. During the late 1990s, the comparison of the American war archives, which had not been done before, with the French and German ones as well as two court cases which finally settled some of the heirs' rights (Gentili di Giuseppe and Rosenberg families) allowed more accurate investigations. Since 1996, the restitutions, according sometimes to less formal criteria, concerned 47 more pieces (26 paintings, with 6 from the Louvre including a then displayed Tiepolo), until the last claims of French owners and their heirs ended again in 2006.

According to Serge Klarsfeld, since the now complete and constant publicity which the artworks got in 1996, the majority of the French Jewish community is nevertheless in favour of the return to the normal French civil rule of prescription acquisitive of any unclaimed good after another long period of time and consequently to their ultimate integration into the common French heritage instead of their transfer to foreign institutions like during World War II.

=== Construction of Louvre Abu Dhabi ===
In 2011, over 130 international artists urged a boycott of the new Guggenheim museum as well as Louvre Abu Dhabi, citing reports, since 2009, of abuses of foreign construction workers on Saadiyat Island, including the arbitrary withholding of wages, unsafe working conditions, and failure of companies to pay or reimburse the steep recruitment fees being charged to labourers. According to Architectural Record, Abu Dhabi has comprehensive labour laws to protect the workers, but they are not conscientiously implemented or enforced. In 2010, the Guggenheim Foundation placed on its website a joint statement with Abu Dhabi's Tourism Development and Investment Company (TDIC) recognising the following workers' rights issues, among others: health and safety of the workers; their access to their passports and other documents that the employers have been retaining to guaranty that they stay on the job; using a general contractor that agrees to obey the labour laws; maintaining an independent site monitor; and ending the system that has been generally used in the Persian Gulf region of requiring workers to reimburse recruitment fees.

In 2013, The Observer reported that conditions for the workers at the Louvre and New York University construction sites on Saadiyat amounted to "modern-day slavery". In 2014, the Guggenheim's Director, Richard Armstrong, said that he believed that living conditions for the workers at the Louvre project were now good and that "many fewer" of them were having their passports confiscated. He stated that the main issue then remaining was the recruitment fees charged to workers by agents who recruit them. Later in 2014, the Guggenheim's architect, Gehry, commented that working with the Abu Dhabi officials to implement the law to improve the labour conditions at the museum's site is "a moral responsibility." He encouraged the TDIC to build additional worker housing and proposed that the contractor cover the cost of the recruitment fees. In 2012, TDIC engaged PricewaterhouseCoopers as an independent monitor required to issue reports every quarter. Labour lawyer Scott Horton told Architectural Record that he hoped the Guggenheim project will influence the treatment of workers on other Saadiyat sites and will "serve as a model for doing things right."

== See also ==
- Hôtel du Louvre
- List of museums in Paris
- Musée de la mode et du textile
- List of tourist attractions in Paris
- List of largest art museums
- 2025 Louvre heist
