= Department of Egyptian Antiquities of the Louvre =

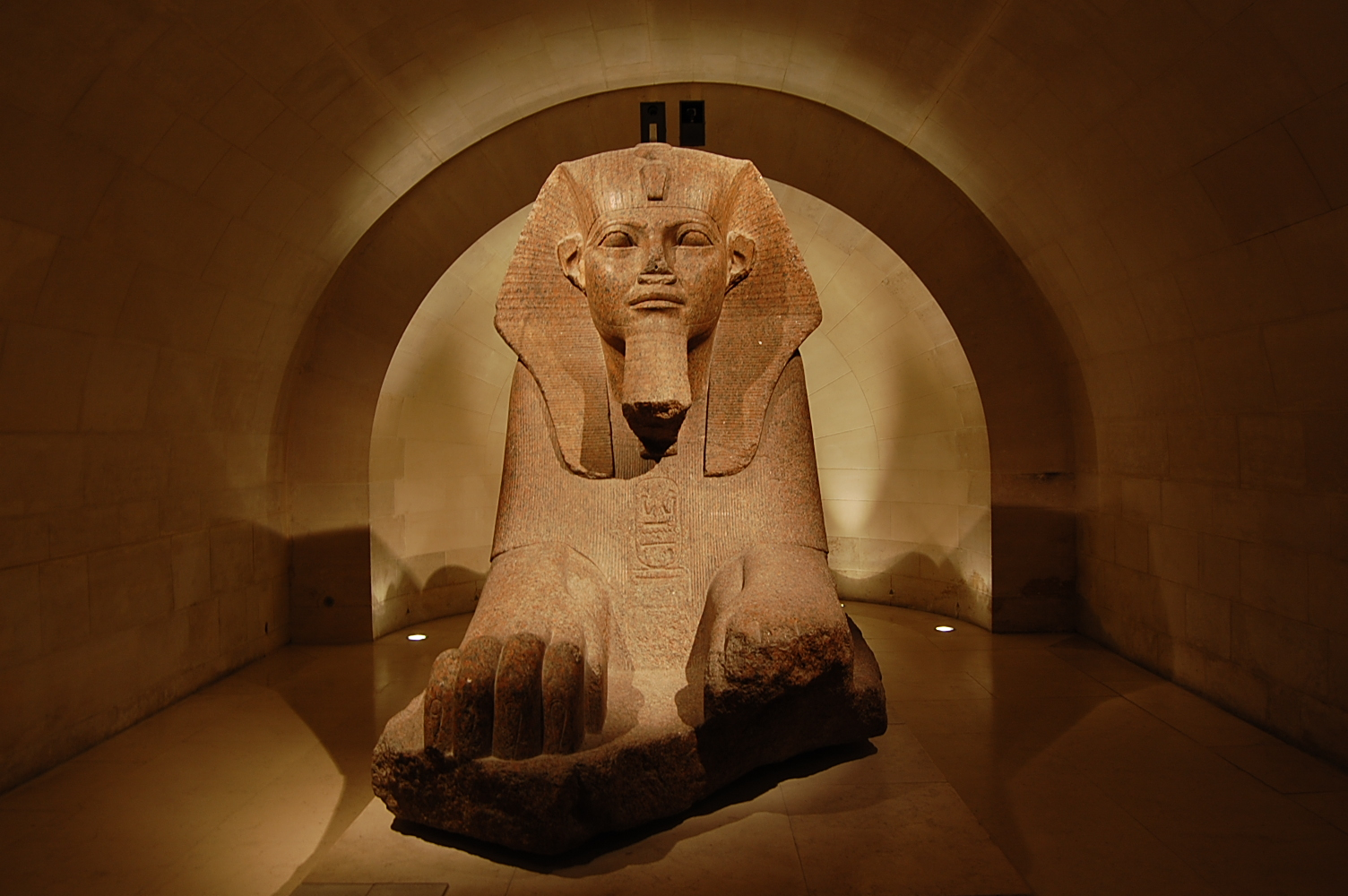
Crypt of the Sphinx, Room 1 of the department with the Great Sphinx of Tanis

The Department of Egyptian Antiquities of the Louvre (French: Département des Antiquités égyptiennes du Louvre) is a department of the Louvre that is responsible for artifacts from the Nile civilizations which date from 4,000 BC to the 4th century. The collection, comprising over 50,000 pieces, is among the world's largest, overviews Egyptian life spanning Ancient Egypt, the Middle Kingdom, the New Kingdom, Coptic art, and the Roman, Ptolemaic, and Byzantine periods.

== History ==
The department's origins lie in the royal collection, but it was augmented by Napoleon's 1798 expeditionary trip with Dominique Vivant, the future director of the Louvre. After Jean-François Champollion translated the Rosetta Stone, Charles X decreed that an Egyptian Antiquities department be created. Champollion advised the purchase of three collections, formed by Edmé-Antoine Durand, Henry Salt and Bernardino Drovetti; these additions added 7,000 works. Growth continued via acquisitions by Auguste Mariette, founder of the Egyptian Museum in Cairo. Mariette, after excavations at Memphis, sent back crates of archaeological finds including The Seated Scribe.

== Rooms of the Egyptian Antiquities Department ==
Guarded by the Large Sphinx (c. 2000 BC), the collection is housed in around 30 rooms. Holdings include art, papyrus scrolls, mummies, tools, clothing, jewelry, games, musical instruments, and weapons. Pieces from the ancient period include the Gebel el-Arak Knife from 3400 BC, The Seated Scribe, and the Head of King Djedefre. Middle Kingdom art, "known for its gold work and statues", moved from realism to idealization; this is exemplified by the schist statue of Amenemhatankh and the wooden Offering Bearer. The New Kingdom and Coptic Egyptian sections are deep, but the statue of the goddess Nephthys and the limestone depiction of the goddess Hathor demonstrate New Kingdom sentiment and wealth.

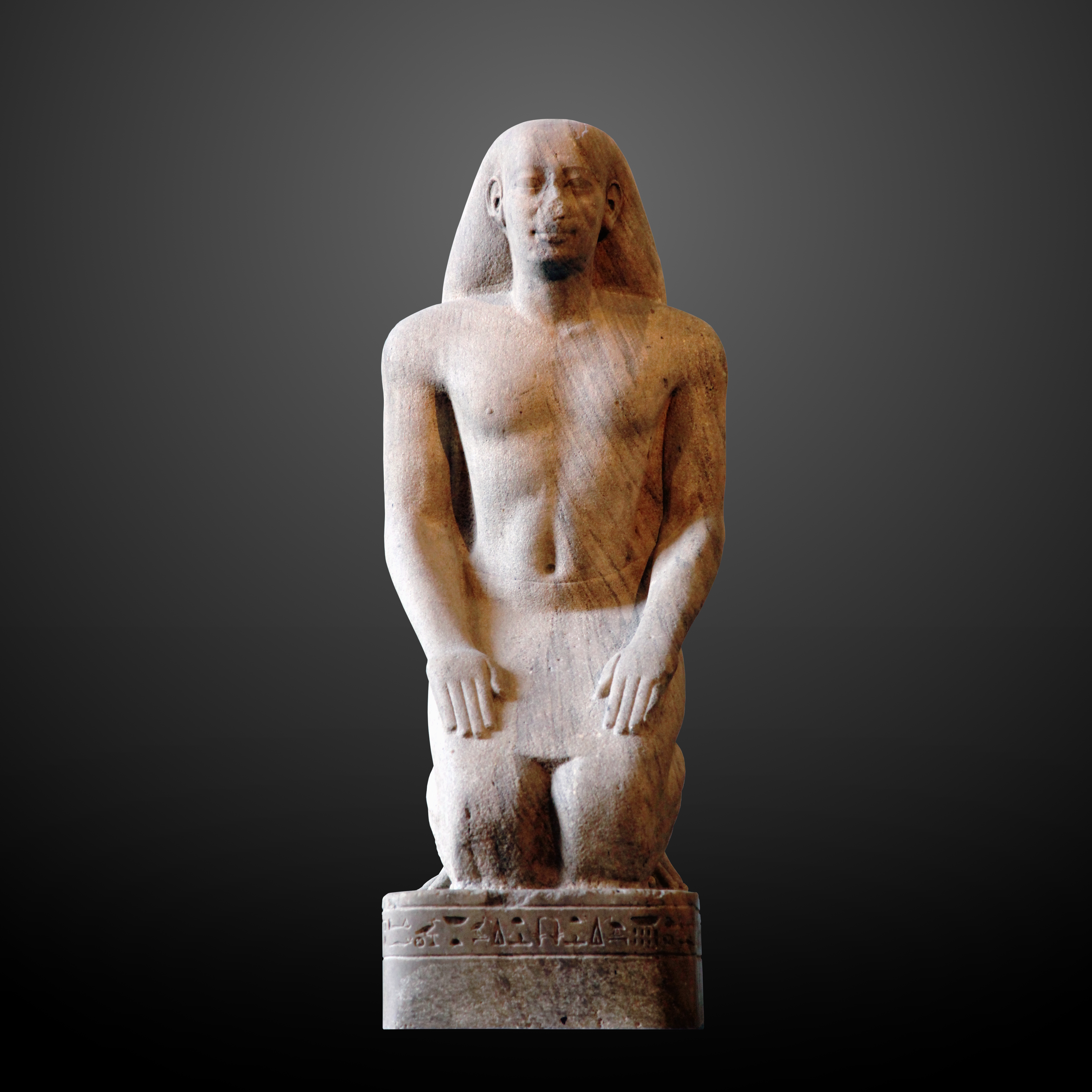
Statue of Nakhthorheb, Room 2

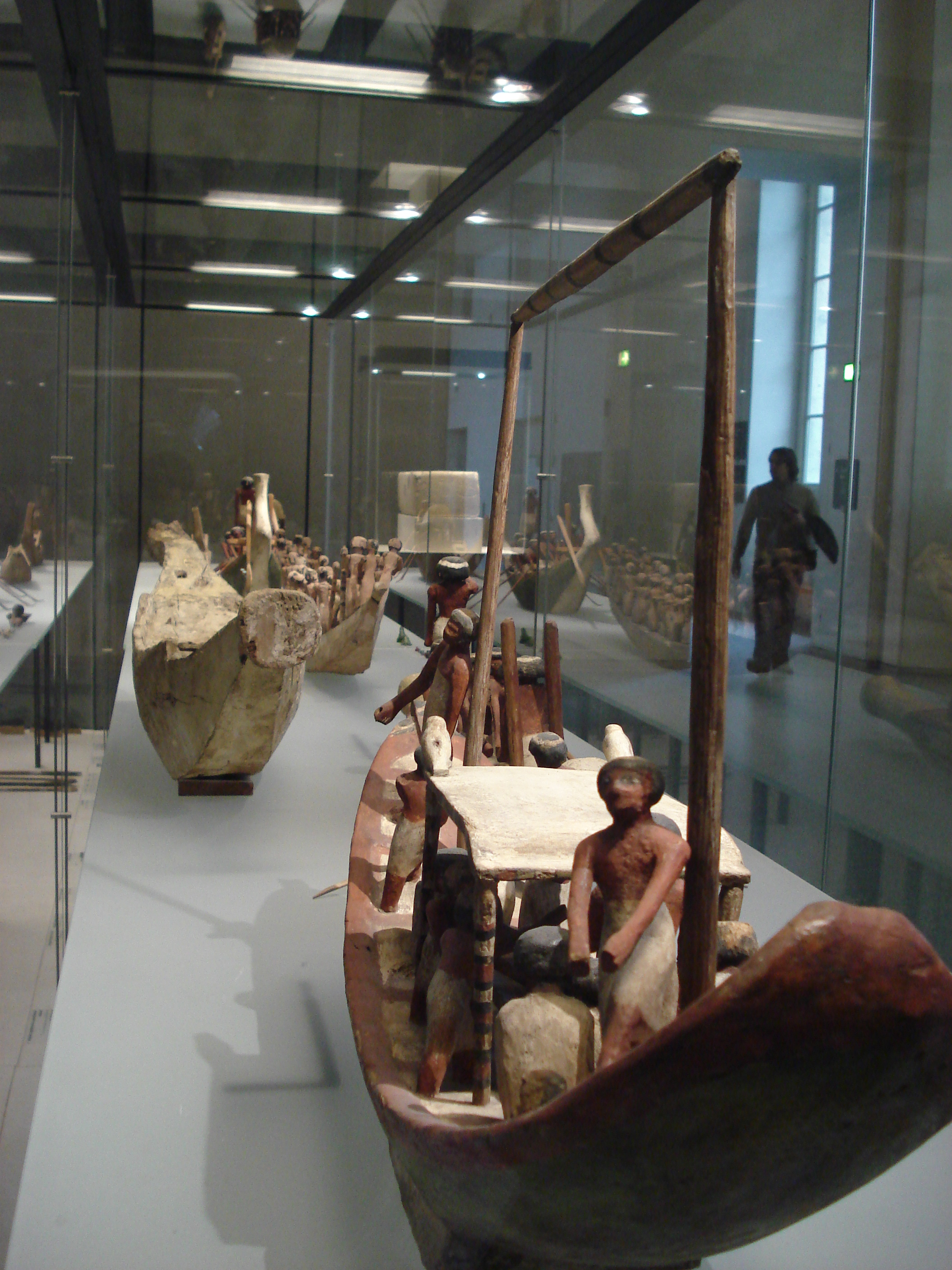
Ship model, Room 3

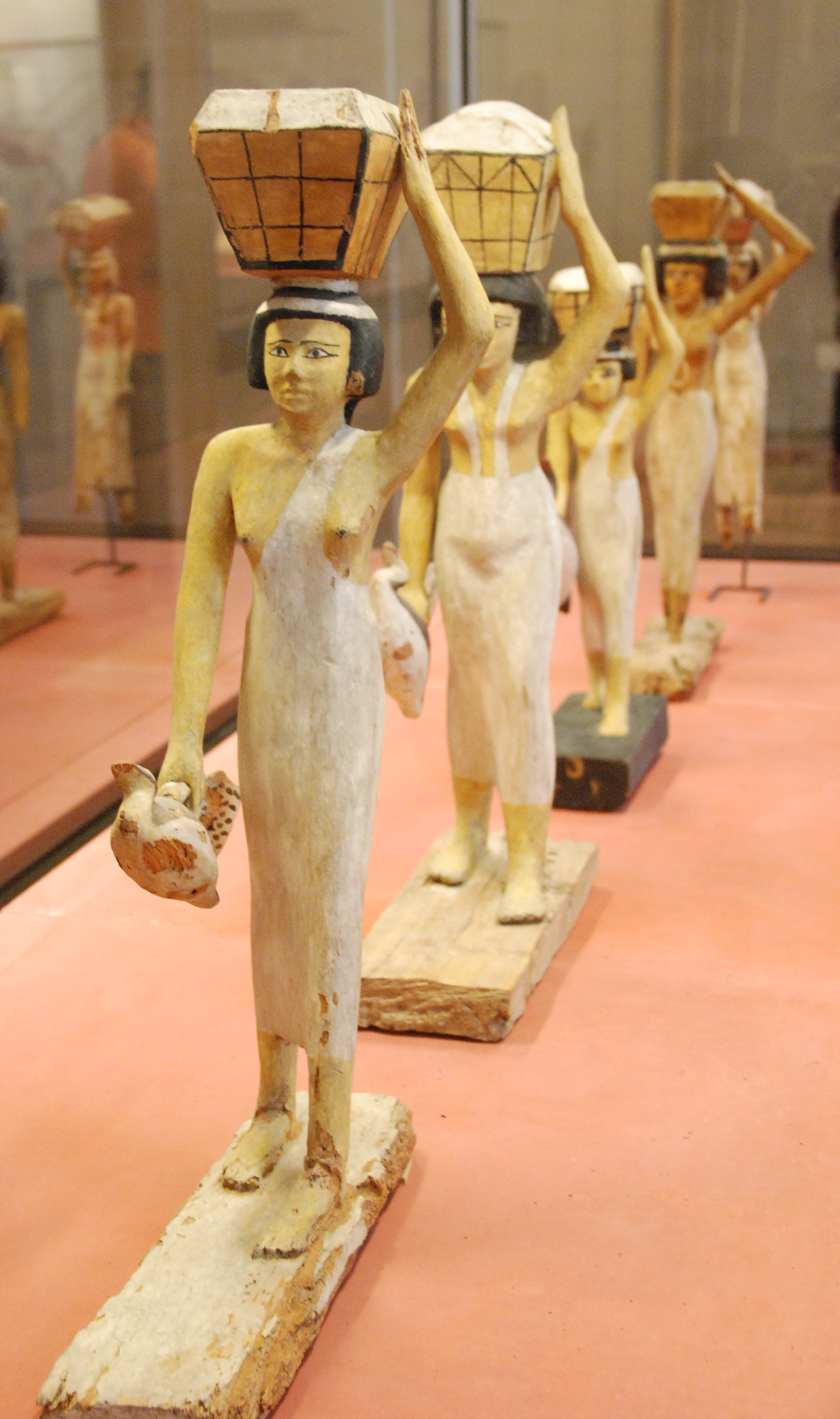
Statuettes of offering bearers, 12th dynasty, Room 4

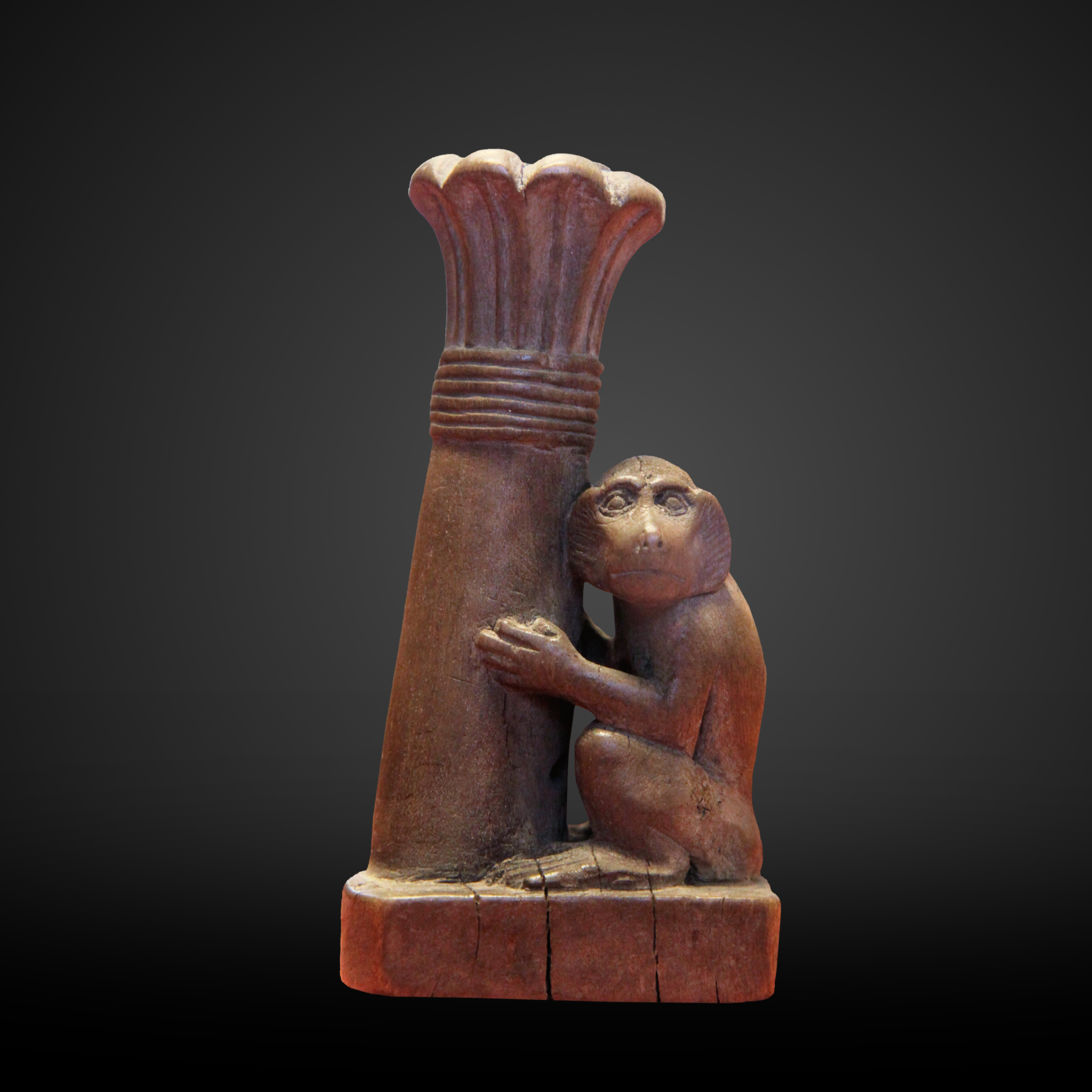
Kohl box monkey with palm tree, Room 5

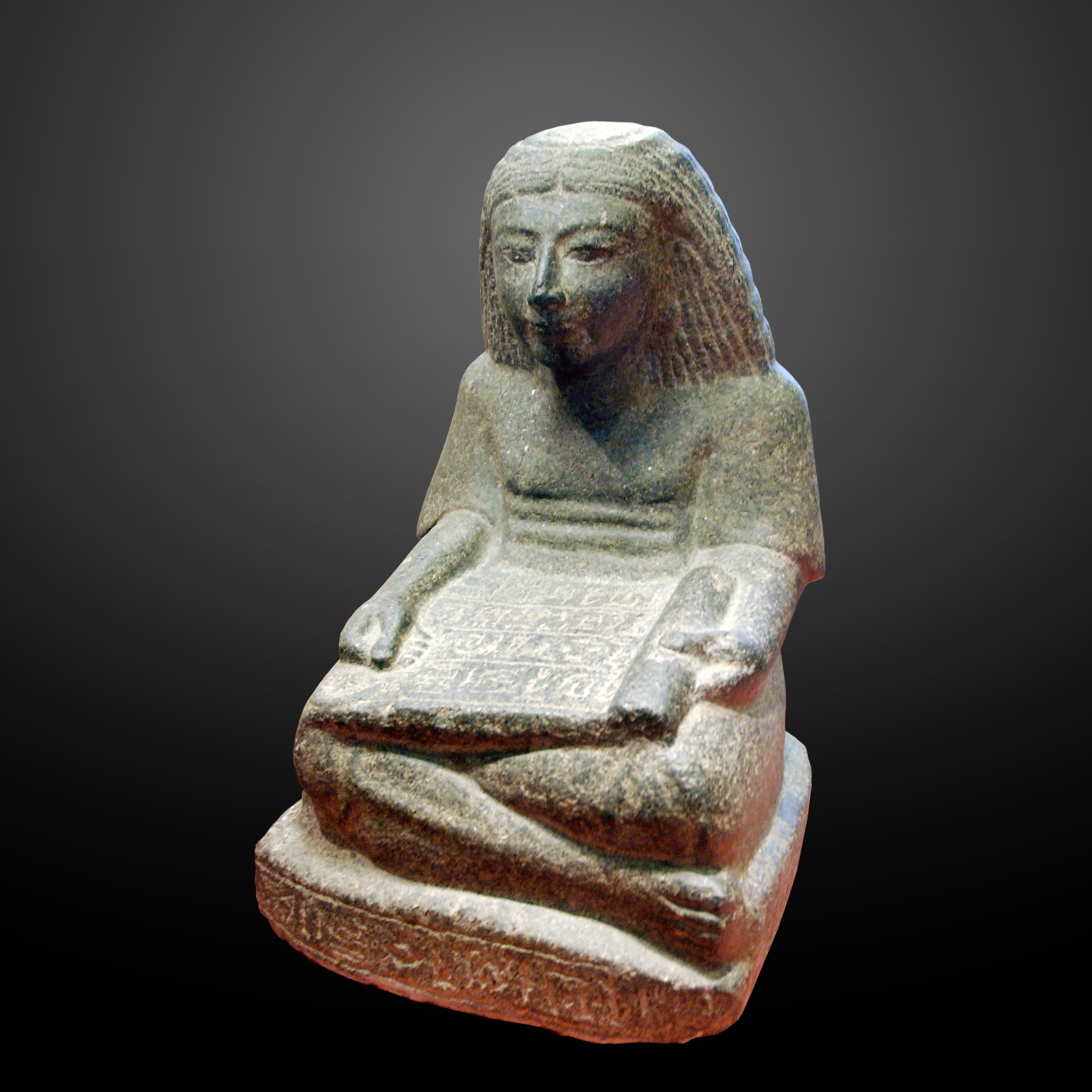
Seated scribe with papyrus scroll, Room 6

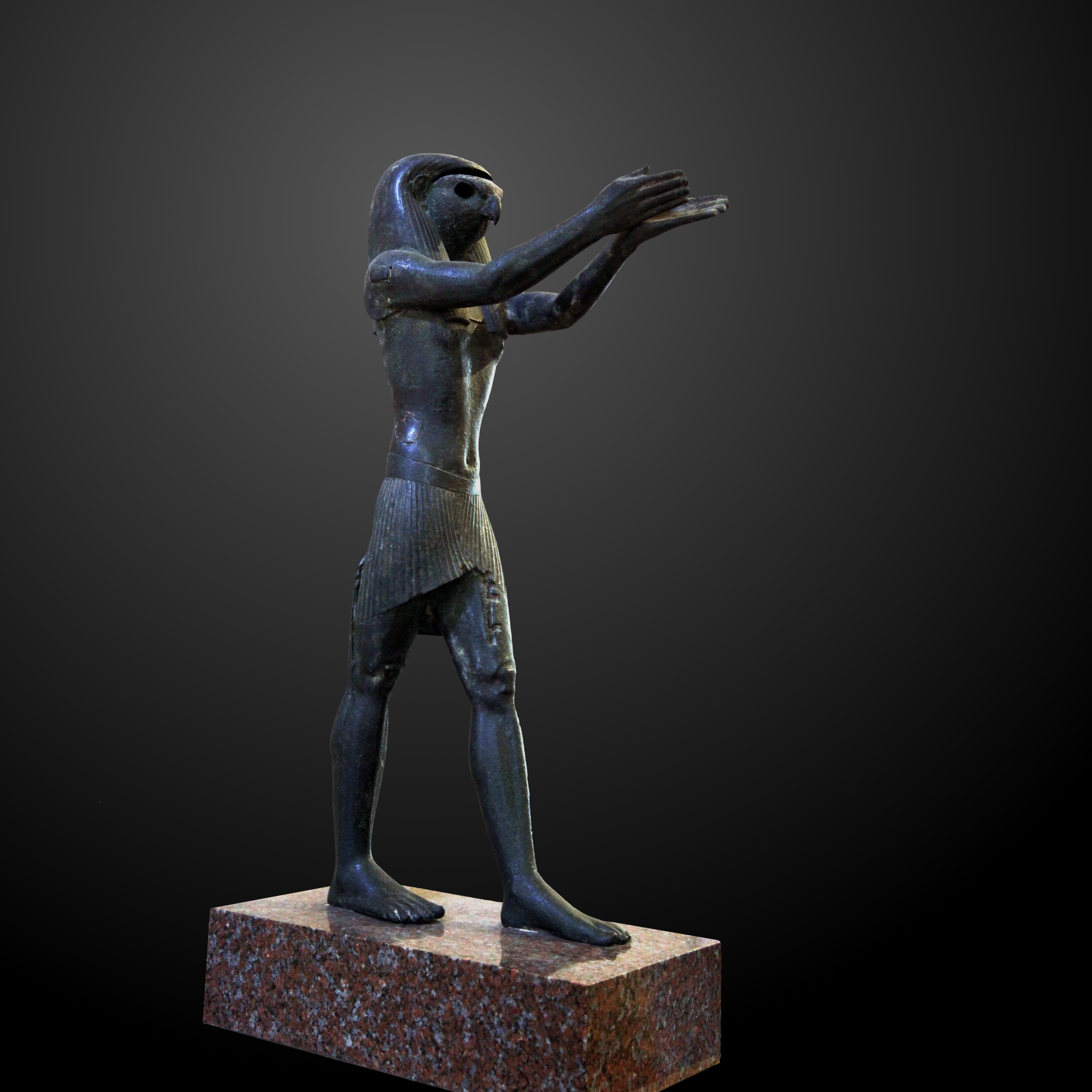
Statue of Horus, Room 7

Chair and table, Room 8

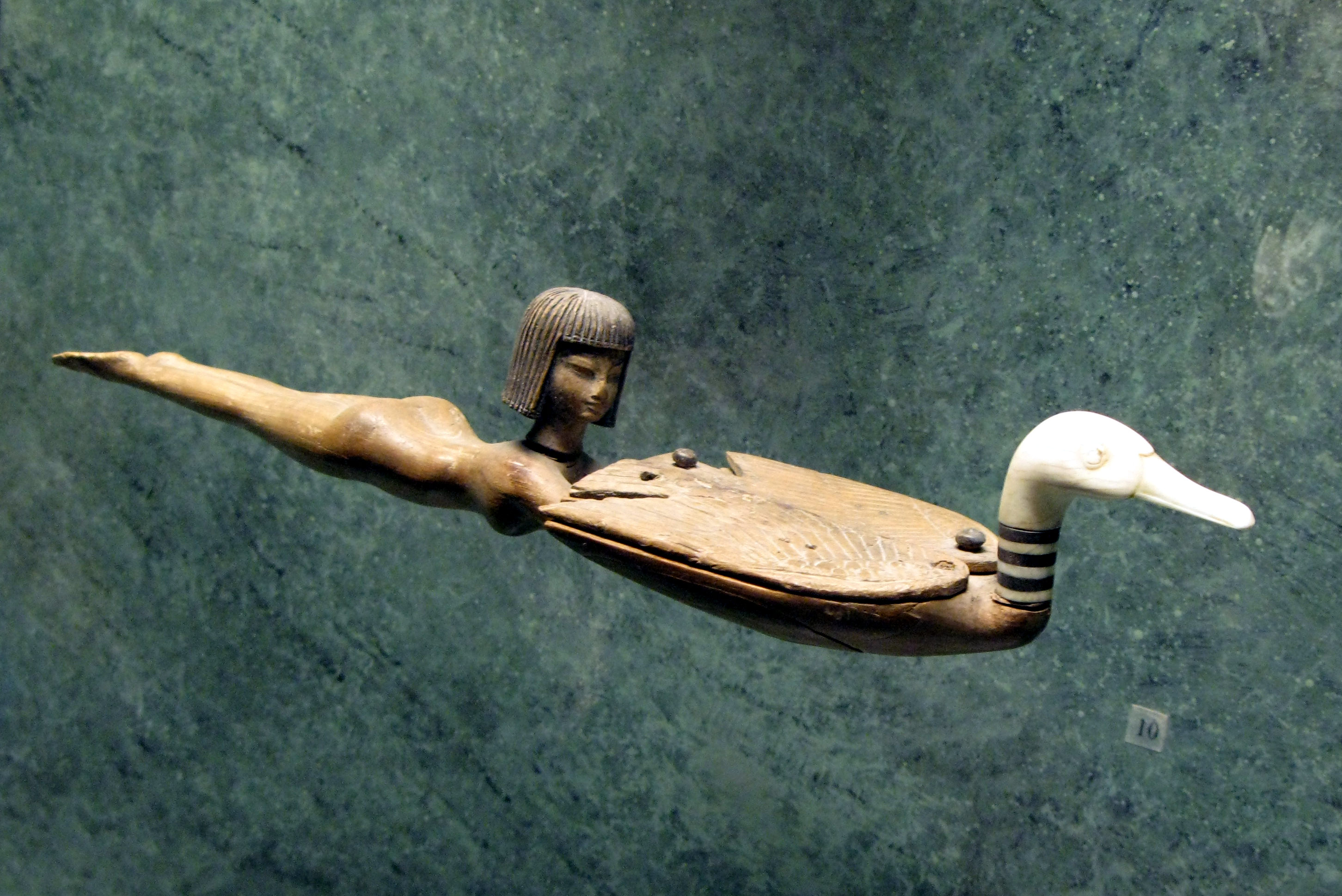
Cosmetics spoon, Room 9

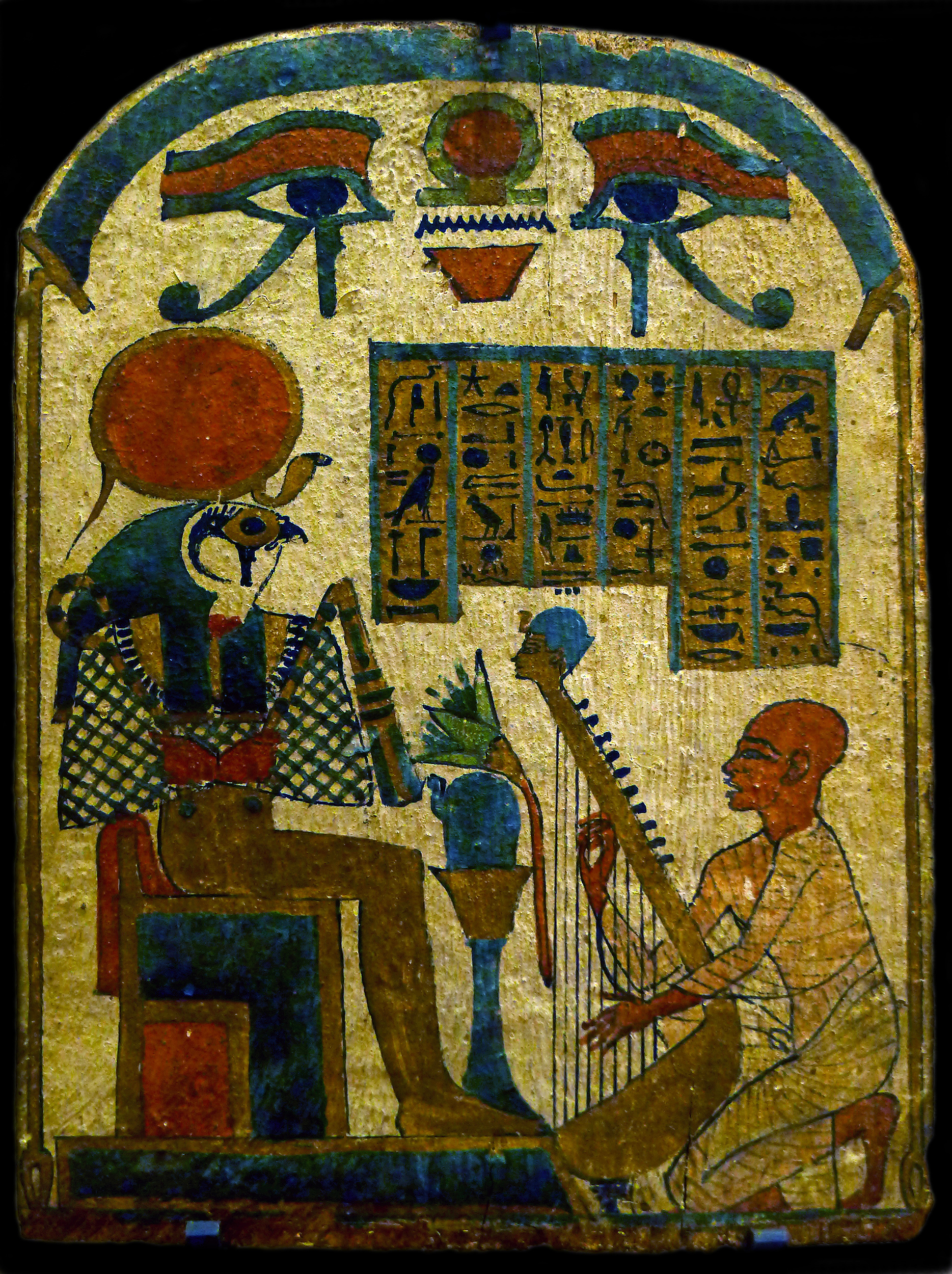
Colored stele of a harpist, Room 10

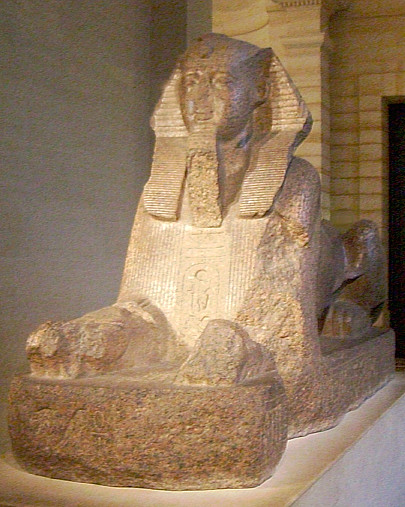
Sphinx of Tanis, Room 11

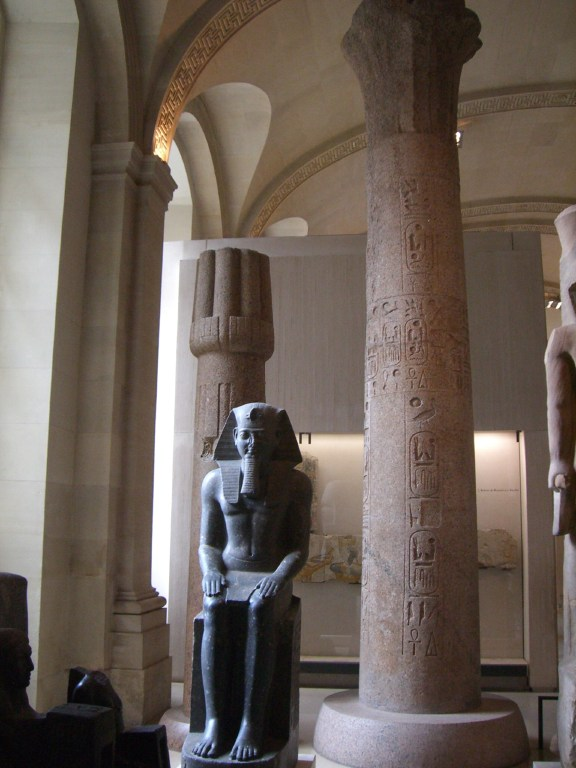
Colossal statue of Ramesses II, Room 12

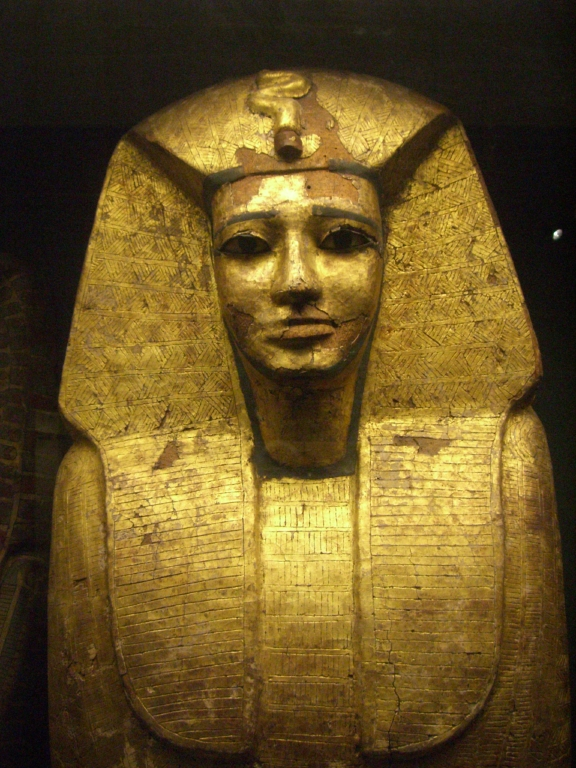
Sarcophagus of pharaoh Sekhemre-Wepmaat Intef, 17th dynasty, Room 13

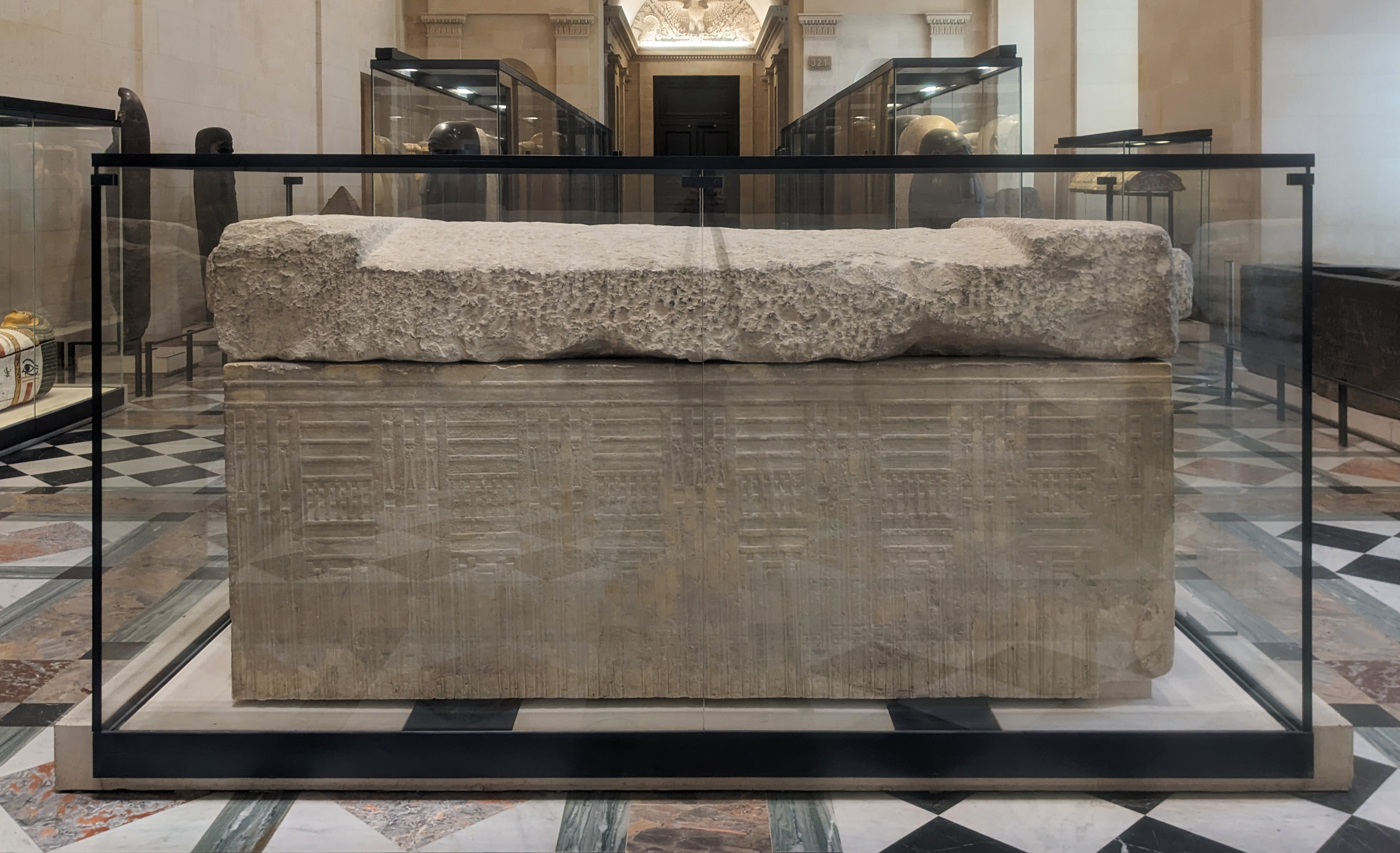
Sarcophagus from the palace of Abou Rawash, 4th dynasty, Room 14

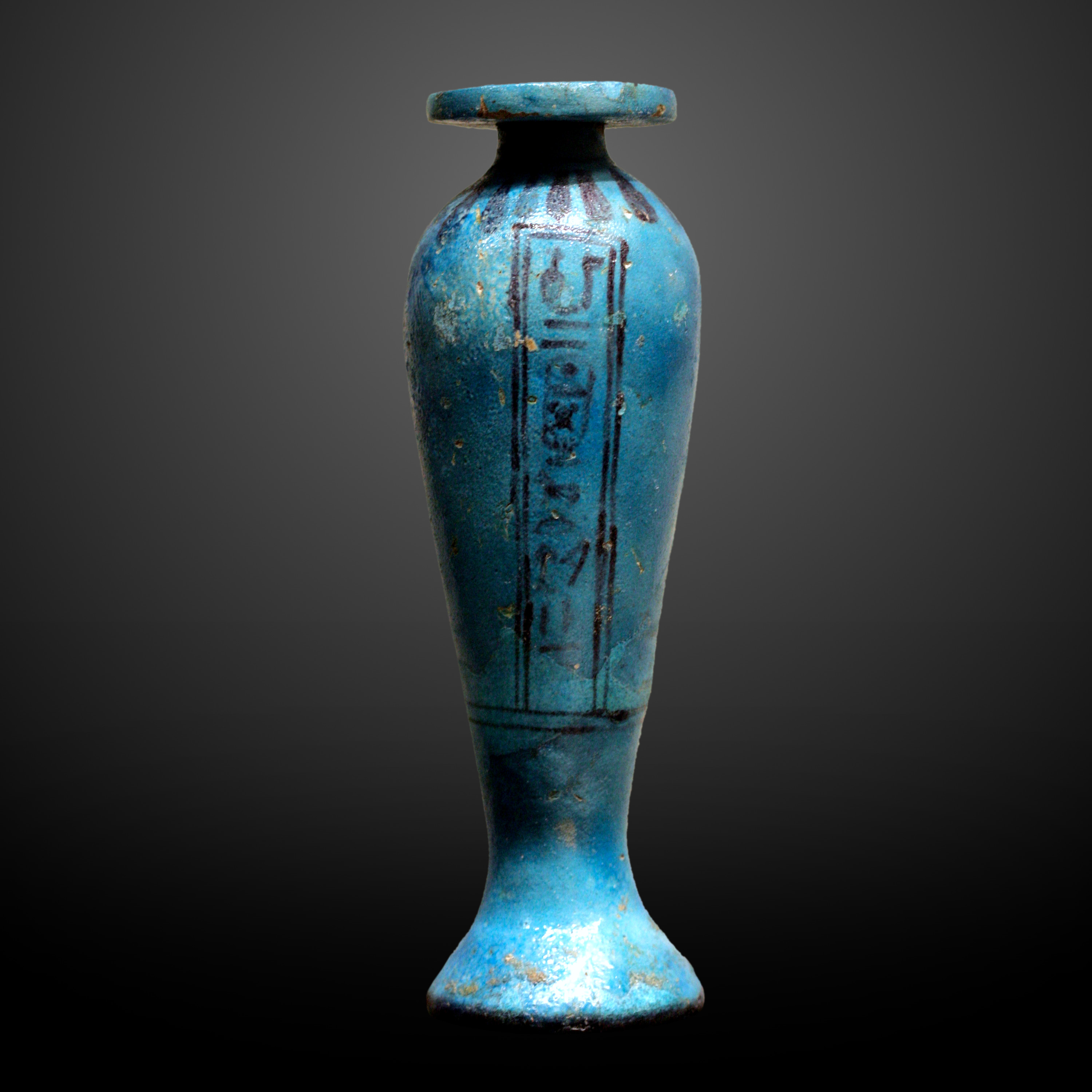
Libation vase in the name of Thutmose IV, Room 15

Rooms of the department are as follows:

- 1. Crypt of the sphinx.
- 2. Vestibule.
- 3. The Nile River.
- 4. Field labour. The mastaba.
- 5. Animal husbandry, hunting and fishing.
- 6. Writing and scribes.
- 7. Materials and techniques.
- 8. The home and furniture.
- 9. Jewels, clothing, and body care.
- 10. Leisure: Music and games.
- 11. The forecourt of the temple.
- 12. The temple.
- 13. Crypt of Osiris. The royal tomb.
- 14. Sarcophagi.
- 15. Mummies, embalming and burial.
- 16. Tombs.
- 17. The Book of The Dead. L'équipement funéraire.
- 18. Gods and magic.
- 19. Animals and the gods.
- 20. Naqaqa period. The end of prehistory
- 21. Thinite period. The first two dynasties.
- 22. The Old Kingdom. Seated Scribe.
- 23. The Middle Kingdom.
- 24. The New Kingdom.
- 25. The New Kingdom: the period of Akhenaton and Nefertiti.
- 26. The New Kingdom: Tutankhamun and his successors.
- 27. The New Kingdom: The period of Ramses.
- 28. The New Kingdom: The period of Ramses. Princes and courtisans.
- 29. The Third Intermediate Period. The Saite period. The beginnings of Persian domination.
- 30. From the last Egyptian Pharaohs to Cleopatra. The Nectenebos, Alexander the Great, and the Ptolemy dynasty. A: Roman Egypt. B: Coptic Egypt. C: The room Baouit.
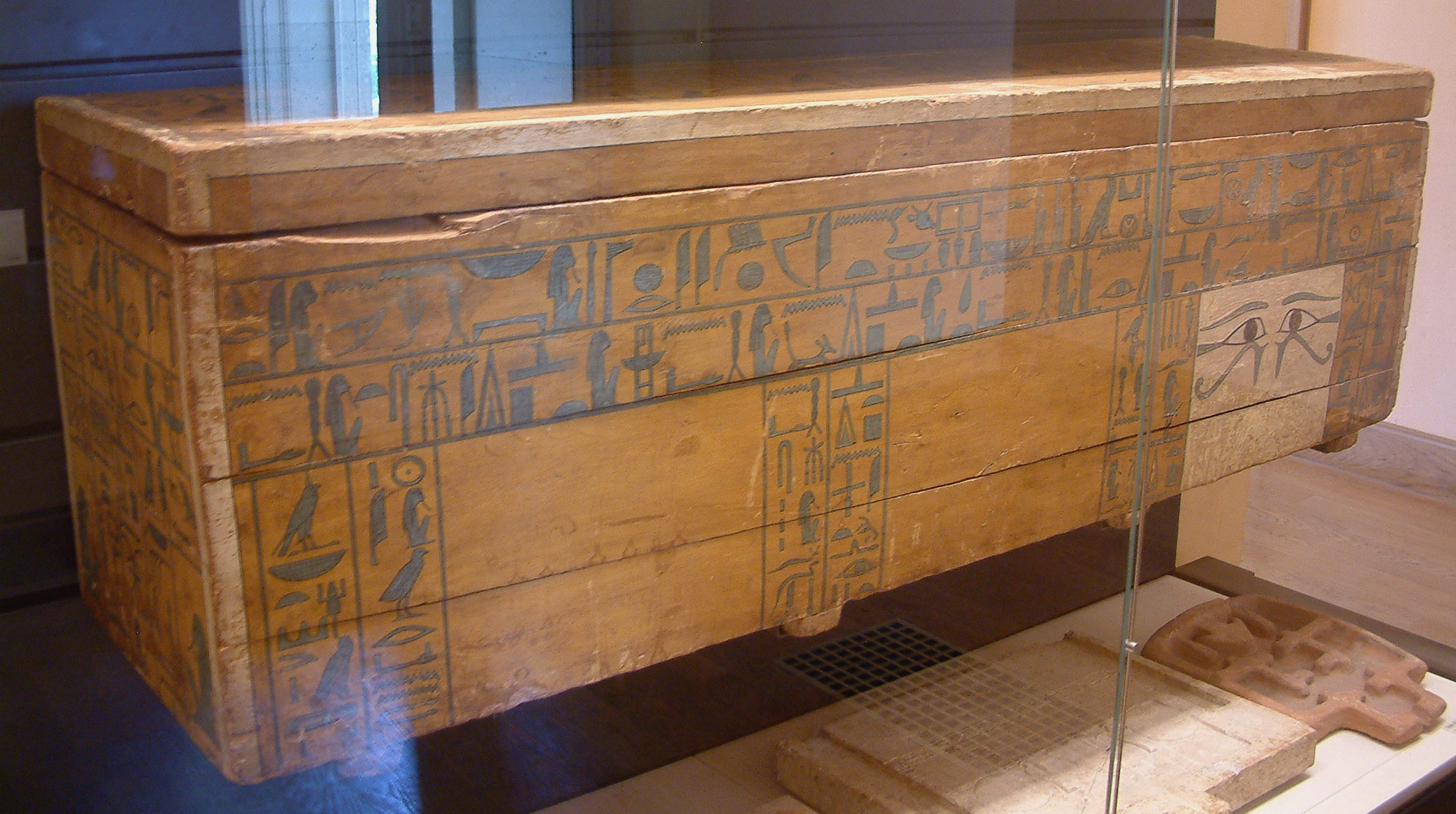
Outer sarcophagus of Chancellor Nakhti, Room 16

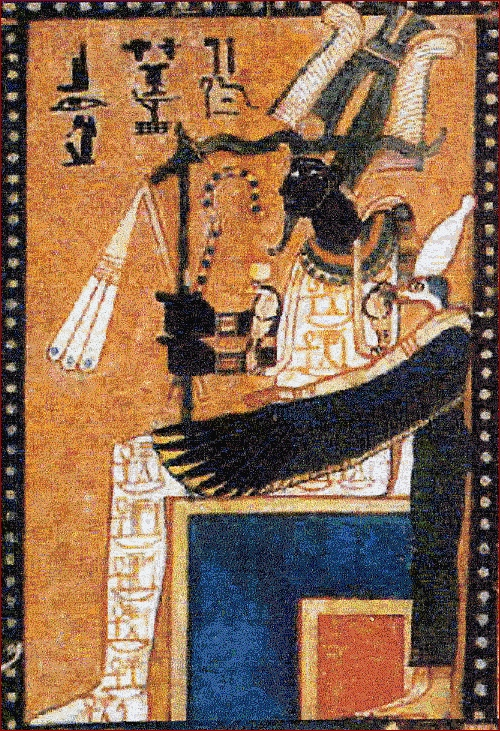
Osiris Book of the Dead, Room 17

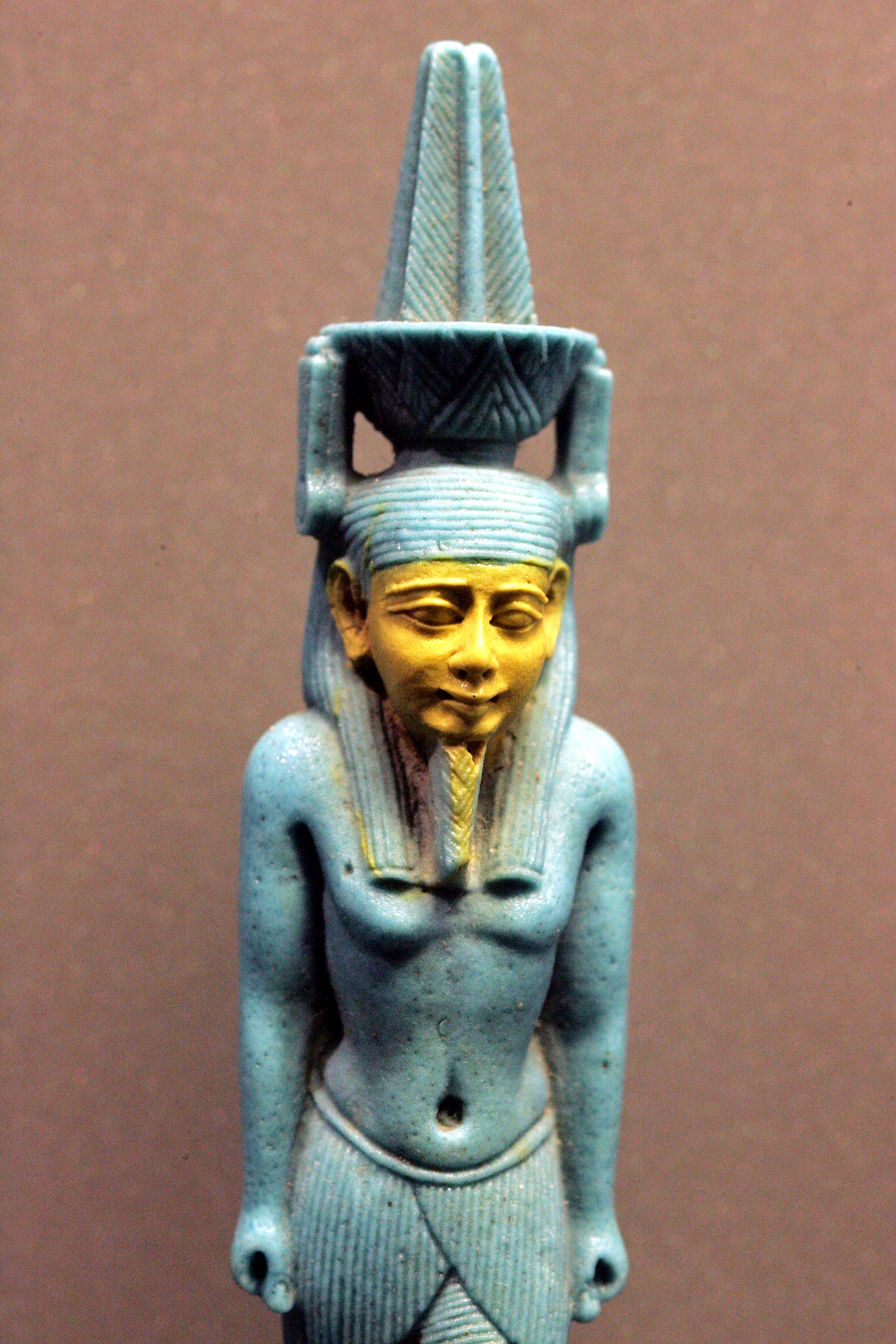
Nefertoum, Room 18

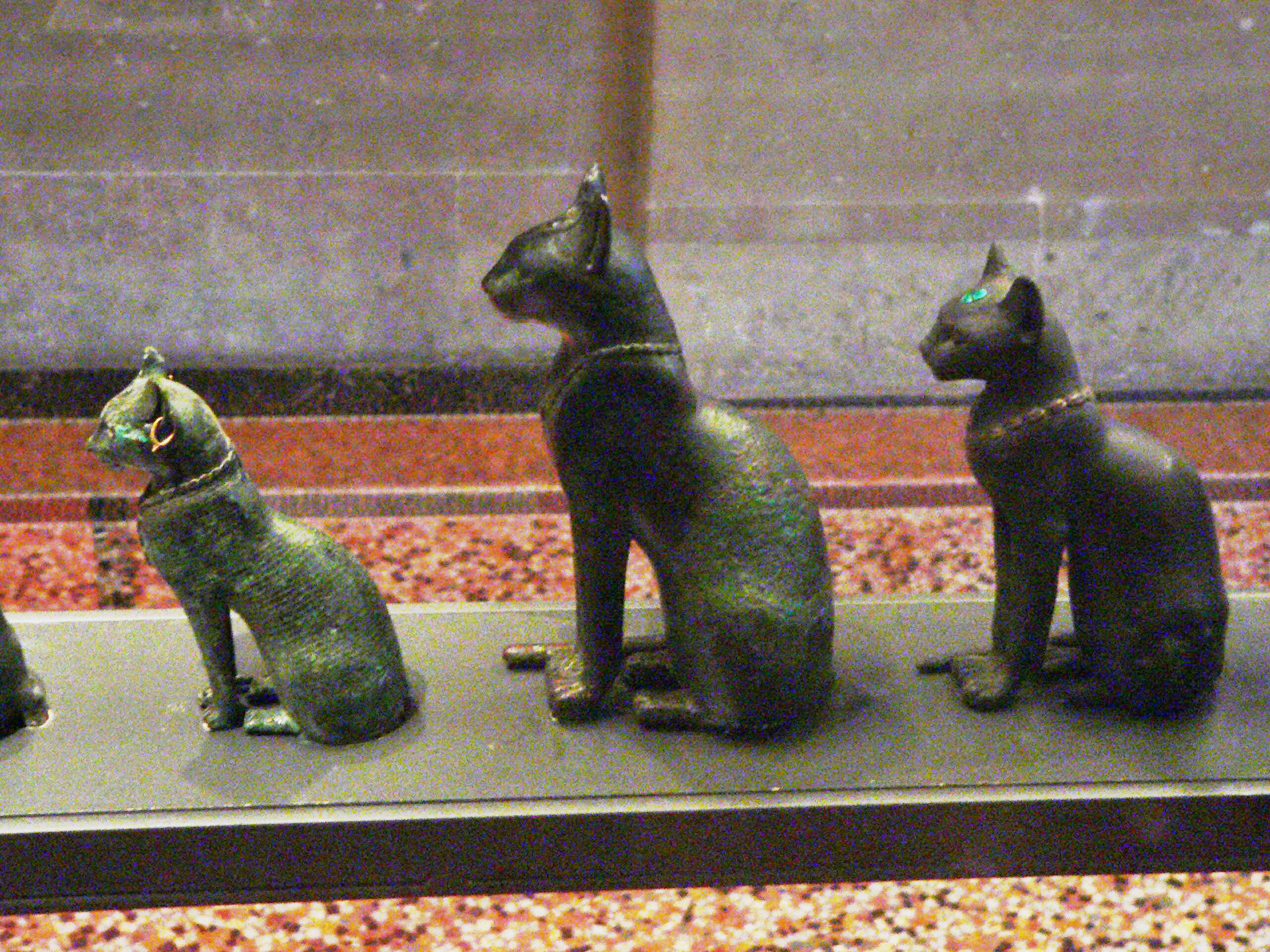
Bastet Cats, Room 19

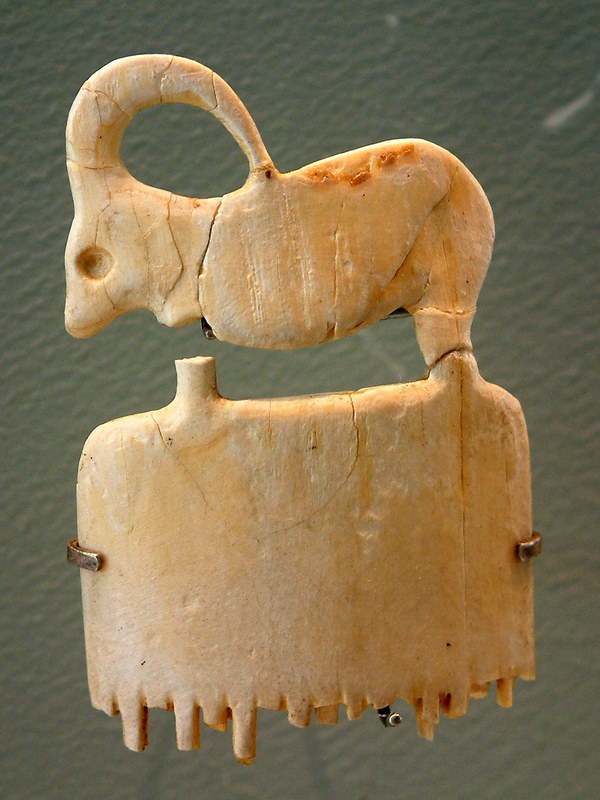
Ivory hippopotamus, Room 20

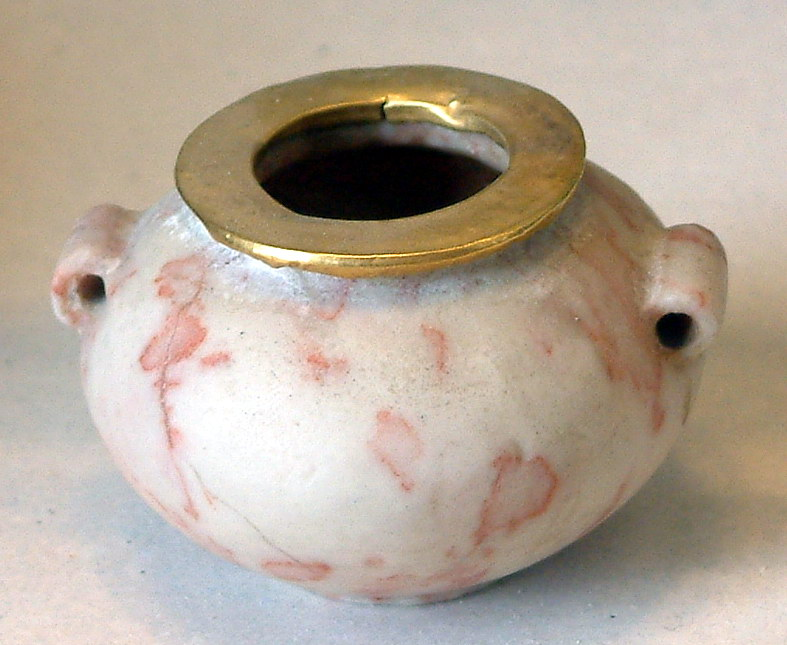
Miniature vase, Room 21

Stele, Room 22

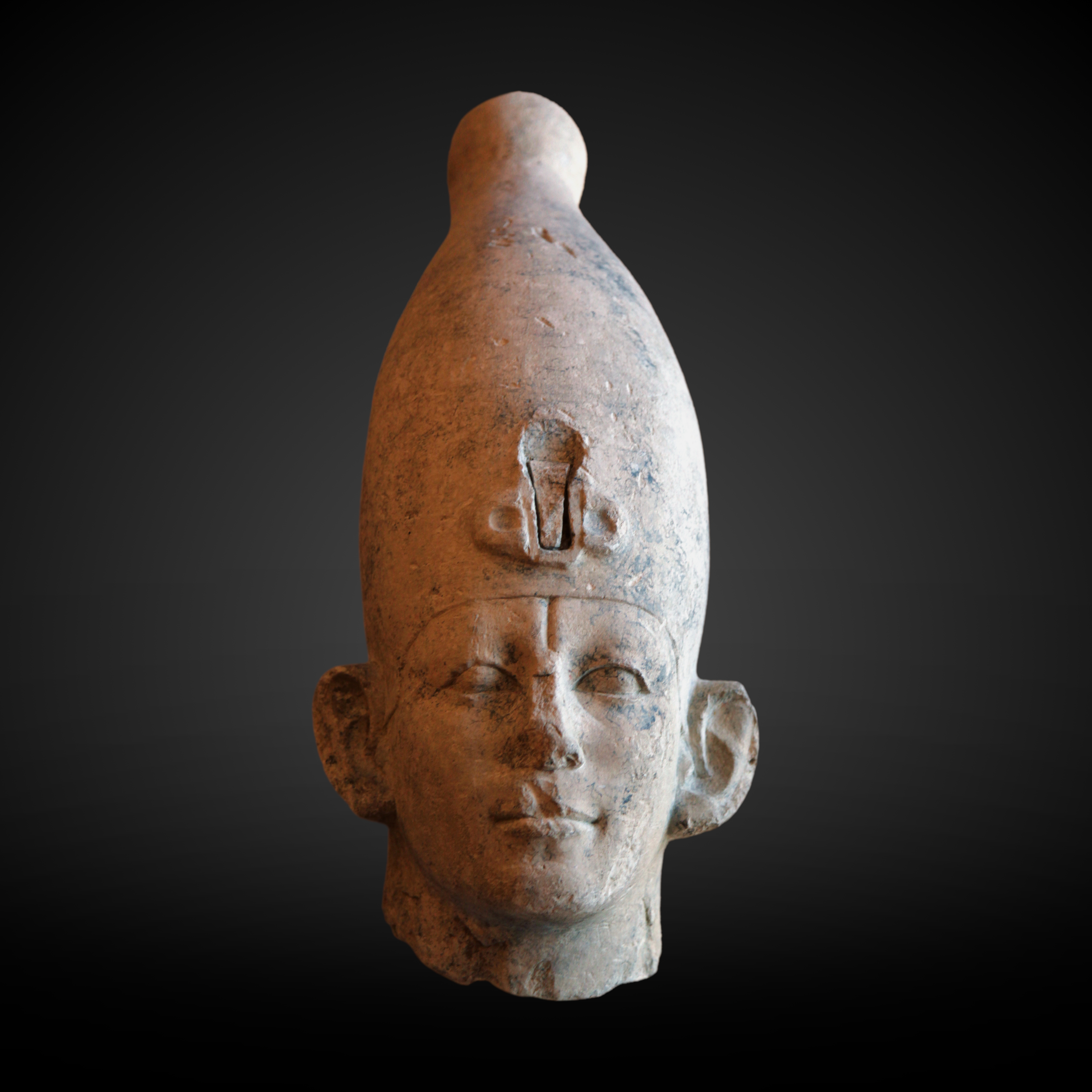
Statue Head of Senusret III, Room 23

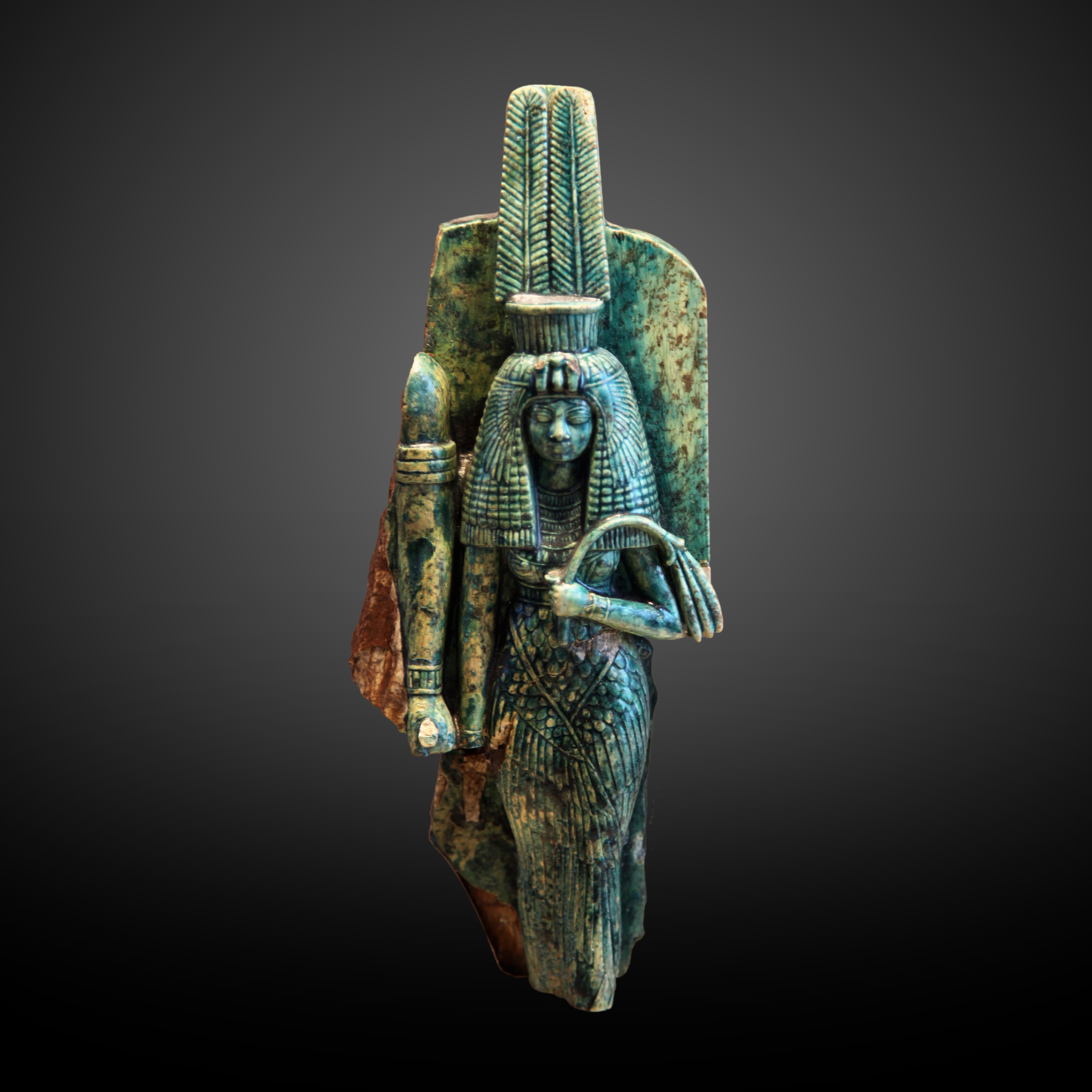
Queen Tiye, Room 24

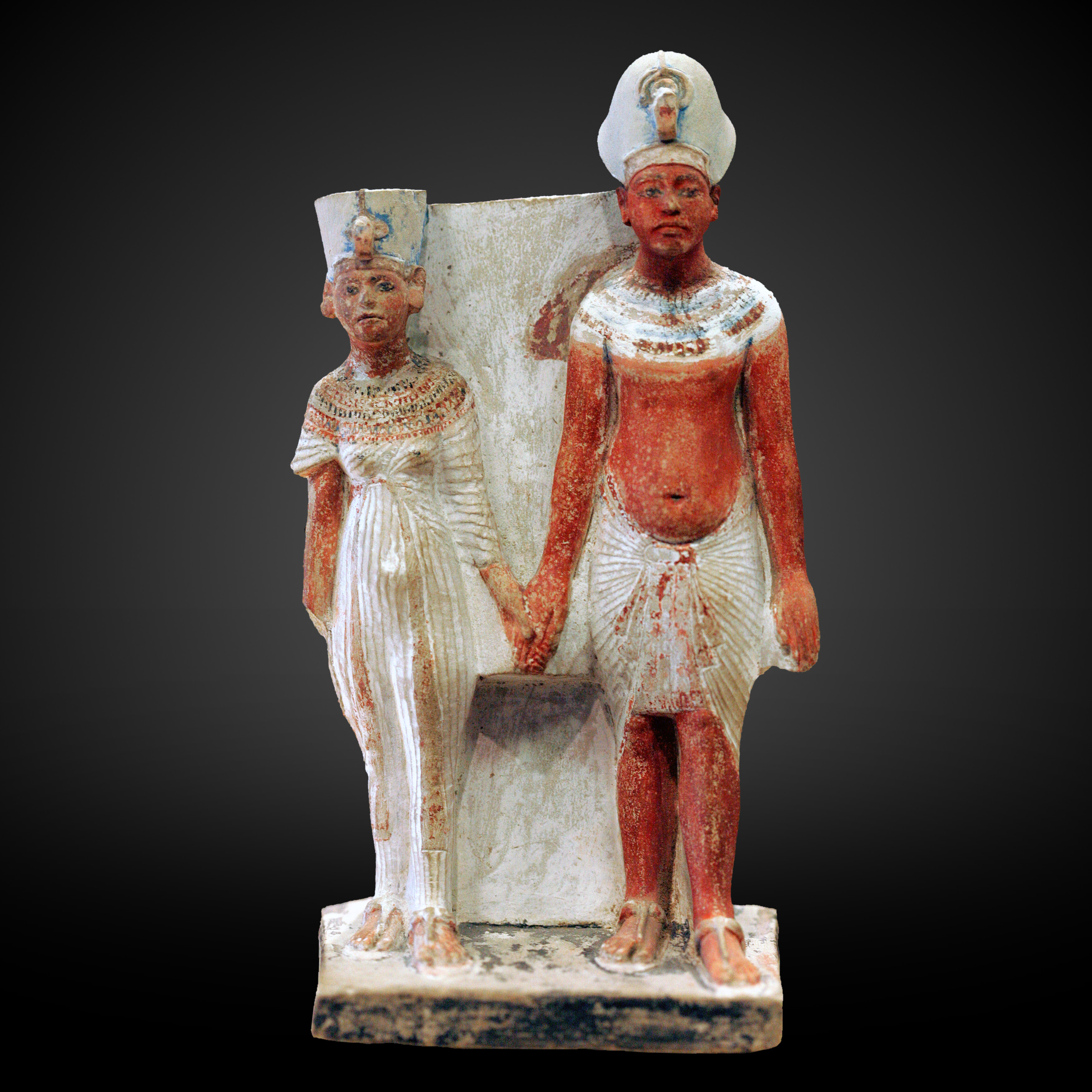
Nefertiti and Akhenathon, Room 25

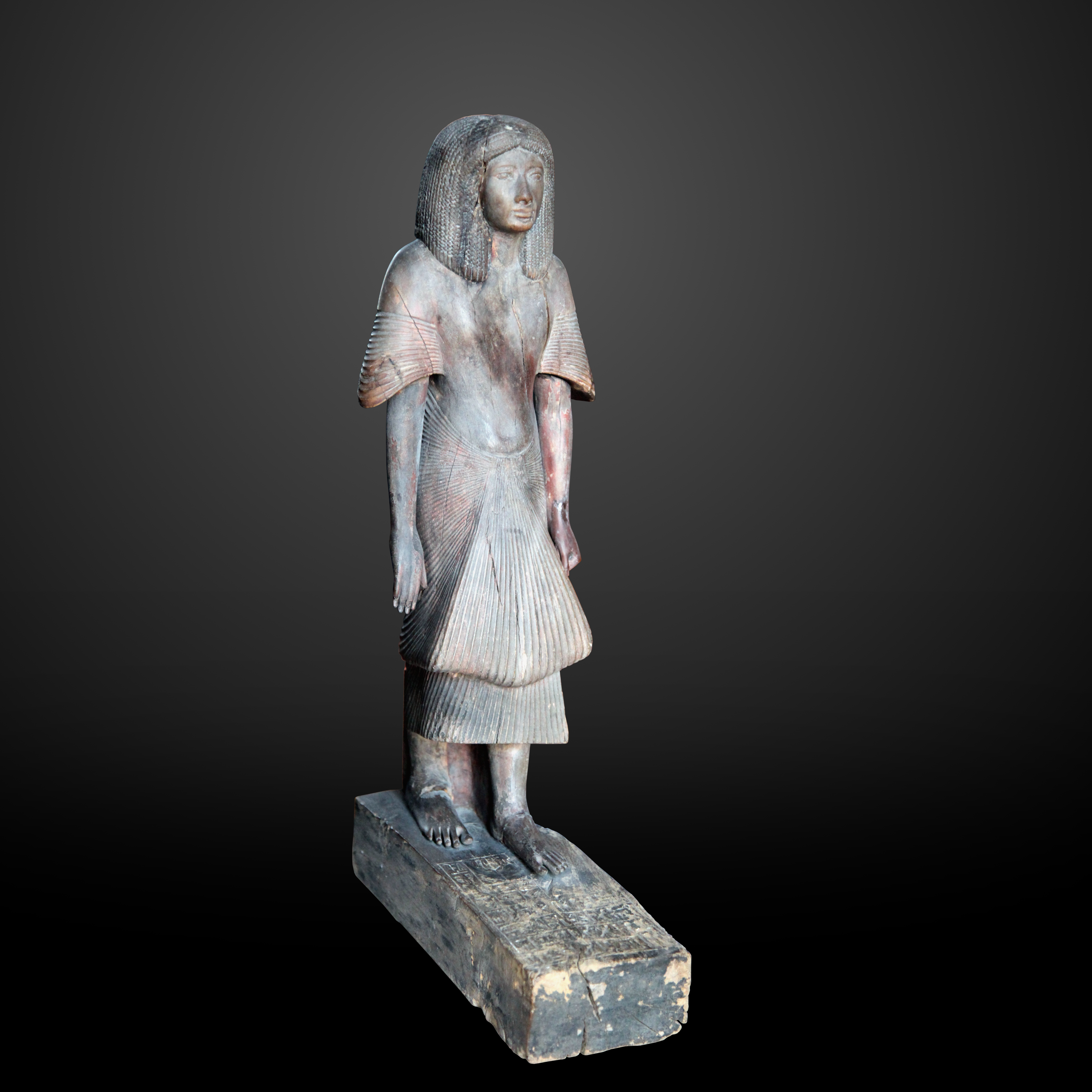
Piaÿ, doorkeeper of the Palace, Room 26

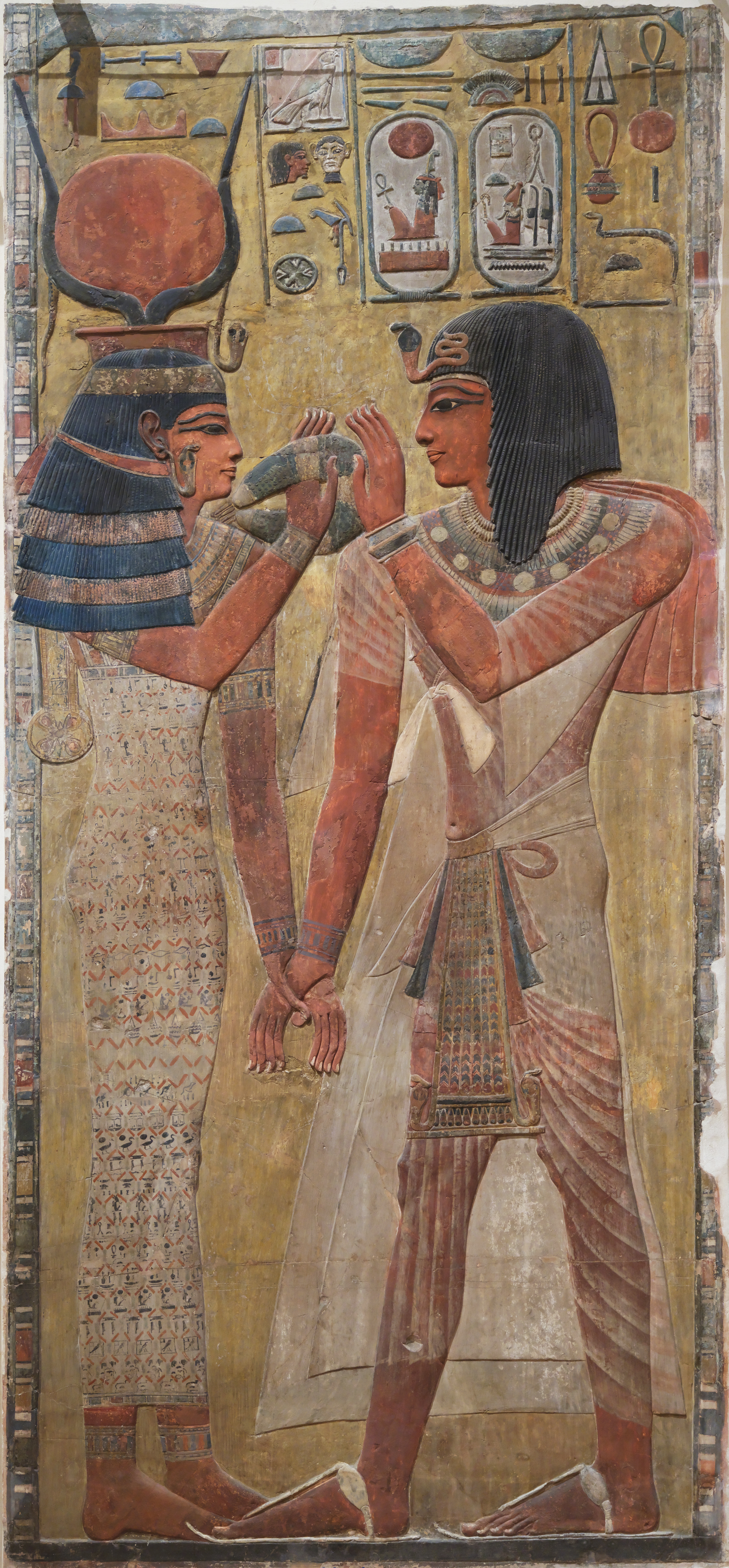
Hathor and Seti I, Room 27

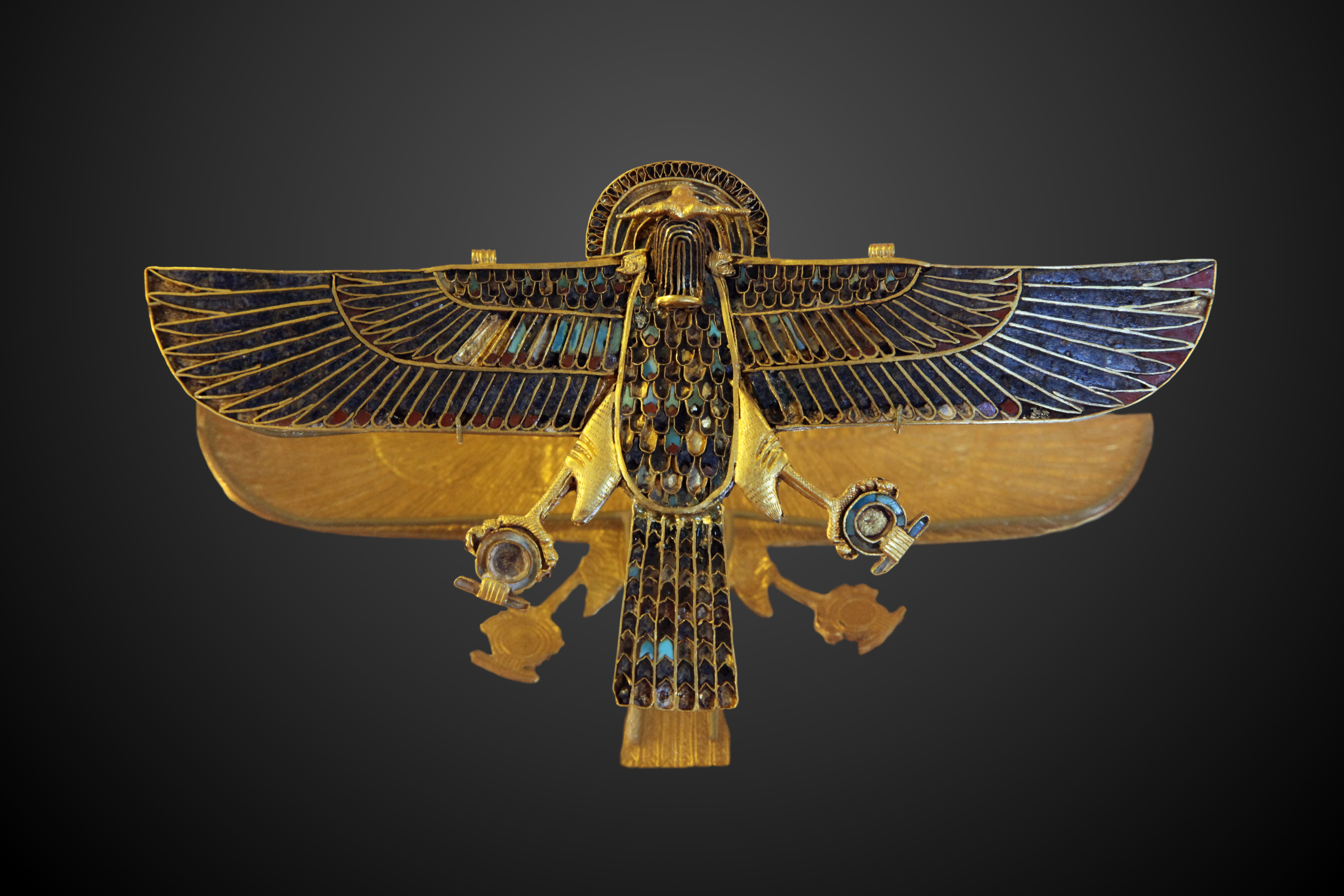
Amulet representing a ram-headed falcon, Room 28

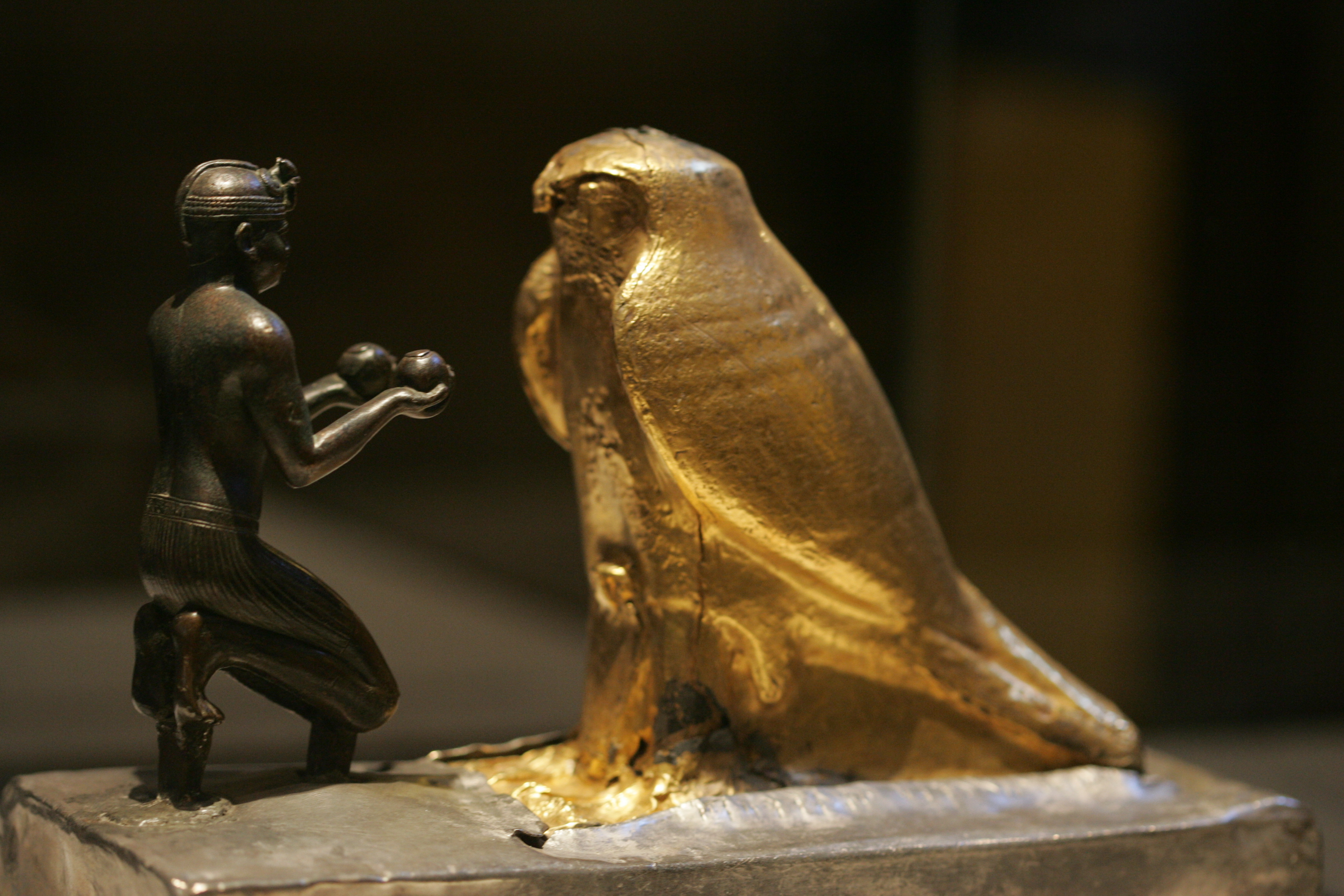
Taharqa presenting god Hemen with wine, Room 29

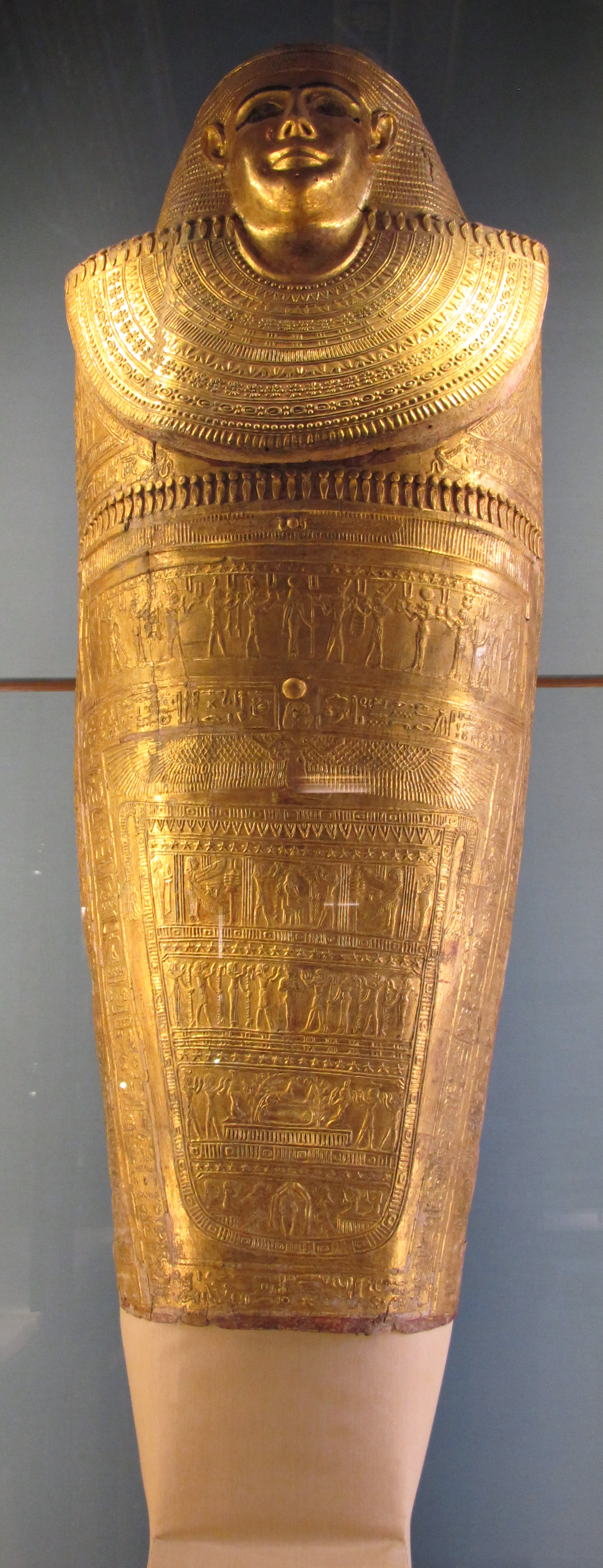
Mummy, Room 30

== Notable artifacts ==
Notable artifacts are as follows:

- Akhenaton and Nefertiti sculpture
- Amenophis IV sculpture
- Amulet belonging to Paser
- Angle harp
- Annals of Thutmosis III
- Aphrodite Anadyomene
- Bas-relief of Prince Khaemwaset
- Apis Bull
- Bas-reliefs from the Temple of Satet at Elephantine
- Base and feet of a colossus of Amenophis III
- Bastet
- Bead net for a mummy
- Beaker from a cemetery on Sai Island
- Body of a Woman sculpture (probably Nefertiti)
- Book of mythological images
- Bowl of General Djehuty
- Byzantine chandelier
- Cartonnage of Ankhpakhered
- Cat sculpture
- A chair from the 18th or 19th dynasty
- Chapel of the Tomb of Akhethotep
- Chelidona's Coffin
- Christ and Abbot Mena
- Coffin lid of King Antef
- Colossal statue of Rameses II
- Comb
- Cosmetic spoon
- Couple in Wood
- Cubit rod
- Cupids Picking Grapes
- Dagger from Gebel el-Arak
- Detachable headrest
- Divine standard
- Door lintel
- Drinking cup in the form of a lotus flower
- Eagle censer
- False door on the Stele of Sheshi
- Female Nude statue
- Figurine of a naked woman
- Figurine of a seated woman
- Foundation deposit from the Temple of Deir el-Bahri
- Four baboons adoring the rising sun
- Four Ramesses II vases
- Fragment of a funerary shroud, known as "Portrait of Ammonios"
- Fragment of a votive monument
- Fragment of the Book of the Dead
- Fragment of the Hunting Palette
- "Frog" oil lamp
- Funerary figurine of Ramesses IV
- Funerary furniture of Chancellor Nakhti
- Funerary hanging
- Funerary statue of a Priestess of Isis
- Funerary stele
- Funerary stele of a father
- Funerary stele with two orant figures
- Furniture legs in the form of a nude woman
- Gaia with Cupids
- Game board in the form of a hippo
- Game box in the name of Imenmes
- Gilded cartonnage of the lady Tasheret-pa-ankh
- Great Sphinx of Tanis
- Guarded Lion of the Chapel of the Serapeum of Saqqara
- Head of a colossal statue of Amenophis III
- Head of a sphinx of King Djedefre
- Hippo figurine
- Hoe
- Horus sculpture
- Horus on horseback sculpture
- Hypocephalus of Irethorrou
- Imhotep the Wise Deified
- Inventory and accounts from a temple of Abusir
- Jar with portrait
- Jonah wall-hanging
- Khabekhent's funerary servant and ushabti chest
- Knucklebones
- Kohl pot in the form of a Nubian porter *Kohl Recipient:the god Bes
- Krater
- Large bottle with vine-leaf decoration
- Large statue of Chancellor Nakht
- Legging
- Lintel from the tomb of Pairkep
- Mask of a Woman of the 1st century
- Mortuary Mask of Khaemwaset
- Mummy in painted shroud
- Mummy label
- Mummy Mask of the early 12th Dynasty
- Mummy mask of a boy
- Mummy mask of a man with headrest
- Mummy mask of a woman
- Mummy of a man
- Mummy of a woman with portrait
- Mummy shroud and mask
- Mummy's head
- Necklace with fish pendants
- Nile fishing scene
- Nude male statuette
- Offering table found at Meroe
- Offering-bearer of the 12th Dynasty
- Ostrakon with a royal profile
- Paintings from the tomb of Metjetji
- Paintings from the tomb of Unsu
- Pair of clappers
- Pair of sandals
- Palm column of King Unas
- Panel of the Virgin Annunciate
- Panel portrait of a man
- Patera
- Pendant of King Osorkon II
- Pendant falcon of Ramesses II
- Pilgrim flasks
- Pillar believed to be from Bawit
- Pinudjem's necklace
- Portraits of men and women
- Processional way of sphinxes
- Pyxis or pyx
- Queen Ahmose Nefertari figure
- Queen Cleoptrat Making an Offering
- Queen Khenemet-Nefer-Hedjet figurine
- Queen Tiye
- Ram Pendant
- Ramesses II breastplate
- Recipient with bowls
- Reconstruction of a tomb of the cemetery of Deir el-Medina
- Red terracotta canopic jars
- Relief from the Temple of Monthu at Tod
- Ring of Horemheb
- Ring with horses
- Royal and divine triad
- Royal Sphinx of Pharaoh Achoris
- Sarcophagus box of Ramesses III
- Sarcophagus of Abu Roash
- Sarcophagus of Dioscorides
- Sarcophagus of Iniuia
- Scene in the Nile marshes
- Scribe's palette
- Sennerfer's necklace
- Sennefer, the king's head
- Senusret, chief of the treasury
- Shabti of Amenophis III
- Shroud of a child's mummy
- Sistreum of Henuttawy
- Sobek-Re
- Southern Church of Bawit
- Spoon in the form of a bound ibex
- Spoon in the form of a young girl
- Sprang cap
- Square of fabric
- St. Menas
- Statue of a priest of Bastet
- Statue of Amenemhetankh
- Statue of Karomana
- Statue of King Nectanebo II
- Statue of Nakhthorheb
- Statue of Osiris
- Statue of Pendua and his father
- Statue of Rakherka
- Statue of the god Bes
- Statue of the goddess Sekhmet
- Statue of Wahibre
- Statue of Sepa and Nesa
- Statuette de femme nue
- Statueette of a young boy
- Statuette of King Ammenemes III
- Statuette of Taharqa
- Statuette of the crocodile-headed god Sobek
- Statuette of Tuy
- Statuette of Isis nursing Horus
- Stele dated to Ramesses II
- Stele of the master craftsman of the 11th Dynasty
- Stele of the Serpent King of the 1st Dynasty
- Stele of Princess Nefertiabet (4th dynasty) eating
- Tablet of an apprentice scribe
- Tamutnefret's coffins
- The four canopic jars of Horesmsaf
- The god Amun protecting Tutankhamun
- The goddess Hathor welcomes Sethos
- The harpist's stele
- The sarcophagus of Madja
- The Scribe Nebmeretef
- The Seated Scribe
- The Tod Treasure
- The Tyre of Constantinople
- The Zodiac of Dendera
- Three cups from the Tod treasure
- Three throwsticks
- Torso of a Ptolemaic King
- Toy
- Tunic of pleated linen
- "Twenty Squares" game board
- Two-sided stele of Dedia
- Vase in the form of an ibex
- Vase in the form of the god Bes
- Vase with the name of King Wenis
- Wall from a temple of Ramessus II
- Wall of the tomb of Akhetaa
- Wall tile from the 20th Dynasty
- Water jars and stand
- Water pot in the name of the vizier Paser
- Woman in a Cloak statue
- Woman's shroud
