= Amenmose =

i mn n F31 s
Amenmose
in hieroglyphs
Era: New Kingdom
(1550–1069 BC)

Amenmose, Amenmoses, Amenmesses or Amenmesse was an Egyptian name, found during the Late Bronze Age. Bearers of the name include:

- Amenmesse, the rival Pharaoh to Seti II
- Amenmose (prince), a son of Thutmose I
- Amenmose (TT42), nobleman during the reigns of Thutmose III and Amenhotep II, buried in TT42
- Amenmose (noble), nobleman during the reign of Amenhotep III
- Amenmose, Son of Pendjerty, a royal scribe from the time of Ramesses II
- Amenmose (Vizier), a vizier dated to the reigns of King Sethi II and Amenmesse
- Amenmose, a commissioner, mentioned in the Amarna letters as Amanmašša
- Amenmose, an Overseer of Artificers of Amun, buried in TT70
- Imenmes (Amenmose), Overseer of the Cattle of Amun, late 18th dynasty
