= The Seated Scribe =

Egyptian sculpture dating from the Old Kingdom period

- pika
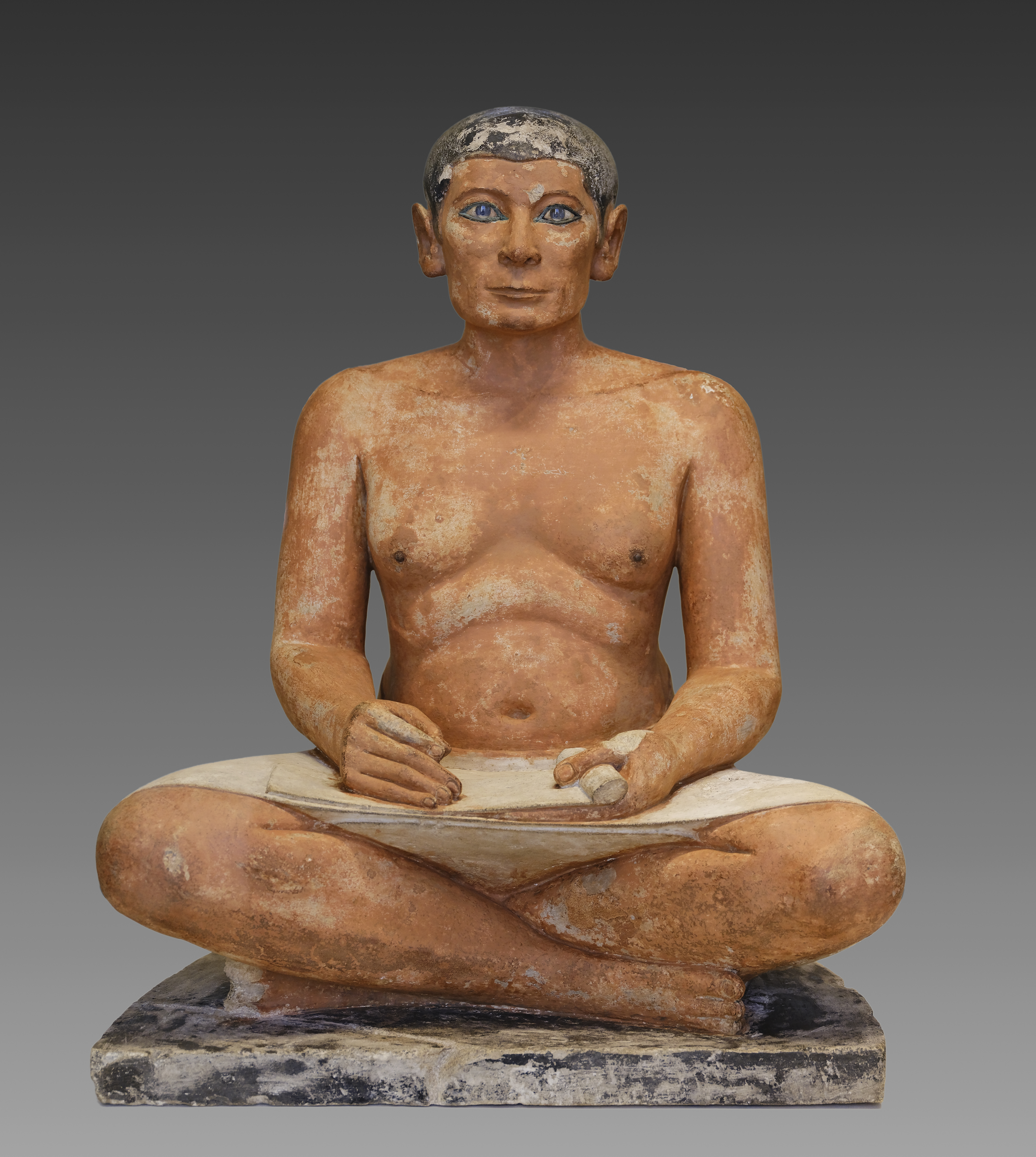
- Medium: limestone
- Dimensions: 53.7 cm (21.1 in) × 44 cm (17 in) × 35 cm (14 in)
- Location: Louvre
- Owner: French State
- Collection: Department of Egyptian Antiquities of the Louvre
- Accession No.: E 3023

The sculpture of the Seated Scribe or Squatting Scribe is a famous work of ancient Egyptian art. It represents a figure of a seated scribe at work. The sculpture was discovered at Saqqara, north of the alley of sphinxes leading to the Serapeum of Saqqara, in 1850, and dated to the period of the Old Kingdom, from either the 5th Dynasty, c. 2450–2325 BCE or the 4th Dynasty, 2620–2500 BCE. It is now in the Louvre.

It is a painted limestone statue, the eyes inlaid with rock crystal, magnesite (magnesium carbonate), copper-arsenic alloy, and nipples made of wood.

== Description ==
This painted limestone sculpture represents a man in a seated position, presumably a scribe. The figure is dressed in a white kilt stretched to its knees. It is holding a half rolled papyrus. Perhaps the most striking part aspect of the figure is its face. Its realistic features stand in contrast to perhaps more rigid and somewhat less detailed body. The hands, fingers, and fingernails of the sculpture are delicately modeled. The hands are in writing position.

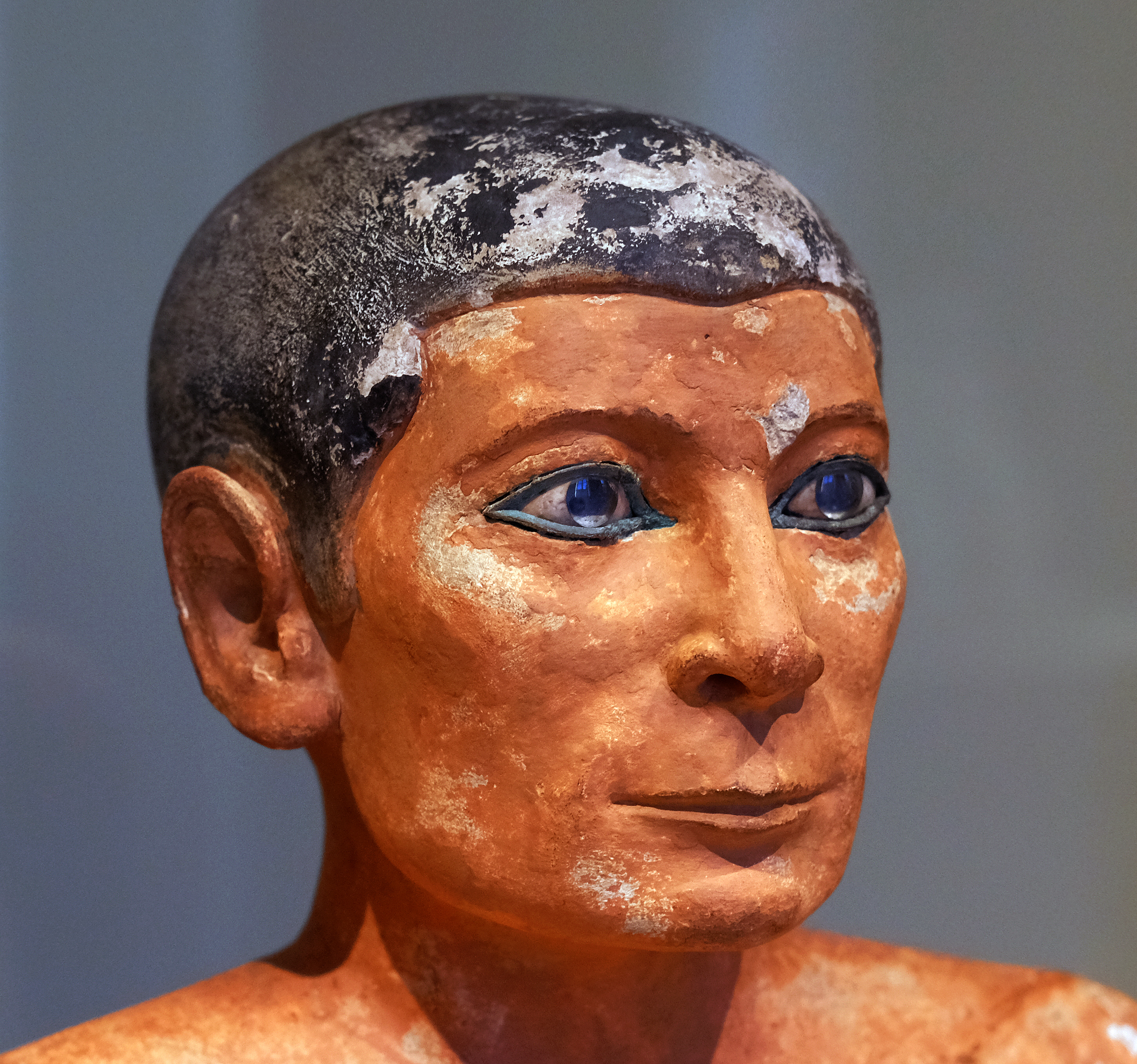
Detail

Special attention was devoted to the eyes of the sculpture. They are modeled in rich detail out of pieces of red-veined white magnesite which were elaborately inlaid with pieces of polished truncated rock crystal. The back side of the crystal was covered with a layer of organic material which at the same time gives the blue colour to the iris and serves as an adhesive. Two copper clips hold each eye in place. The eyebrows are marked with fine lines of dark organic paint.

The scribe has a soft and slightly overweight body, suggesting he is well off and does not need to do any sort of physical labor. He sits in a cross-legged position that would have been his normal posture at work. His facial expression is alert and attentive, gazing out to the viewer as though he is waiting for them to start speaking. He has a ready-made papyrus scroll laid out on his lap but the reed-brush used to write is missing. Both his hands are positioned on his lap. His right hand is pointing towards the paper as if he has already started to write while watching others speak. He stares calmly at the viewer with his black outlined eyes.

== History ==
The sculpture of the seated scribe was discovered in Saqqara on 19 November 1850, to the north of the Serapeum's line of sphinxes by French archeologist Auguste Mariette. The precise location remains unknown, as the document describing these excavations was published posthumously and the original excavation journal has been lost.

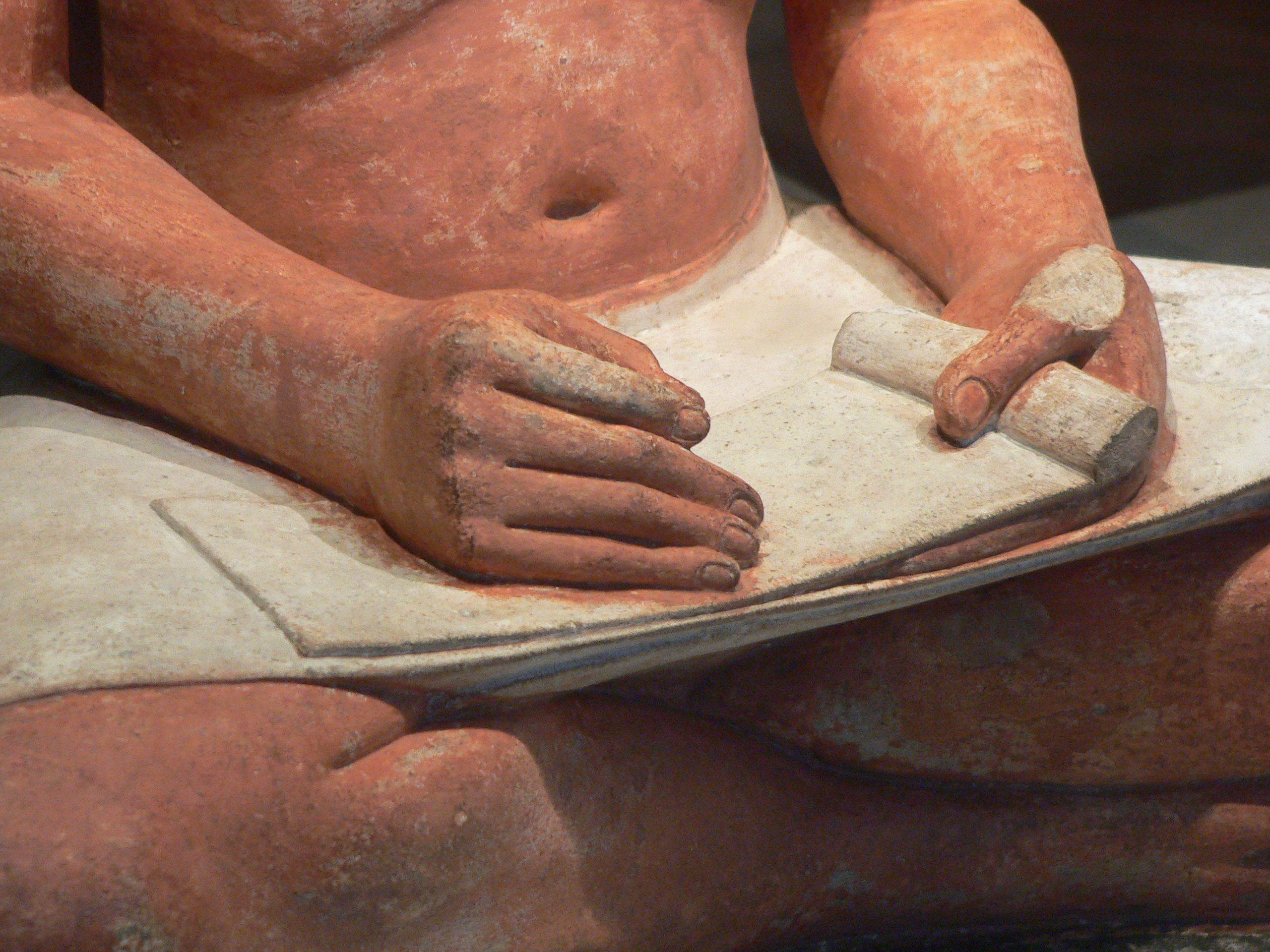
Detail

The identity of the person represented remains unknown. The semicircular base of the sculpture suggests that it originally fitted in a larger piece of rock which presumably carried its name and title. This somewhat unusual pose was, it seems, reserved for members of the immediate royal family, although not for the king himself. The statue was dated to the period of the 4th Dynasty, 2620–2500 BC, and is usually associated to the person of Pehernefer. Certain stylistic characteristics, unusual thin lips, broad chest and the posture of the torso might support this theory. The dating itself remains uncertain; the period of the 6th Dynasty has also been suggested. One additional fact in favor of the earlier date is that the statue is represented in "writing" position while it seems that scribes from the period after the 5th Dynasty have been portrayed mainly in "reading" position.

The Seated Scribe was made around 2450–2325 BCE; it was discovered near a tomb made for an official named Kai and is sculpted from limestone. Many pharaohs and high-ranking officials would have their servants depicted in some form of image or sculpture so that when they went to the afterlife they would be able to utilize their skills to help them in their second life. The scribes were some of the very few who knew how to read and write, and were highly regarded and well-paid. Most people were peasant farmers who had no need for literacy, and "although some members of the royal family and high status individuals, as well as officials, priests, and army officers were literate, scribes were needed for operations of the state at all levels." Scribes were used for multitude of things involving everyday Egyptian life, they would be used as tax collectors and were in charge of organizing personnel for activities such as mining, trade and war. Scribes were also used to work on projects like pyramid building and helped communicate between the rulers and the Egyptian people.

Details and similar works
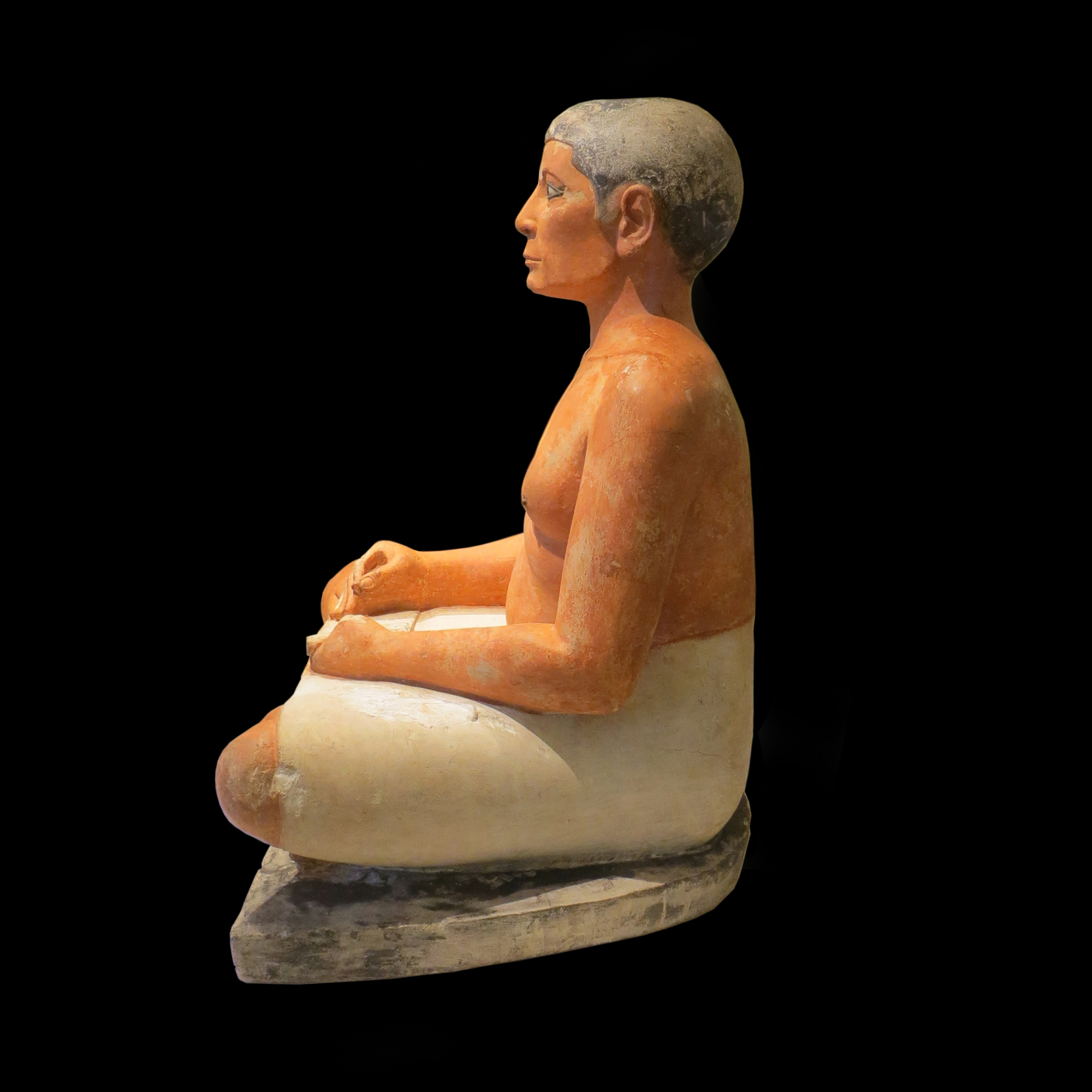
Side view

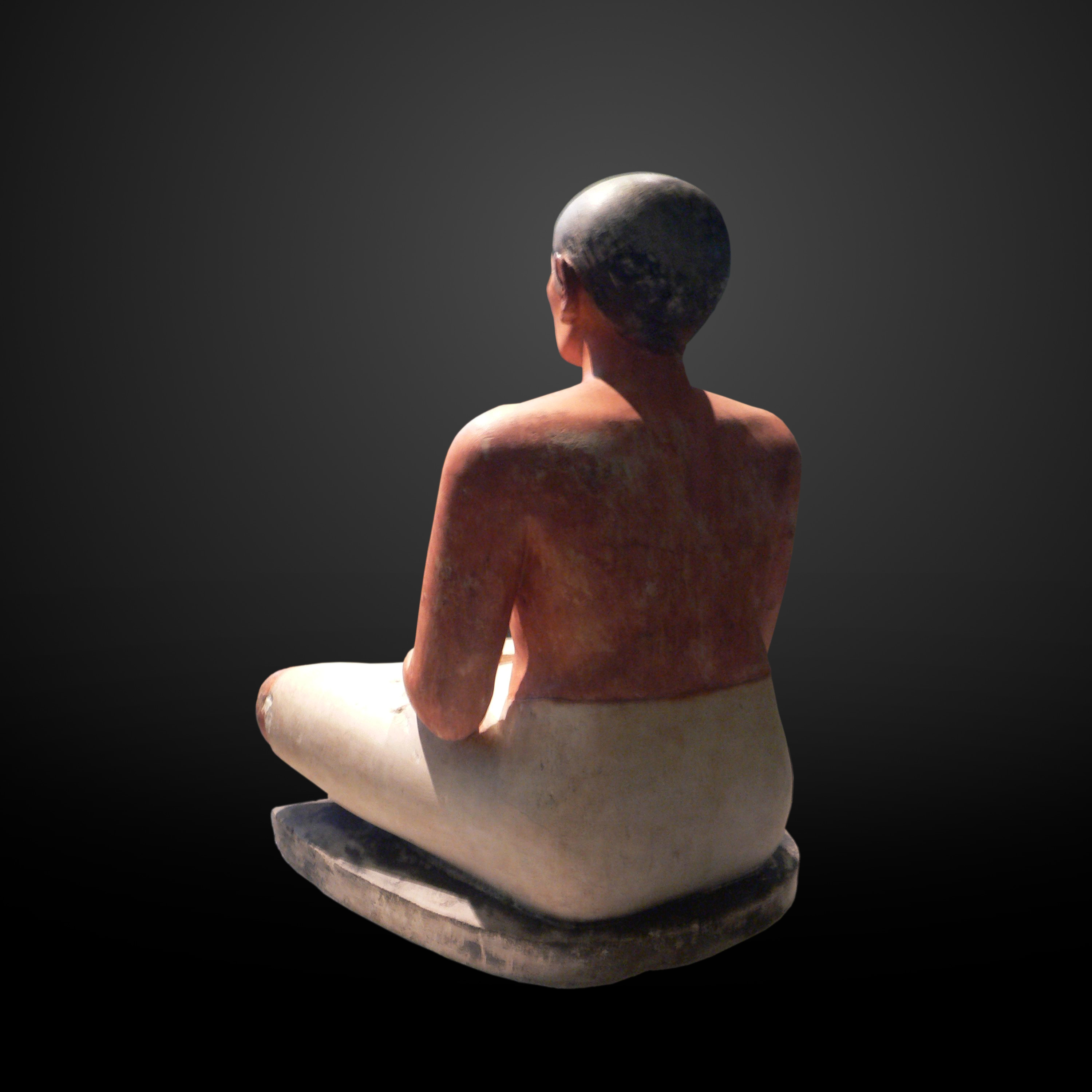
From the rear

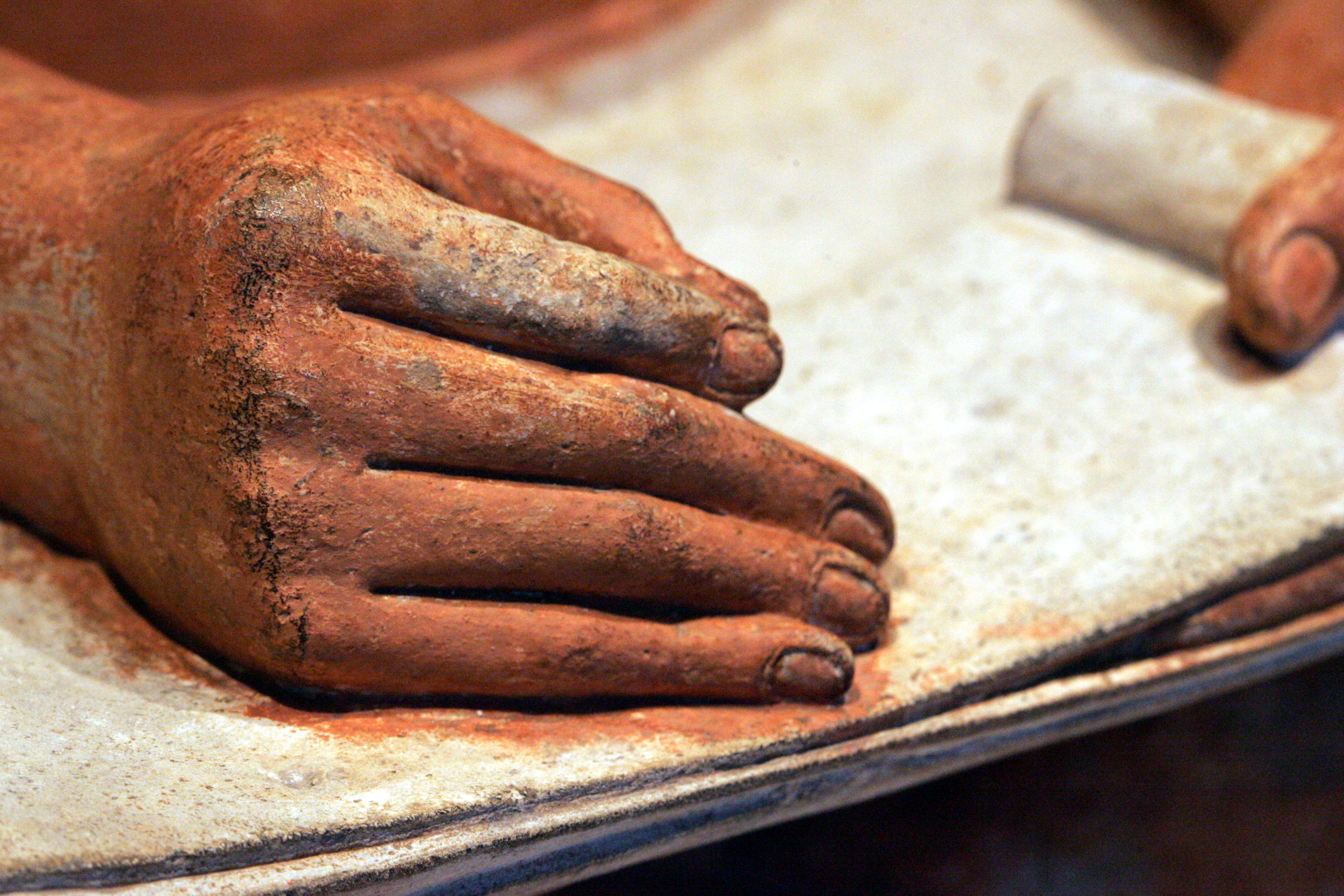
Hand

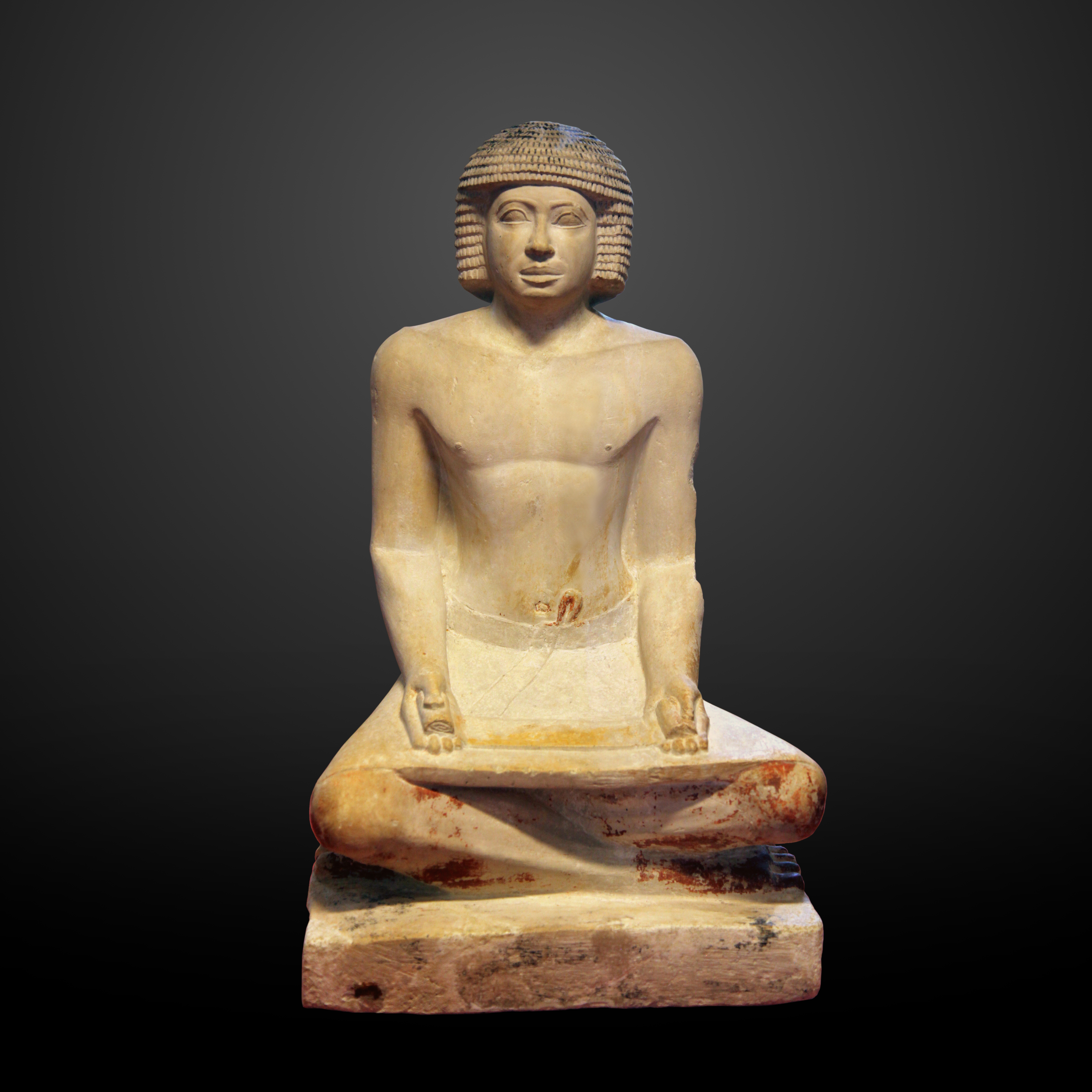
A 42, another seated 5th Dynasty scribe on display at the Louvre

External videos
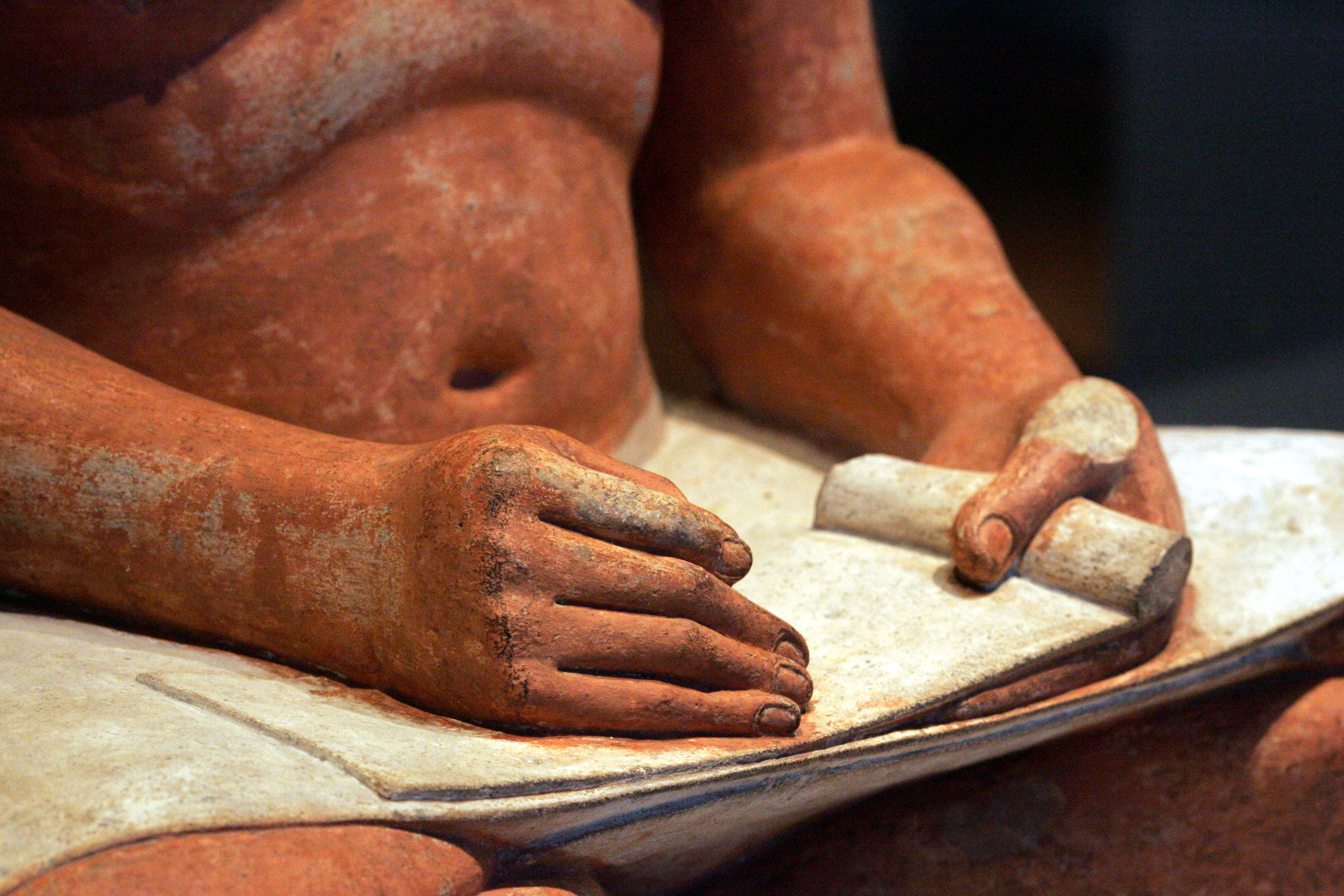
- Au Louvre ! Le scribe accroupi, Louvre
- Seated Scribe, Smarthistory

== See also ==
- List of ancient Egyptian scribes
