= Great Sphinx of Tanis =

Ancient Egyptian granite sculpture

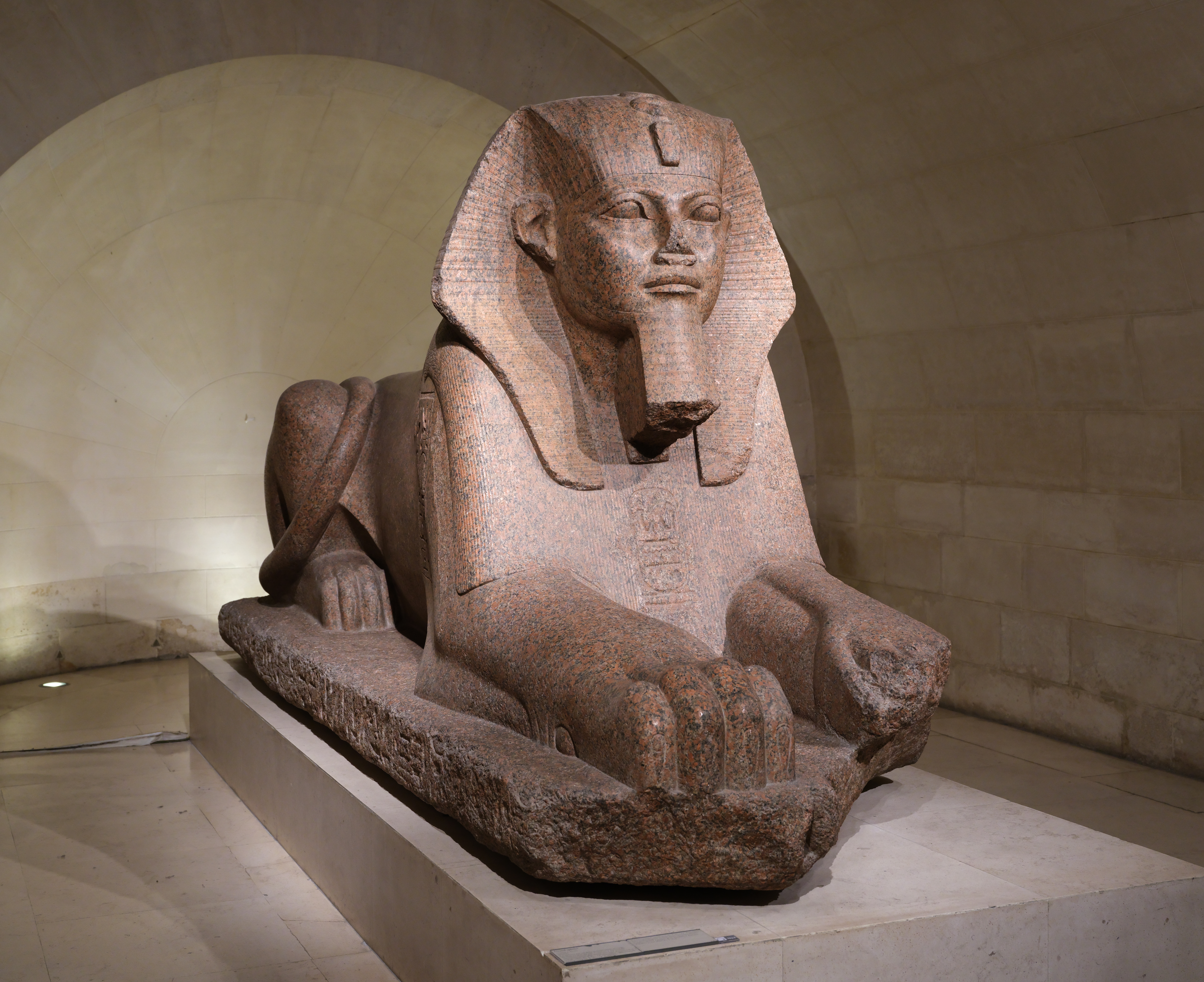
- Material: Pink granite
- Length: 480 cm (190 in)
- Height: 183 cm (72 in)
- Width: 154 cm (61 in)
- Created: possibly as early as 26th century BC
- Discovered: Tanis, Egypt
- Present location: Louvre, Paris, France
- Identification: A23
- Culture: Ancient Egyptian

The Great Sphinx of Tanis is an ancient Egyptian pink granite sculpture of a sphinx. It was discovered in the ruins of the Temple of Amun-Ra in Tanis, Egypt's capital during the 21st and the 22nd dynasties. It was created much earlier, but when exactly remains debated with hypotheses of the 4th Dynasty (26th century BC) or the 12th Dynasty. All that is left of the earliest inscription mentions the reign of pharaoh Amenemhat II of the 12th Dynasty; later rulers took the opportunity to add their inscriptions to the sphinx, namely Aaqenenre Apophis of the 15th Dynasty (although the mention is uncertain), Merneptah of the 19th Dynasty, and Shoshenq I of the 22nd Dynasty.

== History ==
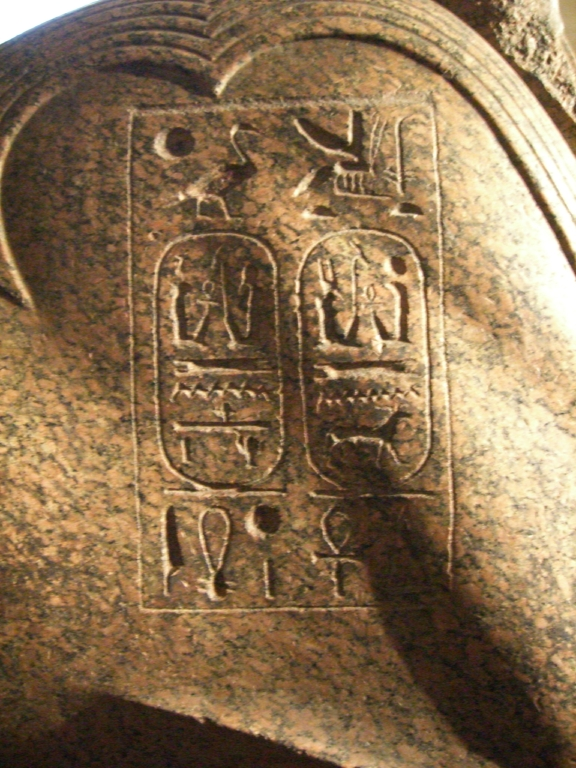
Merneptah's titulary on the Sphinx's right shoulder

The Louvre acquired it in 1826 as part of the second Egyptian collection of Henry Salt, whose purchase was led on behalf of the French state by Jean-François Champollion. Initially, plans were made to place it outdoors, at the center of the Cour Carrée, but they were not implemented. Instead, the sphinx was exhibited in the museum's courtyard, since then known as the cour du Sphinx, from 1828 until 1848, when it was relocated to the galerie Henri IV, which is still the main monumental sculpture room of the museum's Egyptian Department. In the mid-1930s, the Sphinx was transferred to its present location in the crypt created by Louvre architect Albert Ferran to connect the two halves of the southern wing of the Cour Carrée.

== See also ==
- Sphinx of Memphis
- Tanite sphinxes
