= Edmé-Antoine Durand =

French diplomat and art collector

Edmé-Antoine Durand (1768-1835) was a French diplomat and art collector.

== Life ==
The son of a rich businessman, Durand acquired a wide variety of objects, both locally on his travels (especially in central Italy) and also by buying items from existing private collections in France (he acquired several antiquities from Malmaison on the death of Joséphine de Beauharnais, for example).

He auctioned off most of his print collection in 1821 and in 1824 he suggested to Charles X of France that the Louvre Museum buy almost his entire collection of Greek vases and other antiquities, totally several thousand objects and including over 7,000 bronzes. Charles authorized the purchase, which was formalized on 2 March 1825. Durand still owned several hundred vases and a large number of prints on his death - they were auctioned off posthumously in Paris in February 1836 and purchased for the most part by the British Museum on the advice of the Danish antiquary Peter Oluf Brøndsted.
