= Imenmes =

Ancient Egyptian official

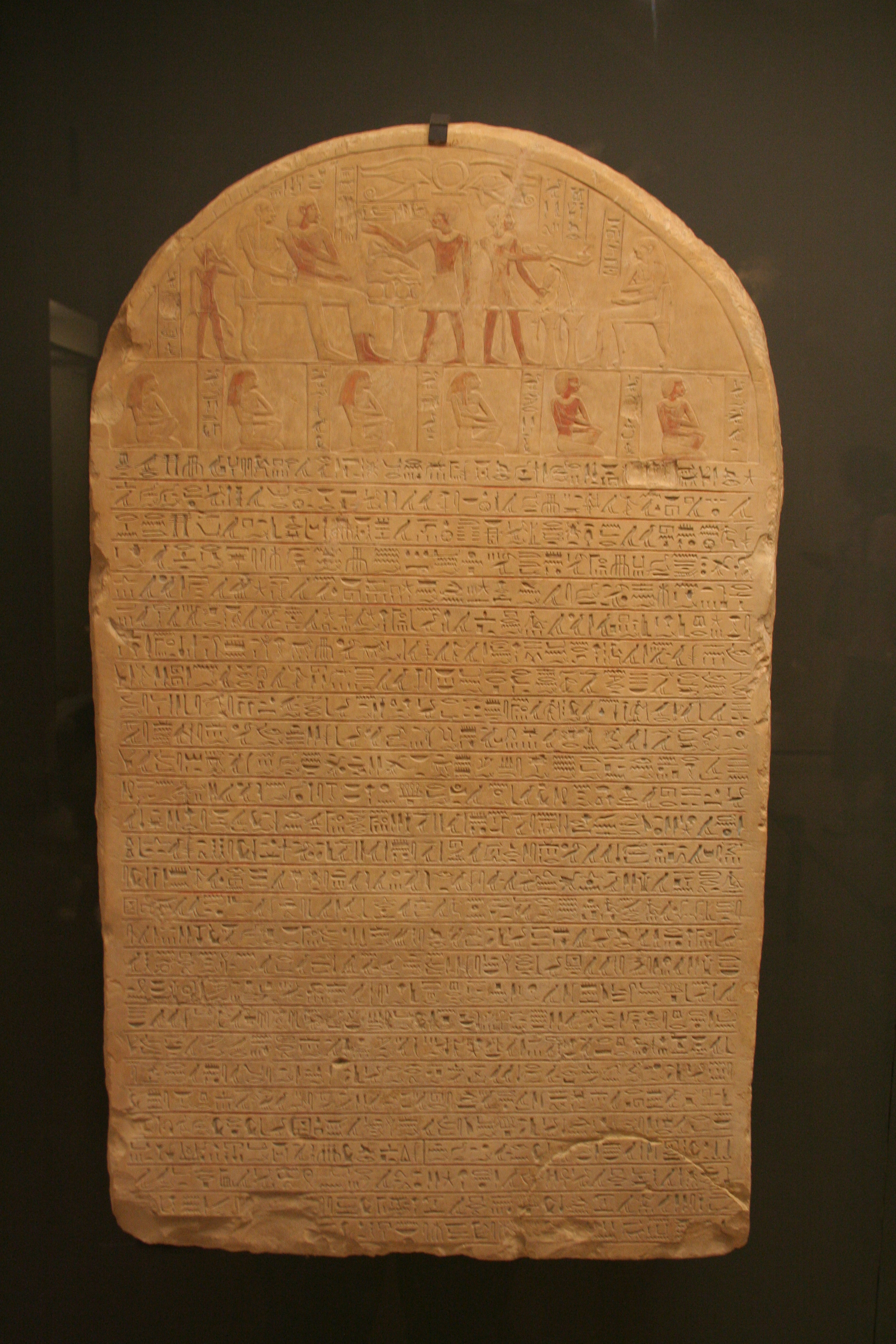
Stele with the hymn of Imenmes, Louvre

Imenmes (fl. c. 1300 BC) was an ancient Egyptian official, who was overseer of the cattle of Amun, probably around the time of the late Eighteenth Dynasty of Egypt. Little is known about him, but several items in the Louvre are related to him, including the Hymn of Imenmes on a stele and a gamebox, known as a senet, which belonged to one of his children. The stele contains a hymn of 28 lines related to the worship of Osiris. In the upper curve of the stele, a double offering scene depicts Imenmes, his wife and one of his sons, and below this, framed in boxes, are the couple's six other children kneeling.
